= 1990 Polish presidential election =

- 25 November 1990 (first round); 9 December 1990 (second round)
- Turnout: 60.63% (first round); 53.40% (second round)
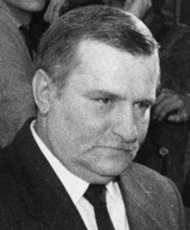

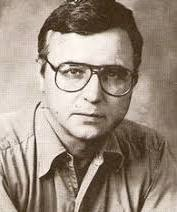
Nominee	Lech Wałęsa	Stanisław Tymiński
Party	KO "S" (PC)	Independent
Popular vote	10,622,696	3,683,098
Percentage	74.25%	25.75%
President before election
Wojciech Jaruzelski
PZPR
Elected President
Lech Wałęsa
KO "S"

Presidential elections were held in Poland on 25 November 1990, with a second round on 9 December. They were the first direct presidential elections in the history of Poland, and the first free presidential elections since the May Coup of 1926. Before World War II, presidents were elected by the Sejm. From 1952 to 1989—the bulk of the Communist era—the presidency did not exist as a separate institution, and most of its functions were fulfilled by the State Council of Poland, whose chairman was considered the equivalent of a president.

There were six candidates who successfully managed to register - Solidarity chairman Lech Wałęsa, Canadian entrepreneur Stanisław Tymiński, Prime Minister Tadeusz Mazowiecki, Members of the Sejm Włodzimierz Cimoszewicz and Roman Bartoszcze, and anti-communist oppositionist Leszek Moczulski. Despite for a long time coming first in opinion polls, Tadeusz Mazowiecki's campaign failed to convince voters to his side, and he did not enter the runoff, coming third in the first round. Stanisław Tymiński came second in a large upset unforeseen by every political force in the country, and, being seen by other candidates as a liar and opportunist, managed to unite both the postcommunist and Solidarity establishments against him. In the second round, Wałęsa won almost 75% of the vote, the largest electoral victory for a free election in Polish political history.

== Background ==
=== Fall of Communism ===
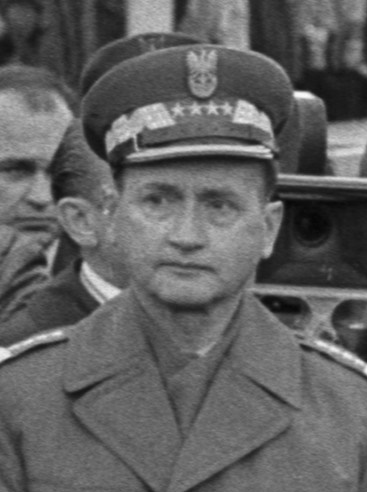
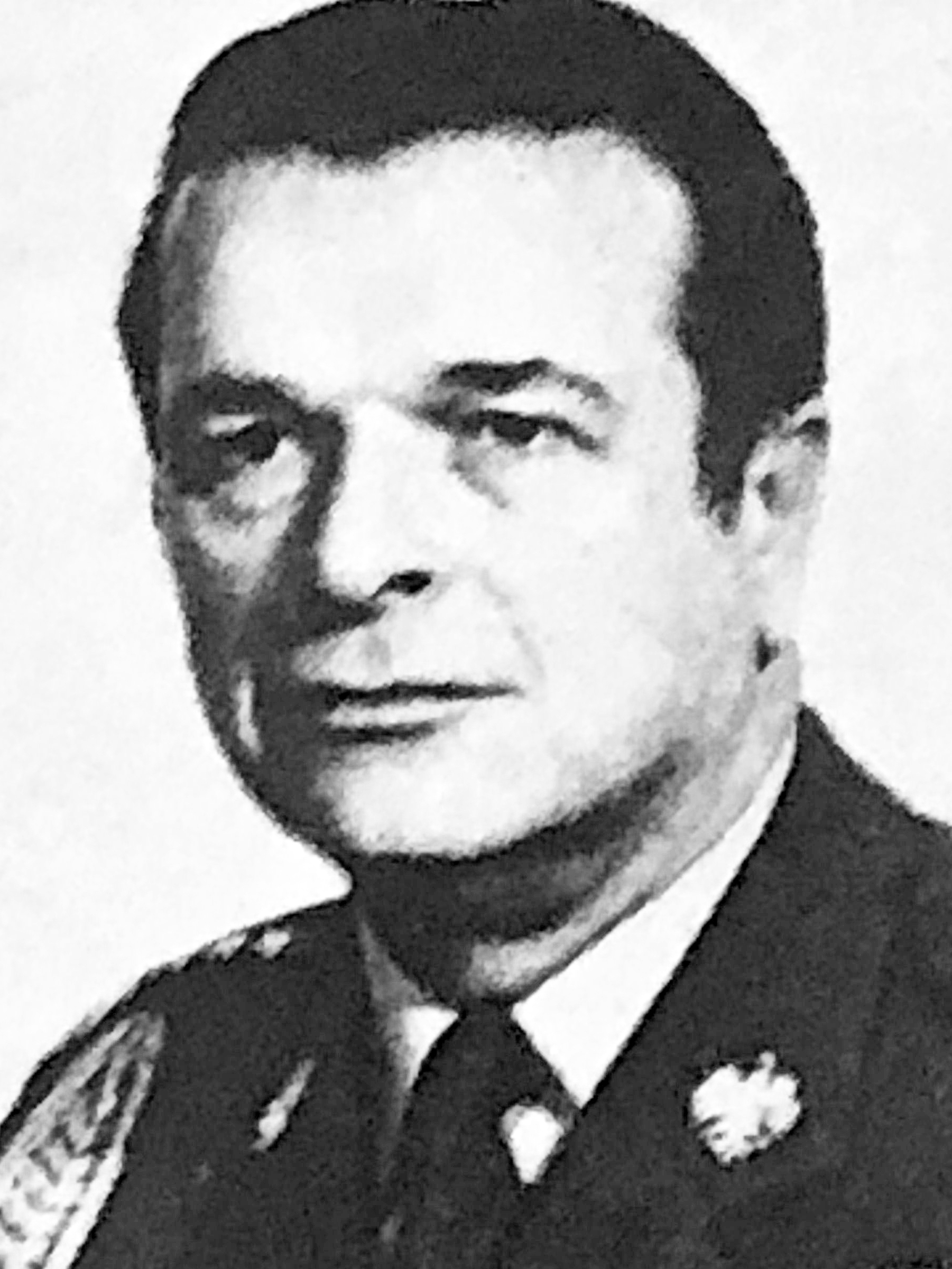
Wojciech Jaruzelski (left) and Czesław Kiszczak (right)

Following the Polish Round Table Agreement, universal parliamentary elections were held in Poland. They were the first free elections since 1928, and began the era of democratic and free market (Note: Balcerowicz Plan) reforms in Poland, as the power of the Polish United Workers' Party (PZPR) began quickly disintegrating - early next year, the party would dissolve, succeeded by the Social Democracy of the Republic of Poland (SdRP), where most of the communist party's wealth was controversially transferred, and the short-lived Polish Social Democratic Union.

The last attempts at salvaging power by the PZPR was the appointment of Czesław Kiszczak as prime minister, who was first assigned the mission of forming a new government with 237 votes (and 173 against), but later, after a defection from ZSL and SD, his proposed government failed to receive the Sejm's confidence. Instead, Solidarity compromised with the communists in a historic compromise, wherein PZPR Chairman Wojciech Jaruzelski would be elected to the newly created position of president, while a Solidarity-aligned candidate - Tadeusz Mazowiecki - would become prime minister.

=== Split within "Solidarity" ===
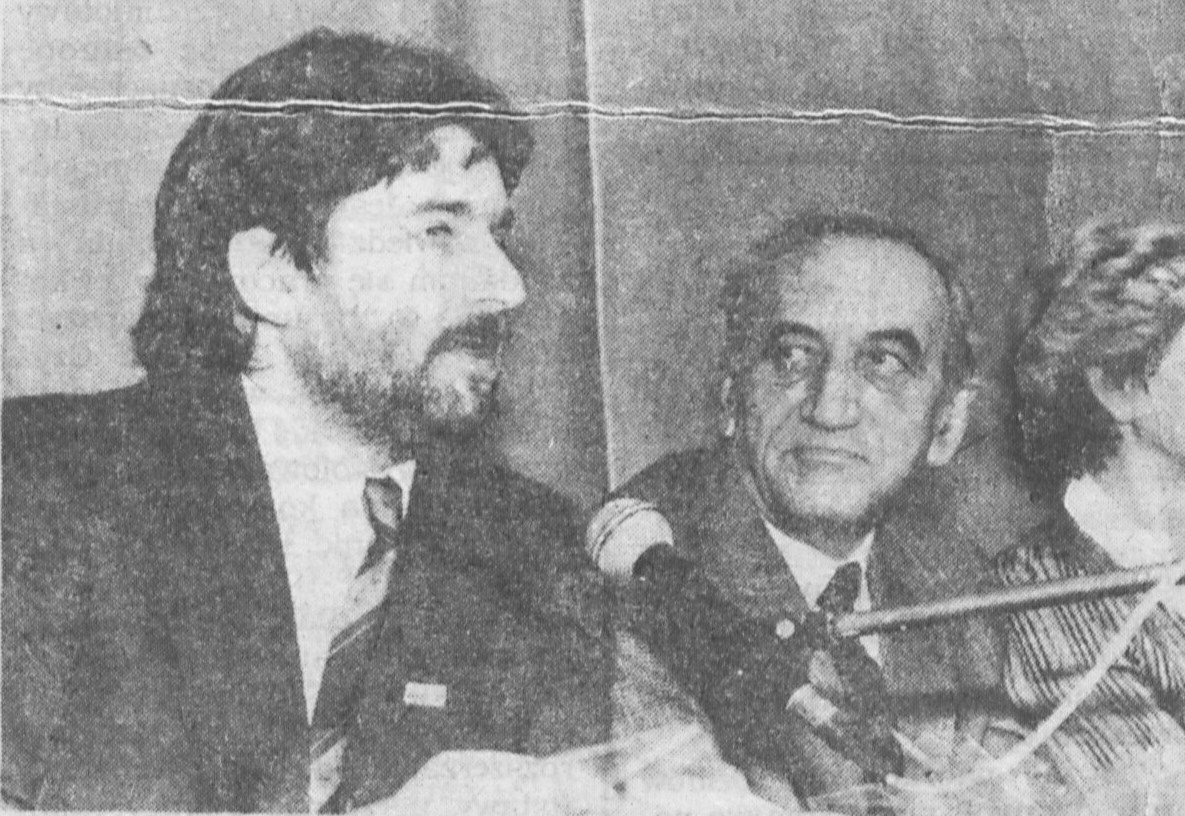
Frasyniuk with Mazowiecki, 1991

The concept of the execution of such compromise was controversial within Solidarity. Liberal and left-leaning members like Bronisław Geremek, Jacek Kuroń, Władysław Frasyniuk or Adam Michnik wanted to create a grand coalition with reformist wing of PZPR. However, the right-leaning faction, led by Lech Wałęsa, and the Kaczyńscy brothers - Lech and Jarosław Kaczyński wanted to instead create coalition with PZPR's satellite parties - the ZSL and SD. The former group formed the Citizens' Movement for Democratic Action faction, and the latter, the Centre Agreement group.

On 7 August, Wałęsa denounced Kiszczak's mission, and declared that the Citizens' Parliamentary Club (OKP), Solidarity's parliamentary club, will be working with ZSL and SD to form a new government. On the 8th and 9th, Geremek and his allies denounced Wałęsa's decision during meetings of Solidarity's leadership and the OKP respectively. However, Wałęsa did not change his decision, and on 24 August, ZSL and SD rejected Kiszczak, instead throwing their support behind Tadeusz Mazowiecki, who formed a Solidarity-ZSL-SD coalition.

In his pursuit of becoming Poland's strongman president during the transition to democracy, Wałesa set several requirements - most importantly that the Prime Minister be younger and less politically experienced than him. Despite meeting both, Mazowiecki quickly turned out to be the polar opposite of what PC desired. Setting aside anti-communism and embracing reformism, he quickly distanced himself from the Centre Agreement and sought to collaborate with ROAD and the Forum of the Democratic Right (FPD).

=== Planning the election ===
On 27 July 1990, the leaders of PC began collecting signatures for a petition aimed at President Jaruzelski, appealing for him to resign and for new indirect presidential elections to be held, with the intention of electing Lech Wałęsa. The petition was opposed by ROAD and FPD, who instead aimed at holding direct presidential elections later in the year. Jaruzelski, knowing the end of his term was near, asked Sejm Marshal Mikołaj Kozakiewicz to call a direct presidential election whenever the concrete date of the election was established.

The Sejm voted to shorten the term of Jaruzelski's Presidency on 21 September. On 27 September, the Parliament passed a constitutional amendment, which defined the criteria for a presidential candidate (and president) and defined the elections by the five-point electoral law (wybory pięcioprzymiotnikowe (Polish)) - the elections must be secret, direct, equal, universal and proportional, and on 2 October, the precise dates of the electoral process were defined, as the election was called by Sejm Marshal Kozakiewicz.

It was required to get 100,000 signatures to run in the election. Only six managed to get past the threshold of signatures - Lech Wałęsa, Tadeusz Mazowiecki, Włodzimierz Cimoszewicz, Roman Bartoszcze, Leszek Moczulski and an unknown Canadian entrepreneur, Stanisław Tymiński.

== Candidate selection ==
=== Solidarity ===
Solidarity Citizens' Committee
Lech Wałęsa	Tadeusz Mazowiecki
Chairman of Solidarity (1980-1991)	Prime Minister of Poland (1989-1991)

Potential candidates
Lech Wałęsa	Tadeusz Mazowiecki	Andrzej Stelmachowski
Chairman of Solidarity (1980-1991)	Prime Minister of Poland (1989-1991)	Marshal of the Senate (1989-1991)

The conflict between Wałęsa and Mazowiecki grew irrenconcilable by late 1990. After several failed attempts at reconciliation and political clashes over positions in the Solidarity movement and trade union, the final attempts at finding a compromise for the presidential election were organized by clergy of the Catholic Church. One was held on 7 July, another on 31 August, where Mazowiecki tried and failed to convince Wałęsa to abandon his presidential ambitions, even promising to field a compromise candidate (presumably Senate Marshal Andrzej Stelmachowski). A last chance at conciliation took place on 18 September, during a meeting with Primate Józef Glemp. Ultimately, the two adversaries from Solidarity ran opposing campaigns - Wałęsa was endorsed by the Centre Agreement, and Mazowiecki by the Citizens' Movement for Democratic Action and Forum of the Democratic Right. The Solidarity movement mostly sided with Wałesa during the election.

=== Social Democracy of the Republic of Poland ===
Social Democracy

Włodzimierz Cimoszewicz
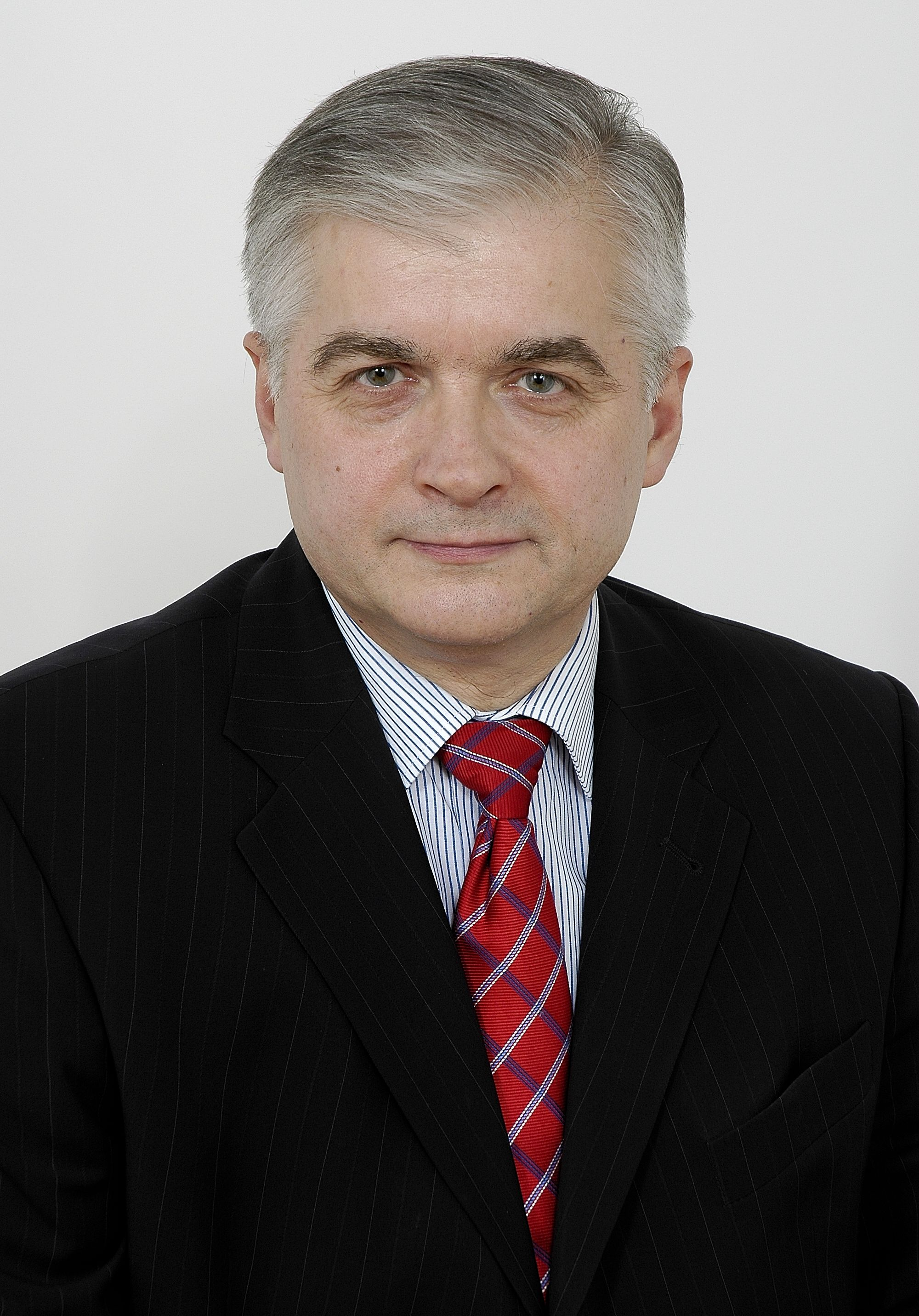
Member of the Sejm
(1989-2005)

Potential candidates
Włodzimierz Cimoszewicz	Ewa Łętowska	Aleksander Kwaśniewski
Member of the Sejm (1989-2005)	Ombudsman in Poland (1988-1992)	Chairman of Social Democracy (1990-1995)

The incumbent president of Poland, Wojciech Jaruzelski, polled to receive 18.5% and 16.6% of the vote if he had run again in May 1989 and May 1990 respectively. Others from the old communist party, like Władysław Baka or Tadeusz Fiszbach were also polled to win 2.7% and 1.9% (Baka), and 1.7% in 1990 (Fiszbach) respectively. However, SdRP sought to modernize its image away from the nomenklatura, and the speculated candidates were reaching the end points of their careers regardless. The General Secretary of SdRP, Leszek Miller, at first endorsed the nonpartisan Ombudsman Ewa Łętowska to be the party's candidate. However, she rejected the offer. As such, Miller endorsed SdRP chairman and future president Aleksander Kwaśniewski, who also rejected, knowing he would lose in a landslide and likely undermine his position in the party by doing so. Kwaśniewski controversially chose to endorse Włodzimierz Cimoszewicz instead, who was the leader of SdRP's parliamentary club. The Supreme Council of the party held a vote which confirmed Cimoszewicz's nomination, and he became the official candidate of the party in the presidential election.

=== Polish People's Party ===
Polish People's Party

Roman Bartoszcze
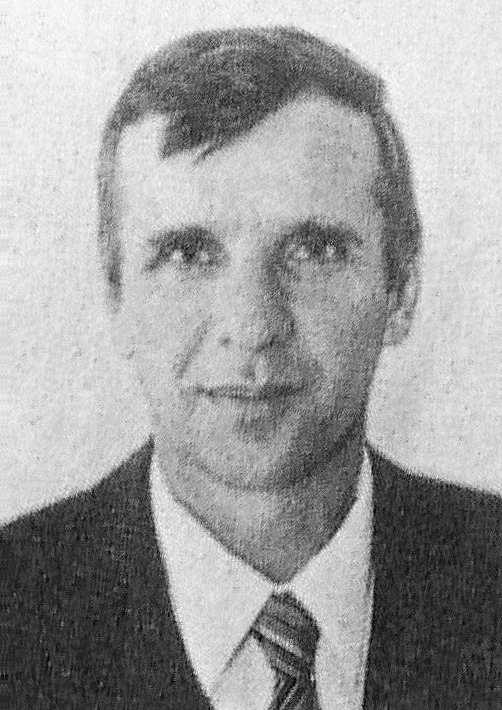
Member of the Sejm
(1989-1993)

Potential candidates
Roman Bartoszcze	Józef Zych
Member of the Sejm (1989-1993)	Member of the Sejm (1989-2015)

On 10 October, the Supreme Executive Committee of PSL declared the candidacy of party chairman Roman Bartoszcze. However, Bartoszcze, as an anti-communist oppositionist, was disliked by the postcommunist ex-ZSL wing of the party. As such, the parliamentary club of PSL, which was seated mostly by members from the ZSL wing, declared ZSL activist Józef Zych's candidacy on 11 October. The next day, the crisis was resolved, as the Supreme Council of PSL confirmed Bartoszcze's candidacy, which believed that voters would be much more likely to support a candidate which did not derive from the communist establishment.

=== Confederation of Independent Poland ===
Confederation of Independent Poland

Leszek Moczulski
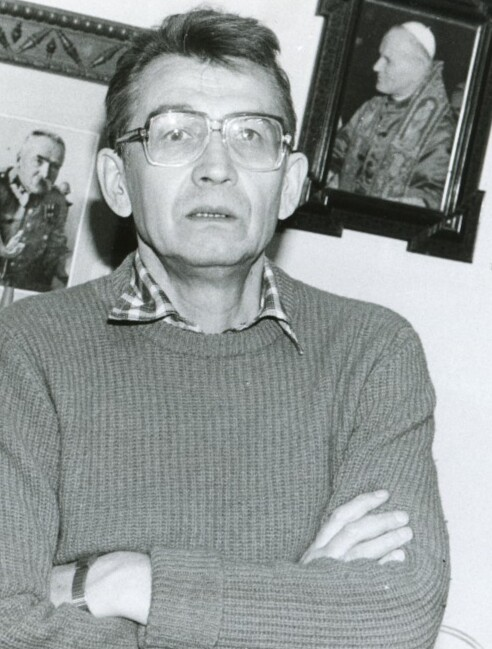
Anti-communist oppositionist

Potential candidates
Leszek Moczulski	Lech Wałęsa
Anti-communist oppositionist	Chairman of Solidarity (1980-1991)

In August 1990, the KPN was split, with ~300 of its ~1500 members seceding, forming the Confederation of Independent Poland – Democratic Faction (Polish: Konfederacja Polski Niepodległej – Frakcja Demokratyczna, KPN-FD), accusing KPN's leader Leszek Moczulski of authoritarian rule over the party. When elections were called, whereas KPN-FD endorsed Wałęsa outright, KPN offered to endorse Wałęsa, on several conditions: for Wałesa to support an instant resignation of President Jaruzelski, immediate withdrawal of the Soviet Army from Poland and condemn the Balcerowicz Plan. Ultimately, with Wałęsa not fitting the conditions, Leszek Moczulski decided to himself run in the election. With 111 thousand out of 100 thousand required signatures, he managed to pass the threshold to run.

=== Independents ===
Independent

Stanisław Tymiński
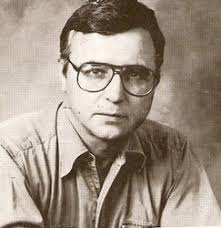
Leader of the Libertarian Party of Canada

Stanisław Tymiński was a Canadian-Peruvian entrepreneur born in Poland who was the sitting leader of the Libertarian Party of Canada. He returned to Poland to contest the presidential elections. He was the only candidate without any political party's backing who managed to cross the threshold of 100,000 signatures needed to contest the elections, in the meanwhile mass-distributing his political manifesto, "Sacred dogs".

=== Rejected candidates ===
The following candidates registered to run, but failed to cross the threshold of 100,000 signatures required to run in the election:

- Jan Bratoszewski (Lawyer from Radom)
- Janusz Bryczkowski (Chairman of the Polish Greens' Party)
- Gabriel Janowski (Senator)
- Janusz Korwin-Mikke (Chairman of the Real Politics Union)
- Edward Mizikowski (Machinist from Warsaw)
- Kornel Morawiecki (Chairman of the Freedom Party)
- Józef Onyszko (Chairman of the Association for the Development of Higher Consciousness "Refugium")
- Władysław Siła-Nowicki (Chairman of the Christian-Democratic Labour Party)
- Bolesław Tejkowski (Chairman of the Polish National Community)
- Waldemar Trajdos (Insurance worker from Łódź)

== Campaign ==
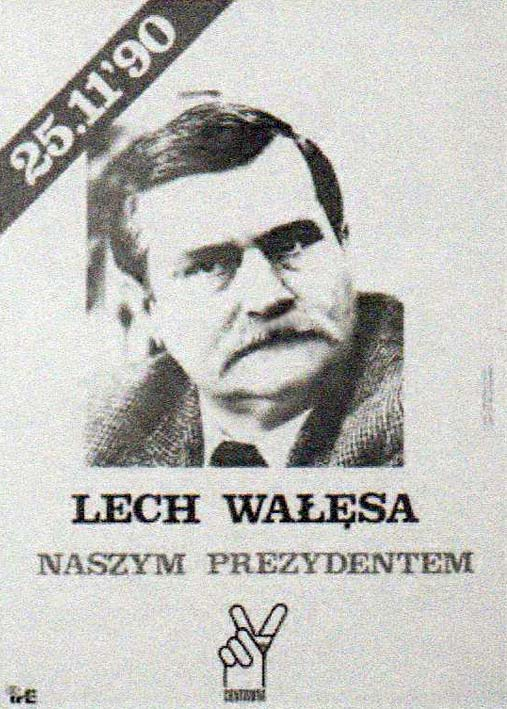
Wałęsa's election poster

=== First round ===
While most voters generally believed the candidates they backed would do best to solve most of the country's issues, there were two major outliers - ~40% of voters believed Bartoszcze would best fix the country's agricultural problems, compared to his 7.15% general vote share, and ~20% of voters believed Moczulski would best deal with the communist nomenklatura and withdrawal from the Eastern bloc, compared to his 2.50% vote share.

Mazowiecki's starting situation was rather unfavorable. Despite holding control over TVP, the Polish national television, his team were inept and at utilizing such a vital campaign organ (which would provide tremendous help to every consecutive presidential candidate which controlled it). It was also indecisive, and the decision of experienced campaign staff was often overriden or contested by proper politicians with a higher authority serving in the team. Though well-respected, the public perceived Mazowiecki as uncharismatic, and his lack of oratory skills, combined with his preoccupation serving as prime minister, led to him massively limiting his public appearances. In light of these obstacles, Mazowiecki tried to deemphasize the importance of his own persona, instead elevating his electoral platform, a strategy that found little appeal outside of intelligentsia circles (which already overwhelmingly supported him). A defining symbol of Mazowiecki's personal isolation was an advertisement his team aired at the beginning of the campaign, presenting him walking around a park, surrounded by bodyguards. In contrast, Wałesa's image was quite overt - Solidarity's chairman held dozens of rallies, meetings and other public events, his persona was charming, characterized as a "plebeian tribune", a "sheriff" bringing communists to justice, promising to directly overlook everything that needed resolution - such a persona enjoyed much public popularity. Tymiński's campaign, that completely faltered at the start, blossomed after TVP began the period of airing campaign ads. His advertisements, which in a simple fashion criticized the government and proposed a "real alternative". The advertisements were so effective that even in an entire voivodeship where Tymiński's campaign had no presence, he had received the largest number of votes of any candidate in the first round. However, that did not mean Tymiński did not campaign in other ways - he held several rallies where he tried to expand his appeal to certain groups.

The Prime Minister's presidential campaign oriented around defending and lauding his accomplishments - notably beginning the economic transformation, signing a treaty with Germany that put an end to fears of Germany pursuing reclamation of its pre-war borders - and convincing undecideds to see the reforms positively. However, his campaign had very little in terms of actual election promises. Meanwhile, Wałesa promised to soften the mass privatization schemes of Finance Minister Leszek Balcerowicz which was largely responsible for perpetually increasing poverty and unemployment and give every Pole a "hundred million (old) złotys" to let citizens better participate in the economic restructuring. Despite his campaign team writing a formal electoral program titled "New beginning", Wałęsa did not stick to it, and later admitted he did not even read it. Wałesa did not, however, promise to solve every problem, unlike Tymiński, whose extreme promises became a major point of success among the increasing crowds of citizens dissatisfied with the new rule of Solidarity.

At later points of the campaign, Mazowiecki's campaign turned rather negative, disorienting his own voterbase and hurting his image, and began airing advertisements showing Wałesa amputating Poland from western Europe with an axe, or with said axe destroying an alarm clock which had previously been repaired by presumably Mazowiecki. Wałęsa's response to such advertisements was to air his own, notably a cartoon in which, wielding the same axe, he destroyed the "thick stroke" (Note: The thick line was a policy of Mazowiecki's Prime Ministry. It was named after a speech he had given: "We split away the history of our recent past with a thick line. We will be responsible only for what we have done to help extract Poland from her current predicament, from now on." The policy was quickly mocked as a way to not hold communists accountable for the supposed crimes they have committed, and the name parodied as the "thick stroke".) and chased away red spiders, signifying communists. Mazowiecki's ally, Gazeta Wyborcza editor-in-chief Adam Michnik, presented Wałesa as a dangerous strongman who would introduce a "catastrophic, Peronist-esque regime". In some circles, Mazowiecki was accused of secretly having Jewish ancestry, a notion which he rejected and condemned. Meanwhile, Wałęsa insinuated Mazowiecki led an inactive, elite government that prided itself in the prestige of governance alone, contrasting it with proposed his model of real societal intervention.

Mazowiecki, with his fatally operated campaign, quickly declined in opinion polls. Despite them showing Mazowiecki continuously declining, Mazowiecki's team was in denial that they had fallen behind Wałęsa (who by November polled 10 points ahead of the Prime Minister). His fall was so severe that he had fallen even behind Tymiński - who was considered such a nonfactor that Mazowiecki's team only took him into account after Tymiński accused him of treason during a rally a mere week before election day.

On 25 November, the first round of voting took place. In an upset victory, Mazowiecki failed to enter the second round, falling five percentage points behind Tymiński. The results were as follows: Wałęsa - 39.96%, Tymiński - 23.10%, Mazowiecki - 18.08%, Cimoszewicz - 9.21%, Bartoszcze - 7.15%, Moczulski - 2.50%. The day after the election, Mazowiecki, humiliated, announced that he would soon be resigning from the office of prime minister, which he did on 12 January next year.

=== Second round ===
After the announcement of the results, Wałęsa received a large array of endorsements from the majority of his former opponents - on 28 November, OKP formally endorsed Wałęsa's candidacy. On November 30, the Catholic Church in Poland, which did not directly endorse any candidate beforehand, finally chose to endorse Wałęsa. On 1 and 2 December, ROAD and then Mazowiecki begrudgingly endorsed him as well. PSL and KPN also endorsed him - only Cimoszewicz, who represented the postcommunist camp, did not support either candidate.

Tymiński attempted to extend his appeal towards Mazowiecki's and Cimoszewicz's liberal and leftist voters. His attempts at broadening his voterbase, like opposing anti-abortion laws, or praising President Jaruzelski and the period of martial law, contradicted his previous statements about his deep belief in Catholic social teaching, and targeted the intelligentsia environment which were not receptive to his overall populist image in general. Tymiński's momentum, which rose extremely quickly, also seemed to reach its peak at the beginning of the second round.

On 1 December, a pseudo-debate, which took form of a joint press conference where the candidates were free to talk with each other, took place. Tymiński appeared with a black briefcase, claiming it contained incriminating evidence against Wałesa, who replied by ordering Tymiński to show the evidence, assuming Tymiński was bluffing. Tymiński, who did not open the briefcase, proved the clear loser of the debate. A legitimate debate planned for the next day was cancelled when Tymiński refused to take part, his image being damaged enough in the previous debate.

TVP released material in a smear campaign against Tymiński on 4 December, pinning several allegations against him, among which, that he abused his wife and children. Several years after the campaign, Tymiński won a lawsuit against TVP for defamation, but at that point the election had already been long over.

On 9 December, the second round of the presidential election took place, in which Wałesa won in a landslide victory of 74.25%, compared to Tymiński's 25.75%, which was the largest landslide in the history of Polish elections.

=== Campaign spending ===
Candidate	1990		2024	
Candidate	Spent	Cost	Spent	Cost
Wałęsa	5,551,556,205	845	88,303,405	13
Tymiński	3,332,461,000	877	53,006,336	14
Mazowiecki	5,667,041,184	1906	90,140,316	30
Cimoszewicz	1,827,428,175	1207	29,067,188	19
Bartoszcze	436,412,950	394	6,941,612	6
Moczulski	369,129,852	897	5,871,402	14

=== Second round candidate endorsements ===
Candidate	First round	Endorsement
Tadeusz Mazowiecki	18.08%	Lech Wałęsa
Włodzimierz Cimoszewicz	9.21%	No endorsement
Roman Bartoszcze	7.15%	Lech Wałęsa
Leszek Moczulski	2.50%	Lech Wałęsa

== Opinion polls ==
=== First round ===
Graphical summary of opinion polls: Lech Wałęsa Stanisław Tymiński Tadeusz Mazowiecki W. Cimoszewicz Roman Bartoszcze Leszek Moczulski

Polling firm/Link	Fieldwork date	Sample size	Wałęsa "S" (PC)	Tymiński Ind.	Mazowiecki "S" (ROAD/FPD)	Cimoszewicz SdRP	Bartoszcze PSL	Moczulski KPN	Others	Don't know	Lead
1990 presidential election	Election result	16,442,474	39.96	23.10	18.08	9.21	7.15	2.50			16.86
CBOS	22–23 Nov 1990	1,493	33	18	27	10	9	3			6
OBOP	19–20 Nov 1990	1,000	38	17	23	6	5	2		9	15
CBOS	17–18 Nov 1990	1,490	27	20	17	5	6	1		24	7
OBOP	12–13 Nov 1990	1,000	35	17	19	5	7	2		15	16
CBOS	10–11 Nov 1990	1,000	30.5	12.6	20.6	5.8	7.6	1.9		21	9.9
OBOP	5–6 Nov 1990	1,000	41	8	23	7	4	2		15	18
OBOP	29–30 Oct 1990	1,000	33	2	26	4	6	2		27	7
OBOP	22–23 Oct 1990	1,000	33		28	2	3	1	4 (Note: Others – 2, Janusz Korwin-Mikke – 1, Kornel Morawiecki – 1)	29	5
CBOS	17–23 Oct 1990		33.2		41.8				8.5	11.8	8.6
OBOP	15–16 Oct 1990		24		29				5	42	5
CBOS	11–16 Oct 1990		27.3		39.8				13.6	14.1	12.5
Demoskop / Rz	5–6 Oct 1990		37		32				19.5	12	5
CBOS	10–17 Sep 1990	1,484	17.8		15.8				47.9 (Note: Others – 10.4, None of the above – 13.3, Krzysztof Skubiszewski – 8.9, Bronisław Geremek – 8.5, Wojciech Jaruzelski – 6.8)	18.5	2.0
CBOS	10–17 Jun 1990	1,490	15.6		18.0				47.0 (Note: Others – 15.4, None of the above – 10.5, Wojciech Jaruzelski – 11.9, Bronisław Geremek – 9.2)	19.4	2.4
OBOP	May 1990		18		24			3	22 (Note: Others – 14, Zbigniew Brzeziński – 8)	33	6
CBOS	20–24 Apr 1990	1,387	16.1		23.9				43.5 (Note: Bronisław Geremek – 18.7, Wojciech Jaruzelski – 16.6, Zbigniew Brzeziński – 4.6, Władysław Baka – 1.9, Tadeusz Fiszbach – 1.7)		5.2
CBOS	May 1989		18.7		2.3				33.5 (Note: Wojciech Jaruzelski – 18.5, Bronisław Geremek – 7.7, Zbigniew Brzeziński – 4.6, Władysław Baka – 2.7)		0.2

=== Second round ===
Polling firm/Link	Fieldwork date	Sample size	Wałęsa "S" (PC)	Tymiński Ind.	Don't know	Lead
1990 presidential election	Election result	14,305,794	74.25	25.75		48.50
OBOP	3–4 Dec	1,000	73	18	11	55
Demoskop	4 Dec	1,000	61	20		41
CBOS	1–3 Dec	1,500	58	23		35
OBOP	26–27 Nov	1,000	58	30	12	28

A second-round poll by "Biuro Badan Społecznych 'Wika'" for "Fundacja Radia 'Solidarność'" among 500 respondents showed that 68% would vote for Wałęsa, and 14% for Tymiński in the city of Warsaw.

== Results ==
Candidate	Party	First round		Second round	
Candidate	Party	Votes	%	Votes	%
Lech Wałęsa	Solidarity (PC faction)	6,569,889	39.96	10,622,696	74.25
Stanisław Tymiński	Independent	3,797,605	23.10	3,683,098	25.75
Tadeusz Mazowiecki	Solidarity (ROAD and FPD factions)	2,973,264	18.08		
Włodzimierz Cimoszewicz	Social Democracy of the Republic of Poland	1,514,025	9.21		
Roman Bartoszcze	Polish People's Party	1,176,175	7.15		
Leszek Moczulski	Confederation of Independent Poland	411,516	2.50		
Total		16,442,474	100.00	14,305,794	100.00
Valid votes		16,442,474	98.45	14,305,794	97.65
Invalid/blank votes		259,526	1.55	344,243	2.35
Total votes		16,702,000	100.00	14,650,037	100.00
Registered voters/turnout		27,545,625	60.63	27,436,078	53.40
Source: PKW

Vote share
Second round
Wałęsa	74.25%
Tymiński	25.75%
First round
Wałęsa	39.96%
Tymiński	23.10%
Mazowiecki	18.08%
Cimoszewicz	9.21%
Bartoszcze	7.15%
Moczulski	2.50%

=== Results by voivodeship ===
==== First round ====
	Lech Wałęsa		Stanisław Tymiński		Tadeusz Mazowiecki		Włodzimierz Cimoszewicz		Roman Bartoszcze		Leszek Moczulski		Turnout	
Voivodeship	#	%	#	%	#	%	#	%	#	%	#	%	#	%
Bialskopodlaskie	52 282	41.47%	26 063	20.69%	8509	6.75%	12 694	10.08%	23 410	18.58%	3034	2.41%	128 597	59.64%
Białostockie	127 538	42.50%	36 046	12.01%	38 948	12.98%	81 581	27.18%	11 703	3.90%	4302	1.43%	304 822	60.95%
Bielskie	185 832	45.08%	88 756	21.53%	81 447	19.76%	28 116	6.82%	16 156	3.92%	11 904	2.89%	418 863	66.44%
Bydgoskie	156 971	31.13%	139 964	27.75%	93 102	18.46%	65 339	12.96%	35 587	7.06%	13 333	2.64%	511 426	64.91%
Chełmskie	39 427	39.66%	21 137	21.26%	7316	7.36%	12 753	12.83%	15 822	15.92%	2960	2.98%	101 423	58.00%
Ciechanowskie	62 022	36.19%	55 698	32.50%	11 657	6.80%	17 549	10.24%	21 655	12.63%	2809	1.64%	174 872	57.67%
Częstochowskie	129 514	37.23%	111 135	31.95%	48 631	13.98%	25 045	7.20%	22 514	6.47%	11 035	3.17%	353 503	62.57%
Elbląskie	61 021	31.66%	60 315	31.29%	32 995	17.12%	19 632	10.19%	14 317	7.43%	4471	2.32%	195 531	59.52%
Gdańskie	336 893	52.28%	92 965	14.43%	142 382	22.09%	38 454	5.97%	19 031	2.95%	14 721	2.28%	652 487	63.23%
Gorzowskie	60 605	29.79%	54 423	26.75%	46 027	22.63%	24 394	11.99%	13 294	6.54%	4671	2.30%	206 749	59.86%
Jeleniogórskie	75 148	34.17%	60 760	27.63%	47 264	21.49%	21 851	9.94%	8907	4.05%	5695	2.59%	223 073	60.44%
Kaliskie	101 245	31.43%	87 936	27.30%	54 180	16.82%	36 296	11.27%	35 514	11.03%	6929	2.15%	328 596	65.56%
Katowickie	505 891	30.99%	507 737	31.10%	398 627	24.42%	126 869	7.77%	31 294	1.92%	62 144	3.81%	1 653 252	57.35%
Kieleckie	159 472	34.40%	121 537	26.22%	50 855	10.97%	51 542	11.12%	68 231	14.72%	11 889	2.56%	471 818	57.72%
Konińskie	72 753	37.60%	53 835	27.82%	17 980	9.29%	19 606	10.13%	25 389	13.12%	3928	2.03%	197 597	60.33%
Koszalińskie	65 093	31.04%	60 344	28.78%	42 259	20.15%	22 809	10.88%	14 244	6.79%	4935	2.35%	212 909	59.08%
Krakowskie	279 192	51.16%	55 028	10.08%	138 548	25.39%	29 129	5.34%	27 204	4.99%	16 588	3.04%	553 360	60.34%
Krośnieńskie	107 217	50.84%	45 066	21.37%	20 843	9.88%	13 395	6.35%	18 792	8.91%	5581	2.65%	215 345	63.59%
Legnickie	69 695	33.03%	68 280	32.36%	39 269	18.61%	17 407	8.25%	11 241	5.33%	5093	2.41%	213 672	61.11%
Leszczyńskie	43 702	24.76%	50 560	28.65%	35 652	20.20%	20 999	11.90%	21 951	12.44%	3607	2.04%	180 145	67.79%
Lubelskie	197 696	46.65%	74 559	17.60%	49 087	11.58%	39 274	9.27%	50 392	11.89%	12 742	3.01%	430 191	58.47%
Łomżyńskie	71 263	50.64%	35 792	25.43%	9367	6.66%	9 410	6.69%	12 294	8.74%	2597	1.85%	143 511	59.29%
Łódzkie	233 992	43.57%	112 805	21.00%	105 606	19.66%	59 878	11.15%	11 045	2.05%	13 745	2.60%	543 442	58.76%
Nowosądeckie	181 783	62.29%	32 919	11.28%	36 989	12.68%	12 448	4.27%	20 791	7.12%	6880	2.36%	299 202	63.39%
Olsztyńskie	92 944	30.63%	102 684	33.84%	45 279	14.92%	34 570	11.39%	20 966	6.91%	6930	2.28%	307 981	59.94%
Opolskie	140 073	37.53%	79 064	21.19%	89 437	23.97%	30 618	8.20%	23 432	6.28%	10 560	2.83%	381 093	53.28%
Ostrołęckie	70 353	44.70%	48 092	30.56%	9 743	6.19%	11 790	7.49%	14 955	9.50%	2456	1.56%	160 727	58.48%
Pilskie	53 725	25.24%	56 799	26.69%	47 236	22.19%	27 662	13.00%	22 004	10.34%	5416	2.54%	217 158	66.16%
Piotrkowskie	115 914	43.47%	66 287	24.86%	24 931	9.35%	24 038	9.01%	29 057	10.90%	6431	2.41%	271 662	59.04%
Płockie	76 614	35.55%	72 649	33.71%	20 244	9.39%	20 170	9.36%	21 839	10.13%	4005	1.86%	219 346	59.25%
Poznańskie	197 630	32.21%	129 252	21.06%	181 136	29.52%	60 490	9.86%	31 902	5.20%	13 181	2.15%	662 620	68.59%
Przemyskie	81 624	48.17%	28 372	16.74%	17 667	10.43%	10 992	6.49%	26 999	15.93%	3791	2.24%	173 296	61.24%
Radomskie	152 944	50.54%	54 236	17.92%	23 905	7.90%	27 348	9.04%	37 999	12.56%	6180	2.04%	308 171	58.35%
Rzeszowskie	173 174	54.89%	57 114	18.10%	31 823	10.09%	18 144	5.75%	27 056	8.58%	8162	2.59%	321 604	65.43%
Siedleckie	121 738	46.05%	67 360	25.48%	14 581	5.52%	17 616	6.66%	39 005	14.76%	4048	1.53%	269 980	59.09%
Sieradzkie	59 523	33.87%	51 317	29.20%	16 144	9.18%	17 923	10.20%	27 278	15.52%	3580	2.04%	178 951	60.82%
Skierniewickie	69 464	41.03%	47 148	27.85%	15 226	8.99%	13 659	8.07%	20 390	12.05%	3392	2.00%	172 273	56.54%
Słupskie	49 230	30.36%	47 055	29.02%	31 426	19.38%	18 063	11.14%	12 465	7.69%	3919	2.42%	164 513	58.37%
Suwalskie	65 759	37.50%	50 918	29.04%	19 165	10.93%	19 738	11.26%	15 418	8.79%	4345	2.48%	178 247	55.52%
Szczecińskie	116 800	28.16%	105 900	25.53%	117 949	28.43%	40 950	9.87%	17 528	4.23%	15 689	3.78%	420 358	59.66%
Tarnobrzeskie	108 572	44.81%	60 424	24.94%	16 819	6.94%	18 329	7.56%	32 523	13.42%	5652	2.33%	247 946	59.54%
Tarnowskie	149 958	53.09%	35 320	12.50%	40 379	14.29%	13 095	4.64%	36 323	12.86%	7395	2.62%	289 500	63.47%
Toruńskie	82 818	29.34%	76 516	27.11%	54 443	19.29%	29 038	10.29%	22 971	8.14%	6488	2.30%	286 002	60.56%
Wałbrzyskie	107 837	33.95%	95 839	30.17%	61 449	19.34%	31 413	9.89%	13 212	4.16%	7920	2.49%	321 802	59.76%
Warszawskie	651 947	50.67%	162 761	12.65%	321 571	24.99%	108 593	8.44%	21 148	1.64%	20 632	1.60%	1 296 644	64.28%
Włocławskie	59 274	33.87%	43 810	25.03%	18 621	10.64%	24 967	14.27%	24 310	13.89%	4037	2.31%	178 032	57.33%
Wrocławskie	209 984	42.14%	101 738	20.42%	118 987	23.88%	36 444	7.31%	20 835	4.18%	10 314	2.07%	503 886	60.28%
Zamojskie	94 896	45.52%	32 198	15.44%	10 568	5.07%	16 669	8.00%	49 483	23.74%	4659	2.23%	212 700	60.23%
Zielonogórskie	80 527	29.08%	71 092	25.68%	66 995	24.20%	35 236	12.73%	16 299	5.89%	6741	2.43%	281 575	61.03%
Poland	6 569 889	39.96%	3 797 605	23.10%	2 973 364	18.08%	1 514 025	9.21%	1 176 175	7.15%	411 516	2.50%	16 702 000	60.63%

==== Second round ====
Voivodeship	Lech Wałęsa		Stanisław Tymiński		Turnout		
Voivodeship	#	%	#	%	#	%	
Voivodeship	Bialskopodlaskie	80 104	69.30%	35 482	30.70%	118 082	54.78%
Białostockie	188 571	70.15%	80 227	29.85%	274 946	54.92%	
Bielskie	305 052	82.83%	63 246	17.17%	377 061	59.79%	
Bydgoskie	275 401	64.79%	149 691	35.21%	437 758	55.50%	
Chełmskie	56 915	64.36%	31 514	35.64%	90 761	51.84%	
Ciechanowskie	90 872	58.90%	63 413	41.10%	158 171	59.64%	
Częstochowskie	204 654	69.62%	89 308	30.38%	300 790	53.13%	
Elbląskie	102 564	64.24%	57 094	35.76%	163 919	49.82%	
Gdańskie	516 061	87.38%	74 502	12.62%	603 571	58.64%	
Gorzowskie	103 823	62.67%	61 854	37.33%	170 389	49.26%	
Jeleniogórskie	129 956	71.31%	52 294	28.69%	186 722	50.50%	
Kaliskie	181 833	65.68%	95 014	34.32%	286 182	57.01%	
Katowickie	956 837	72.29%	366 854	27.71%	1 354 201	46.84%	
Kieleckie	262 315	64.33%	145 431	35.67%	417.763	51.11%	
Konińskie	104 773	61.43%	65 796	38.57%	175 502	53.40%	
Koszalińskie	108 560	62.51%	65 107	37.49%	178 432	49.43%	
Krakowskie	476 313	90.20%	51 776	9.80%	536 484	58.47%	
Krośnieńskie	160 548	80.61%	38 621	19.39%	203 382	60.04%	
Legnickie	121 855	69.37%	53 804	30.63%	179 582	51.07%	
Leszczyńskie	89 871	61.17%	57 046	38.83%	153 033	57.56%	
Lubelskie	295 261	76.74%	89 482	23.26%	392 638	53.25%	
Łomżyńskie	99 297	75.23%	32 700	24.77%	135 115	55.77%	
Łódzkie	355 954	79.27%	93 066	20.73%	459 352	49.54%	
Nowosądeckie	275 564	90.87%	27 690	9.13%	309 255	65.24%	
Olsztyńskie	149 930	59.02%	104 013	40.98%	260 642	50.71%	
Opolskie	256 800	79.11%	67 827	20.89%	332 975	46.47%	
Ostrołęckie	101 552	69.84%	43 858	30.16%	149 211	54.22%	
Pilskie	107 838	61.50%	67 680	37.50%	182 875	55.67%	
Piotrkowskie	169 357	72.27%	64 969	27.73%	240 005	52.12%	
Płockie	112 838	59.10%	78 014	40.90%	195 468	52.74%	
Poznańskie	382 219	74.63%	129 938	25.37%	528 198	54.59%	
Przemyskie	130 479	79.68%	33 267	20.32%	167 204	59.15%	
Radomskie	220 865	77.94%	62 504	22.06%	289 628	54.76%	
Rzeszowskie	258 060	85.72%	42 988	14.28%	307 736	62.54%	
Siedleckie	177 957	72.88%	66 208	27.12%	250 088	54.68%	
Sieradzkie	91 549	60.30%	60 266	39.70%	156 131	53.07%	
Skierniewickie	102 184	69.28%	45 316	30.72%	150 903	49.52%	
Słupskie	84 707	63.07%	49 595	36.93%	138 066	48.83%	
Suwalskie	99 102	63.15%	57 820	36.85%	160 537	49.91%	
Szczecińskie	219 562	66.68%	109 729	33.32%	337 521	59.64%	
Tarnobrzeskie	157 460	70.24%	66 721	29.76%	229 101	55.15%	
Tarnowskie	248 366	89.13%	30 277	10.87%	284 546	62.24%	
Toruńskie	160 867	67.84%	76 269	32.16%	243 055	51.28%	
Wałbrzyskie	187 643	70.53%	78 410	29.47%	271 734	50.39%	
Warszawskie	913 625	86.87%	138 106	13.13%	1 072 542	57.02%	
Włocławskie	92 783	59.33%	63 609	40.67%	160 203	51.42%	
Wrocławskie	364 119	82.72%	76 142	17.28%	448 912	53.63%	
Zamojskie	143 161	72.95%	53 090	27.05%	200 474	56.76%	
Zielonogórskie	146 919	66.06%	75 470	33.94%	229 191	49.65%	
Poland	10 622 696	74.25%	3 683 098	25.75%	14 650 037	53.40%	

=== Notional results by modern voivodeship ===
The following notional results have been calculated by amalgamating the gmina-level results according to their inclusion in the Voivodeships of Poland created in the 1999 Polish administrative reform.

==== First round ====
Map of the notional results for the first round, by modern-day Voivodeship.

	Lech Wałęsa		Stanisław Tymiński		Tadeusz Mazowiecki		Włodzimierz Cimoszewicz		Roman Bartoszcze		Leszek Moczulski		Turnout	
Voivodeship	#	%	#	%	#	%	#	%	#	%	#	%	#	%
Lower Silesian	452 169	36.83%	324 358	26.42%	259 881	21.17%	106 059	8.64%	56 856	4.63%	28 401	2.31%	1 243 375	60.32%
Kuyavian-Pomeranian	287 450	31.98%	241 932	26.92%	155 677	17.32%	113 973	12.68%	77 606	8.64%	22 069	2.46%	911 329	61.78%
Lublin	409 809	44.59%	168 208	18.30%	77 999	8.49%	85 563	9.31%	152 877	16.63%	24 589	2.68%	935 794	58.76%
Lubusz	124 253	30.21%	103 617	25.19%	98 246	23.89%	51 650	12.56%	23 680	5.76%	9 835	2.39%	417 867	60.45%
Łódź	490 593	40.86%	296 894	24.73%	163 663	13.63%	120 851	10.07%	100 366	8.36%	28 296	2.36%	1 219 497	59.13%
Lesser Poland	694 201	51.29%	190 174	14.05%	255 780	18.90%	73 450	5.43%	100 114	7.40%	39 795	2.94%	1 379 631	62.38%
Masovian	1 070 230	48.28%	422 107	19.04%	358 078	16.15%	190 647	8.60%	139 504	6.29%	36 084	1.63%	2 246 781	60.76%
Opole	148 259	37.02%	88 171	22.02%	93 937	23.46%	32 523	8.12%	26 288	6.56%	11 293	2.82%	408 952	53.23%
Subcarpathian	471 094	51.33%	181 715	19.80%	97 540	10.63%	56 708	6.18%	87 755	9.56%	22 986	2.50%	936 318	63.71%
Podlaskie	232 716	44.40%	93 199	17.78%	57 396	10.95%	100 116	19.10%	31 862	6.08%	8 891	1.70%	532 931	59.49%
Pomeranian	421 865	45.98%	173 191	18.88%	193 212	21.06%	67 289	7.33%	40 365	4.40%	21 627	2.36%	929 522	62.14%
Silesian	700 182	33.60%	621 955	29.85%	479 768	23.03%	157 658	7.57%	49 753	2.39%	74 305	3.57%	2 110 856	58.87%
Świętokrzyskie	186 972	34.87%	141 369	26.36%	54 637	10.19%	59 355	11.07%	80 427	15.00%	13 455	2.51%	546 265	57.31%
Warmian-Masurian	170 742	31.51%	180 609	33.33%	77 931	14.38%	60 583	11.18%	39 488	7.29%	12 591	2.32%	550 667	59.60%
Greater Poland	453 739	30.79%	368 979	25.04%	330 964	22.46%	159 467	10.82%	128 698	8.73%	31 830	2.16%	1 500 420	65.00%
West Pomeranian	201 361	28.83%	188 245	26.95%	174 333	24.96%	73 593	10.53%	38 540	5.52%	22 490	3.22%	708 532	59.08%
Poland	6 569 889	39.96%	3 797 605	23.10%	2 973 364	18.08%	1 514 025	9.21%	1 176 175	7.15%	411 516	2.50%	16 702 000	60.63%

==== Second round ====
Map of the notional results for the second round, by modern-day Voivodeship.

	Lech Wałęsa		Stanisław Tymiński		Turnout	
Voivodeship	#	%	#	%	#	%
Lower Silesian	786 674	75.04%	261 623	24.96%	1 070 833	51.88%
Kuyavian-Pomeranian	490 599	64.34%	271 949	35.66%	783 252	52.97%
Lublin	615 597	72.91%	228 751	27.09%	862 760	54.12%
Lubusz	218 610	65.81%	113 576	34.19%	341 517	49.36%
Łódź	737 210	71.67%	291 339	28.33%	1 053 680	51.02%
Lesser Poland	1 145 270	87.36%	165 637	12.64%	1 336 177	60.32%
Masovian	1 591 180	79.27%	416 102	20.73%	2 050 655	55.37%
Opole	271 901	78.23%	75 657	21.77%	356 546	46.33%
Subcarpathian	713 210	82.17%	154 721	17.83%	886 711	60.24%
Podlaskie	338 652	71.03%	138 149	28.97%	487 765	54.39%
Pomeranian	666 790	81.18%	154 538	18.82%	840 887	56.14%
Silesian	1 262 846	73.68%	451 115	26.32%	1 753 441	48.78%
Świętokrzyskie	301 290	63.48%	173 330	36.52%	486 210	51.02%
Warmian-Masurian	274 595	59.91%	183 774	40.09%	470 483	50.86%
Greater Poland	842 150	67.74%	401 031	32.26%	1 286 221	55.63%
West Pomeranian	366 122	64.47%	201 806	35.53%	582 899	48.49%
Poland	10 622 696	74.25%	3 683 098	25.75%	14 650 037	53.40%

== Aftermath ==
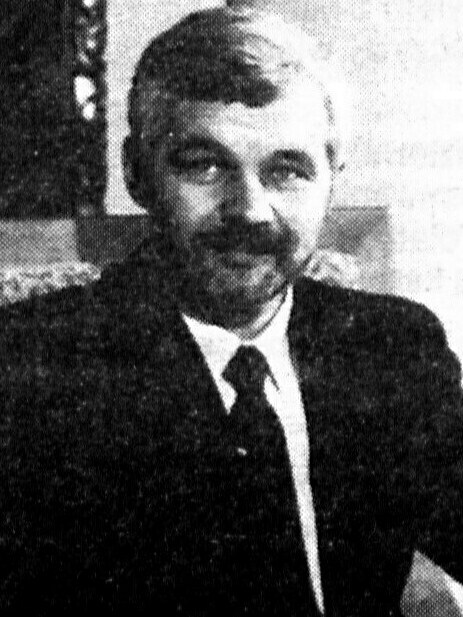
Bielecki in 1991

Prime Minister Mazowiecki, utterly humiliated, resigned from his office soon after the election. His successor, Jan Krzysztof Bielecki, was another liberal, who was again selected by the criteria Wałęsa set out for any possible prime ministers - to be younger and less experienced politically. Bielecki, though not significantly changing the course of the country, was more subservient to the now-president and his vision.

ROAD and FPD were devastated by Mazowiecki's loss. In May 1991, they united into the Democratic Union (UD) (with a small social-democratic splinter forming the Democratic-Social Movement). UD contested the 1991 parliamentary election, becoming the biggest party in the Sejm with 62 seats until a splinter led by former FPD members.

President-elect Wałęsa resigned from his role as Chairman of the Solidarity trade union shortly after becoming president, endorsing Lech Kaczyński to become the new chairman of the trade union. He faced the liberal-aligned Bogdan Borusewicz and relatively nonpartisan Marian Krzaklewski. On the 3rd Congress of Solidarity on 22–25 February, despite Wałesa's endorsement, Kaczyński lost the vote for union leadership to Krzaklewski, who would become an important politician for the duration of the next decade.

Starting in January 1991, Roman Bartoszcze's position within PSL began dissipating. His period as chairman concluded when after controversially signing a cooperation agreement with Rural Solidarity and PSL "Solidarity", party leadership decided to oust him and replace him with Waldemar Pawlak, who would become a future prime minister. Bartoszcze's ousting led to him creating a new party, the Polish People's Christian Forum "Fatherland", which had significantly less success than PSL and never won any seats in any election.

Leszek Moczulski, who used the presidential election to spread his agenda and promulgate his party, succeeded in his goals, as KPN won 7.5% of the vote in the following 1991 parliamentary election, three times as much as he had personally amassed in the presidential election. However, the low result itself was a point of disappointment for Moczulski and his party.

Tymiński became largely irrelevant following the election, sometimes appearing in elections as a perennial candidate. He founded a political party, which was vehemently opposed by a large sector of society - 38% supported its delegalization. In 1991, its candidates were disqualified in 90% of districts, and would only secure 52,735 votes, winning 3 seats. The party would not win any seats in any following elections. After running for president again in 2005, he only won 23,545 votes. He contested another election in 2023, running for Senate, winning only 18,052 votes. Though his political career was barely relevant following the first direct presidential election in Poland, his name became famous worldwide, and many would try to draw lines between Tymiński and other "populists", such as American presidential candidate Donald Trump or Law and Justice chairman Jarosław Kaczyński.
