= 1997 Polish parliamentary election =

- 21 September 1997
- Opinion polls
- Registered: 28,409,054
- Sejm

All 460 seats in the Sejm 231 seats needed for a majority
- Turnout: 13,616,378 (47.93%) ▼4.20pp
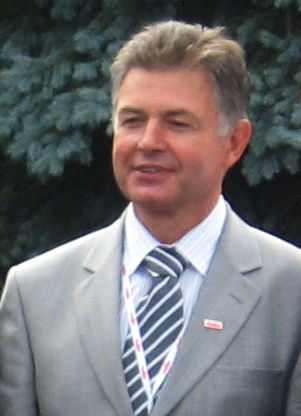

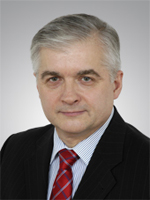

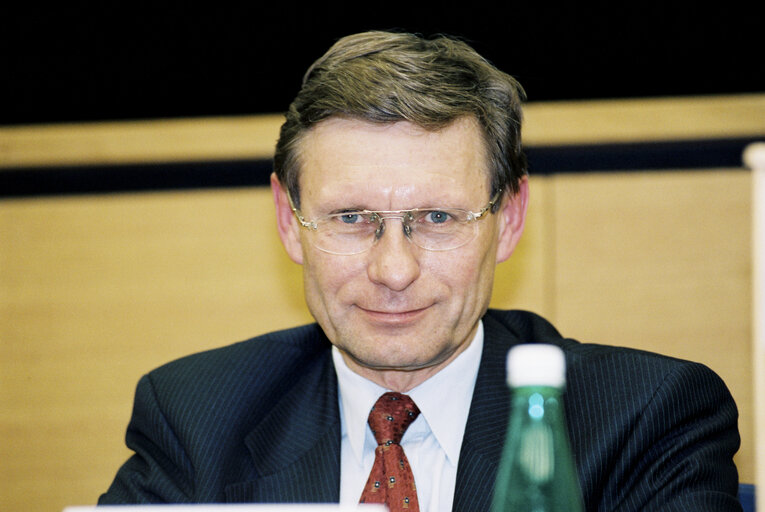

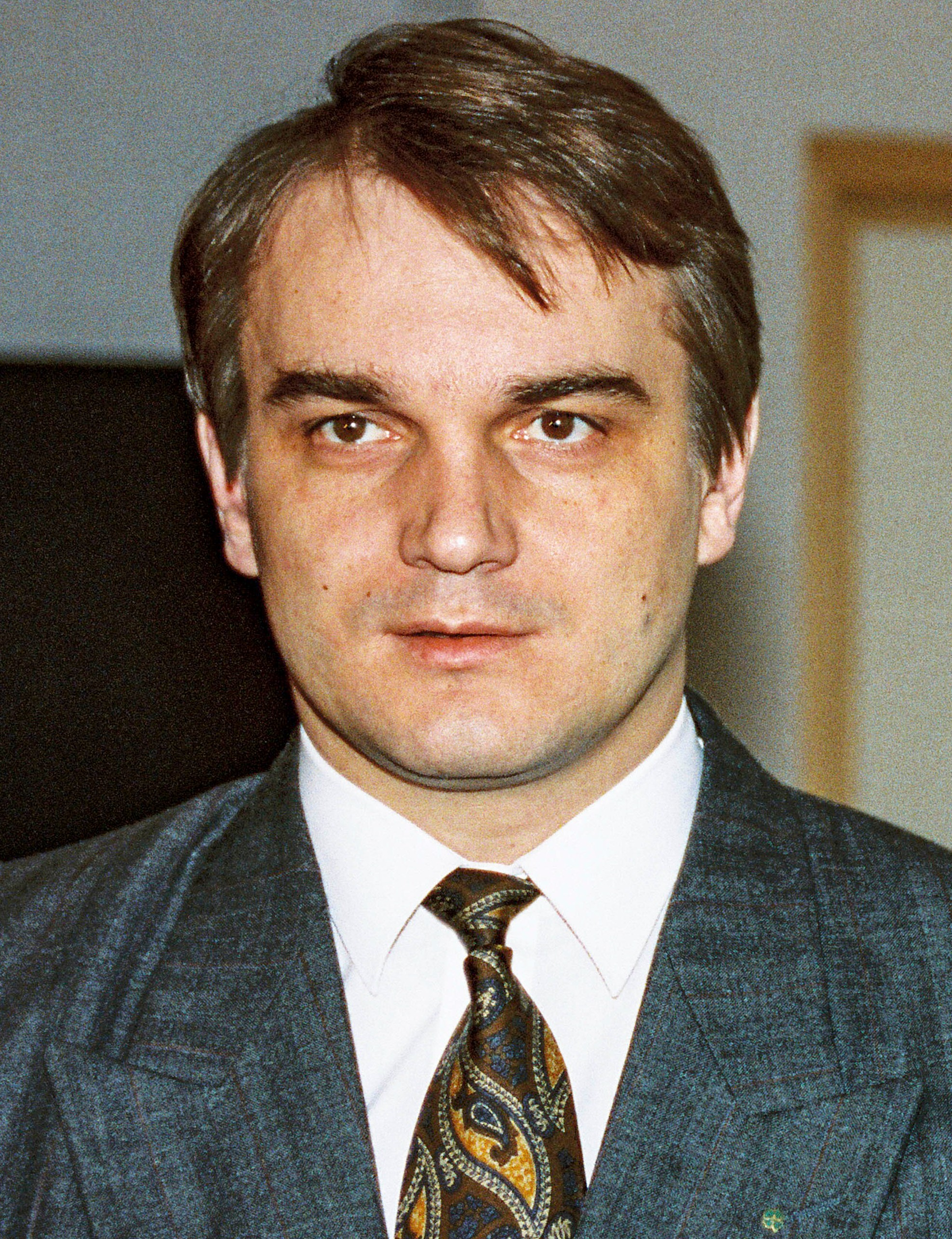

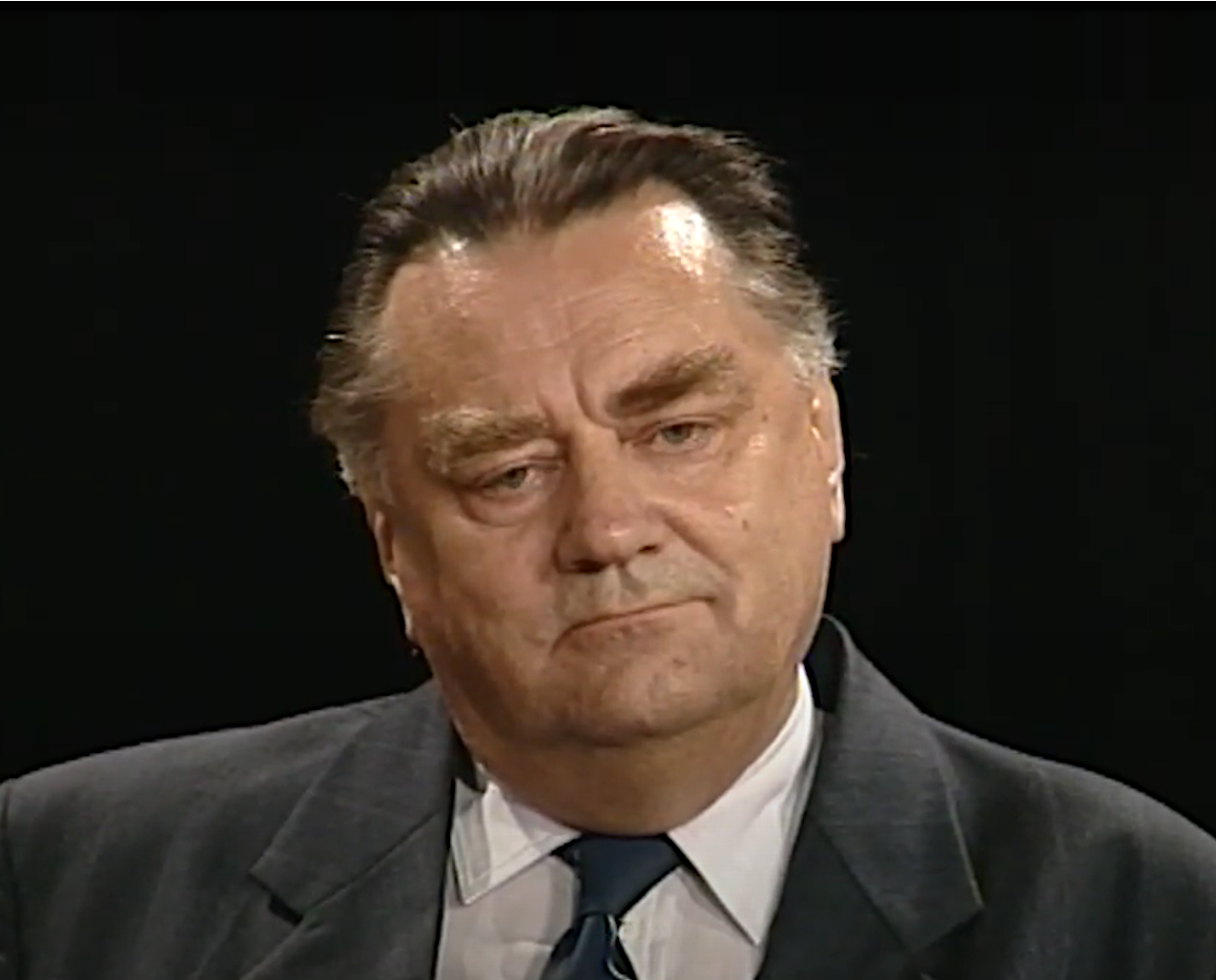

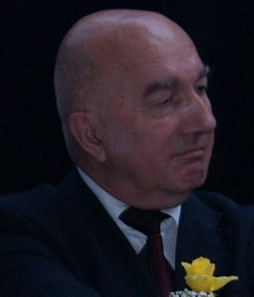
| | Majority party | Minority party | Third party |
|---|---|---|---|
| Leader | Marian Krzaklewski | Włodzimierz Cimoszewicz | Leszek Balcerowicz |
| Party | AWS | SLD | UW |
| Leader since | 8 June 1996 (Note: As the leader of the Solidarity Electoral Action, Krzaklewski was considered the 'natural' candidate for prime minister, but after the election he ultimately decided to pursue his presidential ambitions instead, and nominated Jerzy Buzek for prime minister.) | 7 February 1996 (Note: Cimoszewicz became Prime Minister on 7 February 1996, but was not the leader of SLD.) | 1 April 1995 |
| Last election | 29.2%, 38 seats (Note: Aggregate results for Confederation of Independent Poland (5.77%, 22 seats), Nonpartisan Bloc for Support of Reforms (5.41%, 16 seats), Catholic Electoral Committee "Fatherland" (6.37%, 0 seats), Solidarity lists (4.90%, 0 seats), Centre Agreement – Polish Union (4.42%, 0 seats) and Peasants' Agreement (2.37%, 0 seats). Although the Confederation and Bloc are included, they endured splinters before the election, and did not participate fully as part of the Solidarity Electoral Action, but nevertheless splinters from the party gained seats as part of the AWS alliance. The Bloc also separately fielded candidates in this election with the Bloc for Poland, which earned 1.36% of the vote and no seats.) | 20.4%, 171 seats | 14.6%, 74 seats (Note: Aggregate results for Democratic Union (10.59%, 74 seats) and Liberal Democratic Congress (3.99%, 0 seats).) |
| Seats won | 201 | 164 | 60 |
| Seat change | ▲163 | ▼7 | ▼14 |
| Popular vote | 4,427,373 | 3,551,224 | 1,749,518 |
| Percentage | 33.8% | 27.1% | 13.4% |
| Swing | ▲4.6 pp | ▲6.7 pp | ▼1.2 pp |
| | Fourth party | Fifth party | Sixth party |
| Leader | Waldemar Pawlak | Jan Olszewski | Henryk Kroll |
| Party | PSL | ROP | KWMN |
| Leader since | 29 June 1991 | 18 November 1995 | 23 March 1991 |
| Last election | 15.4%, 132 seats | 2.7%, 0 seats (Note: As Coalition for the Republic.) | 0.7%, 4 seats |
| Seats won | 27 | 6 | 2 |
| Seat change | ▼105 | ▲6 | ▼2 |
| Popular vote | 956,184 | 727,072 | 51,027 |
| Percentage | 7.3% | 5.6% | 0.4% |
| Swing | ▼8.1 pp | ▲2.9% pp | ▼0.3 pp |
- Senate
- All 100 seats in the Senate; 51 seats needed for a majority
- Turnout: 13,587,101 (47.83%) ▼4.27pp
| Party | Vote % | Seats | +/– |
|---|---|---|---|
| AWS | 25.25 | 51 | New |
| SLD | 23.48 | 28 | −9 |
| UW | 11.35 | 8 | +3 |
| ROP | 9.84 | 5 | New |
| PSL | 7.01 | 3 | −33 |
| Independent | 14.66 | 5 | −5 |
This lists parties that won seats. See the complete results below.

| Government before | Government after election |
|---|---|
| Cimoszewicz cabinet SLD (SdRP)—PSL | Buzek cabinet AWS—UW |

Parliamentary elections were held in Poland on 21 September 1997. All 460 members of the Sejm and 100 senators of the Senate were elected. The liberal conservative party Solidarity Electoral Action won the most seats in both chambers of parliament and formed a coalition government with the Freedom Union, another liberal party. The elections were a major setback for the Democratic Left Alliance and the Polish People's Party, which were forced out of government.

== Opinion polls ==
Graphical summary of opinion polls: Solidarity Electoral Action Democratic Left Alliance Freedom Union Polish People's Party Movement for Reconstruction of Poland Labour Union National Party of Retirees and Pensioners Bloc for Poland Confederation of Independent Poland (Note: Contested election under the Solidarity Electoral Action (Polish: Akcja Wyborcza Solidarność) alliance.) Nonpartisan Bloc for Support of Reforms (Note: Contested election under the Solidarity Electoral Action (Polish: Akcja Wyborcza Solidarność) and National–Christian–Democratic Bloc for Poland (Polish: Narodowo–Chrześcijańsko–Demokratyczny Blok dla Polski) alliances.) Solidarity

== Results ==
=== Sejm ===
| Party | Votes | % | Seats | +/– |
|---|---|---|---|---|
| Solidarity Electoral Action | 4,427,373 | 33.83 | 201 | New |
| Democratic Left Alliance | 3,551,224 | 27.13 | 164 | –7 |
| Freedom Union | 1,749,518 | 13.37 | 60 | –14 |
| Polish People's Party | 956,184 | 7.31 | 27 | –105 |
| Movement for Reconstruction of Poland | 727,072 | 5.56 | 6 | New |
| Labour Union | 620,611 | 4.74 | 0 | –41 |
| National Party of Retirees and Pensioners | 284,826 | 2.18 | 0 | New |
| Real Politics Union | 266,317 | 2.03 | 0 | 0 |
| National Alliance of Retirees and Pensioners | 212,826 | 1.63 | 0 | New |
| National Christian Bloc for Poland | 178,395 | 1.36 | 0 | New |
| German Minority Electoral Committee | 51,027 | 0.39 | 2 | –2 |
| Germans of Katowice Province | 16,724 | 0.13 | 0 | – |
| Słowiańska MN RP-Prawosławni | 13,632 | 0.10 | 0 | – |
| Self-Defence of the Republic of Poland | 10,073 | 0.08 | 0 | 0 |
| Polska Wspólnota Narodowa | 8,590 | 0.07 | 0 | – |
| Germans of the Częstochowa Province | 6,206 | 0.05 | 0 | – |
| MN "Pojednanie i Przyszlość" | 3,663 | 0.03 | 0 | – |
| MN Województwa Olsztyńskiego | 1,729 | 0.01 | 0 | – |
| Niezależna i bezpartyjna | 924 | 0.01 | 0 | – |
| Sojusz Ludzi "Polska Praca Sprawiedliwość" | 703 | 0.01 | 0 | – |
| Stow. MN Województwa Elbląskiego | 614 | 0.00 | 0 | – |
| Total | 13,088,231 | 100.00 | 460 | 0 |
| Valid votes | 13,088,231 | 96.12 | | |
| Invalid/blank votes | 528,147 | 3.88 | | |
| Total votes | 13,616,378 | 100.00 | | |
| Registered voters/turnout | 28,409,054 | 47.93 | | |
Source: Nohlen & Stöver

==== By constituency ====
| Constituency | Turnout | AWS | | SLD | | UW | | PSL | | ROP | | MN | | UP | Others | Lead |
| Constituency | Turnout | % | Seats | % | Seats | % | Seats | % | Seats | % | Seats | % | Seats | % | Others | Lead |
|---|---|---|---|---|---|---|---|---|---|---|---|---|---|---|---|---|
| 1 – Warsaw I | 60.86 | 31.88 | 6 | 25.90 | 5 | 21.73 | 4 | 0.94 | 0 | 9.16 | 2 | - | - | 4.98 | 5.41 | 5.98 |
| 2 – Warsaw II | 49.14 | 40.15 | 4 | 19.00 | 2 | 15.30 | 1 | 5.76 | 0 | 8.30 | 1 | - | - | 4.48 | 7.01 | 21.15 |
| 3 – Biała Podlaska | 46.72 | 35.39 | 1 | 19.84 | 1 | 5.86 | 0 | 18.17 | 1 | 6.88 | 0 | - | - | 4.08 | 9.78 | 15.55 |
| 4 – Białystok | 52.12 | 44.29 | 5 | 24.89 | 2 | 7.16 | 0 | 3.48 | 0 | 5.64 | 0 | - | - | 4.42 | 10.12 | 19.40 |
| 5 – Bielsko-Biała | 56.15 | 43.01 | 5 | 21.06 | 2 | 15.59 | 2 | 4.83 | 0 | 4.80 | 0 | - | - | 3.82 | 6.89 | 21.95 |
| 6 – Bydgoszcz | 48.16 | 27.62 | 4 | 36.99 | 5 | 11.50 | 1 | 6.42 | 1 | 4.46 | 0 | - | - | 4.36 | 8.65 | 9.37 |
| 7 – Chełm | 39.26 | 23.89 | 1 | 28.66 | 2 | 7.91 | 0 | 12.83 | 0 | 8.96 | 0 | - | - | 4.58 | 13.17 | 4.77 |
| 8 – Ciechanów | 38.40 | 28.73 | 1 | 29.69 | 2 | 6.86 | 0 | 14.49 | 1 | 6.55 | 0 | - | - | 5.67 | 8.01 | 0.96 |
| 9 – Częstochowa | 45.01 | 30.60 | 3 | 31.36 | 4 | 9.84 | 1 | 6.48 | 0 | 4.82 | 0 | - | - | 5.37 | 11.53 | 0.76 |
| 10 – Elbląg | 40.97 | 26.26 | 2 | 33.92 | 2 | 12.70 | 1 | 6.42 | 0 | 5.97 | 0 | - | - | 6.15 | 8.58 | 7.66 |
| 11 – Gdańsk | 55.01 | 50.10 | 9 | 20.20 | 4 | 13.45 | 2 | 2.08 | 0 | 4.85 | 0 | - | - | 3.00 | 6.32 | 29.90 |
| 12 – Gorzów Wielkopolski | 42.88 | 25.68 | 2 | 35.23 | 2 | 14.14 | 1 | 8.65 | 0 | 3.07 | 0 | - | - | 6.89 | 6.34 | 9.55 |
| 13 – Jelenia Góra | 44.86 | 27.58 | 2 | 35.70 | 2 | 12.39 | 1 | 3.47 | 0 | 3.87 | 0 | - | - | 9.31 | 7.68 | 8.12 |
| 14 – Kalisz | 48.76 | 26.12 | 2 | 32.56 | 3 | 11.62 | 1 | 12.26 | 1 | 4.48 | 0 | - | - | 6.44 | 6.52 | 6.44 |
| 15 – Sosnowiec | 48.80 | 22.51 | 3 | 44.67 | 6 | 12.23 | 1 | 2.96 | 0 | 3.62 | 0 | - | - | 6.58 | 7.43 | 22.16 |
| 16 – Katowice | 44.53 | 31.99 | 7 | 26.92 | 5 | 22.52 | 4 | 3.11 | 0 | 3.26 | 0 | - | - | 4.39 | 7.81 | 5.07 |
| 17 – Gliwice | 45.63 | 34.77 | 6 | 23.10 | 4 | 17.30 | 3 | 2.65 | 0 | 5.04 | 1 | - | - | 4.41 | 11.73 | 10.67 |
| 18 – Kielce | 41.79 | 24.61 | 4 | 31.81 | 5 | 10.41 | 1 | 14.72 | 2 | 5.31 | 0 | - | - | 5.95 | 7.19 | 7.20 |
| 19 – Konin | 48.76 | 27.66 | 2 | 30.56 | 2 | 9.63 | 0 | 12.51 | 1 | 5.03 | 0 | - | - | 6.14 | 8.47 | 2.90 |
| 20 – Koszalin | 41.70 | 22.22 | 1 | 36.11 | 3 | 14.22 | 1 | 4.35 | 0 | 4.33 | 0 | - | - | 4.92 | 13.85 | 13.89 |
| 21 – Kraków | 53.48 | 40.76 | 7 | 17.64 | 3 | 20.60 | 3 | 4.23 | 0 | 4.84 | 0 | - | - | 3.13 | 8.80 | 20.16 |
| 22 – Krosno | 52.79 | 47.20 | 4 | 15.58 | 1 | 7.60 | 0 | 7.03 | 0 | 10.02 | 0 | - | - | 3.69 | 8.88 | 31.62 |
| 23 – Legnica | 44.35 | 32.49 | 2 | 34.88 | 3 | 10.75 | 0 | 4.80 | 0 | 3.93 | 0 | - | - | 5.47 | 7.68 | 2.39 |
| 24 – Leszno | 47.98 | 25.77 | 2 | 33.89 | 2 | 12.67 | 0 | 11.47 | 0 | 2.84 | 0 | - | - | 5.19 | 8.17 | 8.12 |
| 25 – Lublin | 47.06 | 35.41 | 4 | 23.19 | 3 | 9.14 | 1 | 11.64 | 1 | 8.82 | 1 | - | - | 5.31 | 6.49 | 12.22 |
| 26 – Łomża | 46.41 | 47.13 | 3 | 13.96 | 1 | 5.47 | 0 | 11.43 | 0 | 11.02 | 0 | - | - | 4.26 | 6.73 | 33.17 |
| 27 – Łódź | 50.11 | 28.84 | 4 | 37.07 | 5 | 14.83 | 2 | 1.80 | 0 | 6.44 | 0 | - | - | 4.28 | 6.74 | 8.23 |
| 28 – Nowy Sącz | 56.57 | 56.03 | 5 | 10.51 | 1 | 9.91 | 1 | 7.17 | 0 | 3.48 | 0 | - | - | 2.23 | 10.67 | 45.52 |
| 29 – Olsztyn | 42.49 | 25.86 | 3 | 33.40 | 4 | 15.16 | 1 | 5.68 | 0 | 5.61 | 0 | - | - | 5.74 | 8.55 | 7.54 |
| 30 – Opole | 42.19 | 25.50 | 3 | 22.26 | 3 | 13.83 | 2 | 4.92 | 0 | 4.80 | 0 | 16.96 | 2 | 4.97 | 6.76 | 3.24 |
| 31 – Ostrołęka | 42.23 | 35.45 | 2 | 18.04 | 1 | 8.23 | 0 | 15.97 | 1 | 9.23 | 0 | - | - | 4.05 | 9.03 | 17.41 |
| 32 – Piła | 49.81 | 22.80 | 1 | 40.08 | 3 | 12.59 | 1 | 7.43 | 0 | 4.59 | 0 | - | - | 3.72 | 8.79 | 17.28 |
| 33 – Piotrków Trybunalski | 42.59 | 28.99 | 3 | 26.84 | 2 | 9.21 | 1 | 14.11 | 1 | 7.73 | 0 | - | - | 4.57 | 8.55 | 2.15 |
| 34 – Płock | 41.29 | 23.15 | 2 | 30.79 | 2 | 8.38 | 0 | 21.26 | 1 | 4.82 | 0 | - | - | 3.73 | 7.87 | 7.64 |
| 35 – Poznań | 53.26 | 26.95 | 5 | 31.35 | 6 | 18.31 | 3 | 4.71 | 0 | 3.23 | 0 | - | - | 6.80 | 8.65 | 4.4 |
| 36 – Przemyśl | 52.15 | 43.78 | 3 | 15.44 | 1 | 7.85 | 0 | 13.64 | 0 | 5.13 | 0 | - | - | 2.70 | 11.46 | 28.34 |
| 37 – Radom | 43.56 | 32.50 | 3 | 22.05 | 2 | 10.09 | 1 | 14.35 | 1 | 8.41 | 1 | - | - | 4.18 | 8.42 | 10.45 |
| 38 – Rzeszów | 59.81 | 57.81 | 6 | 13.58 | 1 | 6.10 | 0 | 9.14 | 1 | 5.48 | 0 | - | - | 2.56 | 5.33 | 44.23 |
| 39 – Siedlce | 40.40 | 34.73 | 3 | 20.80 | 2 | 6.02 | 0 | 20.59 | 2 | 6.69 | 0 | - | - | 3.65 | 7.52 | 13.93 |
| 40 – Sieradz | 42.35 | 24.96 | 1 | 29.36 | 2 | 8.81 | 0 | 16.74 | 1 | 5.79 | 0 | - | - | 6.84 | 7.50 | 4.4 |
| 41 – Skierniewice | 41.78 | 25.49 | 2 | 24.51 | 1 | 9.65 | 0 | 19.58 | 1 | 6.60 | 0 | - | - | 3.80 | 10.37 | 0.98 |
| 42 – Słupsk | 42.46 | 25.97 | 2 | 35.05 | 2 | 12.83 | 0 | 7.22 | 0 | 3.94 | 0 | - | - | 5.69 | 9.30 | 9.08 |
| 43 – Suwałki | 40.80 | 33.34 | 3 | 27.04 | 2 | 10.57 | 0 | 8.99 | 0 | 5.38 | 0 | - | - | 6.05 | 8.63 | 6.30 |
| 44 – Szczecin | 45.16 | 28.24 | 4 | 34.87 | 4 | 17.28 | 2 | 3.09 | 0 | 3.55 | 0 | - | - | 5.07 | 7.90 | 6.63 |
| 45 – Tarnobrzeg | 46.44 | 39.29 | 3 | 23.73 | 2 | 7.11 | 0 | 11.60 | 1 | 8.00 | 0 | - | - | 2.80 | 7.47 | 15.56 |
| 46 – Tarnów | 53.68 | 51.48 | 5 | 12.20 | 1 | 9.19 | 0 | 11.91 | 1 | 4.88 | 0 | - | - | 3.47 | 6.87 | 39.28 |
| 47 – Toruń | 43.91 | 28.41 | 3 | 32.71 | 3 | 14.09 | 1 | 7.16 | 0 | 4.49 | 0 | - | - | 5.28 | 7.86 | 4.3 |
| 48 – Wałbrzych | 45.31 | 27.69 | 3 | 38.36 | 4 | 11.65 | 1 | 3.86 | 0 | 3.98 | 0 | - | - | 6.68 | 7.78 | 10.67 |
| 49 – Włocławek | 40.41 | 25.16 | 1 | 38.35 | 3 | 7.42 | 0 | 10.83 | 0 | 5.87 | 0 | - | - | 6.19 | 6.18 | 13.19 |
| 50 – Wrocław | 60.86 | 33.02 | 5 | 25.96 | 4 | 20.65 | 3 | 4.04 | 0 | 5.08 | 0 | - | - | 4.57 | 6.68 | 7.06 |
| 51 – Zamość | 46.05 | 33.43 | 2 | 18.95 | 1 | 5.26 | 0 | 24.58 | 2 | 8.45 | 0 | - | - | 3.35 | 5.98 | 8.85 |
| 52 – Zielona Góra | 44.90 | 28.59 | 3 | 37.37 | 3 | 11.70 | 1 | 6.87 | 0 | 3.20 | 0 | - | - | 5.73 | 6.54 | 8.78 |
| National list | - | - | 29 | - | 23 | - | 11 | - | 6 | - | | - | - | - | - | - |
| Poland | 47.93 | 33.83 | 201 | 27.13 | 164 | 13.37 | 60 | 7.31 | 27 | 5.56 | 6 | 0.39 | 2 | 4.74 | 7.67 | 6.70 |

Results of the Sejm election, showing vote strength by electoral district.

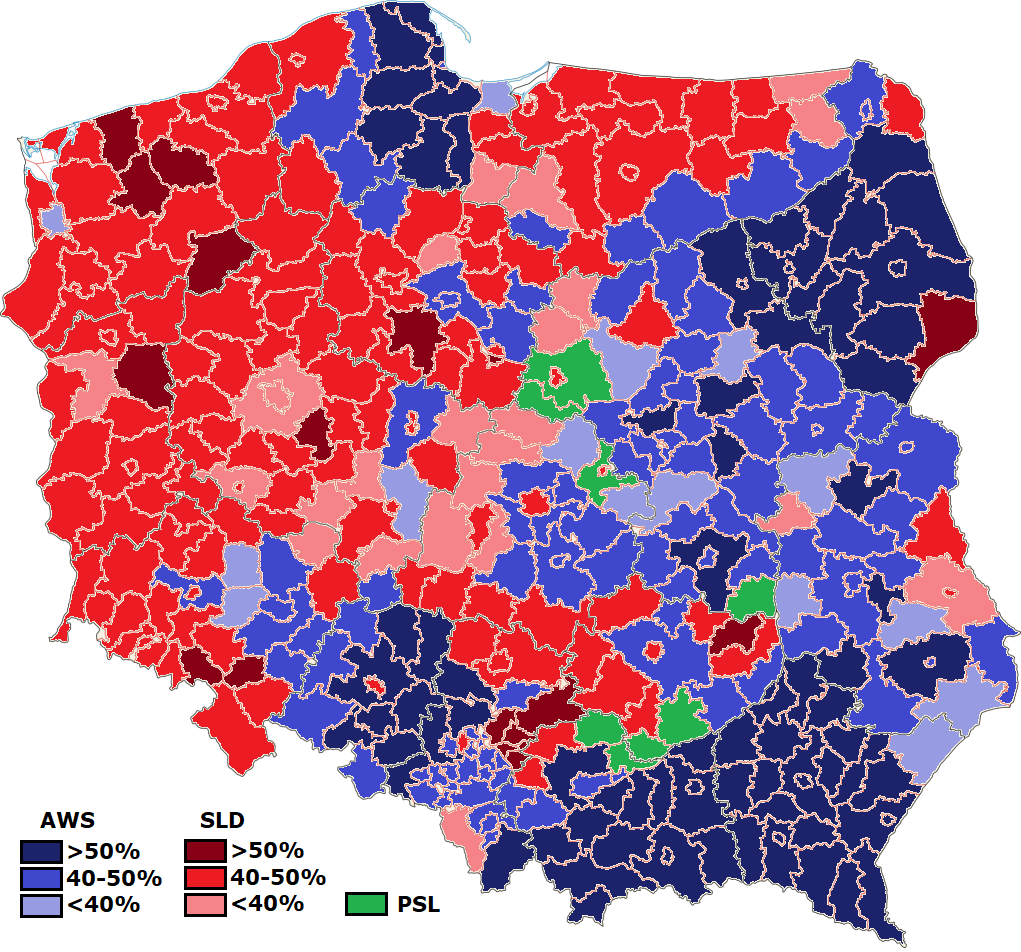
Results of the Sejm election, showing vote strength by powiats (in 1999 borders).

=== Senate ===
| Party | Votes | % | Seats | +/– |
|---|---|---|---|---|
| Solidarity Electoral Action | 6,550,176 | 25.25 | 51 | New |
| Democratic Left Alliance | 6,091,721 | 23.48 | 28 | –9 |
| Freedom Union | 2,943,527 | 11.35 | 8 | +4 |
| Movement for Reconstruction of Poland | 2,553,252 | 9.84 | 5 | New |
| Polish People's Party | 1,819,176 | 7.01 | 3 | –33 |
| National Party of Retirees and Pensioners | 1,112,129 | 4.29 | 0 | New |
| Real Politics Union | 550,254 | 2.12 | 0 | 0 |
| Labour Union | 520,130 | 2.00 | 0 | 0 |
| Local lists and independents | 3,804,084 | 14.66 | 5 | –5 |
| Total | 25,944,449 | 100.00 | 100 | 0 |
| Valid votes | 13,317,952 | 98.02 | | |
| Invalid/blank votes | 269,149 | 1.98 | | |
| Total votes | 13,587,101 | 100.00 | | |
| Registered voters/turnout | 28,409,054 | 47.83 | | |
Source: Nohlen & Stöver

==== By voivodeship ====
| Voivodeship | Total seats | Seats won | | | | | |
| Voivodeship | Total seats | AWS | SLD | UW | ROP | PSL | Others |
|---|---|---|---|---|---|---|---|
| Biała Podlaska | 2 | 2 | | | | | |
| Białystok | 2 | 2 | | | | | |
| Bielsko | 2 | 1 | | 1 | | | |
| Bydgoszcz | 2 | 1 | 1 | | | | |
| Chełm | 2 | 1 | | | | 1 | |
| Ciechanów | 2 | 1 | 1 | | | | |
| Częstochowa | 2 | 1 | 1 | | | | |
| Elbląg | 2 | 1 | 1 | | | | |
| Gdańsk | 2 | 1 | | 1 | | | |
| Gorzów | 2 | 1 | 1 | | | | |
| Jelenia Góra | 2 | 1 | 1 | | | | |
| Kalisz | 2 | 1 | 1 | | | | |
| Katowice | 3 | 1 | 1 | 1 | | | |
| Kielce | 2 | 1 | 1 | | | | |
| Konin | 2 | 1 | 1 | | | | |
| Koszalin | 2 | 1 | 1 | | | | |
| Kraków | 2 | 1 | | 1 | | | |
| Krosno | 2 | 2 | | | | | |
| Legnica | 2 | 1 | 1 | | | | |
| Leszno | 2 | 1 | 1 | | | | |
| Lublin | 2 | 1 | | | 1 | | |
| Łomża | 2 | 2 | | | | | |
| Łódź | 2 | 1 | 1 | | | | |
| Nowy Sącz | 2 | 2 | | | | | |
| Olsztyn | 2 | 1 | 1 | | | | |
| Opole | 2 | 1 | | 1 | | | |
| Ostrołęka | 2 | 1 | | | | | 1 |
| Piła | 2 | | 1 | | | | 1 |
| Piotrków | 2 | 1 | 1 | | | | |
| Płock | 2 | | 1 | | | 1 | |
| Poznań | 2 | | | 1 | | 1 | |
| Przemyśl | 2 | 2 | | | | | |
| Radom | 2 | 1 | 1 | | | | |
| Rzeszów | 2 | 2 | | | | | |
| Siedlce | 2 | 1 | | | 1 | | |
| Sieradz | 2 | 1 | 1 | | | | |
| Skierniewice | 2 | 2 | | | | | |
| Słupsk | 2 | 1 | | 1 | | | |
| Suwałki | 2 | 1 | 1 | | | | |
| Szczecin | 2 | 1 | | | | | 1 |
| Tarnobrzeg | 2 | 2 | | | | | |
| Tarnów | 2 | 1 | | | 1 | | |
| Toruń | 2 | 1 | 1 | | | | |
| Wałbrzych | 2 | | 2 | | | | |
| Warsaw | 3 | 1 | | 1 | 1 | | |
| Włocławek | 2 | | 2 | | | | |
| Wrocław | 2 | | | | | | 2 |
| Zamość | 2 | 1 | | | 1 | | |
| Zielona Góra | 2 | | 2 | | | | |
| Total | 100 | 51 | 28 | 8 | 5 | 3 | 5 |
Source: National Electoral Commission
