= ISO 3166-2:PL =

Entry for Poland in ISO 3166-2

ISO 3166-2:PL is the entry for Poland in ISO 3166-2, part of the ISO 3166 standard published by the International Organization for Standardization (ISO), which defines codes for the names of the principal subdivisions (e.g., provinces or states) of all countries coded in ISO 3166-1.

Currently for Poland, ISO 3166-2 codes are defined for 16 voivodeships.

Each code consists of two parts, separated by a hyphen. The first part is PL, the ISO 3166-1 alpha-2 code of Poland. The second part is two digits.

== Current codes ==
Subdivision names are listed as in the ISO 3166-2 standard published by the ISO 3166 Maintenance Agency (ISO 3166/MA).

Subdivision names are sorted in Polish alphabetical order: a, ą, b-c, ć, d-e, ę, f-l, ł, m-n, ń, o, ó, p-s, ś, t-z, ź, ż.

Click on the button in the header to sort each column.

Code	Subdivision name (pl)	Subdivision name (en) (Note: For reference only, English name not included in the ISO 3166-2 standard.)
PL-02	Dolnośląskie	Lower Silesia
PL-04	Kujawsko-Pomorskie	Kuyavia-Pomerania
PL-06	Lubelskie	Lublin
PL-08	Lubuskie	Lubusz
PL-10	Łódzkie	Łódź
PL-12	Małopolskie	Lesser Poland
PL-14	Mazowieckie	Mazovia
PL-16	Opolskie	Opole
PL-18	Podkarpackie	Subcarpathia
PL-20	Podlaskie	Podlaskie
PL-22	Pomorskie	Pomerania
PL-24	Śląskie	Silesia
PL-26	Świętokrzyskie	Holy Cross
PL-28	Warmińsko-Mazurskie	Warmia-Masuria
PL-30	Wielkopolskie	Greater Poland
PL-32	Zachodniopomorskie	West Pomerania

== Changes ==
The following changes to the entry have been announced by the ISO 3166/MA since the first publication of ISO 3166-2 in 1998. ISO stopped issuing newsletters in 2013.

Newsletter	Date issued	Description of change in newsletter	Code/Subdivision change
Newsletter I-1	2000-06-21	Introduction of a completely new subdivision layout	Subdivision layout: 49 provinces (see below) → 16 provinces
Newsletter II-3	2011-12-13 (corrected 2011-12-15)	Alphabetical re-ordering and source list update.	
Online Browsing; Platform (OBP)	2018-11-26	Change of category name from province to voivodship in eng and from région to voïvodie in fra; Change of subdivision code from PL-DS to PL-02, PL-KP to PL-04, PL-LB to PL-08, PL-LD to PL-10, PL-LU to PL-06, PL-MA to PL-12, PL-MZ to PL-14, PL-OP to PL-16, PL-PD to PL-20, PL-PK to PL-18, PL-PM to PL-22, PL-SK to PL-26, PL-SL to PL-24, PL-WN to PL-28, PL-WP to PL-30 and PL-ZP to PL-32; Update List Source; Update Code Source	Category change: province → voivodship Code changes: DS → 02; KP → 04; LB → 08; LD → 10; LU → 06; MA → 12; MZ → 14; OP → 16; PD → 20; PK → 18; PM → 22; SK → 26; SL → 24; WN → 28; WP → 30; ZP → 32
Online Browsing; Platform (OBP)	2023-11-23	Change of spelling of PL-04, PL-28; Update Code Source and List Source	Name changes: 04 Kujawsko-pomorskie → Kujawsko-Pomorskie; 28 Warmińsko-mazurskie → Warmińsko-Mazurskie

=== Codes before Newsletter I-1 ===
Former code	Subdivision name (pl)
PL-BP	Biała Podlaska
PL-BK	Białystok
PL-BB	Bielsko-Biała
PL-BY	Bydgoszcz
PL-CH	Chełm
PL-CI	Ciechanów
PL-CZ	Częstochowa
PL-EL	Elbląg
PL-GD	Gdańsk
PL-GO	Gorzów
PL-JG	Jelenia Góra
PL-KL	Kalisz
PL-KA	Katowice
PL-KI	Kielce
PL-KN	Konin
PL-KO	Koszalin
PL-KR	Kraków
PL-KS	Krosno
PL-LG	Legnica
PL-LE	Leszno
PL-LU	Lublin
PL-LO	Łomża
PL-LD	Łódź
PL-NS	Nowy Sącz
PL-OL	Olsztyn
PL-OP	Opole
PL-OS	Ostrołęka
PL-PI	Piła
PL-PT	Piotrków
PL-PL	Płock
PL-PO	Poznań
PL-PR	Przemyśl
PL-RA	Radom
PL-RZ	Rzeszów
PL-SE	Siedlce
PL-SI	Sieradz
PL-SK	Skierniewice
PL-SL	Słupsk
PL-SU	Suwałki
PL-SZ	Szczecin
PL-TG	Tarnobrzeg
PL-TA	Tarnów
PL-TO	Toruń
PL-WB	Wałbrzych
PL-WA	Warszawa
PL-WL	Włocławek
PL-WR	Wrocław
PL-ZA	Zamość
PL-ZG	Zielona Góra

=== Codes before 2018-11-26 update ===
Former code	Subdivision name (pl)
PL-DS	Dolnośląskie
PL-KP	Kujawsko-pomorskie
PL-LU	Lubelskie
PL-LB	Lubuskie
PL-LD	Łódzkie
PL-MA	Małopolskie
PL-MZ	Mazowieckie
PL-OP	Opolskie
PL-PK	Podkarpackie
PL-PD	Podlaskie
PL-PM	Pomorskie
PL-SL	Śląskie
PL-SK	Świętokrzyskie
PL-WN	Warmińsko-mazurskie
PL-WP	Wielkopolskie
PL-ZP	Zachodniopomorskie

== See also ==
- Subdivisions of Poland
- FIPS region codes of Poland
- NUTS codes of Poland
- Neighbouring countries: BY, CZ, DE, LT, RU, SK, UA
