= Subdivisions of the Polish People's Republic =

The subdivisions of the Polish People's Republic changed several times from the Republic's inception in 1946 to the latest revision in 1999. The first subdivisions of the Republic involved the territories that were acquired in the west after World War II. They were subsequently reformed in 1946, 1950, 1957 and 1975. The 1975 division survived the fall of communism in 1990. The current administrative subdivisions were finalised in 1999. While they closely resemble the 1945–75 scheme, they have different names since the Communists tended to simply name the voivodeships after their capitals, whereas the current ones use more historical names. In some cases, there were border adjustments.

After World War II, Poland lost 77,000 km^{2} (30,000 sq mi) of eastern regions (Kresy), gaining instead the smaller but much more industrialized so-called "Regained Territories" east of the Oder–Neisse line. This annexation of German territory was agreed by the Allied Powers at the Potsdam Conference in 1945.

The Polish People's Republic was divided into several voivodeships (the Polish unit of administrative division). After World War II, the new administrative divisions were based on the pre-war ones. The areas in the East that were not annexed by the Soviet Union had their borders left almost unchanged. Newly acquired territories in the west and north were organised into the voivodeships of Szczecin, Wrocław, Olsztyn and partially joined to Gdańsk, Katowice and Poznań voivodeships. Two cities were granted voivodeship status: Warsaw and Łódź.

In 1950 new voivodeships were created: Koszalin—previously part of Szczecin, Opole—previously part of Katowice, and Zielona Góra—previously part of Poznań, Wrocław and Szczecin voivodeships. In addition, three other cities were granted voivodeship status: Wrocław, Kraków and Poznań.

In 1973, Polish voivodeships were changed again. This reorganization of administrative division of Poland was mainly a result of local government reform acts of 1973 to 1975. A three-level administrative division (voivodeship, county, commune) was replaced with a two-level administrative division (49 small voivodeships and communes). The three smallest voivodeships: Warsaw, Kraków and Łódź had a special status of municipal voivodeship; the city president (mayor) was also province governor.

The system of division remained in effect after the fall of the People's Republic, until 1999, when a system of larger voivodeships and powiats was again introduced (see Administrative divisions of Poland).

== Poland's voivodeships 1945–1975 (14+2 voivodeships, then 17+5) ==
After World War II, the new administrative division of the country was based on the prewar one. The areas in the east that had not been annexed by the Soviet Union had their borders left almost unchanged. The newly acquired territories in the west and north were organized into the voivodeships of Szczecin, Wrocław and Olsztyn, and partly joined to Gdańsk, Katowice and Poznań voivodeships. Two cities were granted voivodeship status: Warsaw and Łódź.

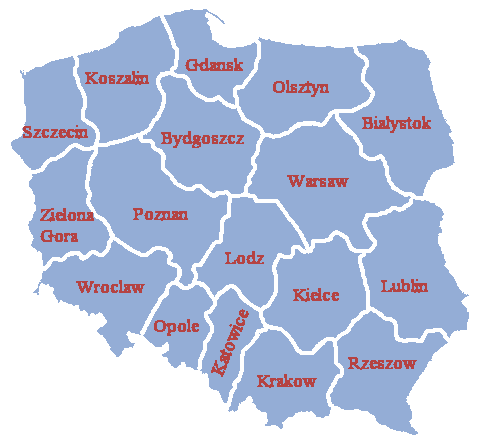

In 1950, new voivodeships were created: Koszalin (previously part of Szczecin), Opole (previously part of Katowice), and Zielona Góra (previously part of Poznań, Wrocław and Szczecin voivodeships). In addition, three more cities were granted voivodeship status: Wrocław, Kraków and Poznań.

Polish administrative divisions 1945–1975
Car plates (since 1956)	Voivodeship	Capital	Area km^{2} (1965)	Population (1965)
A	Białystok	Białystok	23,136	1,160,400
B	Bydgoszcz	Bydgoszcz	20,794	1,837,100
G	Gdańsk	Gdańsk	10,984	1,352,800
S	Katowice	Katowice	9,518	3,524,300
C	Kielce	Kielce	19,498	1,899,100
E	Koszalin¹	Koszalin	17,974	755,100
K	Krakow	Kraków	15,350	2,127,600
F	Łódz	Łódź	17,064	1,665,200
L	Lublin	Lublin	24,829	1,900,500
O	Olsztyn	Olsztyn	20,994	956,600
H	Opole ¹	Opole	9,506	1,009,200
P	Poznań	Poznań	26,723	2,126,300
R	Rzeszów	Rzeszów	18,658	1,692,800
M	Szczecin	Szczecin	12,677	847,600
T	Warsaw	Warsaw	29,369	2,453,000
X	Wrocław	Wrocław	18,827	1,967,000
Z	Zielona Góra ¹	Zielona Góra	14,514	847,200
car plates (since 1956)	Separate city		Area km^{2} (1965)	Population (1965)
I	Łódź		214	744,100
W	Warsaw		446	1,252,600
K	Kraków ²		230	520,100
P	Poznań ²		220	438,200
X	Wrocław ²		225	474,200
^{1} – new voivodeships created in 1950; ^{2} – cities separated in 1957

== Poland's voivodeships 1975–1998 (49 voivodeships) ==
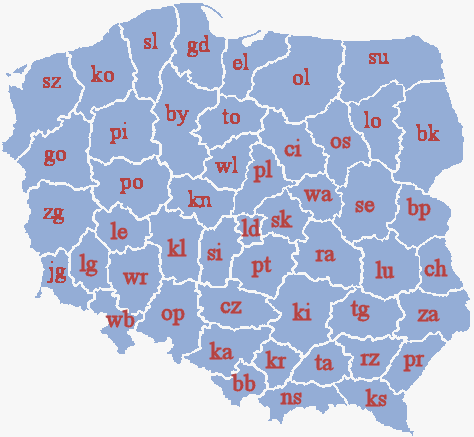

This reorganization of the administrative division of Poland was mainly a result of the local government reform acts of 1973–1975. In place of the three-level administrative division (voivodeship, county, commune), a new two-level administrative division was introduced (49 small voivodeships, and communes). The three smallest voivodeships—Warsaw, Kraków and Łódź—had the special status of municipal voivodeships; those cities' presidents (mayors) were also their provincial governors.

Polish voivodeships and separate cities 1975–1998
Abbreviation	Voivodeship	Capital	Area km^{2} (1998)	Population (1980)	No. of cities	No. of communes
bp	Biała Podlaska Voivodeship	Biała Podlaska	5,348	286,400	6	35
bk	Białystok Voivodeship	Białystok	10,055	641,100	17	49
bb	Bielsko-Biała Voivodeship	Bielsko-Biała	3,704	829,900	18	47
by	Bydgoszcz Voivodeship	Bydgoszcz	10,349	1,036,000	27	55
ch	Chełm Voivodeship	Chełm	3,865	230,900	4	25
ci	Ciechanów Voivodeship	Ciechanów	6,362	405,400	9	45
cz	Częstochowa Voivodeship	Częstochowa	6,182	747,900	17	49
el	Elbląg Voivodeship	Elbląg	6,103	441,500	15	37
gd	Gdańsk Voivodeship	Gdańsk	7,394	1,333,800	19	43
go	Gorzów Voivodeship	Gorzów Wielkopolski	8,484	455,400	21	38
jg	Jelenia Góra Voivodeship	Jelenia Góra	4,378	492,600	24	28
kl	Kalisz Voivodeship	Kalisz	6,512	668,000	20	53
ka	Katowice Voivodeship	Katowice	6,650	3,733,900	43	46
ki	Kielce Voivodeship	Kielce	9,211	1,068,700	17	69
kn	Konin Voivodeship	Konin	5,139	441,200	18	43
ko	Koszalin Voivodeship	Koszalin	8,470	462,200	17	35
kr	Kraków Voivodeship	Kraków	3,254	1,167,500	10	38
ks	Krosno Voivodeship	Krosno	5,702	448,200	12	37
lg	Legnica Voivodeship	Legnica	4,037	458,900	11	31
le	Leszno Voivodeship	Leszno	4,254	357,600	19	28
lu	Lublin Voivodeship	Lublin	6,793	935,200	16	62
lo	Łomża Voivodeship	Łomża	6,684	325,800	12	39
ld	Łódź Voivodeship	Łódź	1,523	1,127,800	8	11
ns	Nowy Sącz Voivodeship	Nowy Sącz	5,576	628,800	14	41
ol	Olsztyn Voivodeship	Olsztyn	12,327	681,400	21	48
op	Opole Voivodeship	Opole	8,535	975,000	29	61
os	Ostrołęka Voivodeship	Ostrołęka	6,498	371,400	9	38
pi	Piła Voivodeship	Piła	8,205	437,100	24	35
pt	Piotrków Voivodeship	Piotrków Trybunalski	6,266	604,200	10	51
pl	Płock Voivodeship	Płock	5,117	496,100	9	44
po	Poznań Voivodeship	Poznań	8,151	1,237,800	33	57
pr	Przemyśl Voivodeship	Przemyśl	4,437	380,000	9	35
rs	Radom Voivodeship	Radom	7,295	702,300	15	61
rz	Rzeszów Voivodeship	Rzeszów	4,397	648,900	13	41
se	Siedlce Voivodeship	Siedlce	8,499	616,300	12	66
si	Sieradz Voivodeship	Sieradz	4,869	392,300	9	40
sk	Skierniewice Voivodeship	Skierniewice	3,959	396,900	8	36
sl	Słupsk Voivodeship	Słupsk	7,453	369,800	11	31
su	Suwałki Voivodeship	Suwałki	10,490	422,600	14	42
sz	Szczecin Voivodeship	Szczecin	9,981	897,900	29	50
tg	Tarnobrzeg Voivodeship	Tarnobrzeg	6,283	556,300	14	46
ta	Tarnów Voivodeship	Tarnów	4,151	607,000	9	41
to	Toruń Voivodeship	Toruń	5,348	610,800	13	41
wb	Wałbrzych Voivodeship	Wałbrzych	4,168	716,100	31	30
wa	Warsaw Voivodeship	Warsaw	3,788	2,319,100	27	32
wl	Włocławek Voivodeship	Włocławek	4,402	413,400	14	30
wr	Wrocław Voivodeship	Wrocław	6,287	1,076,200	16	33
za	Zamość Voivodeship	Zamość	6,980	472,100	5	47
zg	Zielona Góra Voivodeship	Zielona Góra	8,868	609,200	26	50
