= Władysław Baka =

Polish economist and politician (1936–2021)

President of the National Bank of Poland
- In office 12 September 1989 – 24 January 1991
- Preceded by: Zdzisław Pakuła
- Succeeded by: Grzegorz Wójtowicz
- In office 13 November 1985 – 13 July 1988
- Preceded by: Zdzisław Pakuła (acting)
- Succeeded by: Zdzisław Pakuła

Polish Minister without Portfolio in the Council of Ministers
- In office 3 July 1981 – 12 November 1985

Personal details
- Born: 24 March 1936 Boksycka, Second Polish Republic
- Died: 3 March 2021 (aged 84)
- Party: PZPR

Władysław Baka (24 March 1936 – 3 March 2021) was a Polish economist, politician, and banker. He was a Minister without Portfolio in the Council of Ministers, President of the National Bank of Poland from 1985 to 1988 and again from 1989 to 1991, and served on the Politburo of the Polish United Workers' Party from 1988 to 1989.

== Biography ==
The son of Władysław and Marta, Baka graduated from the Faculty of Economics at the University of Warsaw in 1958. He obtained a doctoral degree in 1971, became an associate professor in 1977, and a full professor in 1989. From 1975 to 1981, he supervised the Committee of Economic Sciences of the Polish Academy of Sciences.

In 1955, Baka joined the Polish United Workers' Party and served on its Central Committee. From 1972 to 1973, he headed the committee's propaganda department and subsequently worked in its economic departments. From 1981 to 1985, he was a minister without portfolio in the Council of Ministers, where he helped to plan economic reform. From 1985 to 1988 and 1989 to 1991, he was president of the National Bank of Poland. He represented the communist government for their social and economic policy in the 1989 Polish Round Table Agreement. He also served on the Consultative Council of the Polish Council of State's chairman. He represented Poland at the World Bank in the late 1980s. He unsuccessfully ran for the Sejm in 1989.

In 2005, President Aleksander Kwaśniewski awarded Baka the Grand Cross of the Order of Polonia Restituta "in recognition of his outstanding contribution to the development of the financial system in Poland, for achievements in research and teaching". He had previously been awarded the Order's Knight's Cross, Commander's Cross, and the Commander's Cross with Star.

Władysław Baka died on 3 March 2021 at the age of 84.
