= Thick line =

Political phrase used in Poland in 1989

- A photograph of Mazowiecki embracing West German Chancellor Helmut Kohl in Krzyżowa, publicly drawing a thick line under Polish-German political relations. November 1989
- Origin: Speech delivered to the Sejm
- Original form: gruba linia
- Context: End of communism in Poland
- Coined by: Tadeusz Mazowiecki
- Meaning: Post-communist reconcilliation

The thick line (Polish: gruba linia, or gruba kreska, lit. 'thick stroke') was the term used by Prime Minister of Poland, Tadeusz Mazowiecki, in an exposé_{[pl]} he delivered to the Contract Sejm, on 12 September 1989.

He said, "We split away the history of our recent past with a thick line. We will be responsible only for what we have done to help extract Poland from her current predicament, from now on". (Przeszłość odkreślamy grubą linią. Odpowiadać będziemy jedynie za to, co uczyniliśmy, by wydobyć Polskę z obecnego stanu załamania.)

In more recent years, his intentions have been reconsidered, and his gruba kreska is often understood as a policy of nonpunishment for crimes committed by the communist regime of pre-1989 Poland.

== See also ==
- Polish Round Table Agreement
- Lustration in Poland
- Vergangenheitsbewältigung
- Red line
