= Bolesław Tejkowski =

Polish sociologist, engineer, academic, and politician (1933–2022)

President of the Polish National Community
- In office 12 December 1990 – 4 June 2022

Personal details
- Born: Bernard Tejkowski; 15 December 1933 Kruszwica, Poland
- Died: 4 June 2022 (aged 88) Poland
- Party: PWN
- Education: Tadeusz Kościuszko University of Technology; Jagiellonian University; University of Warsaw; Adam Mickiewicz University in Poznań
- Occupation: Sociologist; Engineer; Professor

Bolesław Tejkowski (15 December 1933 – 4 June 2022) was a Polish sociologist, engineer, academic, and politician.

He was president of the Polish National Community from 1990 to 2022.

Tejkowski died on 4 June 2022 at the age of 88.
