= Five-point electoral law =

Five-point electoral law (Polish: wybory pięcioprzymiotnikowe; the term has also been translated to English as five-point elections, five-adjective elections or five-adjective principle in electoral law) is a concept used in Polish political science referring to the elections that are:

- universal
- direct
- equal
- proportional
- anonymous (secret ballot).

In Polish discourse, the term is also equivalent to calling elections that are fair and democratic.

A similar concept is used in elections to the Israeli Knesset, with a sixth adjective, "national (no constituencies)", added, and "general" used instead of "universal".
