= Rzeszów Voivodeship =

Former administrative division of Poland

Coordinates: 50°02′19″N 21°59′37″E

Rzeszów Voivodeship Województwo rzeszowskie
- Voivodeship of Poland
- 1945–1998
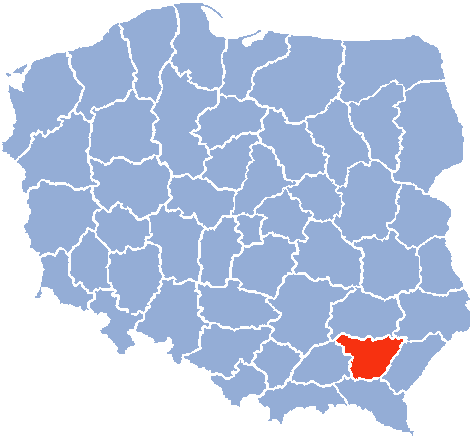
- Location of Rzeszów Voivodeship (2) within Poland
- Capital: Rzeszów
- Area
- 4,397 km^{2} (1,698 sq mi)
  - Type: Republic
- Historical era: 20th century
  - Established: 1945
  - Reformed: 1975
  - Disestablished: 1998
- Subdivisions
  - Type: Gminas
Preceded by	Succeeded by
Lwów Voivodeship; Drohobych Oblast	Krosno Voivodeship; Podkarpackie Voivodeship
- Today part of: Podkarpackie Voivodeship

Rzeszów Voivodeship (Polish: województwo rzeszowskie) can refer to one of two political entities in Poland:

Rzeszów Voivodeship (1) was a unit of administrative division and local government in Poland from 1945 to 1975, superseded by Rzeszów (2), Przemyśl, Krosno and parts of Tarnów and Tarnobrzeg voivodeships. Its creation was the result of the Polish–Soviet border agreement of August 1945. The traditional centre of the region, Lwów, was re-annexed by the Soviet Union and incorporated into the Ukrainian SSR. Due to this, the Polish government had to come up with a new provincial city, which would have taken the role of Lwów. As Przemyśl, which was the second biggest city of the area (after Lwów), is located too close to the border, the new capital was organized in Rzeszów, a city in 1945 much smaller than Przemyśl.

Rzeszów Voivodeship (2) was a unit of administrative division and local government from 1975 to 1998, superseded by the Podkarpackie Voivodeship. Major cities and towns included (population in 1995 in brackets):

- Its capital city, Rzeszów (160,300)
- Mielec (64,400),
- Łańcut (18.000).

== See also ==
- Voivodeships of Poland
