= Nowy Sącz Voivodeship =

Administrative area in southern Poland

Coordinates: 49°37′28″N 20°41′35″E

Nowy Sacz Voivodeship

Nowy Sacz Voivodeship (Polish: województwo nowosądeckie) was a unit of administrative division and local government, located in southern Poland in the years 1975–1998, superseded by Lesser Poland Voivodeship. Its capital city was Nowy Sącz.

== Major cities and towns (population in 1995) ==
- Nowy Sącz (82,100)
- Nowy Targ (34,000)
- Gorlice (30,200)
- Zakopane (30,000)
- Limanowa (15,000)
- Rabka
- Szczawnica
- Jordanów

== See also ==
- Voivodeships of Poland
