= Jelenia Góra Voivodeship =

Former Polish Voivodeship

Coordinates: 50°54′12″N 15°44′04″E

Jelenia Góra Voivodeship Województwo jeleniogórskie
- Voivodeship of Poland
- 1975–1998
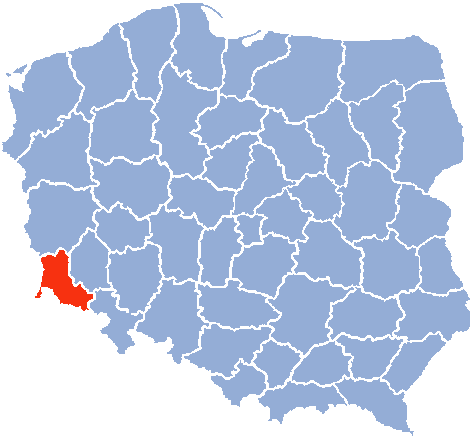
- Capital: Jelenia Góra
- Area
- 4,379 km^{2} (1,691 sq mi)
- History
  - Established: 1975
  - Disestablished: 1998
- Today part of: Poland

Jelenia Góra Voivodeship (Polish: województwo jeleniogórskie) was a unit of administrative division and local government in the Polish People's Republic in the years 1975–1998, superseded by the Lower Silesian Voivodeship. Its capital city was Jelenia Gora.

== Major cities and towns (population in 1995) ==
- Jelenia Góra (93,500)
- Bolesławiec (44,400)
- Zgorzelec (36,800)
- Lubań (24,400)
- Kamienna Góra (23,600)
- Bogatynia (20,000)
- Kowary (13,000)
- Lwówek Śląski (9,000)

== See also ==
- Voivodeships of Poland
