= Katowice Voivodeship =

Former unit of administrative division in Silesia

Coordinates: 50°15′20″N 19°01′14″E

Katowice Voivodeship Województwo katowickie
- Voivodeship of Poland
- 1950–1998
- Coat of arms (from 1975)

- Location of the voivodeship within Poland, 1950–1975

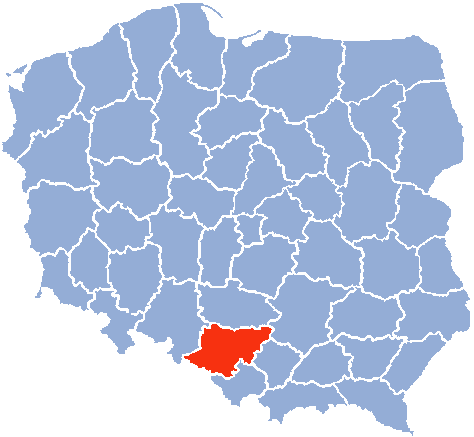
- Location of the voivodeship within Poland, 1975–1998
- Capital: Katowice
- Demonym: Silesians
- Area
- 6,650 km^{2} (2,570 sq mi)
- Government
  - Type: Republic
- Voivode
  - 1997: Marek Kempski
- Historical era: 20th century
  - Established: 1950
  - Renamed Stalinogród Voivodeship: 1953–1956
  - Reformed: 1975
  - Disestablished: 1998
- Subdivisions
  - Type: Gminas
Preceded by
Silesian Voivodeship
Succeeded by
Bielsko Voivodeship
Częstochowa Voivodeship
Silesian Voivodeship
Opole Voivodeship
- Today part of: Third Polish Republic

Katowice Voivodeship (Polish: województwo katowickie) can refer to one of two political entities in Poland:

Katowice Voivodeship (1), formed from the Silesian-Dąbrowa Voivodeship (Polish: województwo śląsko-dąbrowskie), and later renamed Stalinogród Voivodeship (Polish: województwo stalinogrodzkie) between 1953 and 1956, was a unit of administrative division and local government in the years 1950–1975. It was superseded by Katowice Voivodeship (2), Częstochowa Voivodeship, Bielsko-Biała Voivodeship, and Opole Voivodeship. Its capital city was Katowice.

Katowice Voivodeship (2) was a unit of administrative division and local government in Poland in the years 1975–1998, superseded by the Silesian Voivodeship. Its capital city was Katowice. The Katowice Special Economic Zone was created on 18 June 1996 "in order to support and advance restructuring processes, as well as to generate employment in the region." In a 1995 issue of the journal Habitat Debate, it was reported that two-thirds of the rivers in the voivodeship were below the lowest pollution quality classification and that air pollution was also extremely high, with lead levels up to 13 times the allowable standard being measured.

== Major cities and towns ==
Population in 1995 in brackets

- Katowice (354,200)
- Sosnowiec (249,000)
- Bytom (227,600)
- Gliwice (214,000)
- Zabrze (201,600)
- Ruda Śląska (166,300)
- Rybnik (144,300)
- Tychy (133,900)
- Dąbrowa Górnicza (130,900)
- Chorzów (125,800)
- Jastrzębie-Zdrój (103,500)
- Jaworzno (98,500)
- Mysłowice (80,000)
- Siemianowice Śląskie (78,100)
- Wodzisław Śląski (68,600)
- Tarnowskie Góry (67,200)
- Piekary Śląskie (67,200)
- Żory (66,300)
- Racibórz (65,100)
- Będzin (63,100)
- Świętochłowice (59,600)
- Zawiercie (56,300)
- Knurów (44,200)
- Chrzanów (42,100)
- Olkusz (40,500)
- Mikołów (38,900)
- Czeladź (36,600)
- Czechowice-Dziedzice (35,600)
- Pszczyna (34,600)
- Czerwionka-Leszczyny (30,100)
- Rydułtowy (24,100)
- Łaziska Górne (23,000)
- Bieruń (22,100)
- Pyskowice (21,900)
- Trzebinia (20,000)
- Brzeszcze (12,441)

== See also ==
- Voivodeships of Poland
