= Bydgoszcz Voivodeship =

Former administrative division in Poland

Coordinates: 53°07′31″N 18°00′28″E

Bydgoszcz Voivodeship Województwo Bydgoskie
- Voivodeship of Poland
- 1975–1998
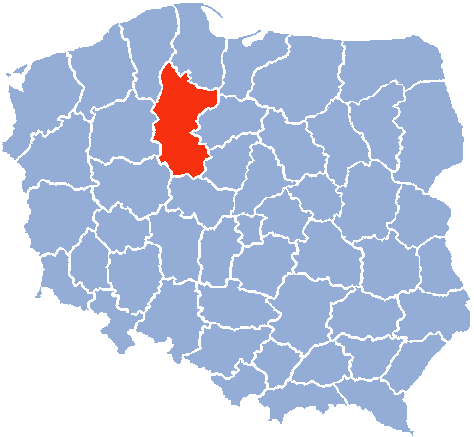
- The Gdańsk Voivodeship within Poland during 1975.
- Capital: Bydgoszcz
- Area
  - 1998: 10,349 km^{2} (3,996 sq mi)
- Population
  - 1998: 1,135,200
- Government
  - Type: Voivodeship
- History
  - Established: 1975
  - Disestablished: 1998
- Contained within
  - Country: Polish People's Republic (1975-1989); Republic of Poland (1989–1998)
Preceded by	Succeeded by
Pomeranian Voivodeship	Kuyavian–Pomeranian Voivodeship

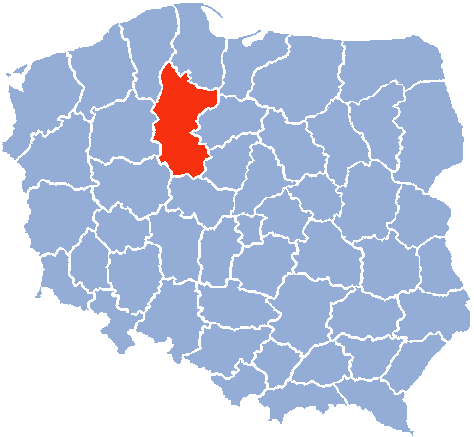

Bydgoszcz Voivodeship (Polish: województwo bydgoskie) was a unit of administrative division and local government in Poland in the years 1975–1998, superseded by Kuyavian-Pomeranian Voivodeship.

== Statistics ==
Capital city: Bydgoszcz
Area: 10,359
Statistics (1998):
Population: 1,135,200 inhabitants
Population density: 110 inhabitants/km^{2}
Administrative division: communes
Number of cities and towns (urban communes):

Major cities and towns (population 1995):

- Bydgoszcz (385,800)
- Inowrocław (79,400)
- Chojnice (39,800)
- Świecie (27,000)
- Nakło nad Notecią (20,100)
- Mogilno (13,000)

== Bydgoszcz Voivodeship 1946–1975 ==
Bydgoszcz Voivodeship 1946–1975 was a unit of administrative division and local government in Poland in the years 1946–1975. Initially called the Pomeranian Voivodeship, it was created from the southern part of the pre-war Pomeranian Voivodeship and superseded by the voivodeships of Bydgoszcz, Toruń and Włocławek.
Capital city: Bydgoszcz
Area: ?
Population: ?
Urban population: ?
Population density: ?

=== List of counties in 1946 ===
English county name, Polish county name, capital city

- Bydgoszcz City, miasto Bydgoszcz
- Toruń City, miasto Toruń
- Brodnica County, powiat brodnicki, Brodnica
- Bydgoszcz County, powiat bydgoski, Bydgoszcz
- Chełmno County, powiat chełmiński, Chełmno
- Chojnice County, powiat chojnicki, Chojnice
- Grudziądz County, powiat grudziądzki, Grudziądz
- Inowrocław County, powiat inowroclawski, Inowrocław
- Lipno County, powiat lipnowski, Lipno
- Lubawa County, powiat lubawski, Lubawa
- Nieszawa County, powiat nieszawski, Nieszawa
- Rypin County, powiat rypiński, Rypin
- Sepolno County, powiat sępoleński, Sepolno Krajenskie
- Świecie County, powiat świecki, Świecie
- Szubin County, powiat szubiński, Szubin
- Toruń County, powiat toruński, Toruń
- Tuchola County, powiat tucholski, Tuchola
- Wąbrzeźno County, powiat wąbrzeski, Wąbrzeźno
- Włocławek County, powiat włocławski, Włocławek
- Wyrzysk County, powiat wyrzyski, Wyrzysk

New counties established 1946–1975:

- Mogilno County, powiat mogileński, Mogilno, transferred from Poznań Voivodeship
- Żnin County, powiat żniński, Żnin, transferred from Poznań Voivodeship
- Inowrocław City, miasto Inowrocław, previously part of Inowrocław County
- Włocławek City, miasto Włoclawek, previously part of Włoclawek County
- Aleksandrów County, powiat aleksandrowski, Aleksandrów Kujawski, previously part of Nieszawa County
- Radziejów County, powiat radziejowski, Radziejów, previously part of Aleksandrów County
- Golub-Dobrzyń County, powiat golubsko-dobrzyński, Golub-Dobrzyń, previously part of Rypin County

Abolished counties:

- Lubawa County, powiat lubawski, Lubawa, transferred to Olsztyn Voivodeship
- Nieszawa County, powiat nieszawski, Nieszawa, renamed Aleksandrów County
