= Konin Voivodeship =

Former administrative division of Poland

Coordinates: 52°12′41″N 18°15′19″E

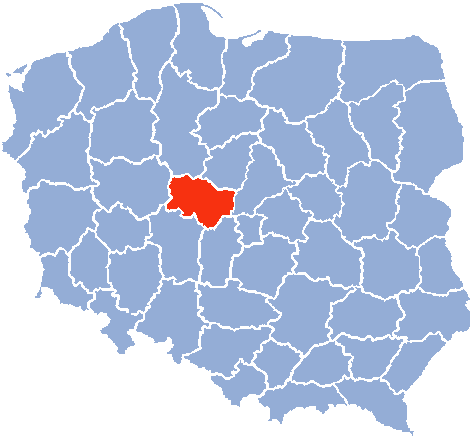
Konin Voivodeship

Konin Voivodeship (Polish: województwo konińskie) was a unit of administrative division and local government in Poland from 1975 to 1998, when it was superseded by the Greater Poland Voivodeship. Its capital city was Konin. The voivodeship contained 18 towns and 48 municipalities.

== Major cities and towns (population in 1995) ==
- Konin (81,700)
- Turek (30,100)
- Koło (23,600)

== See also ==
- Voivodeships of Poland
