= Chełm Voivodeship =

Former administrative division of Poland

Coordinates: 51°08′11″N 23°28′30″E

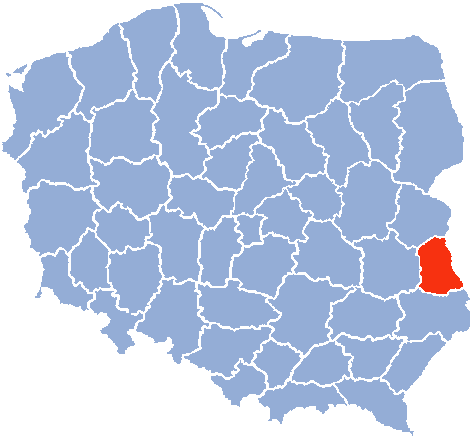
Chelm Voivodeship

Chełm Voivodeship (Polish: województwo chełmskie) was a unit of administrative division and local government in Poland in years 1975–1998, superseded by Lublin Voivodeship. Its capital city was Chełm.

== Major cities and towns (population in 1995) ==
- Chełm (69,100)
- Krasnystaw (20,600)

== See also ==
- Voivodeships of Poland
