= Zamość Voivodeship =

Coordinates: 50°43′14″N 23°15′31″E

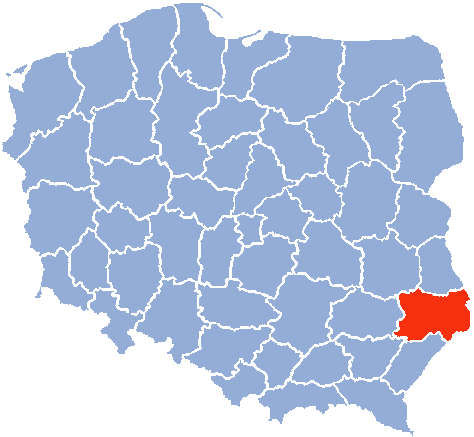
Zamość Voivodeship on the map of Poland

Zamość Voivodeship (Polish: województwo zamojskie) was a unit of administrative division and local government (voivodeship) in Poland in years 1975–1998, superseded by Lublin Voivodeship.

Its capital and largest city was Zamość (population 65,021). Other cities in the voivodeship included Biłgoraj (27,290), Tomaszów Lubelski (18,396), and Hrubieszów (15,925).

== See also ==
- Voivodeships of Poland
