= Kielce Voivodeship =

Former administrative division of Poland

Coordinates: 50°52′10″N 20°37′43″E

- Historical divisions 1919–1998
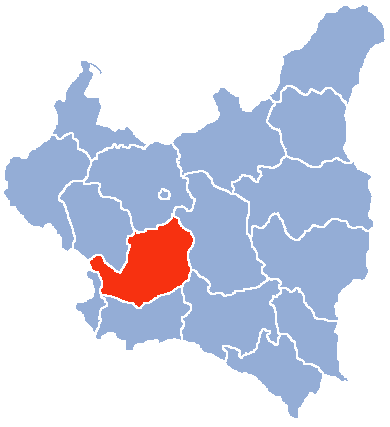
- Second Polish Republic, 1919-1939

- Postwar Poland, 1946-1950

- 1950-1975

- 1975-1998

Kielce Voivodeship (Polish: województwo kieleckie) is a former unit of administrative division and the local government in Poland. It was originally formed during Poland's return to independence in the aftermath of World War One, and recreated within the new Polish borders after the defeat of Nazi Germany in World War Two.

== History ==
=== 1921-1938 ===
Kielce Voivodeship was a unit of administrative division and local government in Poland in years 1921-1939. Back then, it covered a large chunk of central part of the country, including such cities as Radom, Częstochowa and Sosnowiec. On 1 April 1938 its borders changed, see: Territorial changes of Polish Voivodeships on 1 April 1938).

After the change, Voivodeship's area was 22,204 square kilometers, with a population of 2,671,000. Between 1 April 1938 - 1 September 1939 it consisted of 18 powiats (counties). These were:

- Będzin county,
- Częstochowa county,
- city of Częstochowa county (powiat czestochowski grodzki),
- Iłża county,
- Jędrzejów county,
- Kielce county,
- Kozienice county,
- Miechów county,
- Olkusz county,
- Opatów county,
- Pińczów county,
- Radom county,
- city of Radom county (powiat radomski grodzki),
- Sandomierz county,
- city of Sosnowiec county (powiat sosnowiecki grodzki),
- Stopnica county,
- Włoszczowa county,
- Zawiercie county.

Capital city: Kielce. According to the 1931 Polish census, the largest cities in Kielce Voivodeship were:

- Częstochowa (pop. 117 200),
- Sosnowiec (pop. 109 000),
- Radom (pop. 77 900),
- Kielce (pop. 58 200),
- Będzin (pop. 47 600),
- Dąbrowa Górnicza (pop. 36 900),
- Zawiercie (pop. 32 900),
- Ostrowiec Świętokrzyski (pop. 25 900).

=== 1945-1975 ===
Kielce Voivodeship was a unit of administrative division and local government in post-war Poland and the Polish People's Republic in the years 1945–1975. It was downsized in 1975, with parts of its territory going to Radom Voivodeship and partly Tarnobrzeg Voivodeship.

Capital city: Kielce

=== 1975-1998 ===
Coat of Arms of the Kielce Voivodeship

In years 1975–1998, superseded by Świętokrzyskie Voivodeship.

Capital city: Kielce

Major cities and towns: (population in 1995):

- Kielce (213,700);
- Ostrowiec Świętokrzyski (79,200);
- Starachowice (57,500);
- Skarżysko-Kamienna (51,400);
- Końskie (22,300).

== See also ==
- Voivodeships of Poland
