= Skierniewice Voivodeship =

Former administrative division of Poland

Coordinates: 51°57′15″N 20°08′35″E

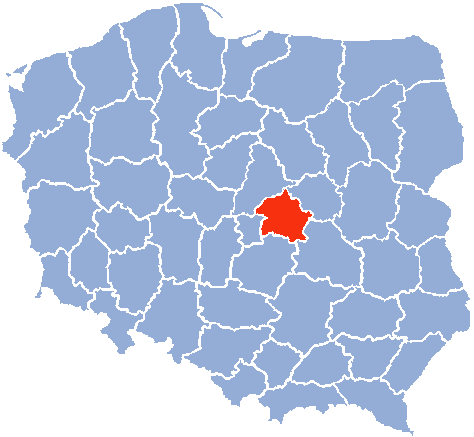
Skierniewice Voivodeship

Skierniewice Voivodeship (Polish: województwo skierniewickie) was a unit of administrative division and local government in Poland from 1975 to 1998, superseded by Łódź Voivodeship and Masovian Voivodeship. Its capital city was Skierniewice.

In 1998, the year it was dissolved, the area of the division measured 3,960 km^2.

== Major cities and towns (population in 1995) ==
- Skierniewice (47,900)
- Żyrardów (43,500)
- Sochaczew (39,700)
- Łowicz (31,500)

== See also ==
- Voivodeships of Poland
