= Przemyśl Voivodeship =

Former administrative division of Poland

Coordinates: 49°47′10″N 22°46′26″E

Przemyśl Voivodeship Województwo przemyskie
- Voivodeship of Poland
- 1975–1998
- Location within Poland
- Capital: Przemyśl
- Area
  - 1998: 4,437 km^{2} (1,713 sq mi)
- Population
  - 1998: 415,600
- History
  - Established: 1975
  - Disestablished: 1998
Succeeded by
Subcarpathian Voivodeship

Przemyśl Voivodeship (Polish: województwo przemyskie) was a unit of administrative division and local government in Poland that existed from 1975 to 1998, superseded by the Podkarpackie Voivodeship. Its capital city was Przemyśl.

== Major cities and towns (population in 1995) ==
- Przemyśl (68,900)
- Jarosław (41,800)

== See also ==
- Voivodeships of Poland
