= Tarnów Voivodeship =

Former administrative division of Poland

Coordinates: 50°00′45″N 20°59′19″E

- Historical division
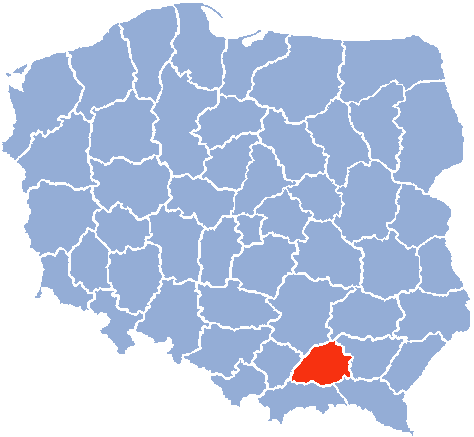
- Tarnów Voivodeship, 1975-1998

Tarnów Voivodeship (Polish: województwo tarnowskie) was a unit of administrative division and local government in Poland in years 1975–1998, superseded by a much larger Lesser Poland Voivodeship. Its capital city was Tarnów. Located in southeastern part of the country, its area was 4,151 km^{2}. (which was 1.3% of the total area of Poland). In 1975 the population was 577,900, in 1998 it grew to 700,800.

- Tarnów (121 494)
- Dębica (49 107)
- Bochnia (29 887)
- Brzesko (17 859)
- Dąbrowa Tarnowska (11 178)

== See also ==
- Voivodeships of Poland
