= Toruń Voivodeship =

Former administrative division of Poland

Coordinates: 53°01′07″N 18°36′06″E

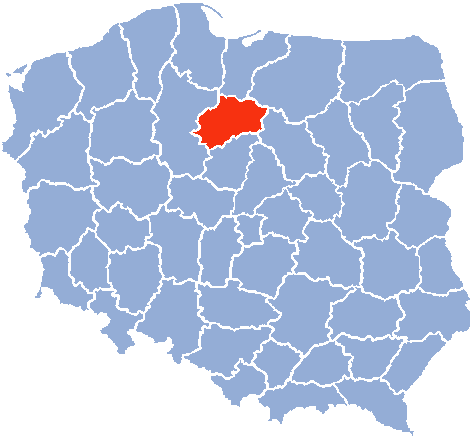
Torun Voivodeship

Toruń Voivodeship (Polish: województwo toruńskie) was a unit of administrative division and local government in Poland from 1975 to 1998, superseded by the Kuyavian-Pomeranian Voivodeship. Its capital city was Toruń, and its first voivode was Jan Przytarski.

Coat of Arms of the Toruń Voivodeship

== Major cities and towns (population in 1995) ==
- Toruń (204,300)
- Grudziądz (102,900)
- Brodnica (27,400)
- Chełmno (22,000)

== See also ==
- Voivodeships of Poland
