= Zdzisław Lubomirski =

Polish aristocrat, landowner and lawyer

Prince Zdzisław Lubomirski
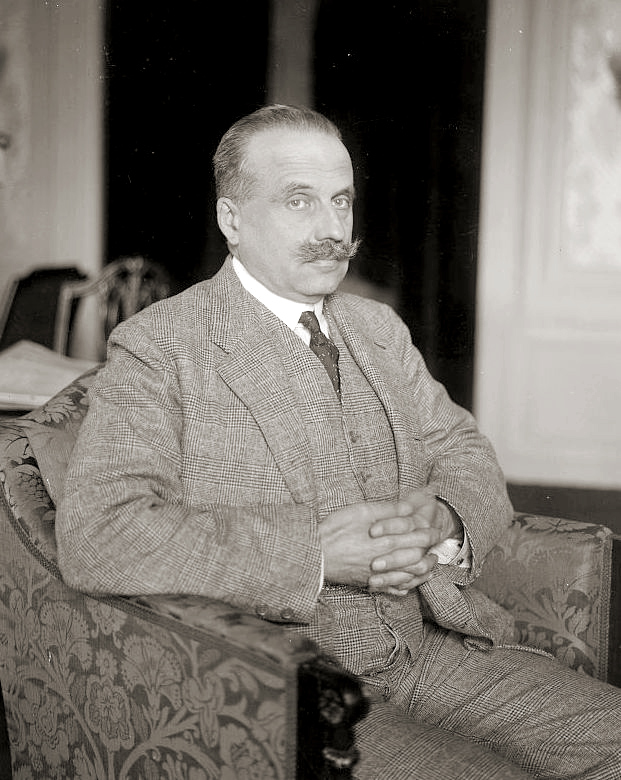
- Lubomirski in 1919

23rd Mayor of Warsaw
- In office August 5, 1916 – October 6, 1917
- Preceded by: Aleksander Miller
- Succeeded by: Piotr Drzewiecki

Personal details
- Born: April 4, 1865 Nizhny Novgorod, Nizhny Novgorod Governorate, Russian Empire
- Died: July 31, 1943 (aged 78) Mała Wieś, Poland
- Occupation: Aristocrat, lawyer, politician

Prince Zdzisław Lubomirski (pronounced [ˈʑd͡ʑiswaf lubɔˈmirskʲi]; 1865–1943) was a Polish aristocrat, landowner, lawyer, a conservative politician and social activist. The Prince was chairman of the "Central Civil Committee" (Centralny Komitet Obywatelski) in 1915. From 1916 to 1917 mayor of Warsaw. He was an activist of the "Real Politics Party" (Stronnictwo Polityki Realnej) and from 1917 to 1918 member of the Regency Council of the new Kingdom of Poland. From 1928 until 1935 member of the Senate and chairman of the "Council of Landowner Organisations" from 1931 to 1935.

In 1893, Lubomirski married Maria née Branicki, with whom he had three children: daughters Julia Maria (born 1894) and Dorota (born 1904), and son Jerzy Aleksander (born 1896). Together with his wife, he lived in a house in Warsaw district of Frascati, and in a family real estate located in the village of Mala Wies, near Grójec.

== Early life and education ==
Zdzislaw Lubomirski was born on April 4, 1865, in the Russian city of Nizhny Novgorod. He was the son of Prince Jan Tadeusz Lubomirski, and Maria née Zamoyska. Since his patriotic parents wanted their son to be raised in a Polish spirit, as a child he was sent to Austrian Galicia, where he attended Kraków's St. Anna High School. In 1883–1887, Lubomirski studied law at Jagiellonian University and University of Graz.

== Career ==
In the early 20th century, Lubomirski became a well-known public figure in partitioned Poland, due to his charity work. In 1904, he became a deputy chairman of Warsaw Association of Charity, and a curator of the Ophthalmic Institute, which provided free eye exams for the poor. Since official education in Russian-controlled Congress Poland was carried out in the Russian language, Lubomirski helped with founding Polish language schools and libraries. He co-founded administrative and organizational foundations of the future Polish education system. He co-created an organization called Spojnia Narodowa (National Unity; 1905), and participated in meetings of teachers – members of Association of National Education.

=== World War I ===
During World War I, the prince continued his charity activities. Among others, he was chairman of such bodies, as Committee of Support of Social Work, Polish Sanitary Help Committee, and Temporary Self-Help of Landowners. On August 3, 1914, Lubomirski became a member of Civic Committee of the City of Warsaw. Since Russian oversight of this body was almost non-existent, the Civic Committee enjoyed wide autonomy. His activities were highly praised by residents of Warsaw. In August 1915, during the Great Retreat, the armies of the German Empire entered Warsaw. Lubomirski refused to leave the city, and with permission of German authorities, he was named chairman of the Central Civil Committee. Under his leadership, a network of Polish language schools was created, and Lubomirski served as a mediator between Polish residents and German government (the committee was later renamed into Central Welfare Council). In order to win maximum autonomy for Poland, Lubomirski cooperated with the Germans. At the same time, he tried to democratize political life of the country. On July 16, 1916, with permission of German authorities, elections for Warsaw local government took place, after which Lubomirski became the mayor of the city. On December 13, 1916, Lubomirski for the first time met with Józef Piłsudski, offering him a post in the future Polish government.

On November 5, 1916, the emperors of Germany and Austria-Hungary issued the so-called Act of 5th November, in which they promised an independent Polish state (see also Kingdom of Poland (1916–18)). A year later, on September 16, 1917, the Germans created a provisional government of Poland, the Regency Council, led by Prince Lubomirski, one of its three members along with Archbishop Aleksander Kakowski, and Józef Ostrowski. The council had its first meeting at Warsaw's Royal Castle on October 27, 1917.

=== Political life ===
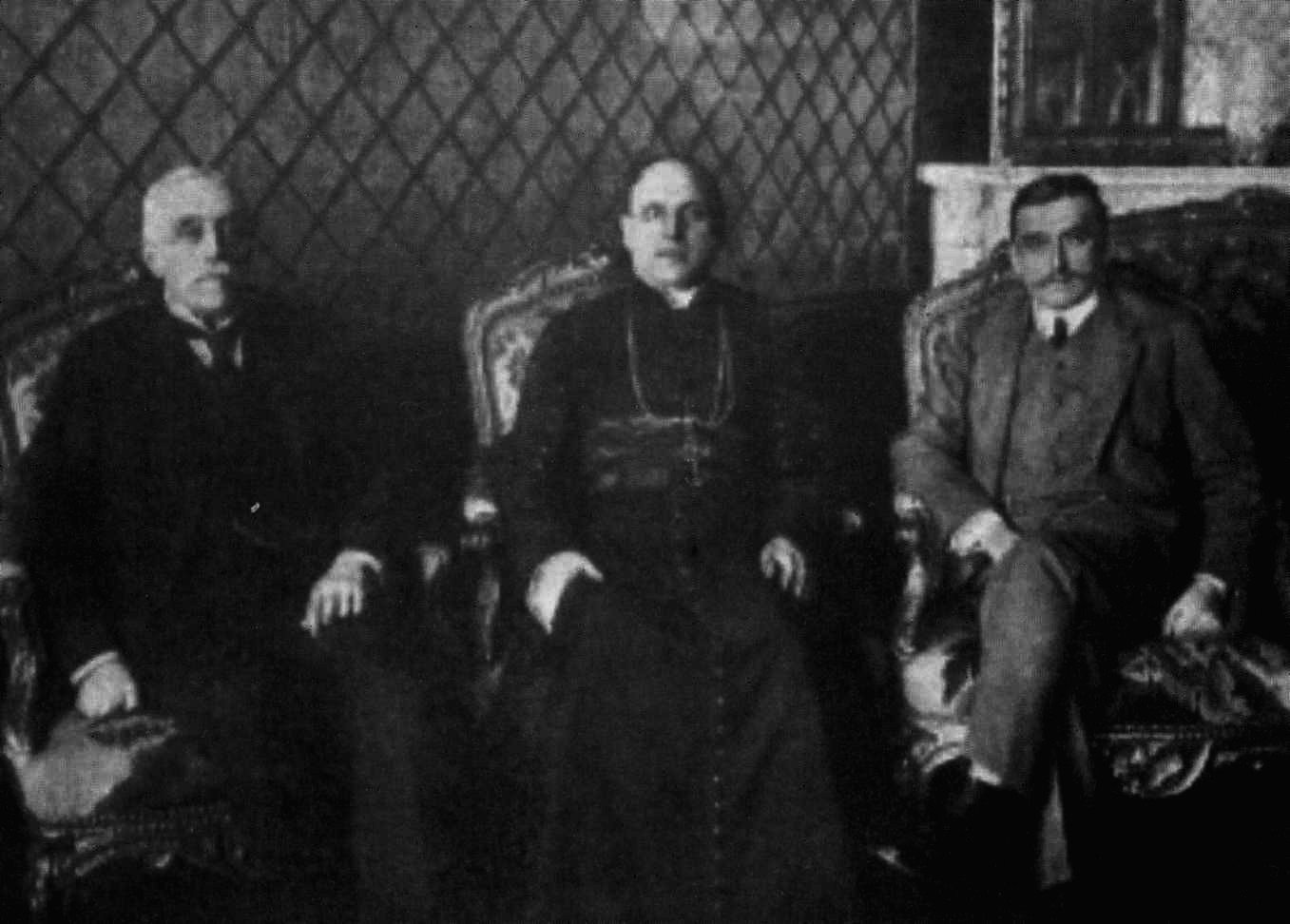
The Regency Council. Left to right: Ostrowski, Kakowski, and Lubomirski.

On October 7, 1918, on initiative of Prince Lubomirski, Polish declaration of independence was announced. Seven days later, the first Polish Army soldiers pledged allegiance to the Polish flag. Lubomirski himself regarded Józef Piłsudski as an excellent politician and statesman, and supported Pilsudski's nomination for the post of the head of state (see Naczelnik Panstwa). On November 10, 1918, Lubomirski welcomed Pilsudski at Warsaw's Rail Station, and four days later, Pilsudski became the Polish head of state.

In the early 1920s Lubomirski stayed away from political life. He decided to return to politics after the May Coup. On May 13, 1926, he talked with Piłsudski at Warsaw East Rail Station. Soon afterwards, he was among four men considered for the post of President of Poland, but refused to accept the nomination. In 1928–1935, Lubomirski was a senator of the Nonpartisan Bloc for Cooperation with the Government, and a chairman of two Senate commissions – foreign affairs and military. He frequently participated in different international events, such as 1929 funeral of Marshal Ferdinand Foch.

In 1930, Lubomirski resigned from the Senate in protest against the Brest trials, but Prime Minister Walery Sławek did not accept the resignation. Lubomirski disliked the so-called colonels’ regime, and in the late 1930s, he organized several secret meetings in which the political situation of the Second Polish Republic was discussed. The sanacja government was aware of this, and blocked Lubomirski's run for Senate election in 1938. Meanwhile, Lubomirski continued his charity activities as a member of several civic organizations.

== Invasion of Poland and death ==
In September 1939, during the Siege of Warsaw, Lubomirski actively participated in the Civic Committee, headed by Stefan Starzynski. In the early months of German occupation of Poland, he worked on creating an underground government under General Juliusz Rómmel, in which he was to be foreign minister. It was never created, as Polish leaders decided to open the government-in-exile, first in Paris and since summer 1940, in London. Lubomirski decided to stay in occupied Poland. On November 10, 1942, he was arrested by the Gestapo, and spent two months in prison. During this time, his health deteriorated, and he never recovered. Lubomirski died on July 31, 1943, in his real estate in Mała Wieś near Grójec. He was buried in a parish church at Bielsko Duże.
