= Ignacy Wyssogota Zakrzewski =

Polish nobleman, politician and art collector (1745-1802)

Ignacy Wyssogota Zakrzewski Mayor of Warsaw
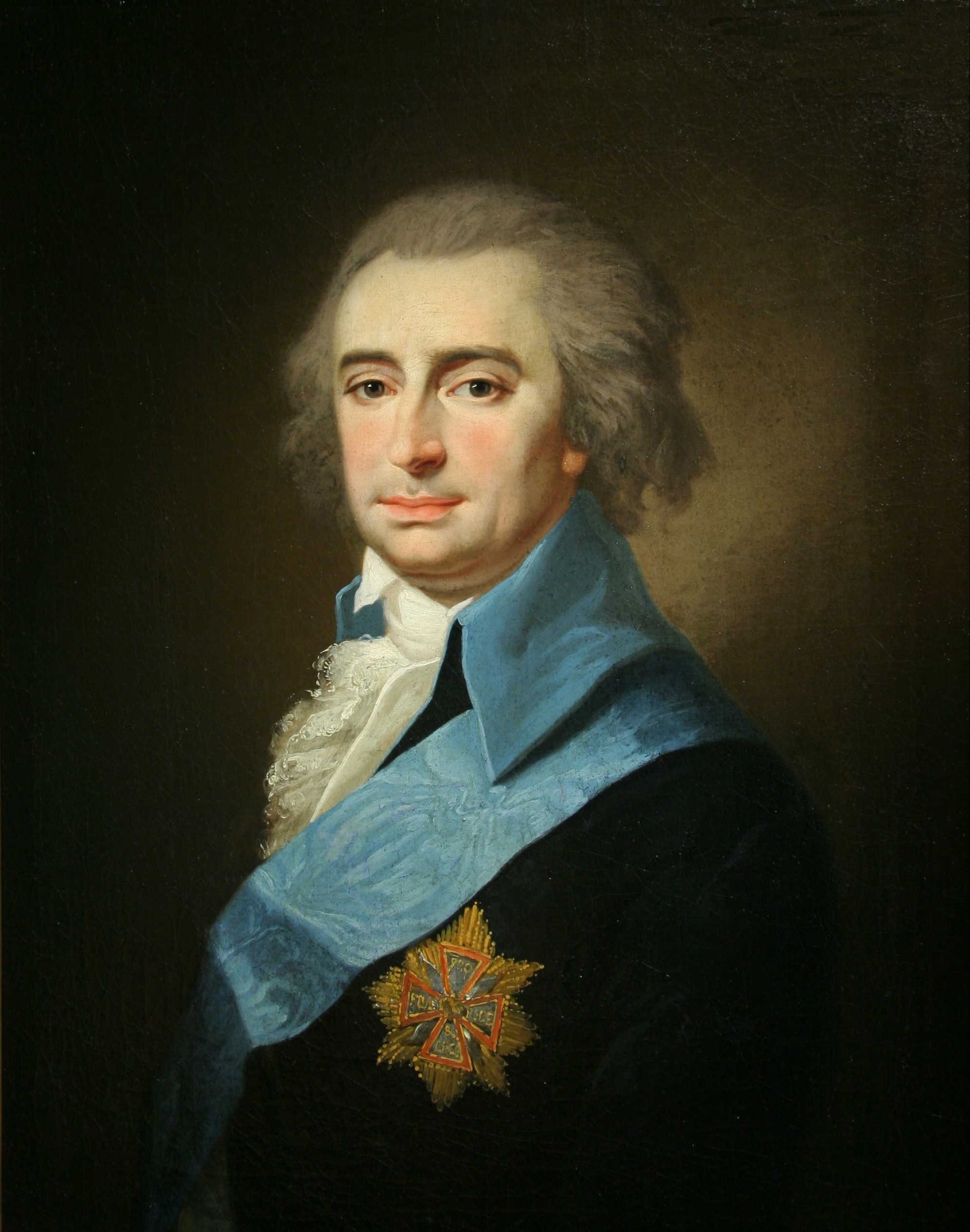
- Portrait by Józef Peszka

1st and 4th Mayor of Warsaw
- In office 16 April 1792 – 18 May 1792
- Monarch: Stanisław II August
- Preceded by: Józef Michał Łukasiewicz
- Succeeded by: Józef Michał Łukasiewicz
- In office 17 April 1794 – 3 November 1794
- Preceded by: Andrzej Rafałowicz
- Succeeded by: Józef Michał Łukasiewicz

Personal details
- Born: 1745 Stary Białcz, Poland
- Died: 15 February 1802 (aged 56–57) Żelechów, Partitioned Poland
- Profession: Politician, Freemason

Ignacy Wyssogota Zakrzewski (1745–1802) was a notable Polish nobleman, politician, art collector, Freemason, and the Mayor of Warsaw during the last years of the Polish–Lithuanian Commonwealth, in 1792 and 1794.

== Biography ==

Ignacy Wyssogota Zakrzewski was born in Stary Białcz (Greater Poland Voivodeship). He was deputy of Poznań for the Great Sejm and one of the co-authors of the reforms of treasury passed by the Sejm during the Constitution of 3 May. In 1791 he co-founded the Society of Friends of the Constitution, and was among the most notable supporters of the reforms passed by that act, along with Hugo Kołłątaj and Ignacy Potocki. In 1792 he became the Mayor of Warsaw, but was overthrown by the confederation of Targowica. After the outbreak of the Kościuszko's Insurrection and the Warsaw Uprising of 1794 he again held that post. Simultaneously, he held a number of important government posts during the war with Russia, among them he headed the Provisional Temporary Council and the Supreme National Council. After that part of Poland, along with Warsaw, was finally annexed in the effect of the Third Partition, he was arrested by the Russians and imprisoned in St. Petersburg. Released from prison in 1796, he returned to Poland and spent the remainder of his life in a small manor in Żelechów. He died on 15 February 1802.

=== Remembrance ===
Ignacy Wyssogota Zakrzewski is one of the characters immortalized in Jan Matejko's 1891 painting, Constitution of 3 May 1791.

== Sources ==
- "Zakrzewski Ignacy". Internetowa encyklopedia PWN (in Polish). Archived from the original on 2012-02-18.
