= Wyssogota coat of arms =

Polish coat of arms

Wyssogota
- Alternative names: Wyskota, Wyszogota
- Earliest mention: 1411
- Towns: none
- Families: Bendorski, Będorski, Brenert, Dzieciartowski, Goliński, Kawiecki, Poduchowski, Wyskota, Wyszkota, Zakrzewski

Wyssogota is a Polish coat of arms. It was used by several szlachta families in the times of the Kingdom of Poland and the Polish–Lithuanian Commonwealth.

== Notable bearers ==
Notable bearers of this coat of arms include:

- Ignacy Wyssogota Zakrzewski (1745–1805), Polish politician, MP and president of Warsaw in the times of Kościuszko's Uprising

== Bibliography ==
- Andrzej Kulikowski: Wielki herbarz rodów polskich. Warszawa: Świat Książki, 2005, ISBN 83-7391-523-0.

== See also ==
- Polish heraldry
- Heraldry
- Coat of arms
