= Zygmunt Wielopolski =

Polish politician (1833–1902)

Margrave Zygmunt Wielopolski
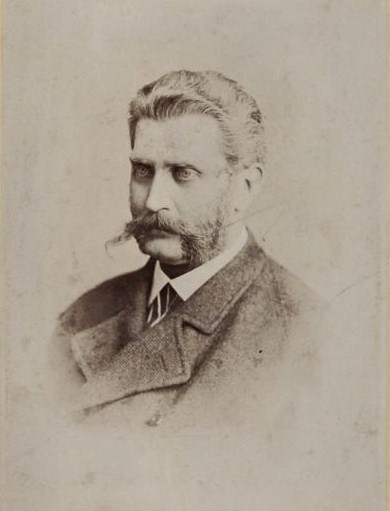

President of Warsaw
- In office 16 August 1862 – 18 September 1863
- Preceded by: Kazimierz Woyda
- Succeeded by: Kalikst Witkowski

Personal details
- Born: 30 January 1833, Kraków, Free City of Kraków
- Died: 27 February 1902, Berlin, German Empire
- Spouse(s): Albertyna Leopoldyna Wilhelmina Montenuovo; Elżbieta Niezabitowska
- Children: Aleksander Erwin Wielopolski; Małgorzata Maria; Maria Anna Paulina; Alfred Wielopolski; Albert Krzysztof Wielopolski
- Parent(s): Alexander Wielopolski; Paulina Apolonia Potocka
- Awards: Imperial Order of Saint Alexander Nevsky Order of the Iron Crown 1st Class Grand Cross of the Imperial Order of Franz Joseph
- Noble family: Wielopolski

Margrave (Polish: margrabia) Zygmunt Andrzej Wielopolski (30 January 1833 in Krakow – 27 February 1902 in Berlin) was the President of Warsaw from 1862 to 1863, during the time when Warsaw was part of Congress Poland.

== Biography ==
Wielopolski was born in Kraków and when he grew up he entered the tsarist army in 1852 in which he joined a regiment of lancers stationed in the Lublin region and took part in the Crimean War.

Wielopolski was the son of the Margrave Aleksander Wielopolski and the nephew of Zygmunt Wielopolski (1863–1919), who was vice president of the National Polish Committee in 1914.

Wielopolski was a conservative who supported the policies of Tsar Nicholas II and viewed the tsar as an ally in suppressing radicalism. He attempted a reconciliation with Russia on the grounds of Slavic solidarity.

Wielopolski was known to be a member of the Polish Agricultural Society of the Congress Kingdom of Poland in 1858 which aimed to gain more from Polish land and represent landowners. This organisation was later suppressed through the efforts of his father Aleksander Wielopolski.

== Personal life ==
Wielopolski's father Aleksander Wielopolski was a major political figure in Congress Poland who led the Civil Government while his mother Paulina Apolonia Potocka came from the famous Potocki family.

Wielopolski married Albertyna Montenuovo who was the daughter of William Albert, 1st Prince of Montenuovo and thus was directly related to the Habsburg family which were the rulers of Austria.

== Honours ==
On 12 November 1879 Wielopolski was confirmed as an Imperial Count in the Holy Roman Empire and Margrave in the Russian Empire, in 1870 he received the Grand Cross of the Order of Franz Joseph, in 1884 he also received the Austrian Order of the Iron Crown, 1st class and in 1890 the Russian Order of Saint Alexander Nevsky with diamonds.
