= Black Procession =

1789 demonstration in Warsaw, Poland–Lithuania

This is an article about a historical event in Poland. For a musical band, see The Black Heart Procession.

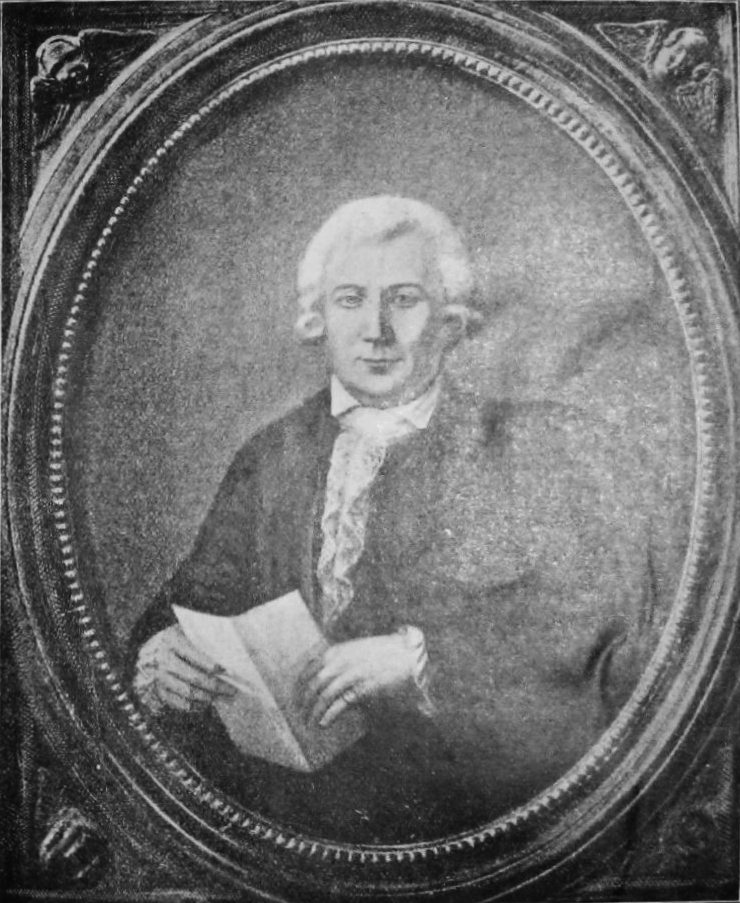
Jan Dekert, president of Warsaw and leader of the Black Procession

Black procession (Polish: Czarna procesja) was a demonstration held by burghers of Polish royal cities in Polish–Lithuanian Commonwealth's capital of Warsaw on 2 December 1789, during the Great Sejm. It vastly contributed to the passage of a belated major urban reform.

The procession that took place Warsaw on 2 December 1789 was inspired by Hugo Kołłątaj, and led by Jan Dekert. 294 representatives of 141 towns under royal charter (miasta królewskie), clad in black, passed peacefully (marching or in carriages) through the streets of Warsaw, from the town hall, reaching the Royal Castle (where members of the Great Sejm were meeting) and getting an audience with the king Stanisław August Poniatowski. The burghers demanded similar privileges to those held by the nobles (szlachta). Their demands included the right to buy and own land estates, the right to be represented in the Polish parliament (Sejm) and reforms to the urban law. The procession influenced the Great Sejm to create a Commission for the Cities (Deputacja w sprawie miast).

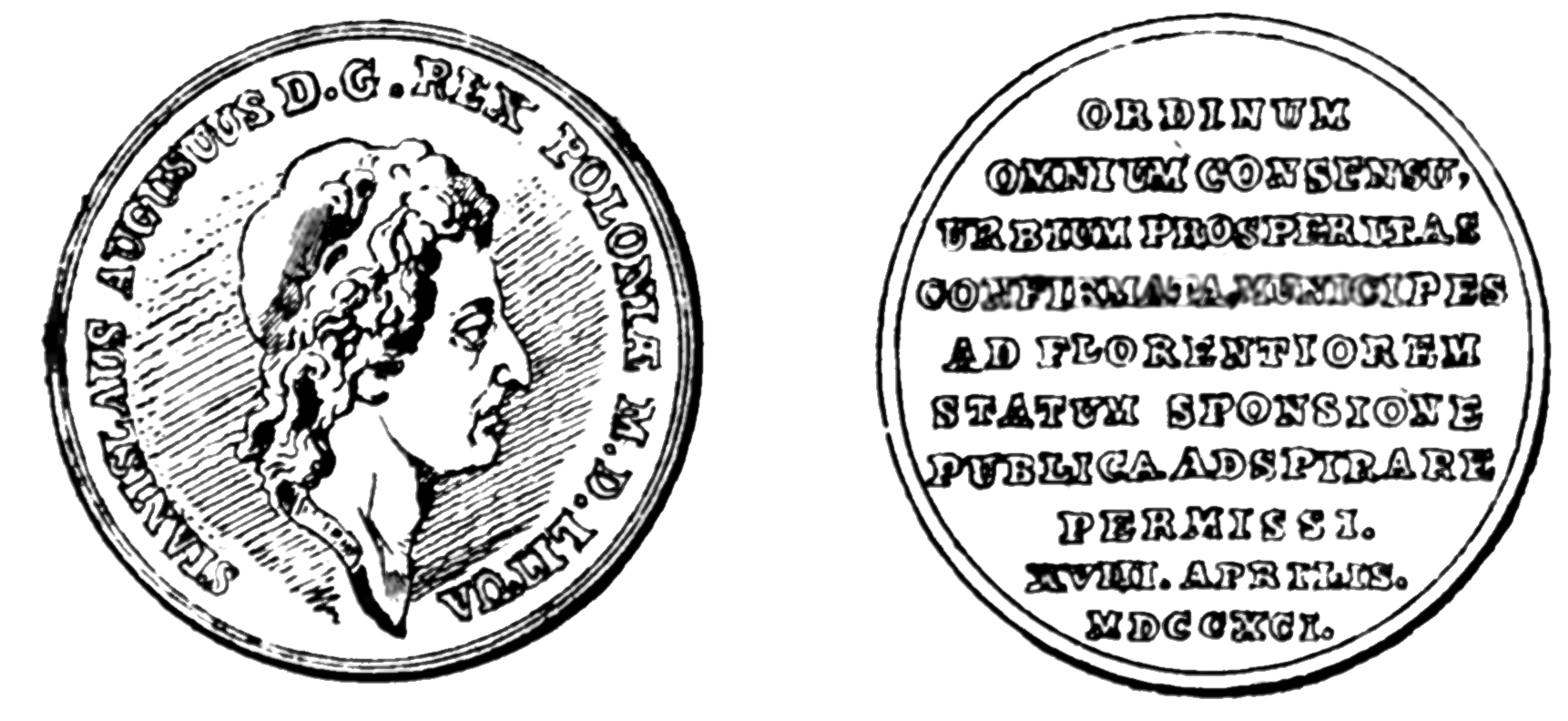
Medal commemorating Free Royal Cities Act 1791

Only members of the royal towns (with the notable exception of Kraków) took part in the procession; the representatives of the private towns (owned by the magnates) did not.

Eventually, the burghers' cause succeeded and the belated urban reform in the Commonwealth took place with the passage of the Free Royal Cities Act on 18 April 1791, which became a notable amendment to the Constitution of 3 May. The Act granted, to the Commonwealth's townspeople, personal security, the right to acquire landed property, and eligibility for military officers' commissions, public offices, and gave the right for ennoblement.
