= Bareja =

BarejaIs a Polish surname of multiple possibe origins. Notable persons with the surname include:

- Mieczysław Bareja
- Stanisław Bareja

== See also ==
- Bareja (village), India
