= Wojdan =

Wojdan is both a given name and a surname. Notable people with the name include:

- Krzysztof Wojdan (born 1968), Polish judoka
- Wojdan Shaherkani (born 1996), Saudi judoka

== See also ==
- Wojda
- Wojdat
