= Wojdat =

Wojdat or Woydat is a surname. Notable people with the surname include:

- Vaidotas (fl. 1360s), son of Kęstutis, Grand Duke of Lithuania
- Artur Wojdat (born 1968), Polish swimmer

== See also ==
- Wojda
- Wojdan
