= Stanisław Wyganowski =

Polish politician and economist (1919–2017)

Mayor of Warsaw
- In office 30 January 1990 – 5 October 1994
- Preceded by: Jerzy Bolesławski
- Succeeded by: Mieczysław Bareja

Voivode of the Warsaw Voivodeship
- In office 30 January 1990 – May 1990
- Preceded by: Jerzy Bolesławski
- Succeeded by: Adam Langer

Personal details
- Born: 7 December 1919 Ligota, Poland
- Died: 13 October 2017 (aged 97) Warsaw, Poland
- Resting place: Józefów, Poland
- Party: Independent
- Spouse: Elżbieta Targowska (m. 1940; died 2001)
- Parents: Stefan Wyganowski; Maria Karnkowska
- Education: SGH Warsaw School of Economics
- Occupation: Politician; Economist; Urban planner

Military service
- Allegiance: Second Polish Republic (until 1939); Polish government-in-exile (1939–1945)
- Branch/service: Polish Armed Forces; Home Army; Polish People's Army
- Years of service: 1939–1945
- Battles/wars: Second World War: Invasion of Poland; Operation Tempest

Stanisław Wyganowski (Polish: [staˈɲi.swaf vɘ̟.ɡaˈnɔf.ski]; 7 December 1919 – 13 October 2017) was a politician, economist and urban planner. From 1990 to 1994, he was the mayor of Warsaw, Poland from 1990 to 1994. Wyganowski was also the voivode of the Warsaw Voivodeship in 1990. Wyganowsk served as an independent politician.

== Biography ==
Stanisław Wyganowski was born on 7 December 1919 in Ligota, a village now located in Łask County in Łódź Voivodeship, Poland. His parents were Stefan Wyganowski and Maria Karnkowska. His father came from noble family from the clan of Łodzia, and was a member of Sejm of Poland from 1935 to 1938. He also had a sister Zofia.

In September 1939, Wyganowski served in the Polish Armed Forces during the German invasion of Poland in the Second World War. Later during the conflict, he also served in the Home Army resistance, took part in the Operation Tempest, and was in the 2nd Warsaw Infantry Division of the Polish People's Army.

Wyganowski graduated from the SGH Warsaw School of Economics with a master's degree in economics. In 1950, he began working in city planning institutions in Warsaw, including for the Institute of Housing Construction, the Institute of Urbanistics and Architecture, the Warsaw South–East Project Bureau, and the Warsaw Voivodeship Urbanistics Workshop. In the early 1970s, he was a director of the Institute of Urbanistics of Architecture. From 1968 to 1972, he was a member of the Spacial Development Comittie, and the Architecture and Urbanistics Committee of the Polish Academy of Sciences. From 1968 to 1973 he was a member of the upper management of the Polish Urbanists Society, and became its chairperson in 1997. From 1974 to 1980 he worked in Algeria, where he was part of the team that designed urbanist plans of Algiers. From 1980, he was a docent in the Institute of Environmental Management.

In the 1980s, he was an activist of the Solidarity trade union. On 30 January 1990, Prime Minister Tadeusz Mazowiecki appointed him as the mayor of Warsaw. Simultaneously, from 30 January 1990 to May 1990, he was also the voivode of the Warsaw Voivodeship, until the title was separated into a separate office. Following the 1990 local elections he was reelected as the mayor, being reappointed on 25 June 1990. Wyganowski was the first mayor of the city to be appointed following the democratic transition from the government of the Polish People's Republic to the Third Polish Republic. As the mayor, he had organized a new city government and planned tasks for the city development in the following years.

While in the office, he was also a chairperson of the International Association of Peace Messenger Cities, and was a Polish delegate to the Congress of Local and Regional Authorities of the Council of Europe, deputy chairperson of the State and Local Government Commission of the Office of the Council of Ministers, and the co-founder and chairporson of the Polish Metropoleis Union. In 1993, he had published a book Jutro wielka Warszawa (lit. 'Tomorrow Grand Warsaw'). He was in the office until 5 October 1994.

During 1993 parliamentary election, he had unsuccessfully run to become a member of the Senate of Poland, as a candidate of the Nonpartisan Bloc for Support of Reforms.

In 2014, he had endorsed Hanna Gronkiewicz-Waltz in her re-election campaign for the mayor of Warsaw. He was also a member of the Committee of the Support for the POLIN Museum of the History of Polish Jews in Warsaw.

Wyganowski died on 13 October 2017 in Warsaw, and was buried at a cemetery in Józefów.

== Private life ==
From 1940, he was married to Elżbieta Targowska (1918–2001). Together they had three children.

== Published works ==
- Jutro wielka Warszawa (1993, Związek Dzielnic-Gmin Warszawy)

== Awards and decorations ==
- Commander's Cross with Star of the Order of Polonia Restituta (2015)
- Commander's Cross of the Order of Polonia Restituta (1994)
- Gold Cross of Merit
- Medal of the 10th Anniversary of People's Poland (1955)
- Medal for Long Marital Life (1995)
- Cross of the Home Army
- Titile of the Honorary Citizen of Warsaw (2012)
