= Wiktor Litwiński =

President of Warsaw

Wiktor Litwiński was the President of Warsaw from July 1906 to 26 April 1909. In 1910 he was put on trial in St. Petersburg for alleged abuses during his time as mayor.
