= Bohdan Jastrzębski =

Polish urbanist and politician (1929–2020)

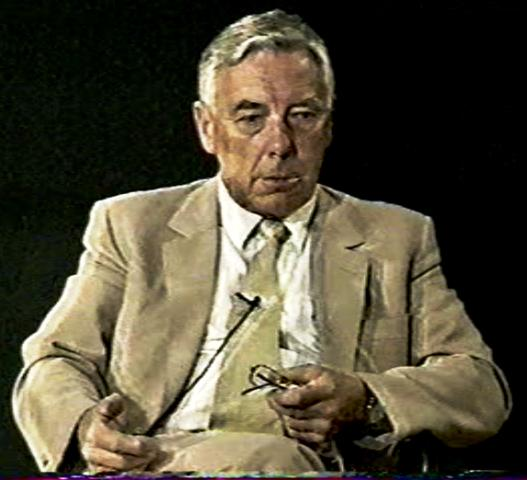
- Jastrzębski in 1993.

Voivode of the Warsaw Voivodeship
- In office 15 October 1990 – 28 November 1997
- Preceded by: Adam Langer
- Succeeded by: Maciej Gielecki

Member of the Warsaw Local Government Assembly
- In office 6 June 1990 – 15 October 1990

Member of the Warsaw-Żoliborz Municipal Council
- In office 6 June 1990 – 15 October 1990

Member of the Żoliborz District Council
- In office 1988 – 1 April 1990

Personal details
- Born: 29 September 1929 Kielce, Poland
- Died: 11 July 2000 (aged 70) Warsaw, Poland
- Resting place: Powązki Cemetery, Warsaw, Poland
- Party: Independent
- Education: Warsaw University of Technology

Bohdan Michał Jastrzębski (Polish: [ˈbɔɣ.dan ˈmi.xaw jasˈtʂɛmp.ski]; 29 September 1929 – 11 July 2000) was a Polish urbanist and politician. He served as the voivode of the Warsaw Voivodeship from 15 October 1990 to 28 November 1997. From 1988 to 1990, he was also a councilor in Żoliborz, one of the districts of the city of Warsaw, and later also a councilor in the municipality of Warsaw-Żoliborz in 1990, which replaced the aforementioned district. He was also a member of the Warsaw Local Government Assembly, a legislative branch of the Warsaw Voivodeship, serving from 6 June 1990 to 15 October 1990, as one of the representatives of the municipality of Warsaw-Żoliborz.

== Biography ==
Bohdan Jastrzębski was born on 29 September 1929 in Kielce, Poland. He was a son of Jadwiga Stefanowska, and Jan Jastrzębski, a major in the Polish Armed Forces, and a mayor of Lubartów. In 1942, he moved to Warsaw. Jastrzębski graduated from the Warsaw University of Technology. For many years, he worked as urbanist in Poland and abroad. From 1988 to 1 April 1990, Jastrzębski was a councilor in Żoliborz, one of the districts of the city of Warsaw, and from 6 Jun 1990 to 15 October 1990, he was a councilor in the municipality of Warsaw-Żoliborz, one of the subdivisions in the city, which replaced the district. He was also a member of the Warsaw Local Government Assembly, a legislative branch of the Warsaw Voivodeship, serving from 6 June 1990 to 15 October 1990, as one of the representatives of the municipality of Warsaw-Żoliborz. From 15 October 1990 to 28 November 1997, he served as the voivode of the Warsaw Voivodeship. He was an independent politician. In 1993, he was awarded with the Józef Tuliszkowski Honorary Medal. Jastrzębski died on 11 July 2000 in Warsaw, at the age of 70, and was buried at the Powązki Cemetery.

== Awards and decorations ==
- Józef Tuliszkowski Honorary Medal (1993)
