= Mała Wieś Palace =

- Pałac w Małej Wsi
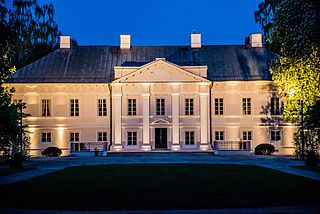
- The view from the garden side

- Location within Poland Location within Masovian Voivodeship

General information
- Type: Palace
- Architectural style: Neoclassicism
- Location: Mała Wieś, Grójec county, Poland, Poland
- Coordinates: 51°49′34″N 20°46′19″E
- Construction started: 1783
- Completed: 1786
- Inaugurated: June 3rd, 1786
- Client: Bazyli Walicki

Design and construction
- Architect: Hilary Szpilowski

Website
- www.palacmalawies.pl

Mała Wieś Palace is a neoclassical palace in Mała Wieś, Mazovian Voivodeship, Poland.

The Polish nobleman Bazyli Walicki originally built a manor on the Mała Wieś site. It was designed by Hilary Szpilowski. Since 1786 to 1945 Palace used to belong to families Walickis, Zamoyskis, Lubomirskis and Morawskis. After the Second World War it was nationalized and became the summer residence of the Polish prime ministers.

Nowadays it is a multifunctional place with hotel, restaurant and reception hall.

== History ==
Since the 17th century, this land was the property of the szlachta family of Zbierzchowskis. They owned Belsk Duży and few of the neighbour villages. This land was acquired in the middle of the 18th century by the close ally and economic council of the last king of Poland, Stanisław August Poniatowski. Bazyli Walicki, the son of Aleksander and Pudencianna of the Czosnkowski family became the owner of Mała Wieś. He married Rose of the Nieborskis and he invested money from the dowry in creating a new manor.

The family moved in 1786 to this beautiful, classical palace designed by Polish architect Hilary Szpilowski. The palace was visited by the last Polish king in 1791, when S.A. Poniatowski stopped by after returning from the meeting with Catherine the Great. This visit is memorized by the stone in Mała Wieś park.

== Gardens ==
The garden of Mala Wies used to be of three parts. The French one laid on the axis of the Palace, the English one and the fruitful one, where first apple trees in Grójec county were planted, which are nowadays the main part of the region's landscape.

== Nowadays ==
After the renovation held in 2013-2016, the palace was adapted for services purposes. In the place of the old socrealistic reception hall from the 1960s was created multifunctional building - the New Orangery - building similar to many greenhouses built by the Polish aristocracy in the 18th century. The interiors of the building are ornamented with the frescoes similar to the ones in the Palace's Pompeian Hall. The four outhouses, which used to serve for the servants of the mansion as a laundry, kitchen or pantry where adapted to hotel rooms, and Carriage House was recreated to restaurant. The order of the French garden was recreated on the base of the Klementyna Kozietulska's garden. Its most famous part is the rose garden with more than 3000 bushes of this flowers.

== Gallery ==
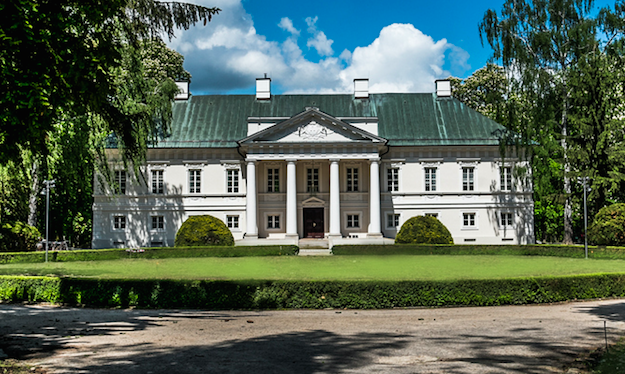
Front view of the palace

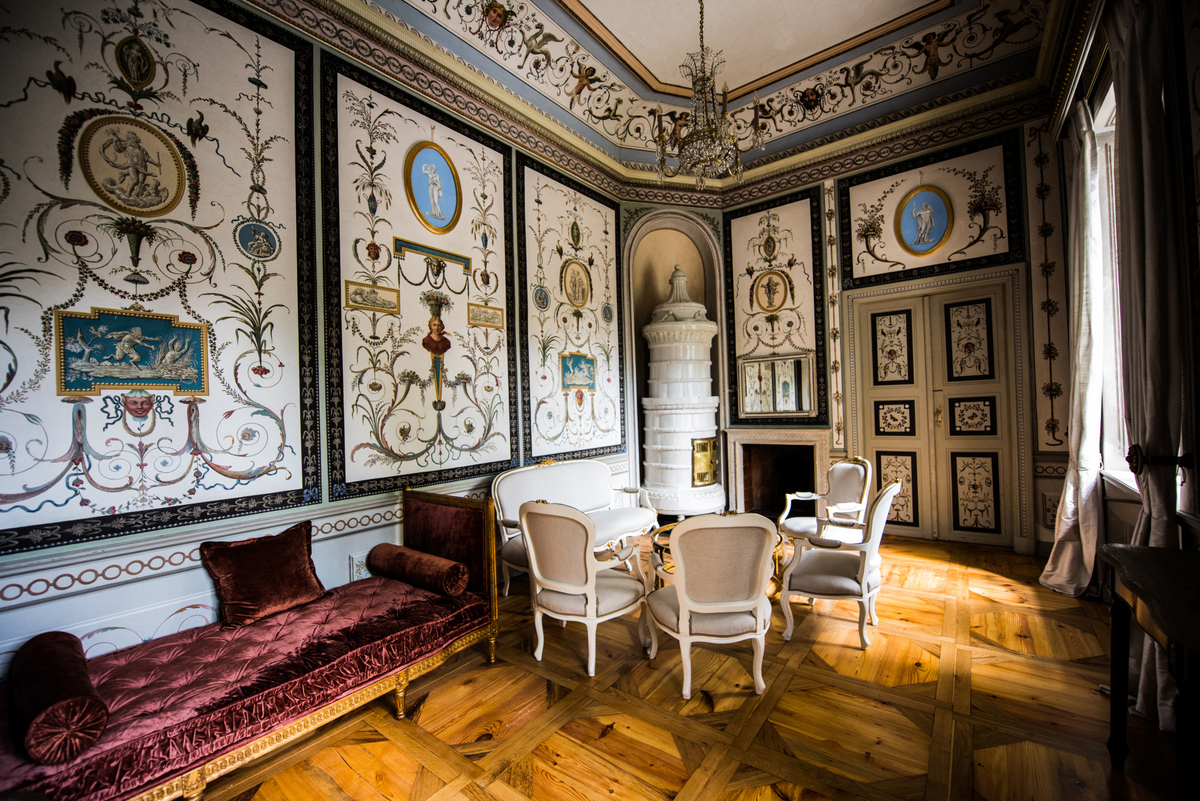
Pompeii Hall

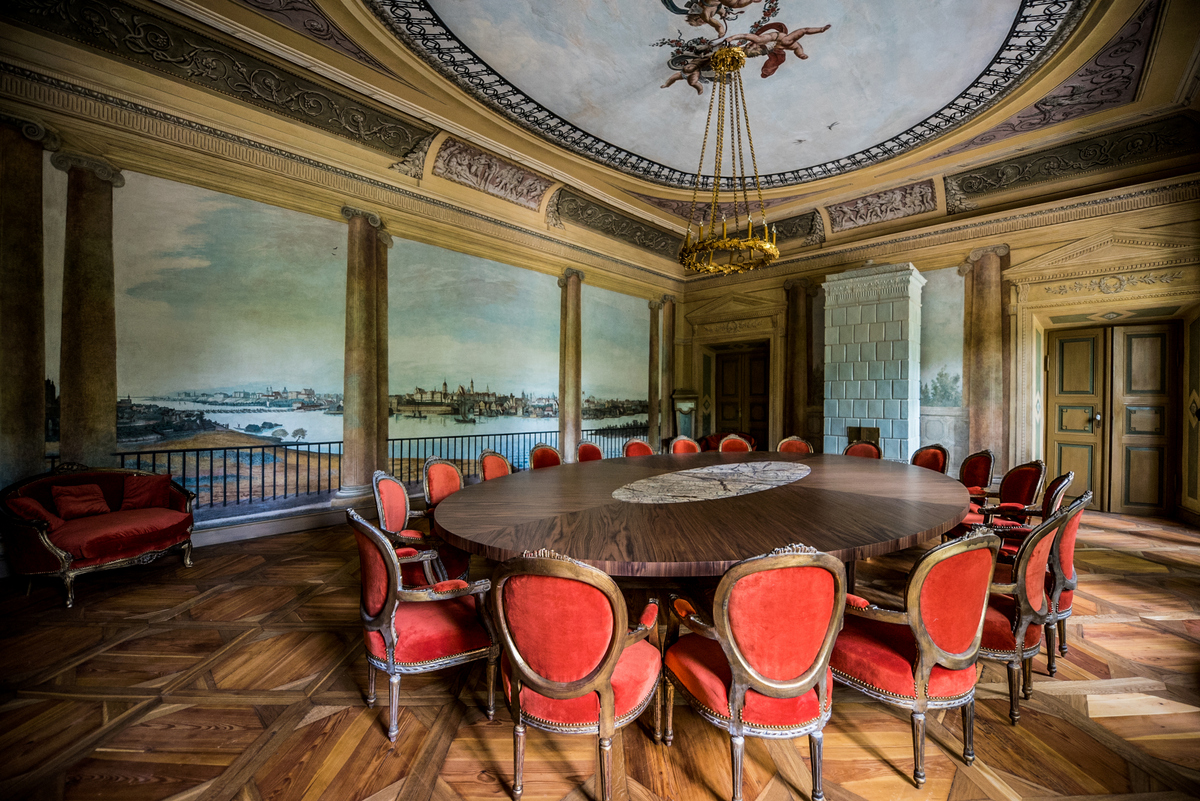
Varsovian Hall

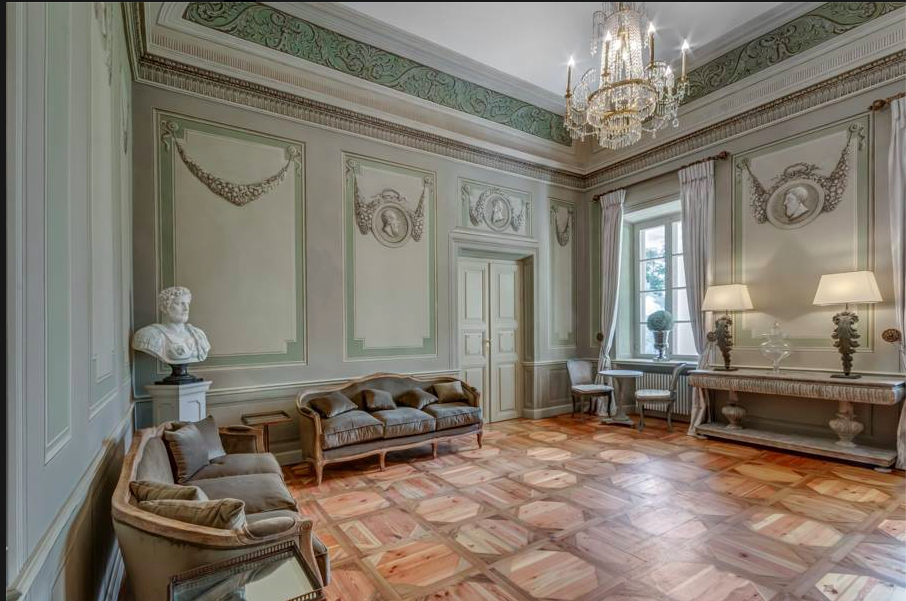
Philosophers' Hall

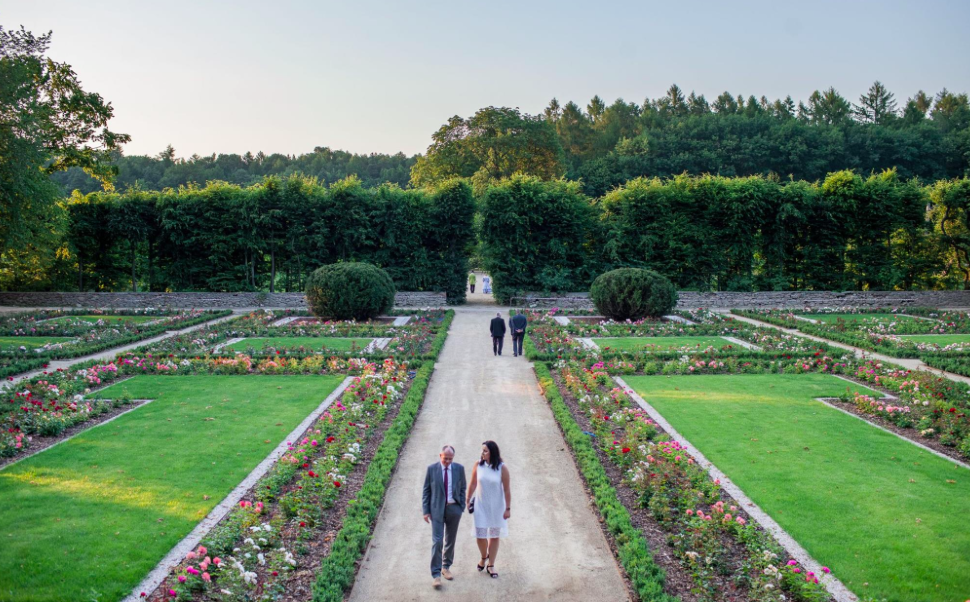
Rose garden in Mala Wies Palace

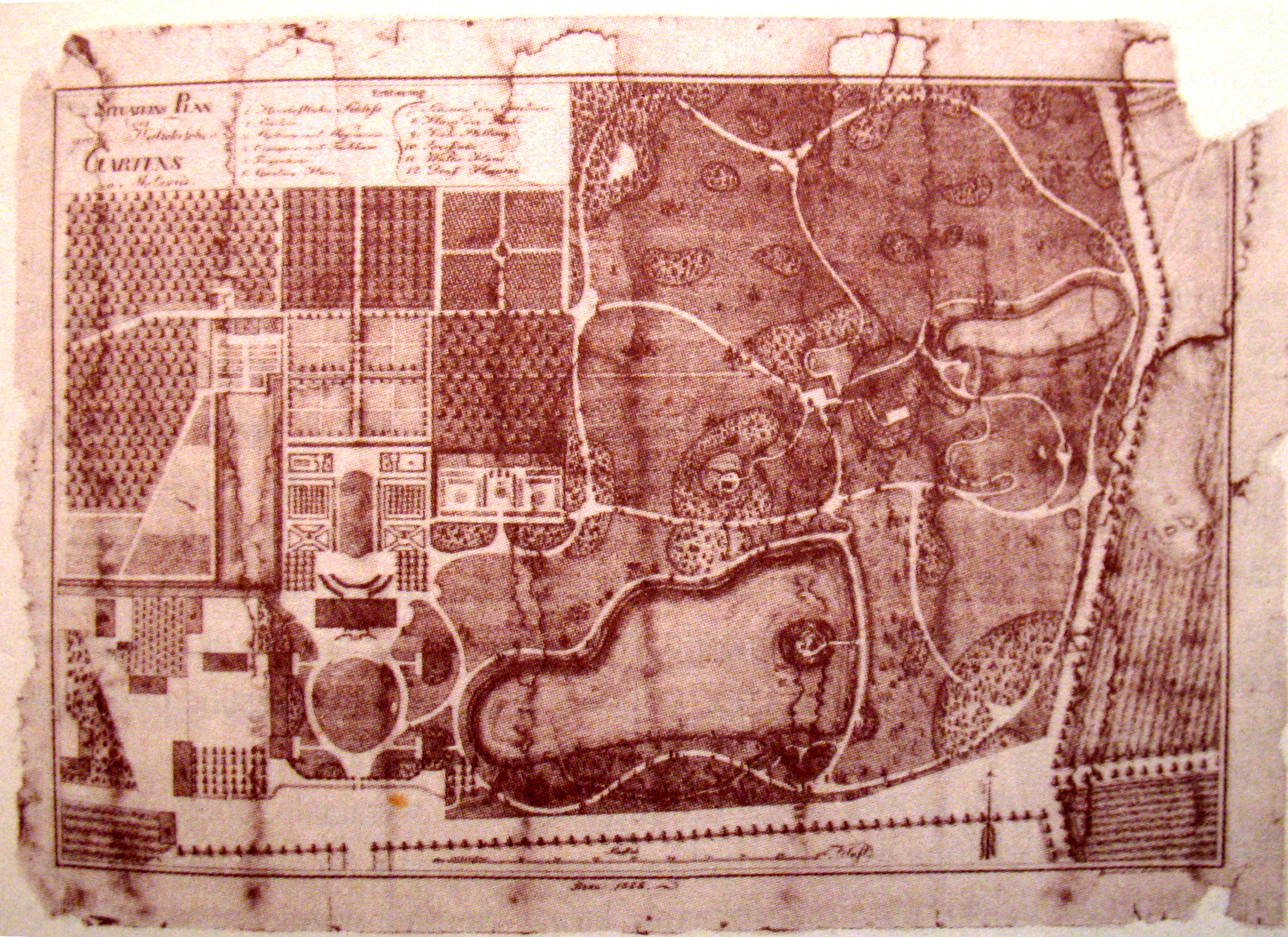
The garden's project, 1829

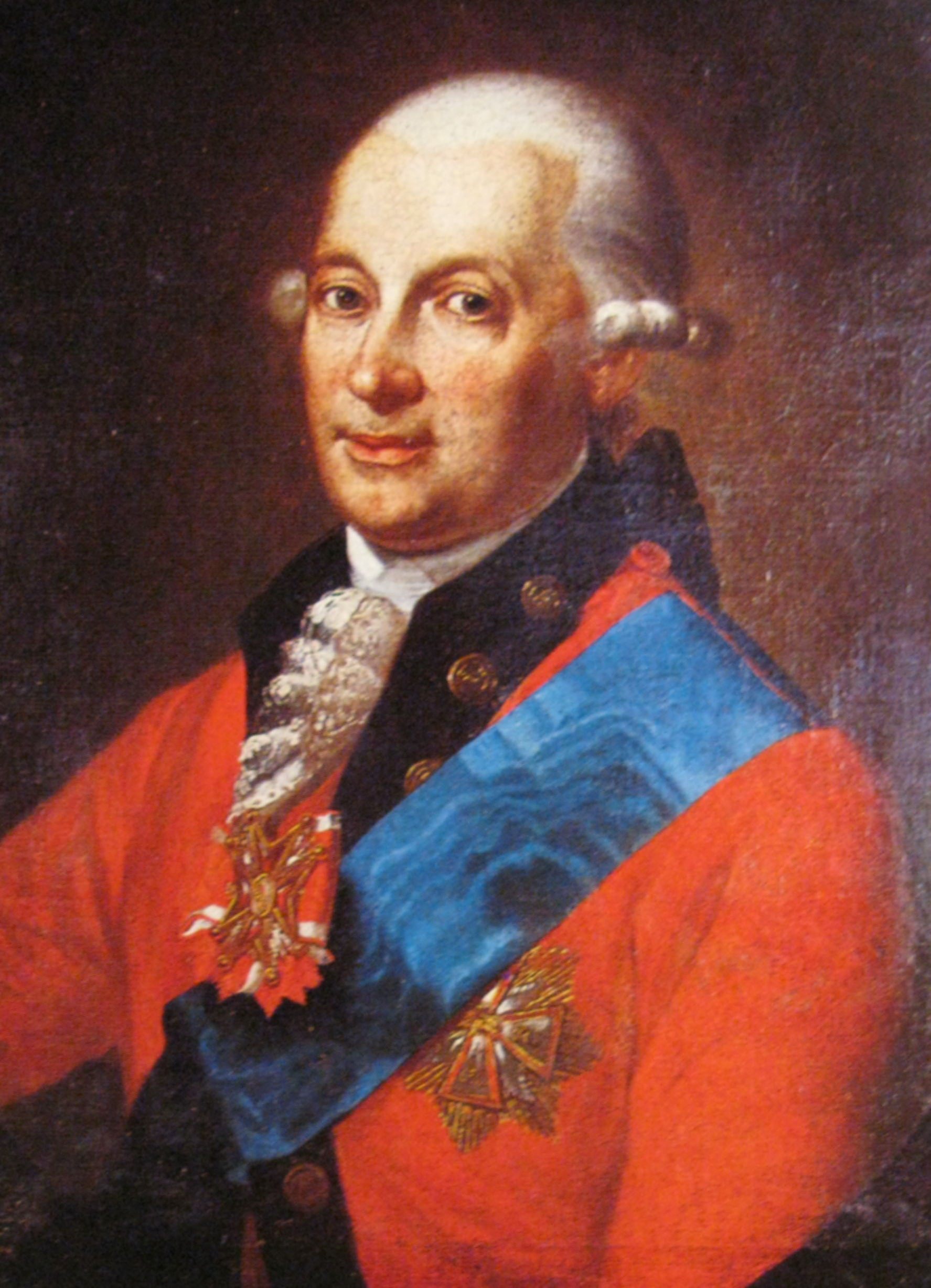
Bazyli Walicki, founder of the palace

== See also ==
- Neoclassical architecture
- Neoclassical architecture in Poland

== Bibliography ==
- Zdzisław Morawski, Gdzie ten dom, gdzie ten świat, Warszawa 1997, 8371630484, ISBN 9788371630484
- Maria Lubomirska, Pamiętnik księżnej Marii Zdzisławowej Lubomirskiej 1914-1918, Poznań 2002, ISBN 8386138920
- Andrzej Zygmunt Rola-Stężycki, Waliccy z Walisk herbu Łada z linii małowiejskiej ( i nie tylko ), na tle rodzin skoligaconych i ich związki z grójecczyzną., Instytut Genealogii
- Andrzej Zygmunt Rola-Stężycki, Duch wojewody, Instytut Genealogii
- Andrzej Zygmunt Rola-Stężycki, Zaradny wojewoda, Instytut Genealogii
- Mikołaj Getka-Kenig, Trzy pałace Hilarego Szpilowskiego: klasycyzm, a problem elitarności wśród szlachty na Mazowszu końca XIll wieku, Biuletyn Historii Sztuki, 2015
- Aleksandra Bernatowicz, Niepodobne do rzeczywistości. Malowana groteska w rezydencjach Warszawy i Mazowsza 1777-1820, Warszawa 2006, ISBN 9788389101488
