= Provisional Council of the Duchy of Masovia =

Interim government in Poland

The Provisional Council of the Duchy of Masovia (Polish: Rada Zastępcza Tymczasowa Księstwa Mazowieckiego) was a government ad interim of Warsaw and the Masovian Voivodeship, liberated in the Warsaw Insurrection during the Kościuszko Uprising. It was headed by Ignacy Wyssogota Zakrzewski, president of Warsaw.

It operated between 19 April and 27 May 1794, when it was subordinated to the Supreme National Council.

The Council comprised four sections, each headed by a counselor:

- Diplomatic Section
- Police Section
- Treasury Section
- Military Section

== Bibliography ==
- Protokóły i dzienniki Rady Zastępczej Tymczasowej i Rady Najwyższej Narodowej, Kraków, 1918.
