= Nikolai Bibikov =

Russian general (1842–1923)

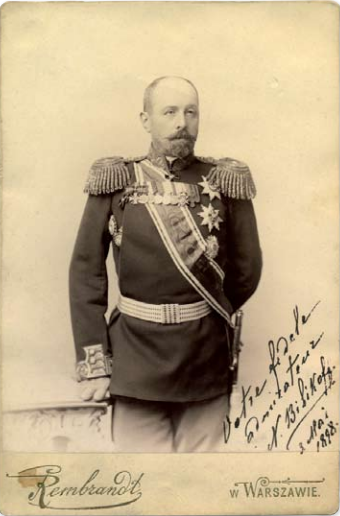
Nikolai Bibikov

Nikolai Valerianovich Bibikov (Russian: Никола́й Валериа́нович Би́биков; 9 August 1842 – 21 February 1923) was a general in the Imperial Russian Army.

Bibikov was the son of Major General Valerian Aleksandrovich Bibikov. After graduating from the Nicholas Cavalry School he served in Lancer Guard regiment. In 1888–1890 he was ADC to the commander of the Warsaw military district Joseph Gurko.

From 1892 to 1906 he was the President of Warsaw. In 1906 he stepped down from the post after being promoted to the rank of general.
