= Władysław Jabłoński =

Polish politician and architect

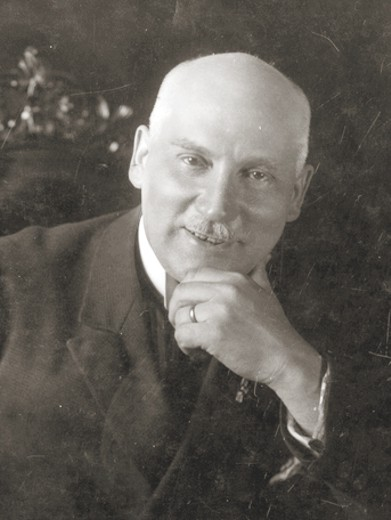
- Władysław Jabłoński, photography made before 1926.

Mayor of Warsaw
- In office 2 October 1922 – 21 September 1927
- Preceded by: Stanisław Nowodworski
- Succeeded by: Zygmunt Słomiński

Personal details
- Born: 2 October 1872 Warsaw, Congress Poland, Russian Empire (now part of Poland)
- Died: 21 September 1952 (aged 79) Warsaw, Poland
- Resting place: Powązki Cemetery, Warsaw, Poland
- Education: Vienna University of Technology
- Occupation: Architect; politician

Władysław Jabłoński (Polish: [vwaˈdɘ̟.swaf jaˈbwɔɲ.ski]; 2 October 1872 – 21 September 1952) was an architect and government official. From 1922 to 1927 he was the mayor of Warsaw, Poland.

== Biography ==
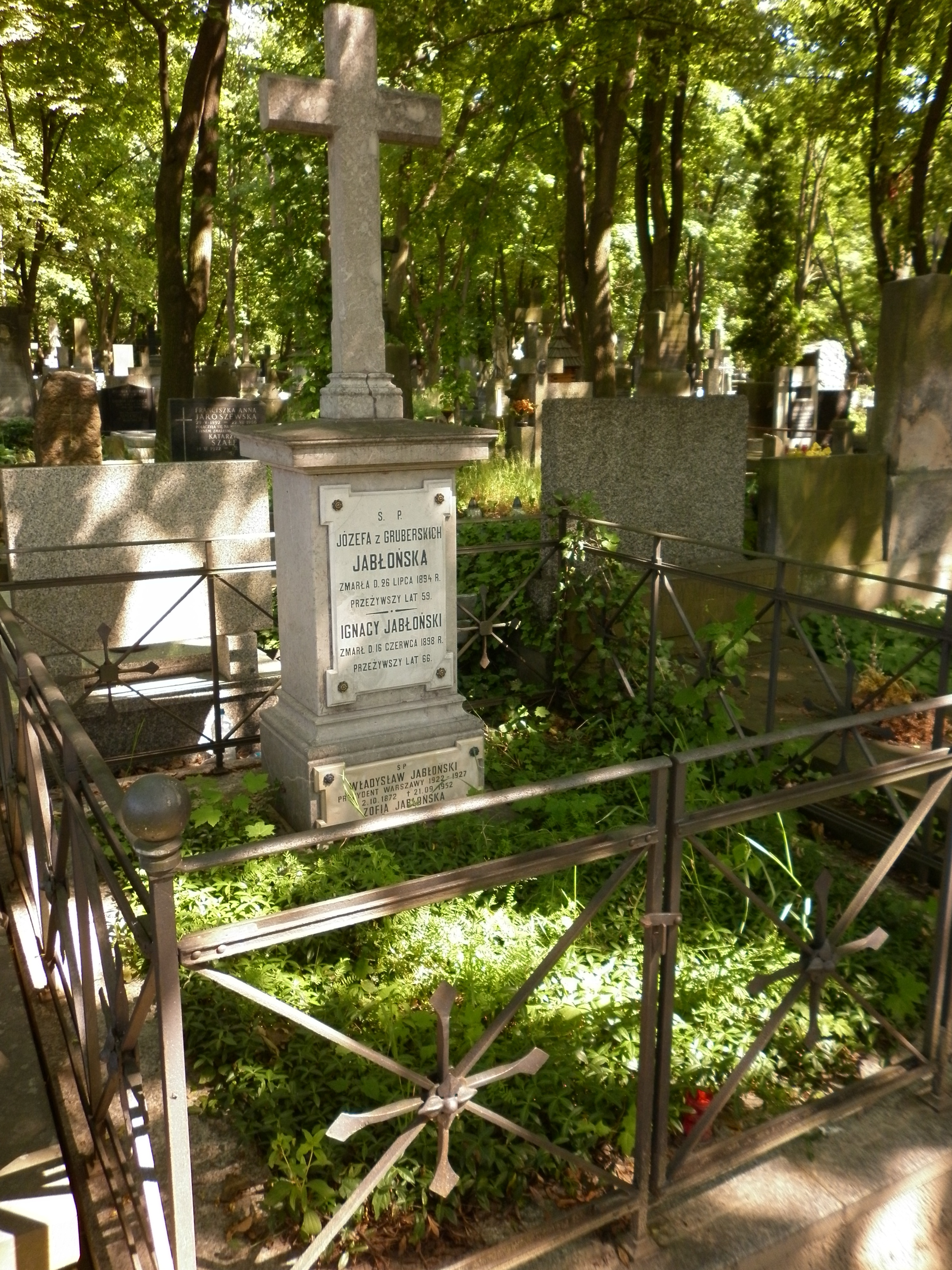
The grave of Władysław Jabłoński at the Powązki Cemetery in Warsaw, Poland.

Władysław Jabłoński was born on 2 October 1872 in Warsaw in the Kingdom of Poland, Russian Empire (now part of Poland). He was a son of Ignacy Jabłoński and Józefa Jabłońska (née Gruberski). In 1890 he has graduated from a vocational school in Warsaw. He has then studied architecture in Saint Petersburg and at the Vienna University of Technology. For many years he has worked in the City Administration of Warsaw. In 1918 he co-founded the Warsaw Worker's Trade Unions Management. Jabłoński was also the city head architect. Additionally, he taught at the private university of the Science Courses Association. From 7 December 1922 to 6 July 1927, he was the mayor of Warsaw. While in office, the inflation in the city economy was stopped, and the manufacturing and service industries were greatly developed. The housing situation was also improved. Jabłoński died on 21 September 1952, 11 days before his 80th birthday, in Warsaw, and was buried at the Powązki Cemetery in the city (grave no. 63–4–6,7).

== Awards and decorations ==
- Commander's Cross of the Order of Polonia Restituta (1924)
- Officer of the National Order of the Legion of Honour
