= Warsaw Voivodeship (1975–1998) =

Former voivodeship of Poland

Coordinates: 52°15′02″N 21°00′37″E

- Voivodeship of the Polish People's Republic and Third Republic of Poland
- 1975–1998
- The Warsaw Voivodeship within Poland, between 1975 and 1998.
- Capital: Warsaw
- Area
  - 1997: 3,788 km^{2} (1,463 sq mi)
- Population
  - 1975: 2 154 700
  - 1997: 2 416 600
- Government
  - Type: Voivodeship
- Voivode
  - 1975–1982 (first): Jerzy Majewski
  - 1997–1998 (last): Maciej Gielecki
- History
  - Established: 1 June 1975
  - Disestablished: 31 December 1998
- Contained within
  - Country: Polish People's Republic (1975–1989); Third Republic of Poland (1989–1998)
- Political subdivisions: 58 gminas
Preceded by	Succeeded by
Warsaw Voivodeship; Warsaw	Masovian Voivodeship

The Warsaw Voivodeship, (Note: Polish: Województwo warszawskie) between 1975 and 1990 known as the Warsaw Capital Voivodeship, (Note: Polish: województwo stołeczne warszawskie) was a voivodeship (province) of the Polish People's Republic from 1975 to 1989, and the Third Republic of Poland from 1989 to 1998. Its capital was Warsaw, and it was located in the central Masovia. It was established on 1 June 1975, from the part of the Warsaw Voivodeship, and a city voivodeship of Warsaw, and existed until 31 December 1998, when it was incorporated into then-established Masovian Voivodeship.

== History ==
The Warsaw Capital Voivodeship was established on 1 June 1975, as part of the administrative reform, and was one of the voivodeships (provinces) of the Polish People's Republic. It was formed from the part of the territory of the Warsaw Voivodeship, and a city voivodeship of Warsaw, which became its capital. In 1975, it was inhabited by 2 154 700 people.

On 9 December 1989, the Polish People's Republic was replaced by the Third Republic of Poland. In 1990, its name had been changed to Warsaw Voivodeship. In 1997, it had a population of 2 418 400, and an area of 3788 km². It existed until 31 December 1998, when it was incorporated into then-established Masovian Voivodeship.

== Subdivisions ==
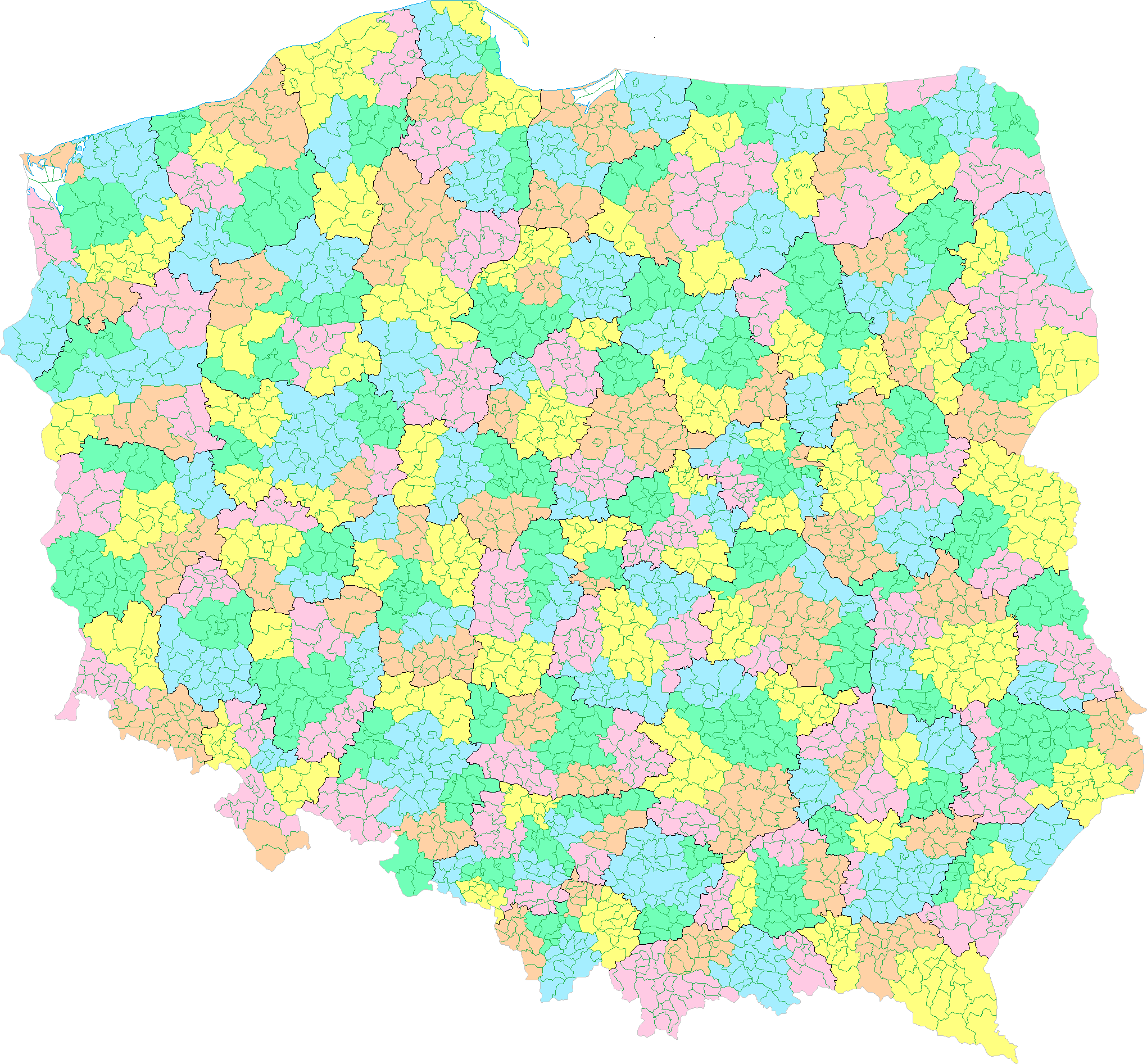
The district offices and gminas (municipalities) of Poland in 1998, including the Warsaw Voivodeship.

In 1997, the voivodeship was divided into 58 gminas (municipalities), including 25 urban municipalities, 14 urban-rural municipalities, and 20 rural municipalities. It had 28 towns and cities.

From 1990 to 1998, it was additionally divided into 7 district offices, each composing of the several municipalities.

== Demographics ==
=== Population ===
Year	Population
1975	2 154 700
1980	2 319 100
1985	2 412 200
1990	2 421 600
1995	2 416 600
1997	2 418 400

=== Major cities ===
The biggest cities and towns, by the population in 1995, were:

- Warsaw (1,638,300);
- Pruszków (53,000);
- Legionowo (50,600);
- Otwock (44,000);
- Wołomin (36,500);
- Nowy Dwór Mazowiecki (27,200);
- Piaseczno (25,200);
- Grodzisk Mazowiecki (24,900);
- Piastów (23,700).

== Leaders ==
The leader of the administrative division was a voivode. From 1975 to 1990, the mayor of Warsaw held the office of the voivode. The people holding the office over the years were:

- 1975–1982: Jerzy Majewski
- 1982–1986: Mieczysław Dębicki
- 1986–1990: Jerzy Bolesławski
- 1990: Stanisław Wyganowski
- 1990: Adam Langer
- 1990–1997: Bohdan Jastrzębski
- 1997–1998: Maciej Gielecki
