= Karol Fryderyk Woyda =

Polish politician (1771–1846)

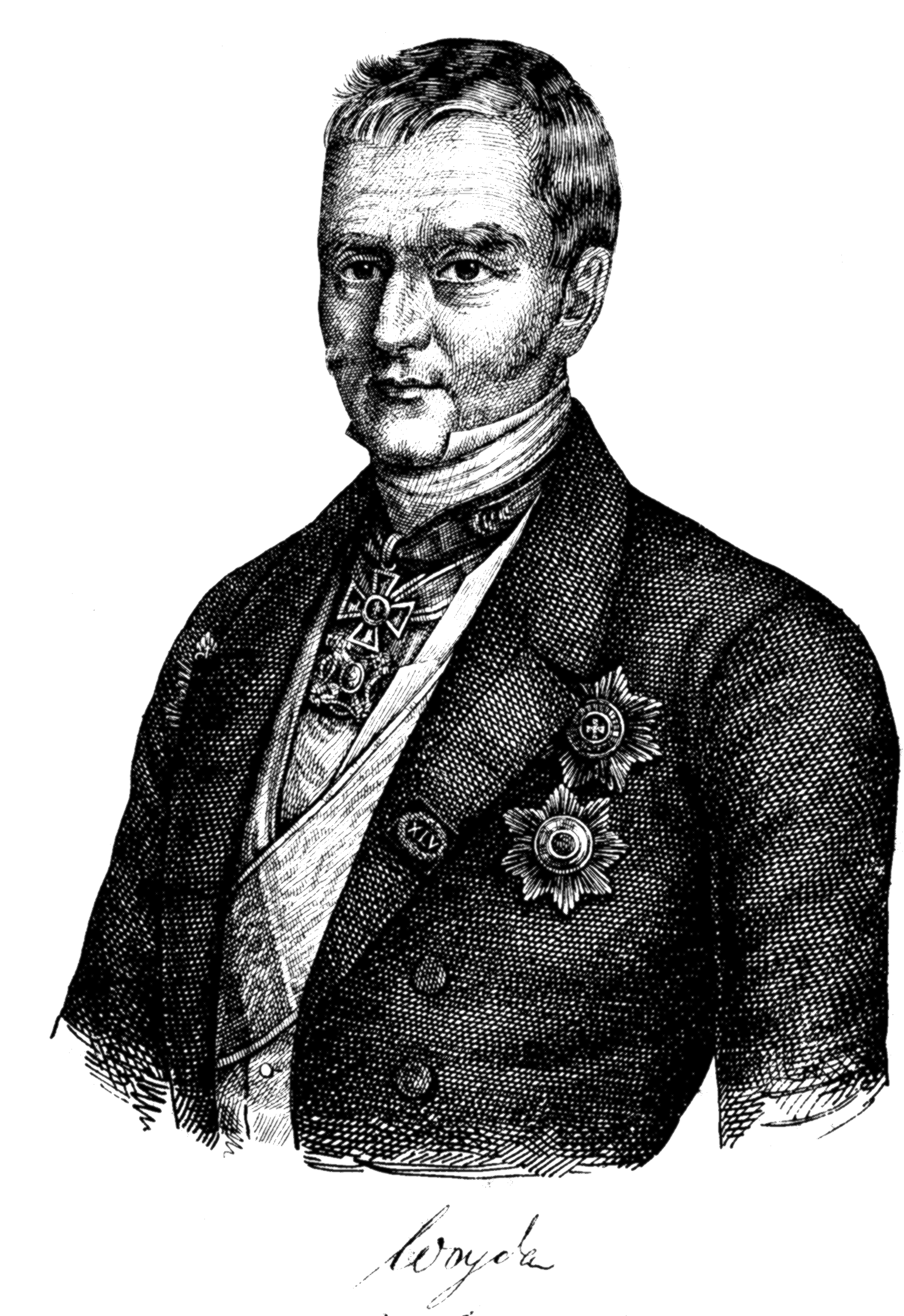

President of Warsaw
- In office 6 January 1816 – 30 November 1830
- Preceded by: Stanisław Węgrzecki
- Succeeded by: Stanisław Węgrzecki

Personal details
- Born: 23 November 1771 Leszno, Polish-Lithuanian Commonwealth
- Died: 21 February 1846 (aged 74) Warsaw, Congress Poland

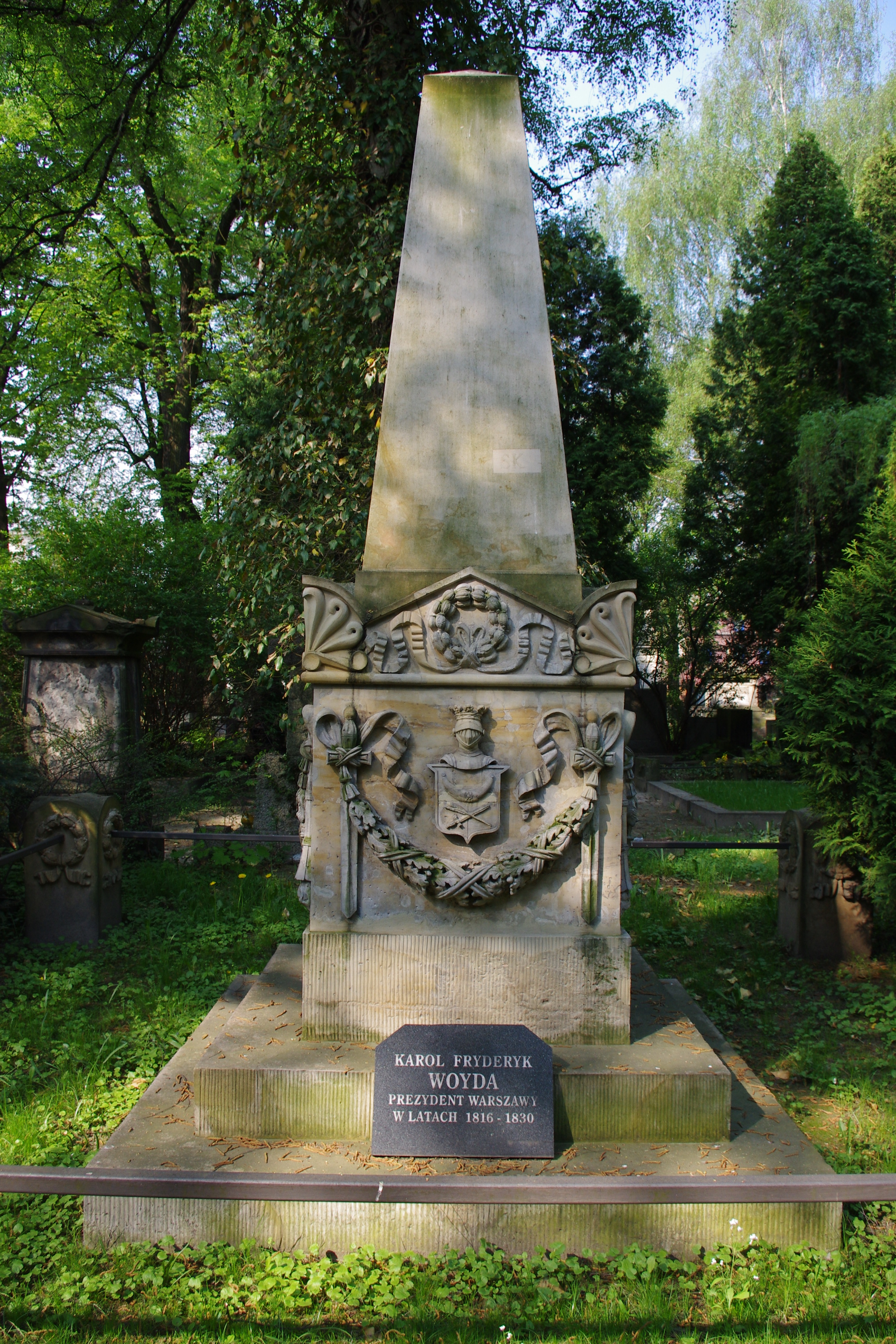
Grave of Karol Fryderyk Woyda in Warsaw

Karol Fryderyk Woyda (also Wojda, 25 November 1771 in Leszno – 21 February 1846 in Warsaw) was a Polish politician and President of Warsaw between 1816 and 1830.

His son Kazimierz Woyda eventually also became President of Warsaw from February 1862 to August 1862.
