= Aleksander Graybner =

Polish politician

Aleksander Graybner was the President of Warsaw from 1837 to 1839 November 1847.
