= Jakub Ignacy Łaszczyński =

Polish regional administrator (1791–1865)

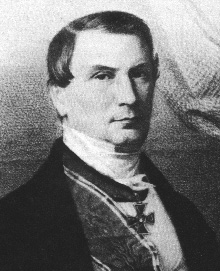
Jakub Ignacy Łaszczyński

Jakub Ignacy Łaszczyński (24 July 1791 – 18 September 1865) was a Polish regional administrator who, between 1831 and 1837, held the post of President of Warsaw.

A native of Poznań, Jakub Ignacy Łaszczyński first entered into the service of the Duchy of Warsaw around the time of his sixteenth birthday in 1807. When, in the following decade, the Duchy was absorbed into Congress Poland, he also served in that administration, eventually rising to the position of President of Warsaw in 1831.

In 1840 he was appointed the civilian governor of Masovia Governorate, the administrative region which had Warsaw as its capital. His final service, until 1864, the year before his death, was as governor of the Warsaw Governorate, the larger region which absorbed the Masovia Governorate.

Jakub Ignacy Łaszczyński died in Warsaw seven weeks after his 74th birthday.
