= Stanisław Nowodworski =

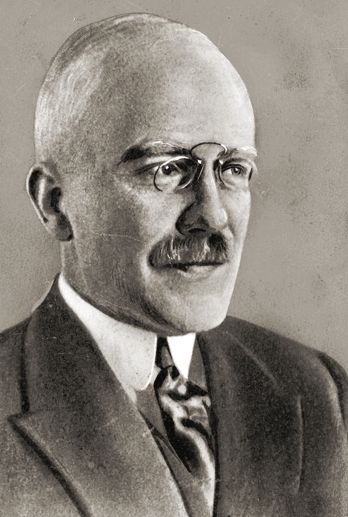
- Nowodworski in 1923

Minister of Justice
- In office 24 July 1920 – 19 June 1921
- Prime Minister: Wincenty Witos
- Succeeded by: Bronisław Sobolewski

Minister of Justice
- In office 28 May 1923 – 15 December 1923
- Prime Minister: Wincenty Witos
- Preceded by: Wacław Makowski
- Succeeded by: Włodzimierz Wyganowski

Mayor of Warsaw
- In office 28 November 1921 – 7 December 1922
- Preceded by: Piotr Drzewiecki
- Succeeded by: Władysław Jabłoński

Personal details
- Born: 11 October 1873 Warsaw, Congress Poland, Russian Empire
- Died: 22 September 1931 (aged 57) Warsaw, Second Polish Republic
- Resting place: Powązki Cemetery, Warsaw, Poland
- Party: Polish Christian Democratic Party
- Parent: Jan Nowodworskki (father)
- Education: Saint Petersburg State University

Stanisław Marian Nowodworski (born October 11, 1873, in Warsaw; died September 22, 1931, in Warsaw) was a Polish lawyer, politician, social activist who served as Minister of Justice, senator of the first term in the Second Polish Republic and as Mayor of Warsaw. He was the son of Jan Nowodworskki , grandson of Franciszek Nowodworski.

== Biography ==
After graduating from high school in Warsaw, he began studying law at the University of St. Petersburg, graduating in 1897. He then returned to Warsaw, where he completed his apprenticeship at the District Court and was appointed a sworn attorney in 1903.

From 1907, he participated in the activities of the Christian Workers' Association. In 1914–1915, he was a member of the Civic Committee of the City of Warsaw, and from August to September 11, 1915, he served as prosecutor of the Tribunal at the Civic Committee. He then became active in the civic guard. In 1916, he was elected a Warsaw councilor. Nowodworski was one of the founders of the Christian National Party, which he represented in the Inter-Party Political Circle from November 1916 to October 1918.

From January 13, 1917, he was imprisoned in German prisons in Lauban (Lubań) and then in Modlin.

In the spring of 1919, he was re-elected as a Warsaw councilor. On April 1, 1919, he was appointed a judge of the Court of Appeal. From July 24, 1920, to June 19, 1921, he served as Minister of Justice in Wincenty Witos's first government. On November 28, 1921, he became Mayor of Warsaw. He resigned from this position on December 7, 1922, when he was appointed a member of the Supreme Administrative Tribunal. On November 12, 1922, he was elected senator on behalf of the National Christian Labor Party (he became chairman of his party's Senate parliamentary caucus). From May 28, 1923, to December 15, 1923, he again served as Minister of Justice in Wincenty Witos's second government. In May 1926, he was appointed a judge of the Supreme Court and resigned from his senatorial seat. On October 29, 1926, he was appointed a member of the Competence Tribunal, and in 1930, he became vice-chairman of the Association of Judges and Prosecutors of the Republic of Poland.

Stanisław Nowodworski was buried at Powązki Cemetery (section P-3-14).

In 2022, at the initiative of Prime Minister Mateusz Morawiecki, Minister Nowodworski's grave was renovated. The entire project was implemented by the Stare Powązki Foundation in cooperation with the Chancellery of the Prime Minister.
