= Friedrich Georg Tilly =

President of Warsaw

Friedrich Georg Tilly (died 1811) was a Prussian statesman and the President of Warsaw from 23 April 1799 to 27 November 1806.
