= Wojda =

Wojda or Woyda is a gender-neutral Polish surname. Notable people with this surname include:

- Edward Wojda (1941–1990), Polish wrestler
- Karol Fryderyk Woyda (1771–1845), President of Warsaw, Poland
- Kazimierz Woyda (1812–1877), President of Warsaw, son of Karol
- Tadeusz Wojda (born 1957), Polish archbishop
- Witold Woyda (1939–2008), Polish fencer
- Wojciech Wojda (born 1966), Polish singer
