= Free Royal Cities Act =

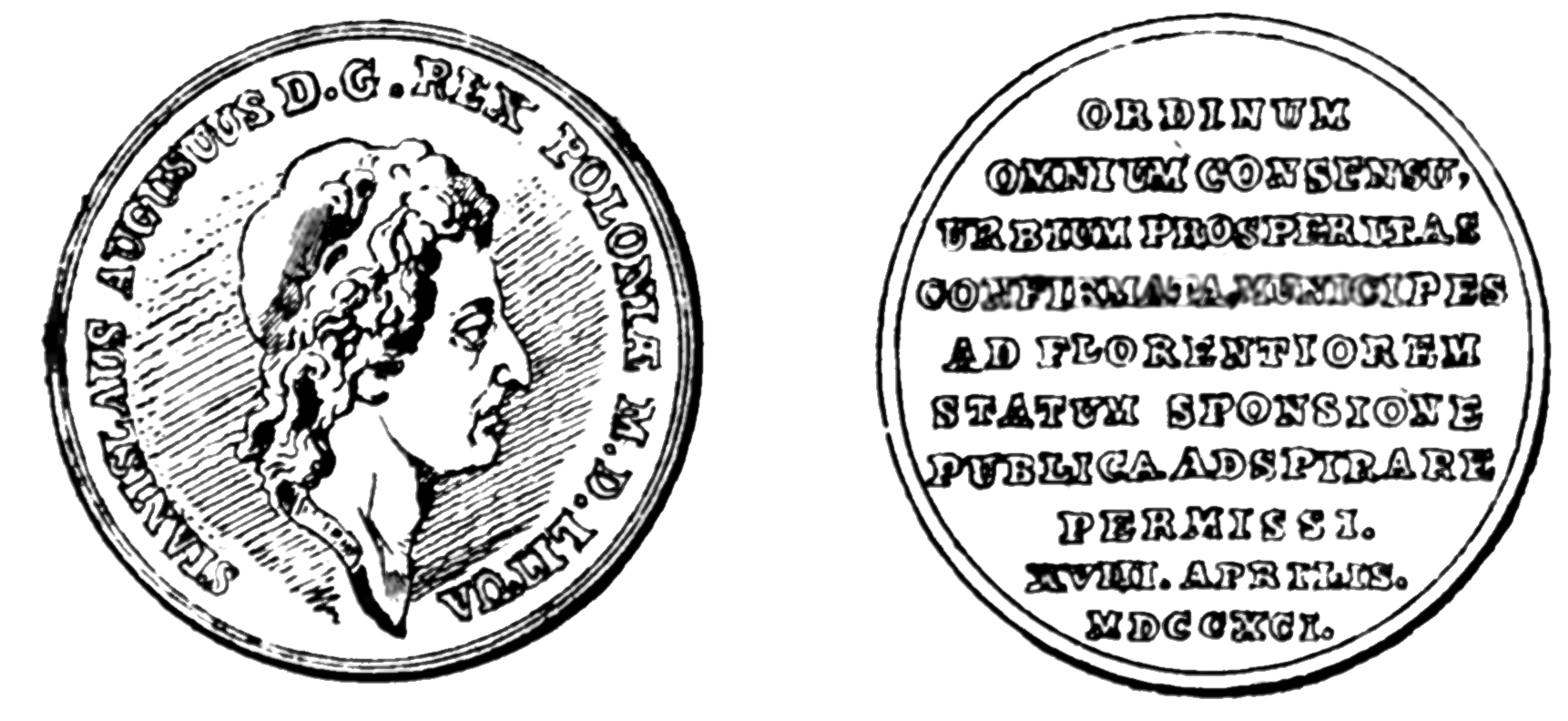
Medal commemorating Free Royal Cities Act, 1791. Obverse: Profile of King Stanisław August.

The Free Royal Cities Act (Polish: Miasta Nasze Królewskie wolne w państwach Rzeczypospolitej, lit. 'Our Free Royal Cities in the States of the Commonwealth'), also known as the Law on the Cities (Polish: Prawo o miastach), was an act adopted by the Four-Year Sejm (1788–1792) of the Polish–Lithuanian Commonwealth on April 18, 1791, in the run-up to the adoption of the Constitution of May 3, 1791. The Act was subsequently incorporated in extenso into the Constitution by reference in its Article III.

The Act granted to the Commonwealth's townspeople of the royal cities personal security, the right to acquire landed property and eligibility to military officers' commissions and public offices, It did not give them the rights of szlachta (nobility) but allow the possibility for ennoblement. It also provided townspeople the right of representation in the Sejm as advisers in the cities' affairs.

== See also ==
- Black Procession
- Jan Dekert
