= Franz Schimmelpfennig von der Ove =

German President of Warsaw

Franz Schimmelpfennig von der Oye (died 1799) was the German President of Warsaw during the Prussian occupation.
