= Mieczysław Bareja =

Polish politician

Mayor of Warsaw
- In office 5 October 1994 – 3 November 1994
- Preceded by: Stanisław Wyganowski
- Succeeded by: Marcin Święcicki

Personal details
- Born: 18 October 1939 Siedlce, Poland
- Died: 10 February 2003 (aged 63) Warsaw, Poland
- Resting place: Bródno Cemetery, Warsaw, Poland
- Party: Alliance of Democrats
- Education: University of Warsaw
- Occupation: Judge; Politician

Mieczysław Bareja (Polish: [mjɛˈt͡ʂɘ̟.swaf baˈrɛ.ja]; 18 October 1939 – 10 February 2003) was a judge and politician. He was a judge of the appellate court, and the mayor of Warsaw, Poland, in 1994.

== Biography ==
Mieczysław Bareja was born on 18 October 1939 in Siedlce, Poland.

He had graduated the law from the University of Warsaw, and begun working in the jurisprudence in 1963. In 1981 he became the secretary of the Warsaw committee of the Alliance of Democrats. He unsuccessfully attempted to get its mandate to run for the office of a member of Sejm of Poland in the 1989 parliamentary election. In 1990 he became a judge of the Appellate Court in Warsaw, and was also a leader of the Warsaw Voivodeship Electoral Commission. From 1990 to 1997 he was a chairperson of the Warsaw Regional Electoral Commission.

On 5 October 1994, he was appointed as the mayor of Warsaw by an informal short-lived political coalition in the Warsaw City Council, consisting of the Democratic Left Alliance and Right Together. On 3 November 1994, he was dismissed from his position, after the council had rejected the cabinet proposed by him. The same day was formed a new coalition, consisting of the Democratic Left Alliance and the Freedom Union. Marcin Święcicki was then appointed as the new mayor.

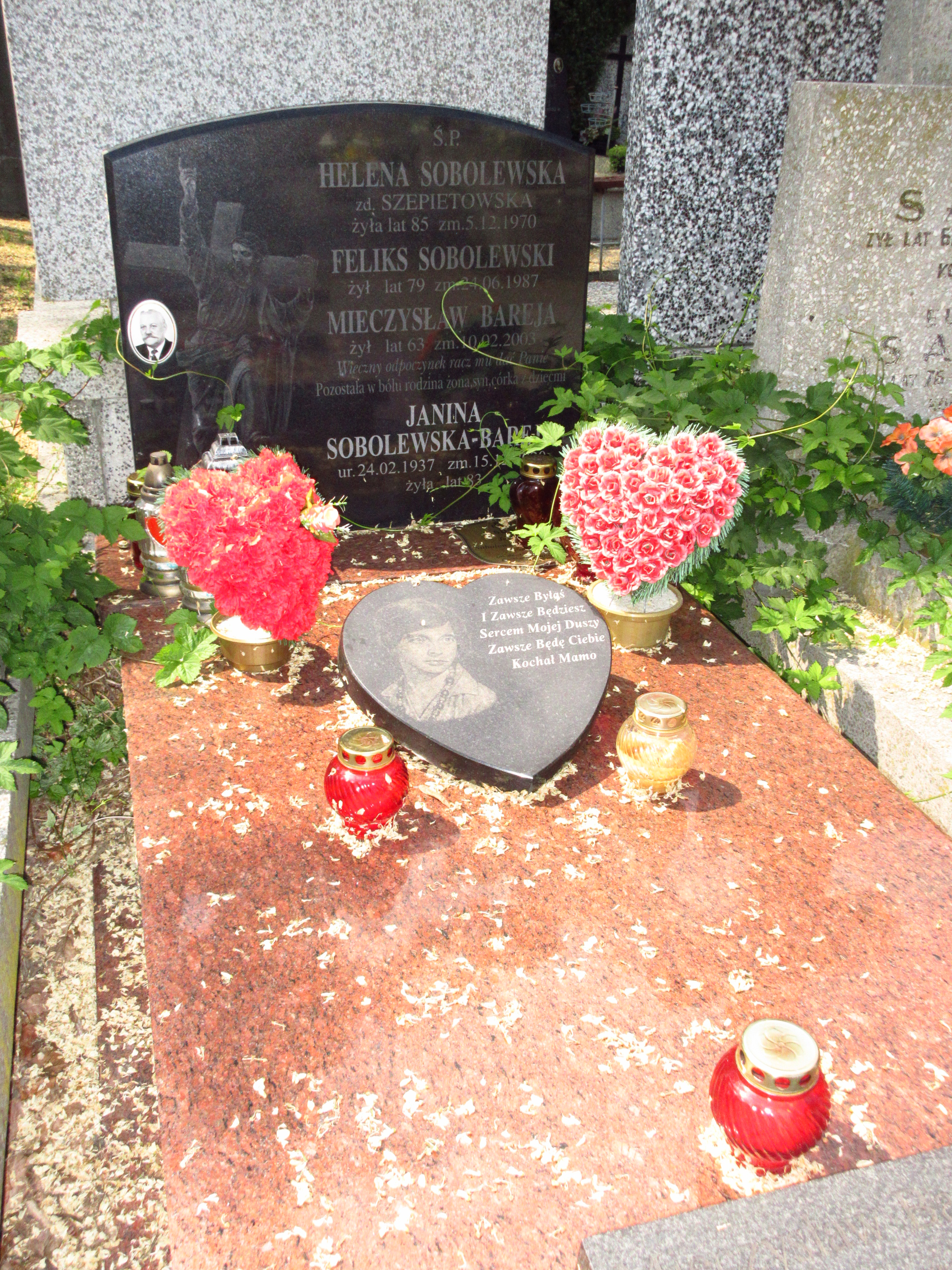
The grave of Mieczysław Bareja at the Bródno Cemetery in Warsaw.

In the 1990s Bareja was a judge in the Lustration Court. He was accused of committing lustration, by allegedly not reveling his past connections to the Security Service. Bareja died on 10 February 2003, on the day of his trial. He was posthumously found not guilty, and his supposed connections to the Security Service dismissed. Bareja was buried at the Bródno Cemetery in Warsaw, in the grave no. 68E-1-23.
