= Joachim Moszyński =

President of Warsaw

Joachim Moszyński (3 March 1758 – 1821) was the President of Warsaw.
