= Teodor Andrault de Langeron =

Russian politician (1804–1885)

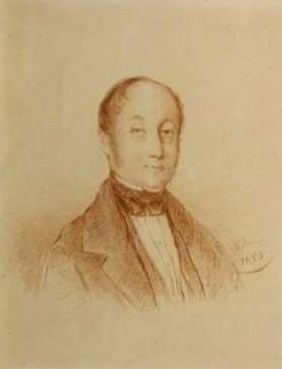
- Portrait, 1853

President of Warsaw
- In office 1847–1862

Personal details
- Born: 25 March 1804
- Died: 19 July 1885 (aged 81)

Teodor Andrault de Langeron (Russian: Фёдор Алекса́ндрович Андро́, romanized: Fyodor Aleksandrovich Andro; 25 March 1804 – 19 July 1885) was a Russian politician who served as the President of Warsaw from 1847 to 1862.
