= Jan Dekert =

Polish merchant and activist

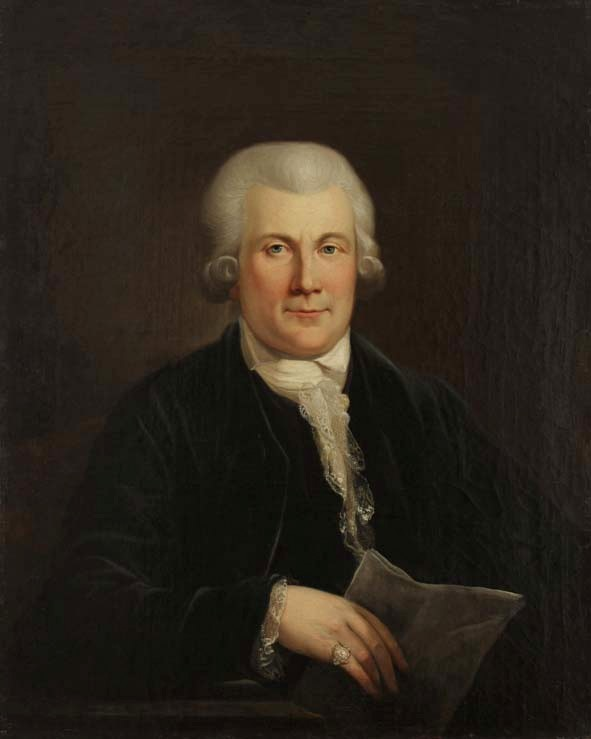
Jan Dekert

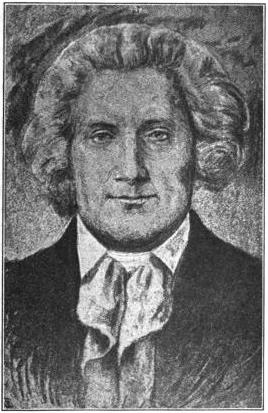
Jan Dekert

Jan Dekert or Jan Dekiert (1738 – 4 October 1790) was a Polish merchant of German descent and political activist. Starting in the 1760s, he rose to become one of the most prominent merchants in the Polish capital of Warsaw. He was an activist arguing for more rights for the burghers in the Polish–Lithuanian Commonwealth while opposing Jewish merchants. As the representative of Warsaw, he was elected a deputy to the Sejms of 1784 and 1786, as well as to the Great Sejm (1788–1792). He was the mayor of Warsaw (1789–1790), during which period he organized the Black Procession on 2 December 1789 (a march of burghers who delivered a petition to the king). This was a major step towards the passing of the Free Royal Cities Act enfranchising burghers, as one of the reforms of the Great Sejm and part of the Constitution of the 3rd May, 1791.

== Biography ==
He was born in 1738 in the town of Bledzew. The exact date and his family background are unknown, as any relevant documents have been lost. He likely had beyond basic education, and some sum of money when he left Bledzew and traveled to Warsaw.

In December 1756 Dekert was admitted to the Warsaw "youth" Confraternity of Merchants (warszawska konfraternia kupiecka "młodziańska"). He started out as a clerk in a cloth store of Kazimierz Martynkowski (or Marcinkowski), in whose house he also stayed. In April 1761 he married his patron's daughter, Róża Martynkowska. By 1762 he had taken over the cloth store, moved from the "youth" Confraternity of Merchants to the "senior" ("starsza") one, and become a full citizen of Warsaw. Some time before 1786, Róża died, and Dekert married Antonina Dembska (Dębska). He had several children from his two marriages, among them Jan Dekert, future bishop of Warsaw.

Dekert's rise to mayor began with his first official positions in the Warsaw merchant organizations in the 1760s. In the early 1760s he was among the steering group of the "youth" Confraternity, which he resigned in 1762 upon joining the "senior" one. There is some confusion regarding his exact positions and the dates he held them. According to Zienkowska, in 1767 he received a position (gminny) in the magistrate of Warsaw. According to Jędruch, he became Alderman (a position usually known in Polish as "radny") of Warsaw in 1769, but this is contradicted by Zienkowska; according to her, it was only in 1776 that he reached the rank of "ławnik" in the magistrate. He also served as an elder ("starszy"; Jędruch translates this as an alderman) for the Confraternity of Merchants from 1771 to 1785.

Along with his political career, Dekert's business enterprise was growing. He gathered enough savings to become a cofounder of the Company of Woolen Manufacture in 1766 (Kompania Manufaktur Wełnianych). In 1775 the Sejm granted his request to buy landed estates (a privilege usually restricted only to the nobility). In 1776 he leased the Tobacco Monopoly (or Company; Kompania Tabaczna) from the Polish Treasury; ten years later, in 1786, he leased a theatre in Warsaw.

As the representative of Warsaw, he was elected a deputy to the Sejms of 1784 and 1786, as well as to the Great Sejm (1788–1792). In the meantime, in February 1789, he was elected mayor of Warsaw; he would be reelected in 1790 (as a mayor of Warsaw, he succeeded Wojciech Lobert, and would in turn be succeeded by Józef Michał Łukasiewicz). During the Great Sejm, together with Hugo Kołłątaj, Dekert organized the confederation of 141 cities and towns and was at the forefront of demanding the representation and enfranchisement of the burghers in the Sejm; notably, he helped organize the Black Procession on 2 December 1789 (a march of burghers who delivered a petition to the king). The burghers demanded similar privileges to those held by the nobles (szlachta). Their demands included the right to buy and own land estates, the right to be represented in the Polish parliament (Sejm) and reforms to the urban law. The procession influenced the Great Sejm to create a Commission for the Cities (Deputacja w sprawie miast) tasked with addressing those concerns during the works on the new constitution.

He was a vocal critic of Jews, accusing them of unfair competition.

He spent much of his fortune on political activism, and was nearly bankrupt by the time of his death. In February 1790, despite his objections, he was pressured by the public opinion into reelection for a second (yearly) term of office as the mayor of Warsaw. It is likely that major reasons he preferred not to have been reelected were his ailing business operations and his worsening health. He led his last public debate on 31 April 1790, and withdrew from politics afterward. He died on 4 October 1790 in Warsaw. He was buried in St. John's Archcathedral, and his large funeral was paid for by the City of Warsaw.

He died before the Free Royal Cities Act, enfranchising burghers, was passed in 1791 as one of the reforms of the Great Sejm, next to the Constitution of the 3rd May, 1791.

== Legacy ==
His contemporary, poet Franciszek Dionizy Kniaźnin, called him the "leader of Polish burghers". In 1896 a plaque dedicated to him in St. John's Archcathedral proclaimed him "the first defender and representative of the burgher class in the Commonwealth".

Jan Dekert is one of the characters in Jan Matejko's painting of the "Adoption of the Polish Constitution of May 3, 1791".

== See also ==
- History of Poland in the Early Modern era (1569–1795)
