= Paweł Bieliński =

Polish politician

Paweł Bieliński (? – July 4, 1807), was a Polish politician. He served as the mayor of Warsaw between 17 April 1807 and 4 July 1807 in the Napoleonic Poland.
