= Andrzej Rafałowicz =

Polish merchant, banker, and politician

Andrzej Rafałowicz (1736-1823) was a Polish merchant, banker and politician. He served as President of Warsaw for two terms: in 1793-94 and a second time in 1794-96.
