= Józef Michał Łukasiewicz =

Polish merchant and politician

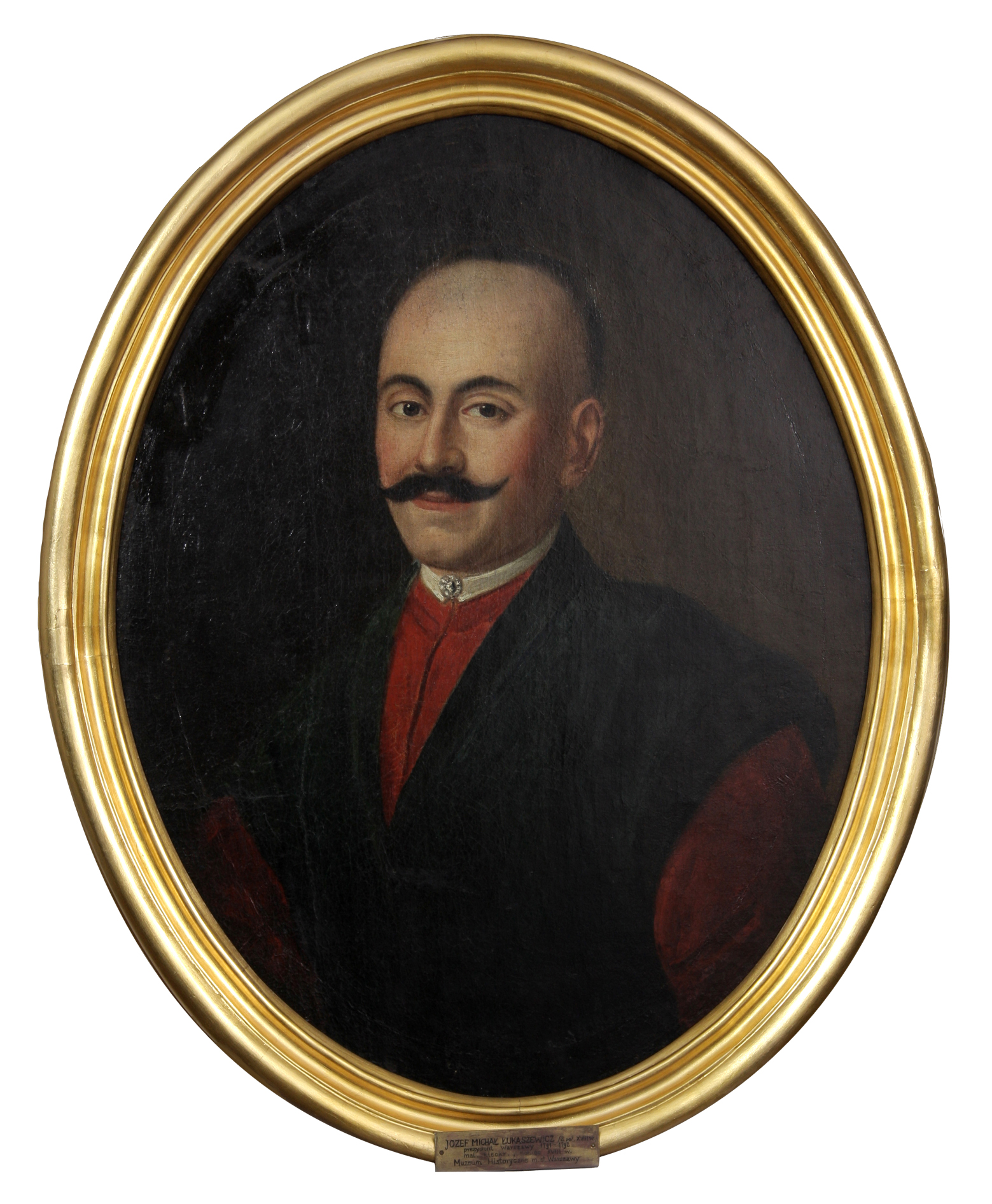
Józef Michał Łukasiewicz

Józef Michał Łukasiewicz (died after 1794), was a Polish merchant and politician. He served as President of Warsaw for two terms: in 1792-93 and 1794-96. He was an associate of Jan Dekert.
