= Aleksander Miller =

Russian nobleman (1862-1923)

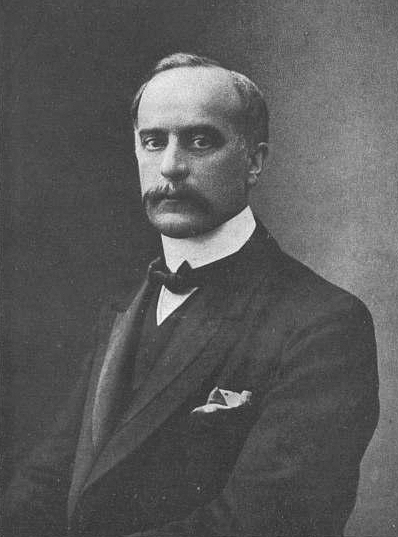

Aleksander Miller (Müller, Russian: Алекса́ндр Алекса́ндрович Ми́ллер, Aleksandr Aleksandrovich Miller (11 April 1862, Saint Petersburg – 1923, Baden-Baden) was a Russian nobleman, the last Russian President of Warsaw.

Miller was a graduate of St. Petersburg University. He notably owned and managed an estate near Ariogala, being a neighbour and friend of Pyotr Stolypin. From 1902 to 1909 he was elected Marshal of Nobility of the Kovno Governorate.

Miller was President of Warsaw from 1909 to 1915, up to the moment when the city was occupied by the German army during the World War I.
