= Supreme National Council =

Supreme National Council (Polish: Rada Najwyższa Narodowa) was the central civil government of Poland loyal to the Kościuszko Insurrection. Created by Kościuszko on 10 May 1794 in the camp in Połaniec, it had 8 councillors and 32 deputies.

== See also ==
- Provisional Temporary Council
