= Kalikst Witkowski =

Russian general and President of Warsaw

- Born: April 2, 1818; Kobryn
- Died: July 24, 1877 (aged 59); Karlovy Vary
- Known for: President of Warsaw (September 16, 1863 – October 1, 1875)
- Parents: Kacper Witkowski (father); Józefa (mother)

Kalikst Witkowski (2 April 1818 in Kobryn – 24 July 1877 in Karlovy Vary) was a Russian general and President of Warsaw from 16 September 1863 to 1 October 1875. He was the son of Kacper Witkowski and Józefa (nee Pągowska). Witkowski became President of Warsaw during the January Uprising. Loyal to Russian authorities, he also chaired the Pawiak Investigation Commission, which captured insurgents and conducted interrogations of independence activists. He was cherished by Russian officials and very unpopular with Poles.
