= Stanisław Węgrzecki =

Polish politician

Stanisław Węgrzecki (10 November 1765, Warsaw - 12 February 1845, Warsaw) was the President of Warsaw.

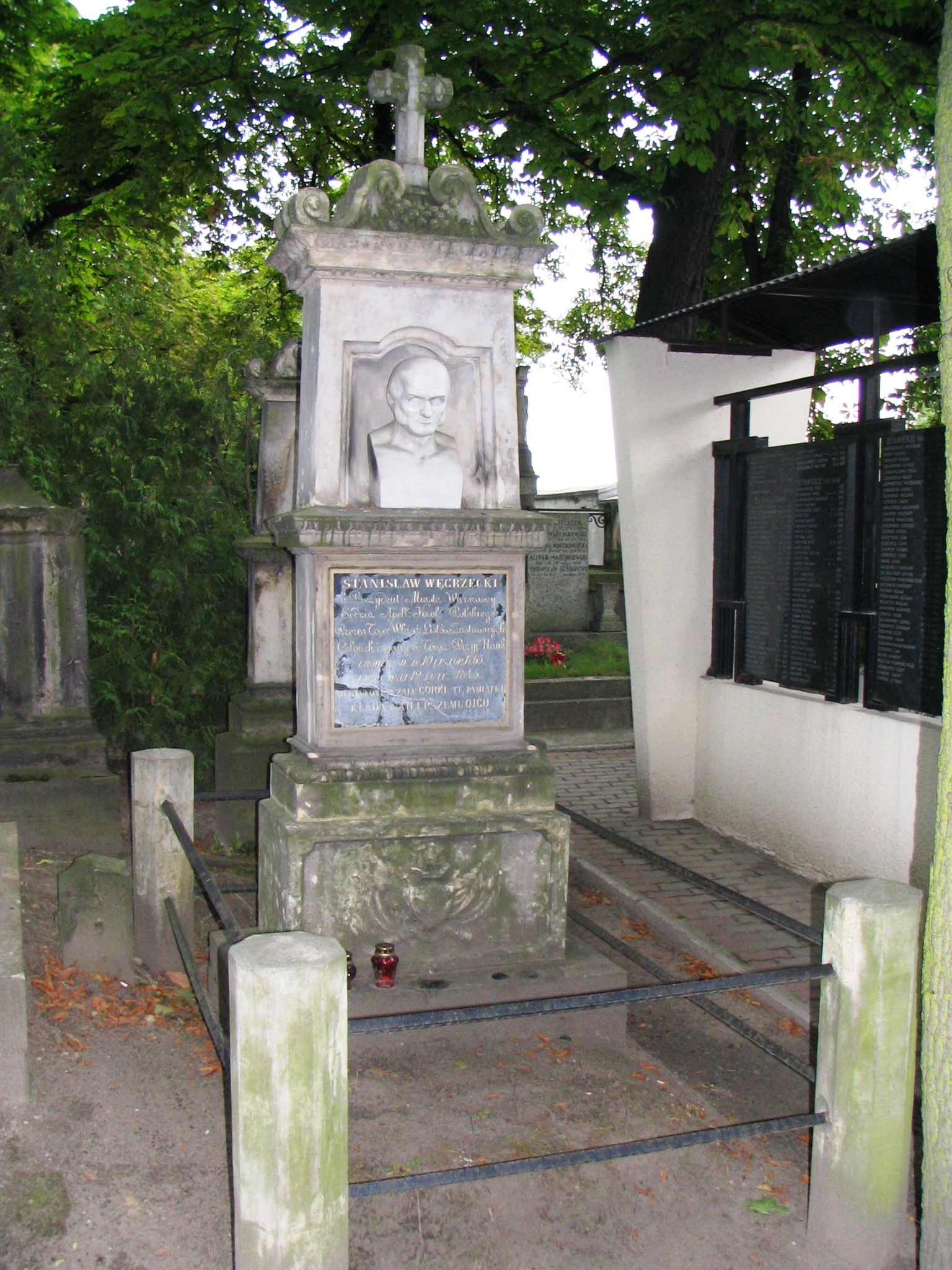
The grave of Stanisław Węgrzecki
