= Jerzy Bolesławski =

Mayor of Warsaw from 1986 to 1990

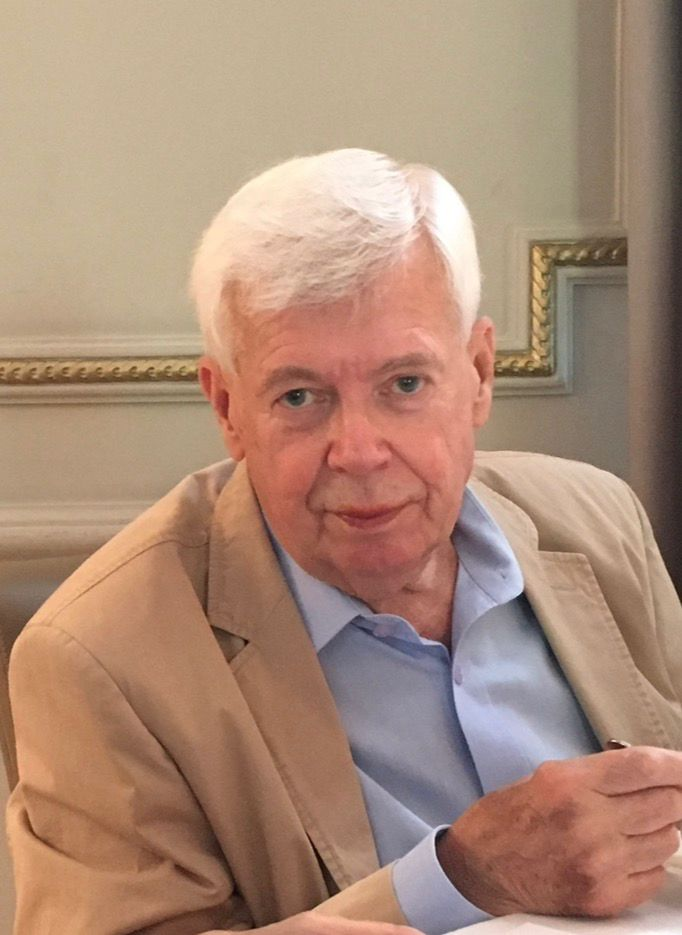

39th Mayor of Warsaw
- In office 1 August 1986 – 30 January 1990
- Preceded by: Mieczysław Dębicki
- Succeeded by: Stanisław Wyganowski

Personal details
- Born: 25 February 1940 (age 86) Przemyśl, Poland
- Party: Polish United Workers' Party
- Education: Warsaw University of Technology
- Awards

Stanislaw Jerzy Bolesławski (born 25 February 1940) is a Polish politician. He was the mayor of Warsaw from 1986 to 1990.

== Biography ==
Graduate of the Warsaw University of Technology. In the years 1965–1971 manager at the Warsaw Steelworks. He was an activist in youth organizations, including the Union of Socialist Youth (1961–1971). Then from 1966 in the Polish United Workers' Party. He was deputy manager (1972–1974) and manager (1974–1975) of the Propaganda Department of the Warsaw Committee of the Polish United Workers' Party, from 1975 he was a member of the executive of the Warsaw Committee of the Polish United Workers' Party. From 1975 to 1979 he chaired the Council of the Warsaw Federation of the Polish Socialist Youth Union and the Provincial Board of the Union of Socialist Polish Youth. In the period 1979-1980 he was the first secretary of the District Committee of the Polish United Workers' Party, Warsaw Śródmieście, and then secretary of the Warsaw Committee of the Polish United Workers' Party. From 1980 he was the chairman of the Capital Board, and in 1983 he became a member of the Main Board of the Polish-Soviet Friendship Society. From 1980 he was the chairman of the Capital Committee of the ORMO. In the years 1976–1980 he was a councilor of the National Council of the Capital City of Warsaw.

From 1 August 1986 to 30 January 1990 he was the mayor of Warsaw. In the years 1986–1990 he was a member of the Central Control and Audit Commission of the Polish United Workers' Party.

In 1987, during Jerzy Bolesławski's term, Warsaw received the "Medal of the International Year of Peace" from the United Nations. This was a consequence of the initiative from 1986, when the so-called "Peace Appeal" was adopted by the city authorities. It became an official UN document. In 1989, during Jerzy Bolesławski's presidency, the first four partnership agreements of Warsaw were signed. The first one was signed on September 24, 1989 with Toronto, the next one with German Düsseldorf on September 27, 1989, October 22 with Japanese Hamamatsu, and the fourth on November 22 with the French region of Île de France, which, in the urban sense, constituted "Greater Paris". This was the result of earlier arrangements and activities. A year earlier, in 1988, Bolesławski visited, among others, Düsseldorf, where he opened an exhibition devoted to Warsaw and held talks on cultural and infrastructural cooperation. In the same year, he also held talks with representatives of The Hague. During his term, Jerzy Bolesławski also held negotiations with representatives of the Ministry of Housing and Spatial Planning of Sweden, in order to acquire new partners for the construction of, at that time, innovative waste treatment plant. According to historians, Warsaw did not later demonstrate such dynamics in concluding partnership agreements.

== Awards and decorations ==
- Officer's Cross of the Order of Polonia Restituta
- Gold Cross of Merit
- Bronze Cross of Merit
- Gold Medal of Merit for National Defence
- Silver Medal of Merit for National Defence
- Bronze Medal of Merit for National Defence
- Gold Decoration of Janek Krasicki (twice)
- Silver Decoration of Janek Krasicki
- Bronze Decoration of Janek Krasicki
