= Stary Białcz =

- Village
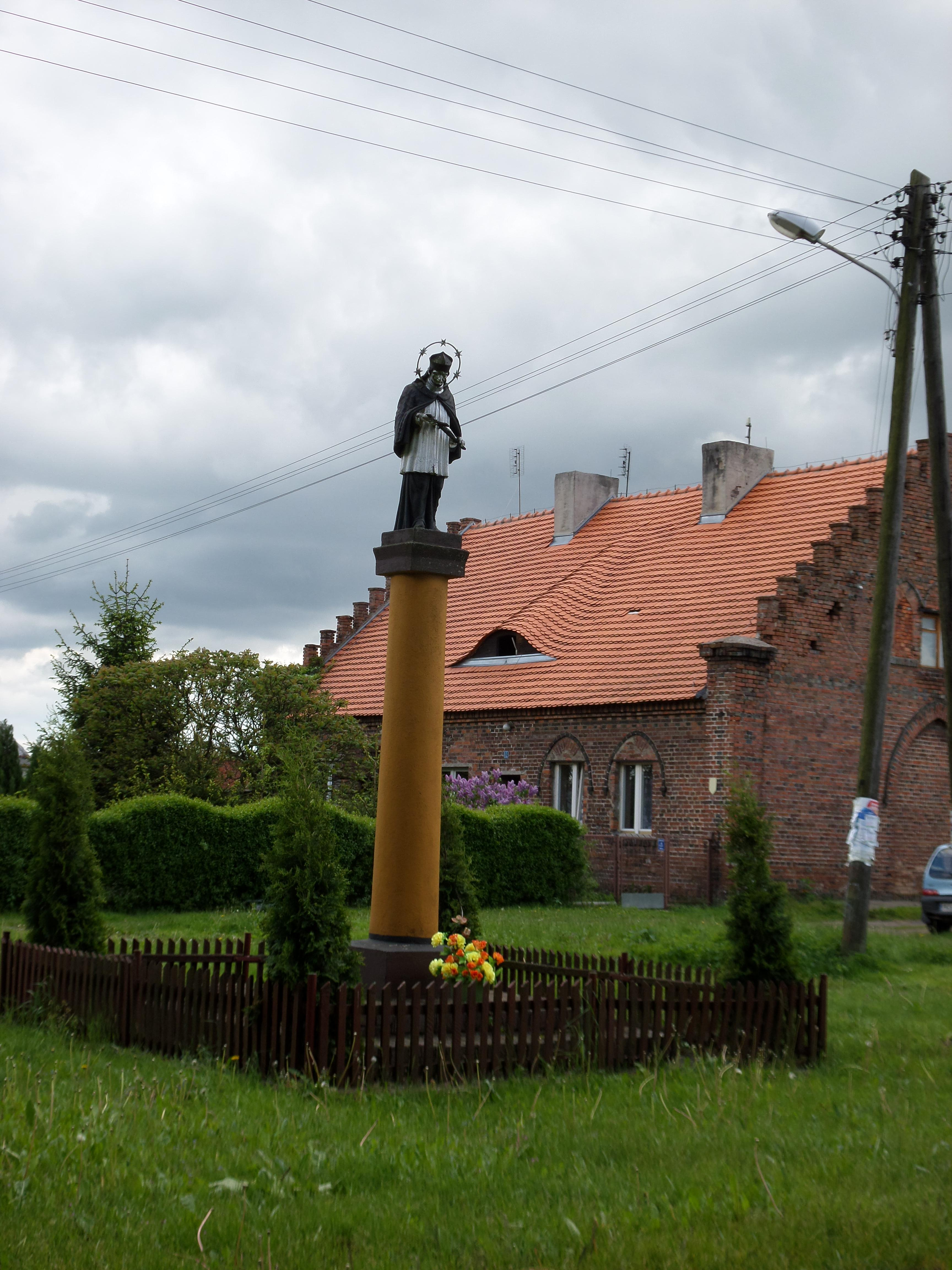

- Location within Poland
- Coordinates: 52°04′19″N 16°32′34″E
- Country: Poland
- Voivodeship: Greater Poland
- County: Kościan
- Gmina: Śmigiel

Stary Białcz [ˈstarɨ ˈbjau̯t͡ʂ] is a village in the administrative district of Gmina Śmigiel, within Kościan County, Greater Poland Voivodeship, in west-central Poland.
