= Ligota, Łask County =

Ligota
- Village
- Location within Poland
- Coordinates: 51°28′47″N 18°55′52″E
- Country: Poland
- Voivodeship: Łódź
- County: Łask
- Gmina: Widawa

Ligota [liˈɡɔta] is a village in the administrative district of Gmina Widawa, within Łask County, Łódź Voivodeship, in central Poland.
