= Mała Wieś, Grójec County =

Mała Wieś
- Village
- Location within Poland
- Coordinates: 51°50′N 20°48′E
- Country: Poland
- Voivodeship: Masovian
- County: Grójec
- Gmina: Belsk Duży

Mała Wieś [ˈmawa ˈvjɛɕ] is a village in the administrative district of Gmina Belsk Duży, within Grójec County, Masovian Voivodeship, in east-central Poland.
