= Mayor of Warsaw =

Head of the local government of Warsaw

- Prezydent m.st. Warszawy
- Coat of arms of Warsaw

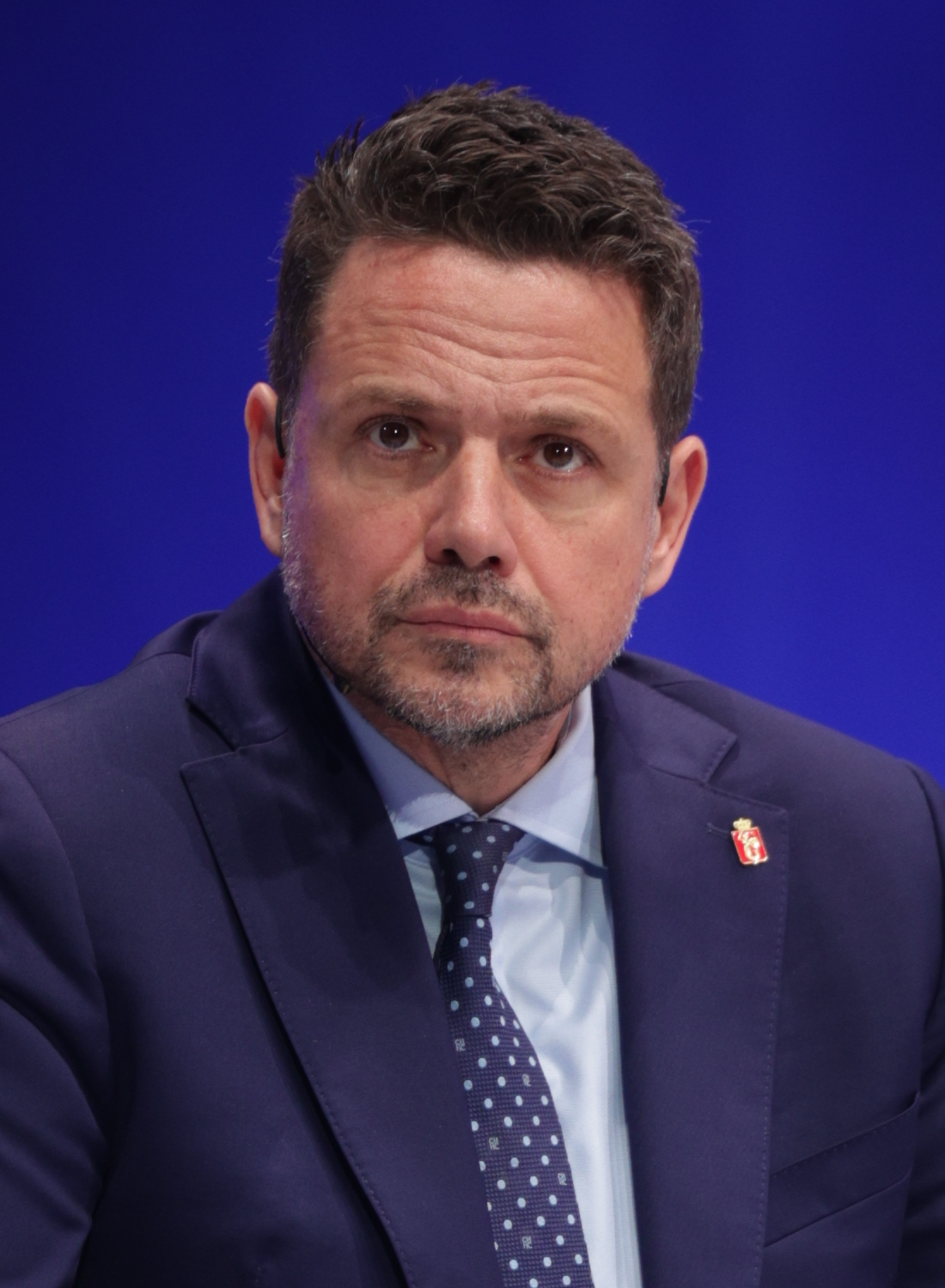
- Incumbent; Rafał Trzaskowski since 22 November 2018
- Term length: 5 years
- Inaugural holder: Jan Andrzej Menich (as mayor of Old Warsaw); Ignacy Wyssogota Zakrzewski (as mayor of Warsaw)
- Formation: 1695 (office of the mayor of Old Warsaw); 1791 (office of the mayor of Warsaw)
- Website: Official website (in English); Official website (in Polish)

The Mayor of Warsaw (officially in Polish: Prezydent miasta stołecznego Warszawy (Note: abbrev. Prezydent m.st. Warszawy, lit. 'President of the Capital City of Warsaw')) is the head of the executive of the capital of Poland elected directly during local elections for a term of five years.

== Overview ==
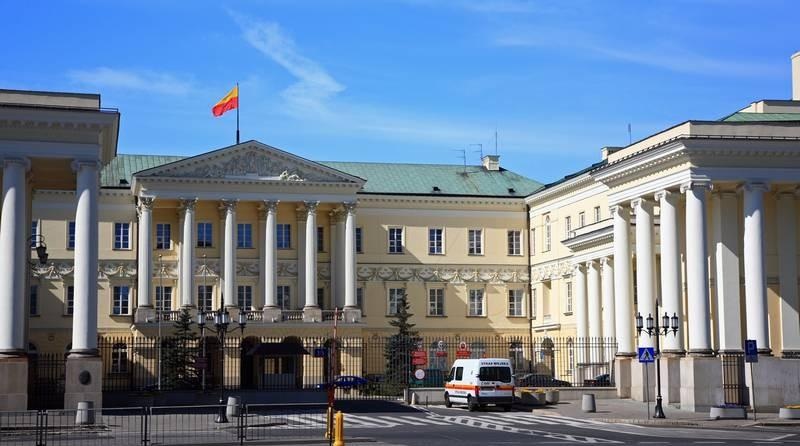
Seat of the Mayor, the Commission Palace.

The first city mayor of Warsaw was Jan Andrzej Menich (1695–1696). The municipal self-government existed in Warsaw until World War II and was restored in 1990 (during the communist times, the National City Council – Miejska Rada Narodowa – governed in Warsaw). Since 1990, the structure of city government has been modified several times. Between 1975 and 1990 the Warsaw city mayors simultaneously led the Warsaw Voivode. In the years 1990-1994, the city mayor of Warsaw was elected by the city council. Subsequently, a controversial reform was introduced, transforming the city in the years of 1994–1999 into a loose municipal union of several gminas, dominated by one of them, the gmina Centrum encompassing the entire inner city. During this period, the mayor of gmina Centrum who was elected by its council was automatically designated as the city mayor of Warsaw, in spite of representing only a fraction of the population of the city. The city was becoming increasingly unmanageable, especially after the administrative reform of Poland in 1999 which further complicated the local government structure of Warsaw. In 2002, the new Warsaw Act of the Polish parliament restored Warsaw as a single urban gmina with the status of a city with powiat rights, led by a unified local government. At the same time, a significant reform was implemented in all Polish municipal governments, introducing direct elections of the wójt/town mayor/city mayor in all Polish gminas. The first city mayor of Warsaw elected according to these rules was Lech Kaczyński, who however resigned ahead of term when he was elected President of Polish Republic in 2005.

Warsaw has thereafter remained an urban gmina with the status of a city with powiat rights. Legislative power in Warsaw is vested in a unicameral Warsaw City Council (Rada Miasta), which comprises 60 members. Council members are elected directly every five years (since 2018 election). Like most legislative bodies, the city council divides itself into committees which have the oversight of various functions of the city government. The city mayor exercises the executive power in the city, being the superior of all unelected municipal officials and other employees and supervising all subsidiary entities of the city.

The incumbent city mayor of Warsaw is Rafał Trzaskowski.

== Elections ==
=== 2024 ===
Candidate	List and party		Votes	%	+/–
Rafał Trzaskowski	Civic Coalition	Civic Platform	444,006	57.41	+0.74
Tobiasz Bocheński	Law and Justice	Independent	178,652	23.10	New
Magdalena Biejat	The Left (Note: Supported by The City Is Ours.)	Together	99,442	12.86	New
Przemysław Wipler	Confederation	New Hope	34,389	4.45	New
Janusz Korwin-Mikke	Nonpartisans	Confederation	10,839	1.40	+0.11
Romuald Starosielec	Repair Poland Movement	Independent	6,019	0.78	New
Total			773,347	100.00	–
Valid votes			773,347	99.29	
Invalid/blank votes			5,540	0.71	
Total votes			778,887	100.00	
Registered voters/turnout			1,322,897	58.88	
Source: PKW

=== 2018 ===
Candidate	Party	Votes	%
Rafał Trzaskowski	Platform.Modern Civic Coalition (PO)	505,187	56.67
Patryk Jaki	Law and Justice (SP)	254,324	28.53
Jan Śpiewak	Committee of Jan Śpiewak - Warsaw Will Win (Ind.)	26,689	2.99
Marek Jakubiak	Kukiz'15 (Ind.)	26,660	2.99
Justyna Glusman	The City Is Ours – City Movements (Ind.)	20,643	2.32
Andrzej Rozenek	SLD Left Together (SLD)	13,370	1.50
Janusz Korwin-Mikke	Liberty in Local Governments	11,516	1.29
Jacek Wojciechowicz	Committee of Jacek Wojciechowicz Action Warsaw	9,002	1.01
Piotr Ikonowicz	Social Justice Movement of Piotr Ikonowicz	7,271	0.82
Sławomir Antonik	Nonpartisan Local Government Activists (Ind.)	6,457	0.72
Paweł Tanajno	Unjam Warsaw. RiGCz. Tanajno. Hawaiian+	3,745	0.42
Jakub Stefaniak	Polish People's Party	2,793	0.31
Jan Zbigniew Potocki	Second Republic of Poland	2,117	0.24
Krystyna Krzekotowska	World Congress of Poles (Ind.)	1,604	0.18
Total		891,378	100.00
Source: National Electoral Commission

=== 2014 ===
Candidate	Party	First round		Second round	
Candidate	Party	Votes	%	Votes	%
Hanna Gronkiewicz-Waltz	Civic Platform	294,434	47.19	342,857	58.64
Jacek Sasin	Law and Justice	172,887	27.71	241,790	41.36
Piotr Guział	Warsaw Self-Government Community (Ind.)	53,261	8.54		
Przemysław Wipler	New Right of Janusz Korwin-Mikke	26,249	4.21		
Sebastian Wierzbicki	SLD Left Together (SLD)	25,817	4.14		
Joanna Erbel	The Greens (Ind.)	15,030	2.41		
Andrzej Rozenek	Committee of Andrzej Rozenek	14,223	2.28		
Mariusz Dzierżawski	Warsaw for Family (Ind.)	9,768	1.57		
Agata Nosal-Ikonowicz	Social Justice Movement – Piotr Ikonowicz	6,951	1.11		
Zbigniew Wrzesiński	Community Patrotism Solidarity	2,808	0.45		
Andrzej Gorayski	Direct Democracy	2,454	0.39		
Total		623,882	100.00	584,647	100.00
Source: National Electoral Commission

=== 2010 ===
Candidate	Party	Votes	%
Hanna Gronkiewicz-Waltz	Civic Platform	345,737	53.67
Czesław Bielecki	Law and Justice (Ind.)	149,200	23.16
Wojciech Olejniczak	Democratic Left Alliance	85,889	13.33
Janusz Korwin-Mikke	Movement of Voters of Janusz Korwin-Mikke (Ind.)	25,153	3.90
Romuald Szeremietiew	Committee of Romuald Szeremietiew (Ind.)	13,921	2.16
Katarzyna Munio	Warsaw Self-Government Community	11,465	1.78
Waldemar Fydrych	Gawks and Gnomes (Ind.)	4,952	0.77
Danuta Bodzek	Polish People's Party	3,329	0.52
Piotr Strzembosz	Real Politics Union (PR)	2,774	0.43
Piotr Skulski	Patriotic Poland (Ind.)	1,155	0.18
Cezary Stachoń	Better Poland	624	0.10
Total		644,199	100.00
Source: National Electoral Commission

=== 2006 ===
Candidate	Party	First round		Second round	
Candidate	Party	Votes	%	Votes	%
Kazimierz Marcinkiewicz	Law and Justice	272,050	38.67	329,309	46.82
Hanna Gronkiewicz-Waltz	Civic Platform	242,519	34.47	374,104	53.18
Marek Borowski	SLD+SDPL+PD+UP Left and Democrats (SDPL)	159,043	22.61		
Janusz Korwin-Mikke	Real Politics Union	15,951	2.27		
Włodzimierz Całka	Warsaw Self-Government Agreement Our City (Ind.)	4,330	0.62		
Waldemar Fydrych	Gawks and Gnomes (Ind.)	2,914	0.41		
Wojciech Wierzejski	League of Polish Families	2,439	0.35		
Wanda Nowicka	Polish Labour Party (Ind.)	1,927	0.27		
Jerzy Krzekotowski	Our Warsaw and Masovia (Ind.)	1,286	0.18		
Marek Czarnecki	Self-Defence of the Republic of Poland	1,096	0.16		
Total		703,555	100.00	703,413	100.00
Source: National Electoral Commission

=== 2002 ===
Candidate	Party	First round		Second round	
Candidate	Party	Votes	%	Votes	%
Lech Kaczyński	Law and Justice	265,994	49.58	335,262	70.54
Marek Balicki	Democratic Left Alliance – Labour Union	117,227	21.85	140,015	29.46
Andrzej Olechowski	Civic Platform	72,282	13.47		
Julia Pitera	Committee of Julia Pitera	32,009	5.97		
Zbigniew Bujak	Union for Warsaw	14,506	2.70		
Jan Maria Jackowski	League of Polish Families	11,571	2.16		
Henryk Dzido	Self-Defense of the Republic of Poland	9,386	1.75		
Antoni Macierewicz	Together for Poland	5,849	1.09		
Janusz Piechociński	Self-Government Center Our Capital	2,562	0.48		
Waldemar Fydrych	More Cheerful and Competent Warsaw	2,088	0.39		
Józef Janik	Confederation Defence of the Unemployed Movement RP	1,078	0.20		
Jerzy Krzekotowski	Committee of Jerzy Krzekotowski "Warsaw, Law and Home"	787	0.15		
Mirosław Bojańczyk	Better Future	625	0.12		
Lech Jęczmyk	Our Self-Government	575	0.11		
Total		536,539	100.00	475,277	100.00
Source: National Electoral Commission

== List of city mayors ==
Polish–Lithuanian Commonwealth, Before 1792)

- Alexander Chalmers (1702–1703)
- Józef Benedykt Loupia (1724–1727)
- Henryk Makin (1728)
- Józef Benedykt Loupia (1734)
- Mateusz Kostrzewski (1743)
- Paweł Andrychowicz (1750–1751)
- Paweł Andrychowicz (1753)
- Jan Feliks Dulfus (1754–1756)
- Michał Sakres (1761)
- Jan Feliks Dulfus (1764)
- Michał Sakres (1765–1766)
- Jan Feliks Dulfus (1767)
- Michał Sakres (1768)
- Franciszek Witthoff (1769–1771)
- Grzegorz Łyszkiewicz (1772)
- Wojciech Lobert (1773–1776)
- Jakub Maraszewski (1777)
- Franciszek Witthoff (1778–1779)
- Grzegorz Łyszkiewicz (1780–1780)
- Wojciech Lobert (1781–1788)
- Jan Dekert (23 February 1789 – 4 October 1790)
- Józef Michał Łukasiewicz (1791 – 13 April 1792)
- Ignacy Zakrzewski-Wyssogota (16 April 1792 – 25 August 1792)
- Józef Michał Łukasiewicz (30 August 1792 – 20 March 1793)
- Andrzej Rafałowicz (21 March 1793 – 17 April 1794)

=== Kościuszko Uprising ===
- Andrzej Rafałowicz (21 March 1793 – 17 April 1794)
- Ignacy Zakrzewski-Wyssogota (17 April 1794 – 3 November 1794).
- Józef Michał Łukasiewicz (20 November 1794 – 25 July 1796).

=== Prussian occupation (1795–1806) ===
- Franz Schimmelpfennig von der Ove (25 July 1796 – 23 April 1799)
- Friedrich Georg Tilly (23 April 1799 – 27 November 1806)

=== Duchy of Warsaw (1807–1815) ===
- Joachim Moszyński (December 1806 – 21 February 1807)
- Paweł Bieliński (17 April 1807 – 4 July 1807)
- Stanisław Węgrzecki (4 July 1807 – December 1815)

=== Congress Poland (1816–1915) ===
- Karol Woyda (6 January 1816 – 30 November 1830)
- Stanisław Węgrzecki (30 November 1830 – 26 June 1831)
- Jakub Ignacy Łaszczyński (17 June 1831 – 1837)
- Aleksander Graybner (1837 – 9 November 1847)
- Teodor Andrault de Langeron (10 November 1847 – February 1862)
- Kazimierz Woyda (luty 1862 – 15 August 1862)
- Zygmunt Wielopolski (16 August 1862 – 18 September 1863)
- Kalikst Witkowski (16 September 1863 – 1 October 1875)
- Sokrates Starynkiewicz (18 November 1875 – 6 October 1892)
- Nikolai Bibikov (6 October 1892 – 29 June 1906)
- Wiktor Litwiński (July 1906 – 26 April 1909)
- Aleksander Miller (4 September 1909 – 4 August 1915)

=== World War I and German occupation (1916/1917) ===
- Zdzisław Lubomirski (5 August 1916 – 6 October 1917)

=== Republic of Poland (Second Polish Republic, 1918–1939) ===
- Piotr Drzewiecki (28 November 1921 – 7 December 1921)
- Stanisław Nowodworski (7 December 1921 – 22 June 1922)
- Władysław Jabłoński 22 June 1922 – 7 July 1927
- Zygmunt Słomiński (7 July 1927 – 2 March 1934)
- Marian Zyndram-Kościałkowski (2 March – 28 June 1934)
- Stefan Starzyński (2 August 1934 – 27 October 1939)

=== General Government under German occupation (1939–1944) ===
- Julian Kulski (28 October 1939 – 1 August 1944)
- Marceli Porowski (5 August 1944 – 2 October 1944)
- Helmut Otto German Nazi Reich commissioned mayor (October 1939)
- Oskar Rudolf Dengel German Nazi Reich commissioned mayor (5 November 1939 – 20 March 1940)
- Ludwig Leist German Nazi plenipotentiary of Governor of the Warsaw District, since October 1941, Mayor of Warsaw. It should be clarified that the last three mentioned were appointed by the Germans during their occupation of Poland.

=== People's Republic of Poland (1945–1989) ===
Between 1950 and 1973 the highest representative of the government in Warsaw was named the "Head of the Presidium of the National Council of the Capital City of Warsaw" (Przewodniczący Prezydium Rady Narodowej miasta stołecznego Warszawy).

- Marian Spychalski (18 September 1944 – March 1945)
- Stanisław Tołwiński (5 March 1945 – 23 May 1950)
- Jerzy Albrecht (23 May 1950 – 14 May 1956)
- Janusz Zarzycki (14 May 1956 – 17 December 1956)
- Zygmunt Dworakowski (17 December 1956 – 5 May 1960)
- Janusz Zarzycki (5 May 1960 – 29 December 1967)
- Jerzy Majewski (29 December 1967 – 9 December 1973)
- Jerzy Majewski (13 December 1973 – 18 February 1982)
- Mieczysław Dębicki (18 February 1982 – 31 July 1986)
- Jerzy Bolesławski (1 August 1986 – 30 January 1990)

=== Republic of Poland (since 1990) ===
- Stanisław Wyganowski (30 January 1990 – 5 October 1994)
- Mieczysław Bareja (5 October 1994 – 3 November 1994)
- Marcin Swiecicki (3 November 1994 – 30 March 1999)
- Paweł Piskorski (30 March 1999 – 14 January 2002)
- Wojciech Kozak (14 January 2002 – 18 November 2002)
- Lech Kaczyński (18 November 2002 – 22 December 2005)
- vacant (22 December 2005 – 9 February 2006)
- Mirosław Kochalski (Acting; 9 February 2006 – 18 July 2006)
- Kazimierz Marcinkiewicz (Acting; 18 July 2006 – 2 December 2006)
- Hanna Gronkiewicz-Waltz (2 December 2006 – 22 November 2018)
- Rafał Trzaskowski (since 22 November 2018)

== See also ==
- History of Warsaw
- Timeline of Warsaw
