= Kazimierz Woyda =

Polish politician

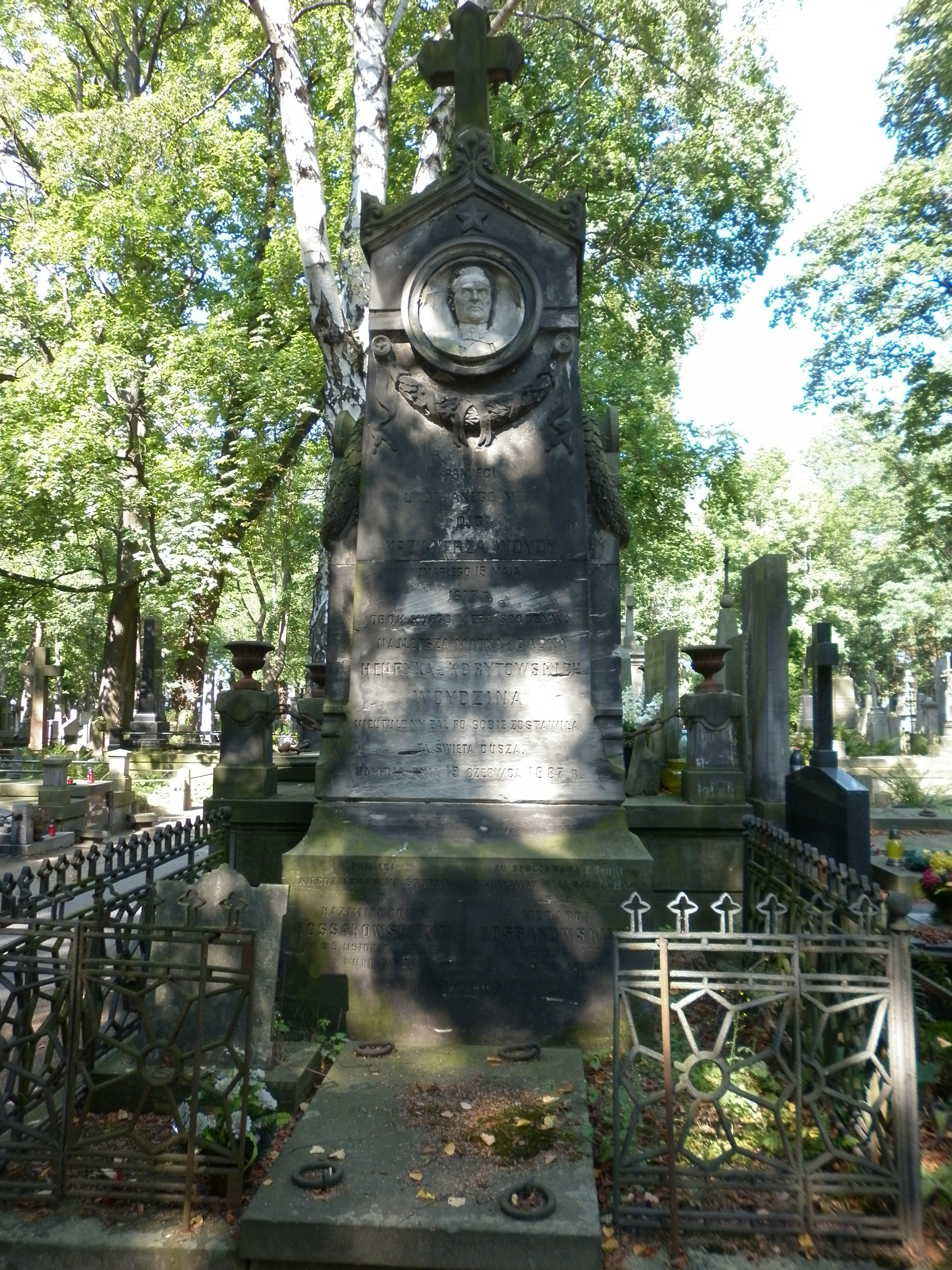
Grave of Kazimierz Woyda in Warsaw

Kazimierz Woyda (1812 – 15 May 1877) was the President of Warsaw, succeeding his father Karol Fryderyk Woyda.
