= Mazowiecki cabinet =

Cabinet of Tadeusz Mazowiecki
- 1st Cabinet of Poland
- 1989–1991
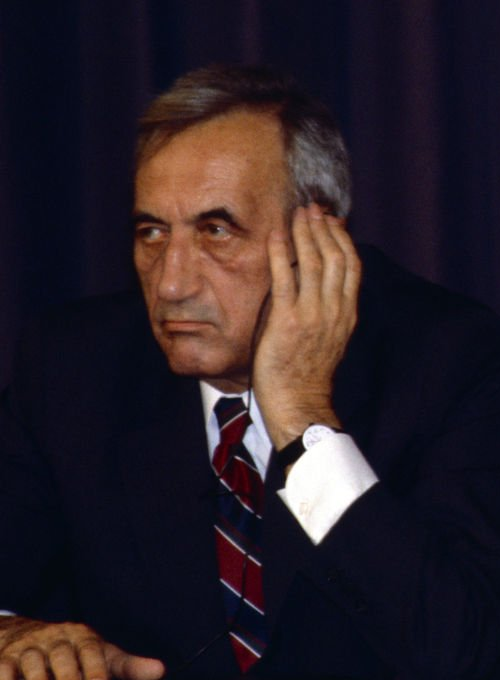
- Mazowiecki in September 1990
- Date formed: 12 September 1989
- Date dissolved: 12 January 1991

People and organisations
- President: Wojciech Jaruzelski until 22 December 1990 Lech Wałęsa from 22 December 1990
- Prime Minister: Tadeusz Mazowiecki
- Prime Minister's history: 1989–1991
- Deputy Prime Minister: Leszek Balcerowicz Jan Janowski Czesław Kiszczak (until 1990) Czesław Janicki (until 1990)
- No. of ministers: 25
- Member party: At beginning; Solidarity Citizens' Committee; United People's Party; Polish United Workers' Party; Democratic Party; At end; Solidarity Citizens' Committee; Democratic Union; Polish People's Party; Democratic Party; Citizens' Movement for Democratic Action; Forum of the Democratic Right
- Status in legislature: Supermajority grand coalition (National unity) (1989–1990) Majority coalition (1990–1991)

History
- Election: 1989 Polish parliamentary election
- Legislature term: Contract Sejm and 1st Senate (1989–1991)
- Predecessor: Rakowski (Communist regime) Szczepanik II (Government-in-exile)
- Successor: Bielecki

The Cabinet of Tadeusz Mazowiecki, led by Prime Minister Tadeusz Mazowiecki, came to power following the 1989 legislative election. He was nominated by the President as the Prime Minister on 24 August 1989 in order to form a new government after the Sejm rejected the Communist cabinet of Czesław Kiszczak, and subsequently obtained the mandatory motion of confidence in the Sejm on 12 September 1989. The cabinet resigned on 25 November 1990, and the Sejm accepted the resignation of the cabinet on 14 December, though it continued to perform its duties until the formation of the Cabinet of Jan Krzysztof Bielecki on 4 January 1991.

With a majority of ministers endorsed by the Solidarity trade union, it was the first government in Poland and anywhere in Eastern Europe since the late 1940s not to be dominated by Communists and fellow travelers.

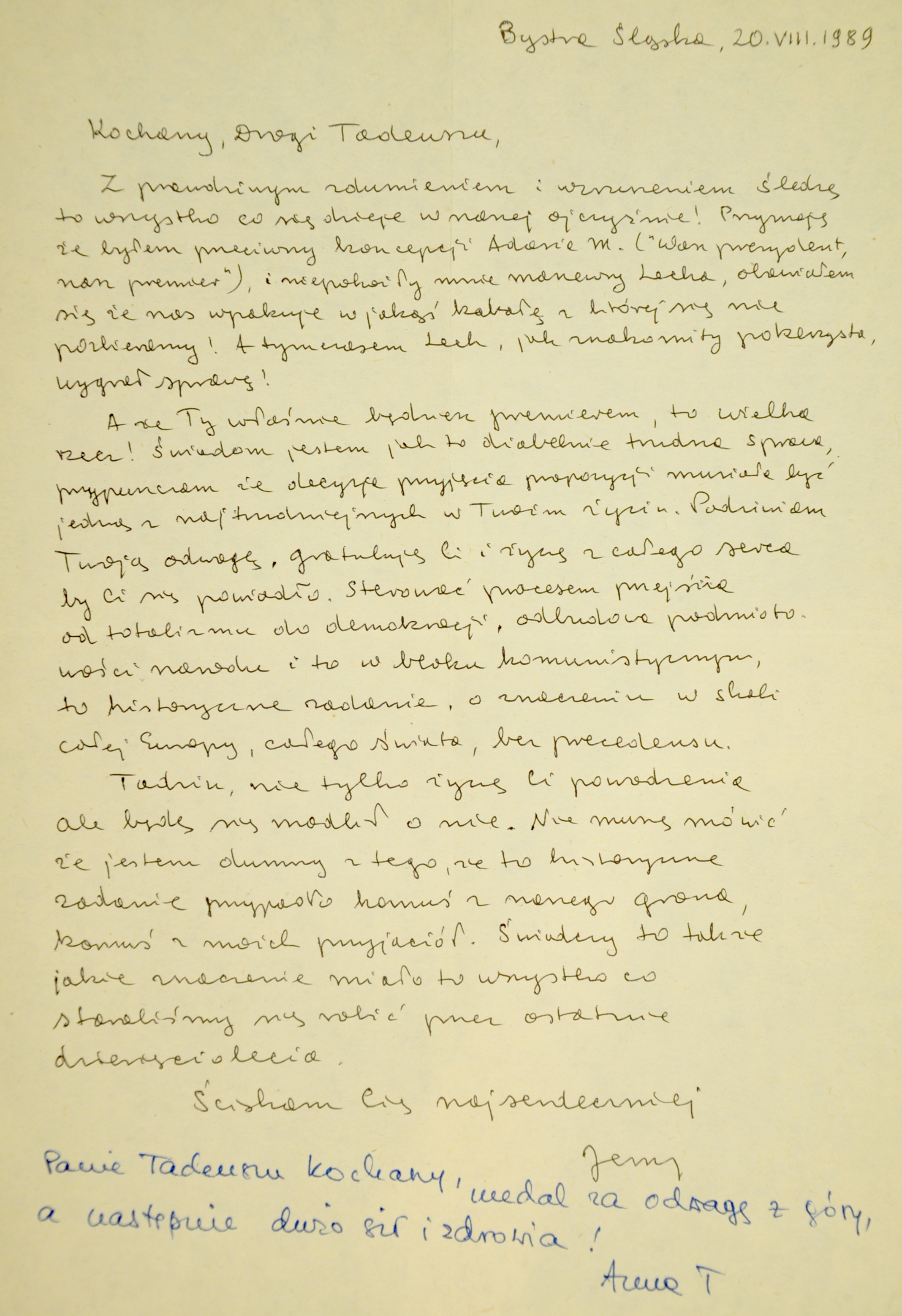
Letter of congratulation to former Polish Prime Minister Tadeusz Mazowiecki.

== Origins ==
The Polish Round Table Agreement, signed in April 1989 between the representatives of the ruling Communist PZPR and the opposition Solidarity trade union, did not initially provide for a government led by Solidarity. Only around 35% of the Sejm would be up for free election alongside the entire Senate, giving the Communist-dominated PRON alliance a seemingly guaranteed majority to form a government.

However, in the resulting elections in June, Solidarity-backed candidates won every seat up for election in the Sejm and all but one seat in the Senate. This victory accelerated the dissolution of the Communist coalition. In a July article entitled "Your President, Our Prime Minister," leading Solidarity member Adam Michnik proposed a grand coalition between Solidarity and reformist elements in the regime, in exchange for the former's support for the election of Communist leader Wojciech Jaruzelski as President.

Jaruzelski was elected president on 19 July, and designated Interior Minister Gen. Czesław Kiszczak to lead the government, with the intention of giving Solidarity a few token positions. However, Solidarity leader Lech Wałęsa entered into negotiations with the PZPR's longtime satellite parties, the Democratic Party and United People's Party, many of whose members were in debt to Solidarity for endorsing them in the second election round. On 17 August 1989, Wałęsa, Roman Malinowski and Jerzy Jóźwiak announced that Solidarity had formed a coalition with the ZSL and SD, commanding a majority in the Sejm. This denied Kiszczak the chance to form a government, and he resigned.

President Jaruzelski then agreed to appoint a Solidarity member as Prime Minister. Wałęsa proposed Tadeusz Mazowiecki, Bronisław Geremek and Jacek Kuroń as potential candidates, and the coalition partners agreed on the first of the three. Jaruzelski designed Mazowiecki as Prime Minister on 19 August, and the latter was elected by the Sejm on 24 August. The Cabinet was confirmed on 12 September by 402 votes in favor to none against, with 13 abstentions. It was the first government anywhere in Eastern Europe since 1948 with a non-Communist majority, and its appointment was a milestone in the Fall of Communism elsewhere in the region.

== Cabinet ==
Cabinet members
| Office | Minister | Party at start | Party at end | Term start | Term end |
|---|---|---|---|---|---|
| Prime Minister | Tadeusz Mazowiecki | Independent (KO "S") | UD | 24 August 1989 | 4 January 1991 |
| Deputy Prime Minister Minister of Finance | Leszek Balcerowicz | Independent (KO "S") | | 12 September 1989 | 12 January 1991 |
| Minister of Agriculture, Food, and Economy | Czesław Janicki (Deputy Prime Minister) | ZSL | PSL | 12 September 1989 | 6 July 1990 |
| Minister of Agriculture, Food, and Economy | Mieczysław Stelmach (acting) | Independent | | 6 July 1990 | 14 September 1990 |
| Minister of Agriculture, Food, and Economy | Janusz Byliński | Independent (KO "S") | | 14 September 1990 | 12 January 1991 |
| Deputy Prime Minister Minister - Head of the Office of Scientific and Technical Progress and Implementation | Jan Janowski | SD | | 12 September 1989 | 12 January 1991 |
| Minister of the Interior | Czesław Kiszczak (Deputy Prime Minister) | PZPR | Independent | 12 September 1989 | 6 July 1990 |
| Minister of the Interior | Krzysztof Kozłowski | Independent (KO "S") | | 6 July 1990 | 12 January 1991 |
| Minister of Foreign Affairs | Krzysztof Skubiszewski | Independent | | 12 September 1989 | 12 January 1991 |
| Minister of National Defence | Florian Siwicki | PZPR | Independent | 12 September 1989 | 6 July 1990 |
| Minister of National Defence | Piotr Kołodziejczyk | Independent | | 6 July 1990 | 12 January 1991 |
| Minister-Head of the Office of the Council of Ministers | Jacek Ambrosiak | Independent (KO "S") | UD | 12 September 1989 | 12 January 1991 |
| Minister without portfolio | Artur Balazs | Independent (KO "S") | | 12 September 1989 | 12 January 1991 |
| Minister of Justice | Aleksander Bentkowski | ZSL | PSL | 12 September 1989 | 12 January 1991 |
| Minister of Culture and Art | Izabella Cywińska | Independent (KO "S") | | 12 September 1989 | 12 January 1991 |
| Minister, member of the Cabinet (for work with political organizations and associations) | Aleksander Hall | Independent (KO "S") | FPD | 12 September 1989 | 12 January 1991 |
| Minister of Environment and Natural Resources | Bronisław Kamiński | ZSL | PSL | 12 September 1989 | 12 January 1991 |
| Minister of Health and Social Welfare | Andrzej Kosiniak-Kamysz | ZSL | PSL | 12 September 1989 | 12 January 1991 |
| Minister of Communications (without portfolio to 20 December 1989) | Marek Kucharski | SD | | 12 September 1989 | 14 September 1990 |
| Minister of Communications (without portfolio to 20 December 1989) | Jerzy Ślęzak | SD | | 14 September 1990 | 12 January 1991 |
| Minister of Labour and Social Policy | Jacek Kuroń | Independent (KO "S") | ROAD | 12 September 1989 | 12 January 1991 |
| Minister of Internal Market | Aleksander Mackiewicz | SD | | 12 September 1989 | 12 January 1991 |
| Minister-Head of the Central Planning Office | Jerzy Osiatyński | Independent (KO "S") | ROAD | 12 September 1989 | 12 January 1991 |
| Minister of Planning and Construction | Aleksander Paszyński | Independent (KO "S") | UD | 12 September 1989 | 12 January 1991 |
| Minister of Education | Henryk Samsonowicz | Independent (KO "S") | | 12 September 1989 | 12 January 1991 |
| Minister of Industry | Tadeusz Syryjczyk | Independent (KO "S") | FPD | 12 September 1989 | 12 January 1991 |
| Minister of Economic Cooperation with Abroad | Marcin Święcicki | PZPR | UD | 12 September 1989 | 12 January 1991 |
| Minister without portfolio | Witold Trzeciakowski | Independent (KO "S") | UD | 12 September 1989 | 12 January 1991 |
| Minister of Transportation and Marine Economy | Franciszek Wielądek | PZPR | SdRP | 12 September 1989 | 6 July 1990 |
| Minister of Transportation and Marine Economy | Ewaryst Waligórski | Independent (KO "S") | | 6 July 1990 | 12 January 1991 |
| Minister of Privatization | Waldemar Kuczyński | Independent (KO "S") | | 12 September 1989 | 12 January 1991 |

Małgorzata Niezabitowska served as government spokesman.

== Party breakdown ==
=== At beginning ===
- Solidarity Citizens' Committee
13
- United People's Party
4
- Polish United Workers' Party
4
- Democratic Party
3
- Independent
1

=== At end ===
- Solidarity Citizens' Committee
8
- Democratic Union
5
- Polish People's Party
3
- Democratic Party
3
- Citizens' Movement for
  Democratic Action
2
- Forum of the
  Democratic Right
2
- Independent
2

== Vote of confidence ==
Election of Tadeusz Mazowiecki as Prime Minister of Poland
| Ballot → | 24 August 1989 |
| Required majority → | 212 out of 423 |
| Votes in favour | 378 / 423 |
| Votes against | 4 / 423 |
| Abstentions | 41 / 423 |

Vote of confidence in the Cabinet of Tadeusz Mazowiecki
| Ballot → | 12 September 1989 |
| Required majority → | 208 out of 415 |
| Votes in favour | 402 / 415 |
| Abstentions | 13 / 415 |

== Changes in Composition ==
- December 20, 1989
    - Minister for Agriculture, Food and Forestry Czesław Janicki took office as minister of agriculture and food industries.
    - Minister of Environment and Natural Resources Bronisław Kamiński took office as minister of environmental protection, natural resources and forestry.
    - Minister of Transport, shipping and communications Franciszek Wielądek took office as Minister of Transport and Maritime Affairs.
    - Minister for the organization of the Ministry of Communications Marek Kucharski took office as minister of communications.
- January 1990
  - Transformation of the Ministry of Environment and natural resources in the department of environmental protection, natural resources and forestry.
- July 6, 1990
  - Dismissed:
    - Deputy Prime Minister, Minister of Agriculture and Food Czesław Janicki.
    - Deputy Interior Minister Czesław Kiszczak.
    - Defense minister Florian Siwicki.
    - Minister of Transport and Maritime Affairs Franciszek Wielądek.
  - Appointed:
    - Krzysztof Kozłowski for the office of Interior Minister.
    - Piotr Kołodziejczyk at the office of minister of national defense.
    - Ewaryst Waligórski for the office of Minister of Transport and Maritime Affairs.
- July 13, 1990
  - Ministry of Privatization created.
- September 14, 1990
  - Dismissed:
    - Communications Minister Marek Kucharski.
  - Appointed:
    - Jerzy Slezak for the office of minister of communications.
    - Janusz Byliński for the office of minister of agriculture and food industries.
    - Waldemar Kuczyński (Solidarity) in the office of the minister of privatization.
