= 1995 Polish presidential election =

- 5 November 1995 (first round); 19 November 1995 (second round)
- Turnout: 64.70% (first round) ▲4.07pp 68.23% (second round) ▲14.83pp
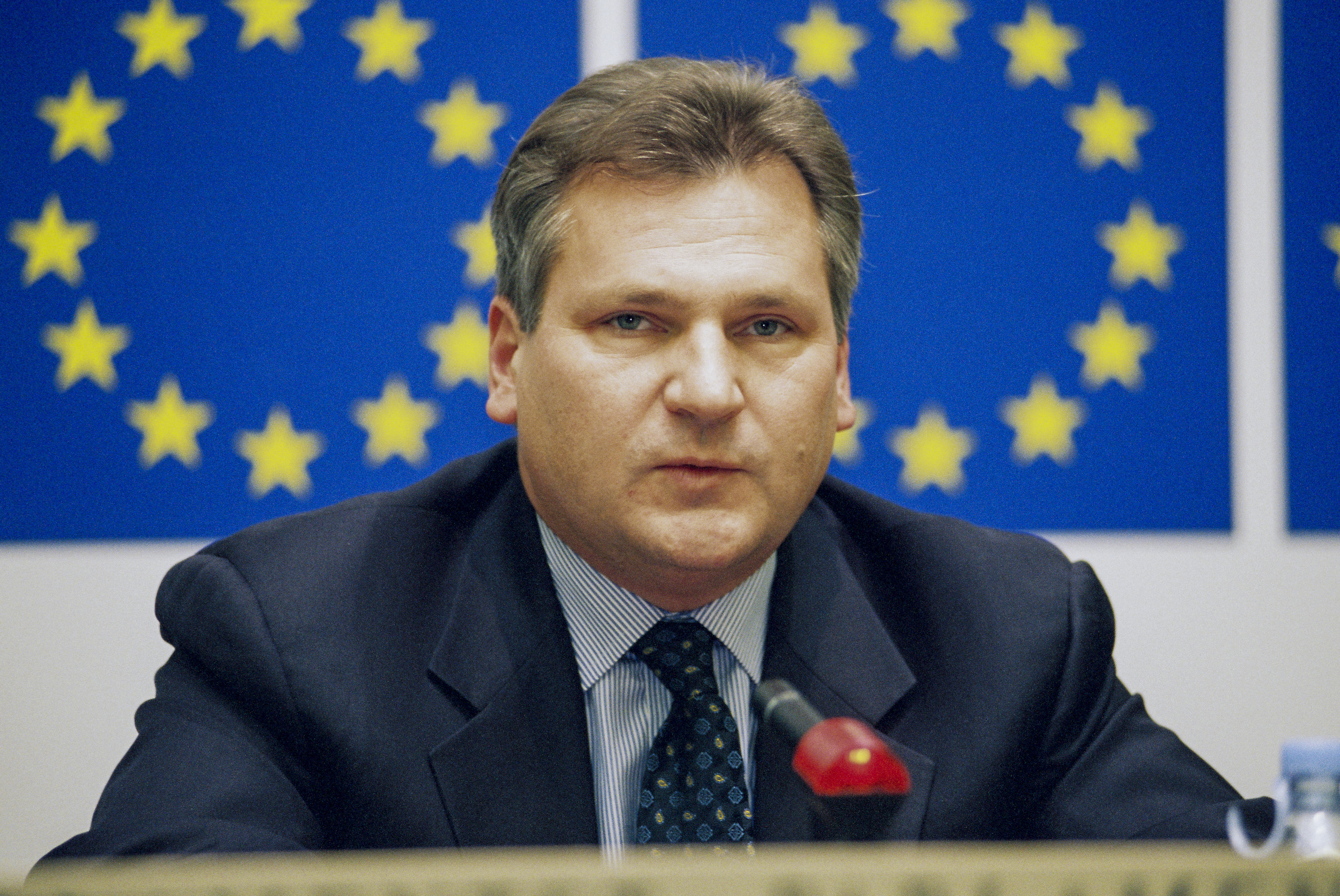

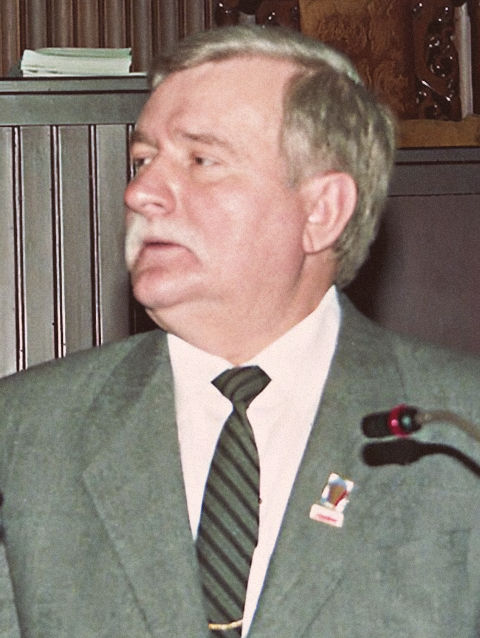
Nominee	Aleksander Kwaśniewski	Lech Wałęsa
Party	SdRP	Independent (Note: The President of Poland traditionally resigns from party membership after taking office. Although Wałęsa was officially an independent, his campaign was endorsed and funded by the Nonpartisan Bloc for Support of Reforms and National Democratic Party.)
Popular vote	9,704,439	9,058,176
Percentage	51.72%	48.28%
President before election
Lech Wałęsa
Independent
Elected President
Aleksander Kwaśniewski
SdRP

Presidential elections were held in Poland on 5 November 1995, with a second round on 19 November. The leader of Social Democracy, Aleksander Kwaśniewski, and incumbent president Lech Wałęsa advanced to the second round. Kwaśniewski won the election with 52% of the vote in the run-off against 48% for Wałęsa.

== Background ==
=== Wałęsa's inauguration ===
Lech Wałęsa was elected and sworn in as President in December 1990, succeeding Wojciech Jaruzelski and leading to the ultimate end of communist rule in Poland. Soon after his inauguration, Wałęsa's presently primary rival Prime Minister Tadeusz Mazowiecki resigned and was followed by Jan Krzysztof Bielecki, a liberal and economist relatively loyal to Wałęsa. Regardless of the cabinet changes, Bielecki's time as prime minister would largely follow the course set by his predecessor.

=== 1991 parliamentary election ===
The 1991 Polish parliamentary election saw the Democratic Union (UD) become the largest party, later supplanted by the Democratic Left Alliance (SLD) after Aleksander Hall's Conservatives split off from UD. After the downfall of Jan Olszewski's cabinet, and Hanna Suchocka's cabinet which succeeded it, new elections were called.

=== 1993 parliamentary election ===
The 1993 Polish parliamentary election saw SLD become the largest party, winning a plurality with 171 seats — 37.2% of the 460-seat Sejm — while receiving only 20.4% of the vote. SLD governed in a coalition with the Polish People's Party.

=== Approval rating of Wałęsa ===
Graphical summary of approval polls

Wałęsa maintained an overwhelmingly negative approval rating throughout the second half of his term, with his approval becoming positive only during a period of increased polarization before the second turn of the 1995 presidential election.

== Candidate selection ==
=== Registered candidates ===
Name	Born	Last position/job	Party	Endorsed by
Aleksander Kwaśniewski	15 November 1954 (40); Białogard, Koszalin Voivodeship	Member of the Sejm (1989–1995); Chairman of Social Democracy (1990–1995)	Social Democracy	Democratic Left Alliance: Social Democracy; All-Poland Alliance of Trade Unions; Working People's Movement
Lech Wałęsa	29 September 1943 (52); Popowo, General Government	President of Poland (1990–1995)	Independent	Nonpartisan Bloc for Support of Reforms
Lech Wałęsa	29 September 1943 (52); Popowo, General Government	President of Poland (1990–1995)	Independent	Confederation of Independent Poland
Lech Wałęsa	29 September 1943 (52); Popowo, General Government	President of Poland (1990–1995)	Independent	Party of Christian Democrats
Lech Wałęsa	29 September 1943 (52); Popowo, General Government	President of Poland (1990–1995)	Independent	Republicans Party
Lech Wałęsa	29 September 1943 (52); Popowo, General Government	President of Poland (1990–1995)	Independent	Polish People's Party – Peasants' Agreement
Lech Wałęsa	29 September 1943 (52); Popowo, General Government	President of Poland (1990–1995)	Independent	Movement for the Republic – Patriotic Camp
Lech Wałęsa	29 September 1943 (52); Popowo, General Government	President of Poland (1990–1995)	Independent	Solidarity
Lech Wałęsa	29 September 1943 (52); Popowo, General Government	President of Poland (1990–1995)	Independent	Party of Polish Democracy
Lech Wałęsa	29 September 1943 (52); Popowo, General Government	President of Poland (1990–1995)	Independent	National-Democratic Party
Lech Wałęsa	29 September 1943 (52); Popowo, General Government	President of Poland (1990–1995)	Independent	Christian National Union
Jacek Kuroń	3 March 1934 (61); Lwów, Lwów Voivodeship	Minister of Labour and Social Policy (1989–1991, 1992–1993); Member of the Sejm (1989–1993)	Freedom Union	
Jan Olszewski	20 August 1930 (65); Warsaw, Warsaw Voivodeship	Prime Minister (1991–1992); Member of the Sejm (1991–1993)	Movement for the Republic	Polish Party "Patrimony"
Jan Olszewski	20 August 1930 (65); Warsaw, Warsaw Voivodeship	Prime Minister (1991–1992); Member of the Sejm (1991–1993)	Movement for the Republic	Centre Agreement
Jan Olszewski	20 August 1930 (65); Warsaw, Warsaw Voivodeship	Prime Minister (1991–1992); Member of the Sejm (1991–1993)	Movement for the Republic	Christian-National Movement Polish Action
Jan Olszewski	20 August 1930 (65); Warsaw, Warsaw Voivodeship	Prime Minister (1991–1992); Member of the Sejm (1991–1993)	Movement for the Republic	Third Republic Movement
Waldemar Pawlak	5 September 1959 (36); Model, Płock Voivodeship	Prime Minister (1993–1995); Member of the Sejm (1989–2015)	Polish People's Party	
Tadeusz Zieliński	19 June 1926 (69); Kraków, Kraków Voivodeship	Ombudsman in Poland (1992–1996)	Independent	Labour Union
Tadeusz Zieliński	19 June 1926 (69); Kraków, Kraków Voivodeship	Ombudsman in Poland (1992–1996)	Independent	National Party of Retirees and Pensioners
Tadeusz Zieliński	19 June 1926 (69); Kraków, Kraków Voivodeship	Ombudsman in Poland (1992–1996)	Independent	Polish Socialist Party
Tadeusz Zieliński	19 June 1926 (69); Kraków, Kraków Voivodeship	Ombudsman in Poland (1992–1996)	Independent	Polish Socialist Party – WRN
Hanna Gronkiewicz-Waltz	4 November 1952 (43); Warsaw, Warsaw Voivodeship	President of the National Bank (1992–2001)	Independent	Christian-Democratic Labour Party
Hanna Gronkiewicz-Waltz	4 November 1952 (43); Warsaw, Warsaw Voivodeship	President of the National Bank (1992–2001)	Independent	Conservative Coalition
Hanna Gronkiewicz-Waltz	4 November 1952 (43); Warsaw, Warsaw Voivodeship	President of the National Bank (1992–2001)	Independent	Conservative Party
Hanna Gronkiewicz-Waltz	4 November 1952 (43); Warsaw, Warsaw Voivodeship	President of the National Bank (1992–2001)	Independent	Christian-Peasant Party
Hanna Gronkiewicz-Waltz	4 November 1952 (43); Warsaw, Warsaw Voivodeship	President of the National Bank (1992–2001)	Independent	Christian National Union
Hanna Gronkiewicz-Waltz	4 November 1952 (43); Warsaw, Warsaw Voivodeship	President of the National Bank (1992–2001)	Independent	Polish Union
Janusz Korwin-Mikke	27 October 1942 (53); Warsaw, Warsaw Voivodeship	Member of the Sejm (1991–1993)	Real Politics Union	
Andrzej Lepper	13 June 1954 (41); Stowięcino, Słupsk Voivodeship	Agriculturist	Self-Defence Covenant	
Jan Pietrzak	26 April 1937 (58); Warsaw, Warsaw Voivodeship	Satirist	Independent	
Tadeusz Koźluk	16 August 1930 (65); Konstantynów, Lublin Voivodeship	Lawyer	Independent	
Kazimierz Piotrowicz	23 April 1954 (41)	Entrepreneur	Independent	
Leszek Bubel	19 January 1957 (38); Węgrów, Siedlce Voivodeship	Member of the Sejm (1991-1993)	Forum for Fighting Lawlessness	

=== Social Democracy of the Republic of Poland ===
Potential candidates
Aleksander Kwaśniewski	Józef Oleksy
Chairman of Social Democracy (1990-1995)	Prime Minister of Poland (1995-1996)

During SdRP's Congress on 13 May, Kwaśniewski secured his party's endorsement for president with 296 out of 300 votes. Some delegates believed Józef Oleksy should become the candidate instead. A poll conducted in December 1994 suggested 71% of potential SLD voters supported Kwaśniewski as the party's candidate, 7% supported Włodzimierz Cimoszewicz and 16% supported Oleksy.

=== Nonpartisan Bloc for Support of Reforms ===
Lech Wałęsa was endorsed by the Bloc. A sizable part of anti-Wałęsa, reformist activists in the Bloc, like Andrzej Olechowski or Zbigniew Religa split off before the election, the latter forming the Partia Republikanie, which supported Marek Markiewicz after Religa dissented with his party's intention to run himself as its candidate. Markiewicz dropped out and endorsed Wałęsa before the first round of the election. Besides his own party, Wałęsa received the endorsement of other parties: a section of the ZChN endorsed him on 18 September, later joined by the rest of the party (though it didn't revoke its endorsement of their original candidate, Hanna Gronkiewicz-Waltz) on 29 October.

=== Freedom Union ===
Potential candidates
Jacek Kuroń	Janusz Onyszkiewicz	Hanna Suchocka
Minister of Labour and Social Policy (1992-1993)	Minister of National Defence (1992-1993)	Prime Minister of Poland (1992-1993)

During the 2nd Congress of the Freedom Union, three candidates decided to enter the party's candidate selection process: Jacek Kuroń, Janusz Onyszkiewicz and Hanna Suchocka. Suchocka, despite being the highest-ranking of the former three candidates, came last in the first round. The second round of voting saw Kuroń defeat Onyszkiewicz by a slight margin of 11 votes, and the former Minister of Labour became the party's official candidate for president. A poll conducted in December 1994 suggested 53% of potential UW voters supported Kuroń as the party's candidate, 15% supported Leszek Balcerowicz and 25% supported Suchocka.

=== Movement for the Republic and Centre Agreement ===
Potential candidates (Centre Agreement)
Lech Kaczyński	Jan Olszewski	Adam Strzembosz
President of the Supreme Audit Office (1992-1995)	Prime Minister of Poland (1991-1992)	Chairman of the Supreme Court of Poland (1990-1998)

With variously successful attempts of uniting the extraparliamentary right, several possible candidates were presented to lead it in the presidential election, most prominently of those affiliated with the Centre Agreement or its splinters, Lech Kaczyński, Jan Olszewski or Adam Strzembosz. On 27 March, Strzembosz declared his intentions to run for president, gaining the support of conventionally right-wing parties around him - the Centre Agreement, Christian-Peasant Party and Conservative Coalition, as well as the more centrist Conservative Party of Aleksander Hall. Strzembosz, alongside other activists of the right including Jan Olszewski, attempted to legitimise his candidacy at the Convent of St. Catherine. After its collapse in July, Jan Olszewski started an individual presidential campaign under his party, the Movement for the Republic, who the PC considered supporting instead of Strzembosz due to dissatisfaction with him sidelining the party's staffers and platform, especially its tough on crime positions. However, on 4 September the party chose to proclaim Lech Kaczyński as their nominee instead. After failure to gain much support, Strzembosz abandoned his candidacy on 16 September, endorsing Hanna Gronkiewicz-Waltz, one of the pretendents at the Convent of St. Catherine. Both Kaczyński and Olszewski also attempted to court the endorsement of the Solidarity trade union from Wałęsa, but failed, as the union endorsed the incumbent president on 18 October. Similarly to many other of the right's candidates, Kaczyński dropped out of the race on 30 October due to his poor performance and endorsed Olszewski. A poll conducted in December 1994 suggested 13% of potential voters for the extraparliamentary right supported Olszewski as the party's candidate, 11% supported Kaczyński and 6% supported Strzembosz. Another 9% supported right-libertarian Janusz Korwin-Mikke (UPR) and 8% supported Alicja Grześkowiak (PC).

=== Polish People's Party ===
Potential candidates
Waldemar Pawlak	Józef Zych
Prime Minister (1993-1995)	Marshal of the Sejm (1995-1997)

Pawlak was selected as the party's candidate. He was challenged most prominently by Józef Zych at the party's convention, however, Zych resigned from seeking the candidacy. A poll conducted in December 1994 suggested 68% of potential PSL voters supported Pawlak as the party's candidate, 1% supported Janusz Piechociński and 9% supported Zych.

=== Convent of St. Catherine ===
Potential candidates
Hanna Gronkiewicz-Waltz	Leszek Moczulski	Jan Olszewski	Adam Strzembosz	Henryk Bąk	Wojciech Ziembiński	Roman Ciesielski	Jan Parys
President of the National Bank of Poland (1992-2001)	Member of the Sejm (1993-1997)	Prime Minister of Poland (1991-1992)	Chairman of the Supreme Court of Poland (1990-1998)	Deputy Marshal of the Sejm (1991-1993)	Anti-communist oppositionist	Member of the Senat (1989-1991)	Minister of National Defence (1991-1992)

In November 1994, the Convent of St. Catherine was organised by Józef Maj, coordinating several extraparliamentary center to right-wing parties, like the Christian-Democratic Labour Party (ChDSP), Confederation of Independent Poland, Party of Christian Democrats (PChD), Peasants' Agreement, Polish People's Party (Mikołaczykowskie faction), Movement for the Republic, Third Republic Movement, Party of Polish Democracy, National-Democratic Party, Christian National Union, Polish Union (ZP), Solidarity or Rural Solidarity. The Convent's purpose was to serve as a discussion forum for the marginal extraparliamentary parties trying to coalesce into a political force able to cross the 5% threshold and enter the Sejm after the last election's wipeout result for the fragmented parties. In the Summer of 1995, the Convent agreed to hold meetings to select a joint presidential candidate for that year's election. Out of the many candidates that expressed interest in becoming the candidate, the quickest to withdraw was Jan Parys, soon after Roman Ciesielski, Wojciech Ziembinski, Henryk Bąk and Adam Strzembosz stopped being contenders. The remaining candidates, Hanna Gronkiewicz-Waltz, Leszek Moczulski and Jan Olszewski, ultimately entered a dispute over the results a ballot held to elect the Convent's candidate, as on the 19th of July, Gronkiewicz-Waltz's, followed by Olszewski's supporters both claimed victory for their candidates. Due to the inability of the Convent to decide on a candidate, it was ultimately disbanded and all three of the remaining candidates ran their own presidential campaigns, though Moczulski ultimately withdrew and endorsed Wałęsa. Gronkiewicz-Waltz later tried to court the endorsements of right-wing candidates like Olszewski and Lech Kaczyński. A group of ZChN activists, including Jan Łopuszański and Henryk Goryszewski, titled "Inicjatywa 44", broke away from the Gronkiewicz-Waltz campaign to support Wałęsa instead, being accepted into his campaign staff on 18 September. On 29 October, the rest of ZChN, beyond the Inicjatywa 44 group, endorsed Lech Wałęsa without withdrawing their support for Gronkiewicz-Waltz. Ultimately, she remained with only the concrete endorsements of the SLCh, ZP, PK, KK and ChDSP.

=== Withdrawn candidates ===
Centre Agreement	Republicans Party	Confederation of Independent Poland	Independent
Lech Kaczyński	Marek Markiewicz	Leszek Moczulski	Bogdan Pawłowski
President of the Supreme Audit Office (1992-1995)	Chairman of KRRiT (1993-1994)	Member of the Sejm (1993-1997)	Entrepreneur
Endorsed Jan Olszewski	Endorsed Lech Wałęsa	Endorsed Lech Wałęsa	Endorsed Lech Wałęsa

=== Rejected candidates ===
The following candidates registered to run, but failed to cross the threshold of 100,000 signatures required to run in the election:

- Bolesław Tejkowski (Chairman of the Polish National Community)

== Campaign ==
The two favorites throughout the course of the campaign were the leader of the post-communist SLD Aleksander Kwaśniewski and incumbent president Lech Wałęsa. Kwaśniewski ran a campaign of change and blamed the economic problems in Poland on the post-Solidarity right. His campaign slogan was "Let's choose the future" (Wybierzmy przyszłość). Political opponents challenged his candidacy, and produced evidence to show that he had lied about his education in registration documents and public presentations. There was also some mystery over his graduation from university. A law court confirmed that Kwaśniewski had lied about his record, but did not penalize him for it, judging the information irrelevant to the election result. Meanwhile, Wałęsa was a very unpopular president and some opinion polls even showed that he might not make it into the second round. He was challenged by other post-Solidarity politicians of all sides of the political spectrum ranging from liberal former Minister of Labour and Social Policy Jacek Kuroń to conservative former Prime Minister Jan Olszewski. Rather than focusing on his presidency, he focused on his personal image as an everyday man turned international hero that was created for him while he was chairman of Solidarity. His campaign slogan was "There are many candidates but there is only one Lech Wałęsa" (Kandydatów jest wielu – Lech Wałęsa tylko jeden).

=== Second round candidate endorsements ===
Party	1993 votes	Endorsement
Democratic Left Alliance	20.41%	Aleksander Kwaśniewski
Polish People's Party	15.40%	No endorsement
Freedom Union	14.58% (Note: Aggregate results for Democratic Union (10.59%) and Liberal Democratic Congress (3.99%))	Lech Wałęsa
Labour Union	7.28%	No endorsement
Confederation of Independent Poland	5.77%	Lech Wałęsa
Nonpartisan Bloc for Support of Reforms	5.41%	Lech Wałęsa
German Minority Electoral Committee	0.80%	Lech Wałęsa
Candidate	First round	Endorsement
Jacek Kuroń	9.22%	No endorsement
Jan Olszewski	6.86%	No endorsement
Waldemar Pawlak	4.31%	No endorsement
Tadeusz Zieliński	3.53%	Aleksander Kwaśniewski
Hanna Gronkiewicz-Waltz	2.76%	Lech Wałęsa
Andrzej Lepper	1.32%	Aleksander Kwaśniewski
Lech Kaczyński	Withdrawn	Lech Wałęsa

== Opinion polls ==
=== Graphical summary ===
Graphical summary of the first round opinion polls: A. Kwaśniewski Lech Wałęsa Jacek Kuroń Jan Olszewski Waldemar Pawlak Tadeusz Zieliński H. Gronkiewicz-Waltz J. Korwin-Mikke Andrzej Lepper Jan Pietrzak ~~Leszek Moczulski~~ ~~A. Olechowski~~ ~~Adam Strzembosz~~

=== First round ===
Polling firm/Link	Fieldwork date	Sample size	Kwaśniewski SdRP	Wałęsa IN	Kuroń UW	Olszewski RdR	Pawlak PSL	Zieliński UP	Gronkiewicz-Waltz IN	Korwin-Mikke UPR	Lepper S	Pietrzak IN	Others	Undecideds	Lead
1995 presidential election	Election results	17,872,350	35.11	33.11	9.22	6.86	4.31	3.53	2.76	2.4	1.32	1.12	0.26		2.00
CBOS	26-29 Oct 1995	1,281	32	26	8	4	3	5	3	2	3		2 (Note: Moczulski – 1)	12	6
Demoskop	23-26 Oct 1995	995	26	24	8	4	3	6	5		2				2
Wprost	24 Oct 1995		34	24	11	4	6	7	7						10
CBOS	20-23 Oct 1995	1,311	27	23	8	5	4	5	5	2	1	3	4 (Note: L. Kaczyński – 1, Markiewicz – 1, Moczulski – 1, Refuse to answer – 1)	12	4
CBOS	13-17 Oct 1995	1,167	27	22	7	3	4	6	8	2	1	3	1 (Note: Moczulski – 1)	15	5
Września Primary	15 Oct 1995		48.8	12.7	9.5	3.9	2.0	6.7	4.3	3.6	2.3	2.3	3.9 (Note: Pawłowski – 1.2, Moczulski – 0.7, Kaczyński – 0.4, Koźluk – 0.3, Bubel – 0.1, – 0.1)		36.1
Demoskop	8-12 Oct 1995	996	28	15	15				17						11
CBOS	6-9 Oct 1995	1,126	27	17	6	6	5	10	12	2	0	2	2 (Note: Moczulski – 2)	10	10
OBOP	18 Sep 1995		26	12	8	3	4	11	12				4 (Note: Strzembosz – 2, Tymiński – 2)		14
"Trybuna Śląska" Primary	14 Sep 1995	7,144	35.4	15.2	6.8	3.5	0.7	10.3	14.6	3			10.5 (Note: Moczulski – 3.6, Tymiński – 2.3, Strzembosz – 1.1, "Others" – 2, Invalid – 1.97)		20.2
CBOS	8-11 Sep 1995	968	25	16	9	3	5	8	16	1			7 (Note: Strzembosz – 2, Tymiński – 2, L. Kaczyński – 1)	10	9
Election called by Sejm Marshal Józef Zych (9 September 1995)
CBOS	1-4 Sep 1995	1,150	21	12	8	3	5	11	15			1	13 (Note: Olechowski – 5, Moczulski – 2, Strzembosz – 2, Zych – 2)	12	6
OBOP	28-29 Aug 1995	1,012	19	7	9	3	3	7	14				10 (Note: Strzembosz – 2, Zych – 2)	28	5
Wprost	27 Aug 1995		23	14	10	2	3	11	12						9
CBOS	3-8 Aug 1995	1,081	24	13	9	3	3	9	12			2	15 (Note: Olechowski – 4, Zych – 4, Moczulski – 3, Strzembosz – 3)	10	11
CBOS	7-12 Jul 1995	1,115	23	14	10	2	3	11	12			2	15 (Note: Olechowski – 5, Zych – 4, Strzembosz – 3, Moczulski – 2)	7	9
Demoskop	7-11 Jul 1995	991	32	16	18			11	10						14
OBOP	8-11 Jul 1995	980	23	9	10	2	4	9	12			1.5	14.5 (Note: Zych – 4, Strzembosz – 3, Religa – 2, Moczulski – 1.5, Tymiński – 1.5)	15	11
Wprost	9 Jul 1995		26	11	12	<1	4	11	12						14
OBOP	24 Jun-3 Jul 1995	1,499	24	11	9	2	4	9	9				21 (Note: Olechowski – 4, Zych – 4, Moczulski – 3, Religa – 3, Strzembosz – 3)	11	13
CBOS	23-27 Jun 1995	1,173	24	13	11	2	4	9	12	1			15 (Note: Olechowski – 6, Strzembosz – 4, Zych – 3, Moczulski – 1)	9	11
OBOP	10-13 Jun 1995	1,100	23	11	11	2	3	9	6	2			23 (Note: Olechowski – 6, Religa – 4, Strzembosz – 4, Moczulski – 3, Zych – 3)	10	12
CBOS	8-12 Jun 1995	1,172	25	12	10	3	3	11	11	2			17 (Note: Zych – 6, Strzembosz – 5, Religa – 3, Moczulski – 2)	6	13
Wprost	11 Jun 1995		20	8	15	3	3	15	<1					36	5
CBOS	26–29 May 1995	1,198	26	12	11	2	4	12	4	1			23 (Note: Strzembosz – 7, Zych – 5, Moczulski – 3, Religa – 3)	6	14
OBOP	13–16 May 1995	1,029	24	8	12	2	3	9		2			26 (Note: Strzembosz – 8, Olechowski – 6, Religa – 4, Moczulski – 3, Zych – 2)	14	12
CBOS	5–10 May 1995	1,203	20	8	15	2.5	3	15		1			29.5 (Note: Olechowski – 8, Strzembosz – 8, Oleksy – 7, Krzaklewski – 2, Zych – 2, Gawronik – 0.5)	6	5
OBOP	22-23 Apr 1995	1,069	18	7	14	1	4	10		2			22 (Note: Olechowski – 7, Strzembosz – 7, Moczulski – 1, Zych – 2)	22	4
CBOS	7-11 Apr 1995	1,177	24	11	15	1	5	8		1		3	24 (Note: Olechowski – 8, Strzembosz – 8, Oleksy – 6, Zych – 2)	8	9
Pentor	8-11 Apr 1995	1,004	23	7	25		5	9		3			20 (Note: Olechowski – 10, Strzembosz – 7, Krzaklewski – 3)		2
OBOP	1-4 Apr 1995	1,123	16	7	14		3	6		1			35 (Note: Strzembosz – 8, Olechowski – 4, Oleksy – 4)	19	2
CBOS	30 Mar-3 Apr 1995	1,145	18	7	14	2	3	11		2		3	31 (Note: Strzembosz – 11, Oleksy – 9, Olechowski – 6, Zych – 3, Grześkowiak – 2)	8	4
CBOS	4-6 Mar 1995	1,208	19	13	10	1	3	16					28 (Note: Olechowski – 8, Oleksy – 4, Strzembosz – 4, Suchocka – 4, Cimoszewicz – 3, Moczulski – 3, Onyszkiewicz – 1, Zych – 1)	9	3
OBOP	3-7 Mar 1995	1,086	16	7	9		3	10					36 (Note: Olechowski – 7, Oleksy – 4)	16	6
OBOP	3-7 Mar 1995	1,086	33	15	28		9						15 (Note: Strzembosz – 11, Tymiński – 4)		5
CBOS	3-6 Feb 1995	1,223	16	8	14	2	6	13					27 (Note: Olechowski – 8, Oleksy – 6, Cimoszewicz – 3, Moczulski – 3, Strzembosz – 3, Suchocka – 2, Onyszkiewicz – 1, Zych – 1)	14	2
OBOP	3-6 Feb 1995	1,123	20	10	16		5	13					31 (Note: Olechowski – 9, Religa – 5, Oleksy – 4, Moczulski – 3, Strzembosz – 3, Suchocka – 3, Tymiński – 3, Zych – 1)	5	4
CBOS	6-9 Jan 1995	1,230	14	11	10	1	6	7					26 (Note: Olechowski – 7, Oleksy – 5, Balcerowicz – 4, Strzembosz – 3, Suchocka – 3, Cimoszewicz – 2, Moczulski – 2)	21	3
CBOS	2-6 Dec 1994	1,164	17	13	11	1	8	9					32 (Note: Olechowski – 9, Brzeziński – 5, Suchocka – 5, Balcerowicz – 4, Cimoszewicz – 3, Bugaj – 2, Moczulski – 2, Oleksy – 2)		4
CBOS	3-7 Nov 1994	1,237	17	10	6		10	10					41 (Note: Olechowski – 11, Brzeziński – 6, Moczulski – 5, Oleksy – 4, Suchocka – 4, Balcerowicz – 3, Cimoszewicz – 3, Mazowiecki – 2, Strzembosz – 2, Grześkowiak – 1)		6
CBOS	6-10 Oct 1994	1,184	16	10	6		11	9					42 (Note: Olechowski – 10, Religa – 7, Balcerowicz – 4, Moczulski – 4, Suchocka – 4, Cimoszewicz – 3, Mazowiecki – 3, Oleksy – 3, Strzembosz – 3, Romaszewski – 1)		5
CBOS	2-5 Sep 1994	1,219	19	9	3		12	7					40 (Note: Olechowski – 9, Moczulski – 5, Religa – 5, Cimoszewicz – 4, Skubiszewski – 4, Balcerowicz – 3, Oleksy – 3, Suchocka – 3, Mazowiecki – 2, Strzembosz – 2)		7
OBOP	15-19 Jul 1994	966	28	8	5	2	12	7					32 (Note: Religa – 12, Balcerowicz – 6, Mazowiecki – 5, Moczulski – 4, Krzaklewski – 3, Strzembosz – 2)	6	16
CBOS	17-20 Jun 1994	1,197	19	8	4		12	6					32 (Note: Religa – 6, Olechowski – 5, Balcerowicz – 4, Moczulski – 4, Skubiszewski – 4, Cimoszewicz – 3, Suchocka – 3, Strzembosz – 2, Oleksy – 1)	16	7
OBOP exit poll	19 Jun 1994	4,035	22	11		3	13	7					29 (Note: Balcerowicz – 7, Religa – 7, Mazowiecki – 4, Moczulski – 4, Krzaklewski – 2, Strzembosz – 2)	15	9
CBOS	19–23 May 1994	1,209	16	6	4		9						41 (Note: Olechowski – 7, Religa – 6, Skubiszewski – 6, Balcerowicz – 4, Strzembosz – 4, Cimoszewicz – 3, Moczulski – 3, Oleksy – 3, Bugaj – 2, Suchocka – 2, J. Kaczyński – 1)	25	7
CBOS	25-28 Mar 1994	1,230	17	5	2		10						58 (Note: Religa – 8, Brzeziński – 6, Olechowski – 6, Skubiszewski – 6, Balcerowicz – 5, Cimoszewicz – 5, Moczulski – 5, Suchocka – 5, Oleksy – 3, Bugaj – 2)	10	7
CBOS	27-31 Jan 1994	1,172	17	9	3		11						44 (Note: Skubiszewski – 11, Olechowski – 7, Suchocka – 7, Religa – 6, Moczulski – 4, Cimoszewicz – 3, Oleksy – 3, Bugaj – 1, Chrzanowski – 1)	15	6

=== Second round ===
Polling firm/Link	Fieldwork date	Sample size	Kwaśniewski SdRP	Wałęsa IN	Don't know	Abstain	Lead
1995 presidential election	Election result	18,762,615	51.72	48.28			3.44
Demoskop	9-12 Nov 1995	999	47	53			6
RUN	2 Nov 1995	989	44	51			7
CBOS	9-12 Nov 1995	1,253	42	46	10	1	4
CBOS	29 Oct 1995	1,281	46	48			2
OBOP	24 Oct 1995	1,145	46	44			2
CBOS	2-5 Sep 1994	1,219	42	20			22

== Results ==
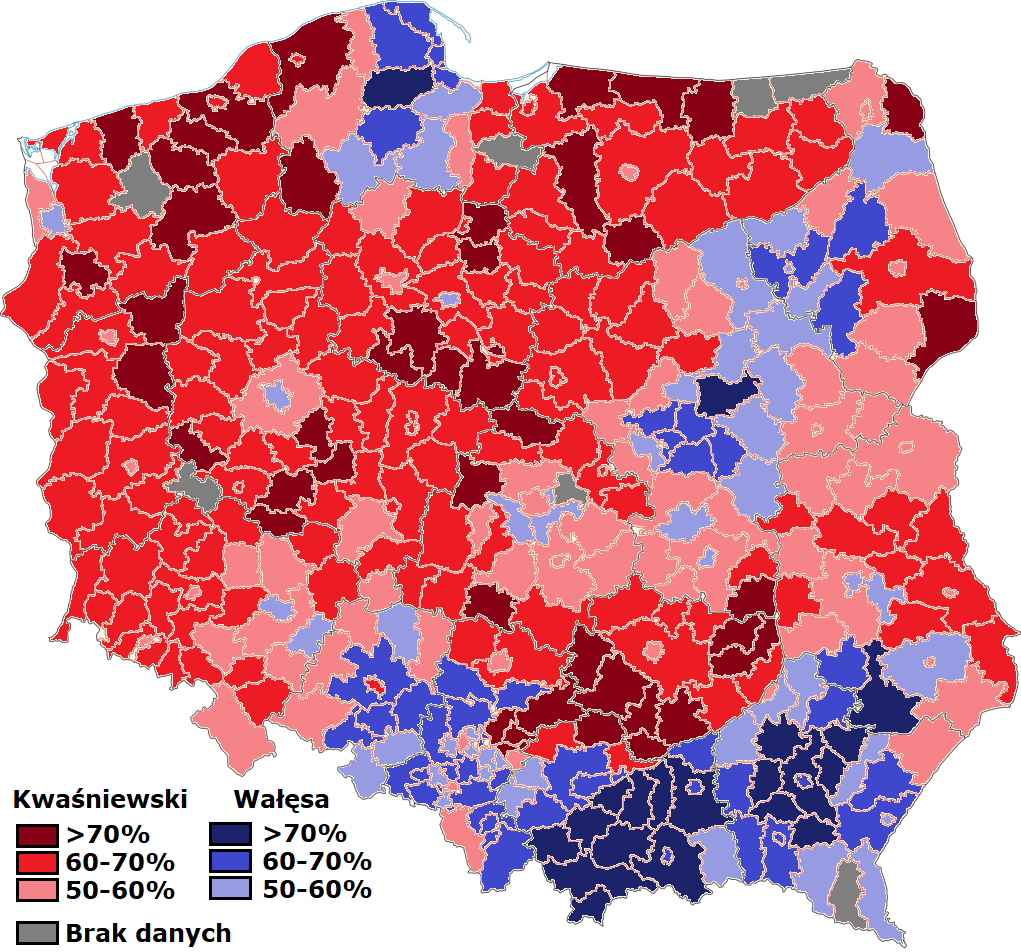
Winners of the second round by powiats (1999 borders)

Kwaśniewski won with 52% of the vote in the run-off. 65% of voters voted in the first round and 68% in the second round.

Candidate	Party	First round		Second round	
Candidate	Party	Votes	%	Votes	%
Aleksander Kwaśniewski	Democratic Left Alliance (SdRP)	6,275,670	35.11	9,704,439	51.72
Lech Wałęsa	Independent	5,917,328	33.11	9,058,176	48.28
Jacek Kuroń	Freedom Union	1,646,946	9.22		
Jan Olszewski	Movement for the Republic	1,225,453	6.86		
Waldemar Pawlak	Polish People's Party	770,419	4.31		
Tadeusz Zieliński	Labor Union	631,432	3.53		
Hanna Gronkiewicz-Waltz	Independent	492,628	2.76		
Janusz Korwin-Mikke	Real Politics Union	428,969	2.40		
Andrzej Lepper	Self-Defence of the Republic of Poland	235,797	1.32		
Jan Pietrzak	Independent	201,033	1.12		
Tadeusz Koźluk	Independent	27,259	0.15		
Kazimierz Piotrowicz	Independent	12,591	0.07		
Leszek Bubel	Independent	6,825	0.04		
Total		17,872,350	100.00	18,762,615	100.00
Valid votes		17,872,350	98.18	18,762,615	98.00
Invalid/blank votes		330,868	1.82	383,881	2.00
Total votes		18,203,218	100.00	19,146,496	100.00
Registered voters/turnout		28,136,332	64.70	28,062,409	68.23
Source: Nohlen & Stöver

Vote share
Second round
Kwaśniewski	51.72%
Wałęsa	48.28%
First round
Kwaśniewski	35.11%
Wałęsa	33.11%
Kuroń	9.22%
Olszewski	6.86%
Pawlak	4.31%
Zieliński	3.53%
Gronkiewicz-Waltz	2.76%
Korwin-Mikke	2.40%
Lepper	1.32%
Pietrzak	1.12%
Others	0.26%

=== Electorate demographics ===
OBOP exit polls for the first and second rounds
Demographic	Second round		First round												
Demographic	Kwaśniewski SdRP	Wałęsa Ind.	Kwaśniewski SdRP	Wałesa Ind.	Kuroń UW	Olszewski RdR	Pawlak PSL	Zieliński UP	Gronkiewicz-Waltz Ind.	Korwin-Mikke UPR	Lepper SRP	Pietrzak Ind.	Koźluk Ind.	Piotrowicz Ind.	Bubel Ind.
Total vote	51.72	48.28	35.11	33.11	9.22	6.82	4.31	3.53	2.76	2.40	1.32	1.12	0.15	0.07	0.04
Exit poll results	51.3	48.7	33.7	33.1	10.0	7.0	3.7	3.7	3.0	2.8	1.0	1.0	0.1	0.1	0.1
Sex
Men	51.9	48.1	34.2	32.0	9.6	7.7	4.2	3.3	2.2	3.5	1.1	1.1	0.1	0.1	0.1
Women	50.6	49.4	33.2	34.3	10.4	6.3	3.3	4.1	3.9	2.0	0.9	0.9	0.1	0.1	0.1
Age
18–29 years	54.0	46.0	32.6	28.9	12.7	6.0	3.2	3.3	4.6	5.6	1.1	1.2	0.1	0.1	0.1
30–39 years	51.0	49.0	32.8	31.6	10.6	7.5	4.0	3.6	3.1	3.3	1.2	1.5	0.1	0.0	0.0
40–49 years	54.2	45.8	37.5	30.5	9.7	7.6	3.5	3.9	2.4	2.1	1.0	1.2	0.1	0.0	0.0
50–59 years	49.2	50.8	34.2	37.2	8.2	7.4	3.3	4.0	2.2	0.8	1.0	0.5	0.2	0.1	0.1
60+ years	42.5	57.5	30.5	42.3	7.1	6.7	4.9	3.6	1.9	0.3	0.8	0.3	0.1	0.1	0.1
Education
Elementary	48.3	51.7	30.9	39.8	6.8	5.8	8.5	2.3	1.8	0.9	1.9	0.6	0.1	0.1	0.1
Vocational	52.9	47.1	34.9	36.4	7.0	7.1	4.4	2.3	2.4	2.0	1.6	1.4	0.1	0.1	0.1
Secondary	52.3	47.7	35.9	31.3	9.6	7.5	2.7	4.2	3.4	3.1	0.7	1.2	0.2	0.1	0.0
Higher	48.6	51.4	30.2	24.9	18.9	7.2	1.3	5.9	4.7	5.7	0.2	0.7	0.1	0.0	0.0
Agglomeration
Rural	52.3	47.7	33.4	33.4	6.3	7.2	9.6	2.4	2.6	1.4	2.1	0.9	0.1	0.1	0.1
10,000 – 100,000 pop.	53.9	46.1	36.7	31.8	10.9	7.0	1.2	4.1	3.1	3.0	0.7	1.1	0.1	0.1	0.1
>100,000 pop.	47.8	52.2	31.4	33.4	13.3	7.0	0.5	4.6	3.4	4.4	0.4	1.2	0.2	0.1	0.0
Occupation
Entrepreneur	42.3	57.7	27.9	38.8	9.5	7.0	1.5	3.2	2.9	6.5	0.6	1.6	0.2	0.1	0.1
Manager	55.9	44.1	38.7	26.6	12.3	7.2	1.9	5.4	3.3	3.1	0.3	0.8	0.0	0.1	0.1
Specialist/Freelancer	44.2	55.8	27.3	28.2	19.6	7.6	1.2	5.3	4.5	4.8	0.3	0.9	0.1	0.0	0.0
Office employees	55.1	44.9	37.4	28.7	10.9	8.0	1.8	5.2	3.6	2.3	0.5	1.3	0.1	0.0	0.0
Service employees	51.1	48.9	35.2	34.9	9.8	5.8	1.7	3.3	3.0	3.3	1.1	1.6	0.1	0.0	0.0
Housewife	46.0	54.0	32.4	38.0	7.4	5.4	5.7	2.0	3.7	2.1	1.6	1.0	0.2	0.0	0.3
Farmer	55.7	44.3	30.0	31.0	3.0	6.8	21.3	1.0	1.5	0.5	3.8	0.7	0.0	0.0	0.1
Workers	53.5	46.5	35.5	35.3	7.1	8.5	2.9	2.8	2.4	2.0	1.4	1.4	0.1	0.1	0.1
Student	50.2	49.8	29.2	26.0	17.5	6.0	1.5	4.6	5.5	7.9	0.6	0.7	0.2	0.1	0.0
Unemployed	60.2	39.8	38.1	27.8	10.7	6.4	4.3	2.6	3.8	2.4	1.6	1.7	0.0	0.2	0.1
Retired	47.0	53.0	33.7	39.7	7.5	6.4	4.0	4.0	2.2	0.6	1.0	0.6	0.2	0.1	0.1
Region
North-eastern (Note: Suwałki, Olsztyn and Elbląg Voivodeships)	64.7	35.3	42.3	23.8	12.0	4.7	2.8	4.1	2.7	3.6	1.6	1.2	0.3	0.1	0.1
Pomeranian (Note: Gdańsk, Bydgoszcz and Toruń Voivodeships)	49.1	50.9	33.4	36.0	9.0	6.0	1.9	3.6	3.9	3.6	0.8	0.9	0.1	0.1	0.1
North-western (Note: Słupsk, Koszalin, Szczecin and Gorzów Voivodeships)	65.7	34.3	47.2	21.8	11.2	4.9	1.3	4.5	2.8	3.1	1.4	0.9	0.1	0.0	0.1
Lesser Silesian (Note: Zielona Góra, Legnica, Jelenia Góra, Wałbrzych and Wrocław Voivodeships)	60.3	39.7	41.8	27.7	12.1	4.2	1.6	4.8	2.5	2.3	1.0	1.0	0.2	0.1	0.0
Greater Polish (Note: Piła, Poznań, Leszno and Kalisz Voivodeships)	58.1	41.9	37.8	29.9	12.7	3.6	3.7	3.5	2.8	2.8	1.5	0.8	0.2	0.0	0.1
Silesian (Note: Katowice and Opole Voivodeships)	46.7	53.3	31.2	38.5	10.3	5.6	1.0	4.1	4.2	2.1	0.6	1.4	0.1	0.0	0.0
Lesser Polish (Note: Bielsko, Kraków, Nowy Sącz, Tarnów, Rzeszów, Przemyśl and Krosno Voivodeships)	32.7	67.3	20.8	46.5	8.0	9.3	3.8	3.3	3.6	2.4	0.8	0.7	0.0	0.0	0.1
Eastern (Note: Łomża, Białystok, Siedlce, Biała Podlaska, Lublin, Chełm, Tarnobrzeg and Zamość Voivodeships)	50.8	49.2	29.8	33.5	5.9	10.5	9.9	2.2	2.4	1.9	1.6	1.3	0.1	0.0	0.1
Mazovian-Kujavian (Note: Ostrołęka, Ciechanów, Płock, Włocławek, Konin, Skierniewice and Warsaw Voivodeships)	48.3	51.7	31.5	31.2	11.6	9.0	3.8	3.6	3.0	3.6	0.8	0.9	0.1	0.1	0.0
Central (Note: Łódź, Sieradz, Piotrków, Radom, Kielce and Częstochowa Voivodeships)	57.9	42.1	37.5	28.7	9.9	7.3	5.0	3.7	2.1	3.0	0.8	1.2	0.1	0.1	0.0
First round presidential vote in 1990
Bartoszcze	77.8	22.2	30.1	11.0	3.4	6.9	36.5	3.9	2.0	0.6	3.3	1.4	0.0	0.0	0.4
Cimoszewicz	97.2	2.8	86.2	1.7	3.3	1.5	1.7	2.8	0.7	0.8	0.7	0.3	0.1	0.0	0.1
Mazowiecki	86.5	13.5	33.9	9.9	32.4	5.1	1.3	6.7	5.3	4.2	0.2	0.6	0.2	0.1	0.0
Moczulski	44.4	55.6	19.5	22.3	9.8	22.1	3.0	5.3	2.7	7.1	2.7	3.0	0.7	0.1	0.2
Tymiński	90.4	9.6	65.7	5.7	6.3	5.1	4.7	3.0	2.2	2.4	2.6	1.7	0.1	0.0	0.2
Wałęsa	26.7	73.3	17.5	53.4	6.8	8.5	3.4	3.0	2.8	2.5	0.7	1.0	0.1	0.1	0.0
Didn't vote	64.2	35.8	41.8	20.7	12.6	5.9	3.0	4.2	3.9	5.0	1.1	1.4	0.1	0.1	0.0
Sejm vote in 1993
BBWR	12.0	88.0	8.8	70.9	5.5	4.7	0.4	2.8	3.5	2.2	0.5	0.3	0.1	0.1	0.0
KKW "Ojczyzna"	8.6	91.4	6.3	67.5	2.7	10.1	2.4	1.1	6.8	1.5	0.6	0.5	0.1	0.0	0.1
KdR	–	–	11.0	25.3	1.4	55.8	0.0	0.6	2.4	1.8	0.0	1.2	0.6	0.0	0.0
KPN	24.9	75.1	12.7	42.0	7.9	19.7	1.0	4.1	3.1	4.9	1.0	2.3	0.4	0.1	0.2
KLD	–	–	16.0	37.0	23.9	5.2	0.1	3.6	6.5	6.9	0.0	0.6	0.0	0.0	0.2
X	–	–	60.8	7.4	5.8	6.8	2.9	2.6	3.0	3.0	3.1	3.8	0.2	0.0	0.2
PSL	68.7	31.3	36.7	18.0	4.3	6.5	23.4	4.5	2.5	0.8	2.4	0.5	0.2	0.0	0.0
PSL-PL	–	–	37.8	16.5	4.6	7.9	23.0	3.3	2.3	1.0	2.5	0.7	0.1	0.1	0.0
PC	18.5	81.5	10.2	40.0	5.4	30.9	0.6	3.1	4.8	3.1	0.0	1.2	0.2	0.1	0.2
Samoobrona	–	–	21.9	27.4	7.5	7.8	5.1	3.8	1.1	1.1	18.9	3.8	0.5	0.0	1.1
SLD	98.1	1.9	89.5	1.5	3.0	1.0	0.6	2.2	0.3	0.8	0.4	0.4	0.1	0.0	0.0
Solidarność	18.1	81.9	12.7	61.9	6.3	8.9	1.8	2.5	2.6	1.2	0.8	1.0	0.1	0.1	0.0
UD	31.5	68.5	12.7	28.7	39.1	4.3	0.2	5.4	5.7	2.9	0.2	0.6	0.2	0.0	0.0
UPR	–	–	8.7	17.8	6.8	5.7	1.3	3.0	2.9	52.3	0.3	0.9	0.1	0.1	0.0
UP	59.5	40.5	28.7	19.8	19.9	8.5	0.7	14.3	3.0	2.3	0.5	1.5	0.3	0.2	0.1
Didn't vote	–	–	36.8	26.8	11.6	6.4	2.7	3.9	4.1	4.3	1.4	1.5	0.1	0.1	0.1
Transfer of electorates from the first round of the election
Electorates transferred from candidates in column to candidate in row	Didn't vote		Kwaśniewski SdRP	Wałesa Ind.	Kuroń UW	Olszewski RdR	Pawlak PSL	Zieliński UP	Gronkiewicz-Waltz Ind.	Korwin-Mikke UPR	Lepper SRP	Pietrzak Ind.	Koźluk Ind.	Piotrowicz Ind.	Bubel Ind.
Aleksander Kwaśniewski	59.5		98.6	3.1	43.2	25.9	67.1	67.4	28.0	37.6	70.4	49.6	–	–	–
Lech Wałęsa	40.5		1.4	96.9	56.8	74.1	32.9	32.6	72.0	62.4	29.6	50.4	–	–	–

== Conduct ==
With increasing tension surrounding the election, occasional political violence occurred, primarily from right-wing groups fearing the return of communism in Poland. Individual opponents of Kwaśniewski spontaneously threw food at him, or acted aggressively around his supporters. In Przemyśl, an incident occurred where tear gas was used to disrupt a rally.

During the signature collection process in Lublin, activists collecting signatures for Kwaśniewski and Kuroń were chased out by youth activists of the Stronnictwo Narodowe „Szczerbiec” (Polish: Stronnictwo Narodowe „Szczerbiec”) under the lead of Konrad Rękas, who chanted slogans like "Go steal from Jerusalem" (Polish: Jedźcie okradać Jerozolimę). In Autumn, when Kwaśniewski arrived to campaign in Lublin, "Szczerbiec" and Republican League activists attempted to break into his campaign bus, culminating in a brawl. On 14 November, five days before the second round of the election, "Szczerbiec" organized a rally in Lublin to honor Eligiusz Niewiadomski, the assassin of Poland's first President, Gabriel Narutowicz. The demonstrating students declared "Niewiadomski is amongst us", and hanging posters of Kwaśniewski with a revolver to his temple.

On 10 September 1995, Jan Maria Rokita, a politician of the Freedom Union's right wing, created the 3/4 Initiative, named after the claim that 3/4 of voters opposed Kwaśniewski's candidacy, instead collecting signatures for Gronkiewicz-Waltz, Kuroń, Wałęsa and Kaczyński. The Initiative, associating "fanatical" liberals, attempted to disrupt Kwaśniewski's field campaign, and following Kwaśniewski's victory, helped Wałęsa in attempting to contest the election's results. Following the Supreme Court's confirmation of the validity of the election, a group of 300 people, joined by politicians like Ryszard Czarnecki, surrounded the headquarters of Social Democracy of the Republic of Poland, throwing fireworks and demanding annulment of the elections.

== Aftermath ==
Lech Wałęsa contested the election results, but they were reaffirmed by the Supreme Court.
