= Conservative Coalition (Poland) =

Conservative Coalition Polish: Koalicja Konserwatywna
- Abbreviation: KK
- Chairman: Kazimierz Ujazdowski
- Founded: 7 February 1994
- Dissolved: 22 February 1999
- Youth wing: Forum of Young Conservatives
- Membership: 1300
- Ideology: Christian democracy Conservatism

The Conservative Coalition (KK) was a right-wing Polish political party functioning between 1994 and 1999.

== History ==
The Conservative Coalition was founded as a result of a split in the Conservative Party of Aleksander Hall on 7 February 1994 under Kazimierz Ujazdowski. The reason for the splinter was a disagreement with Hall about the model of uniting the right following its massive failure at the 1993 parliamentary election. The group under Kazimierz Ujazdowski supported cooperation with the center-right Centre Agreement and National Christian Union, while Hall was supportive of cooperation with the liberal Democratic Union and Liberal Democratic Congress.

In 1994 the Coalition was in the Covenant for Poland. A year later it supported Hanna Gronkiewicz-Waltz in the 1995 presidential election. In 1996 the party cofounded the Solidarity Electoral Action, and in the 1997 parliamentary election it gained two seats from the Solidarity Electoral Action coalition, for Kazimierz Ujazdowski and Jerzy Polaczek.

In February 1999, the Conservative Coalition merged with the Conservative People's Party and disbanded.

== Leaders ==
- Piotr Krzywicki
- Rafał Matyja
- Jerzy Polaczek
- Andrzej Raj
- Kazimierz Michał Ujazdowski
- Paweł Zalewski
