= Opinion polling on the Lech Wałęsa presidency =

Surveying on 1990–1995 Polish administration

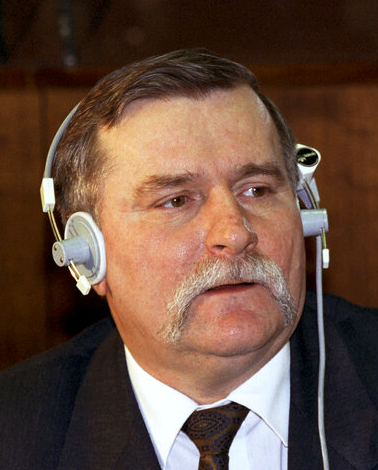
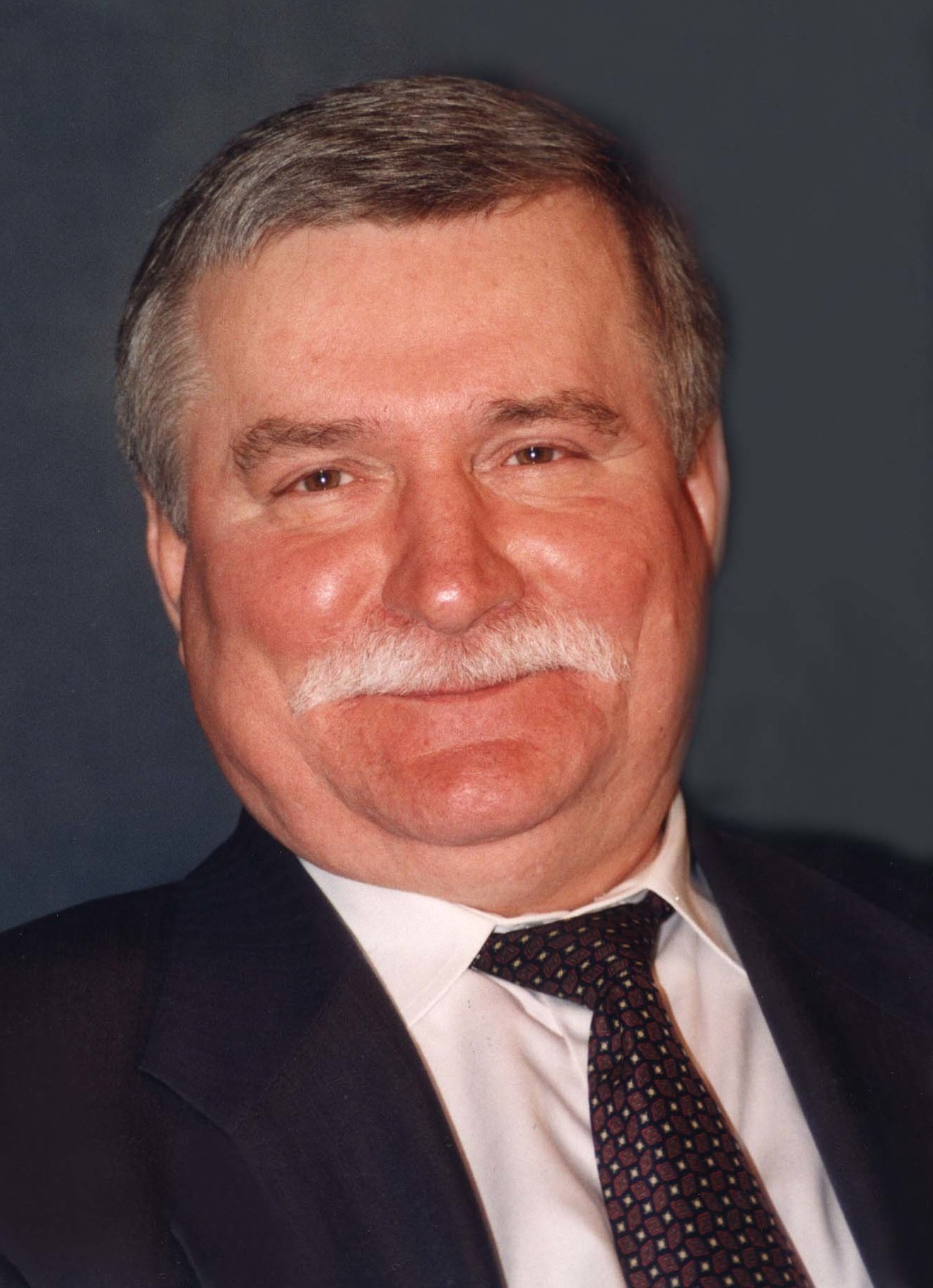
Lech Wałęsa in 1991 and 1996.

Lech Wałęsa was elected to the office of President of Poland in the first direct presidential election in Poland, the 1990 presidential election, serving until the inauguration of Aleksander Kwaśniewski, Wałęsa's runoff opponent in the 1995 presidential election. Throughout Wałęsa's presidency, several polling agencies conducted opinion polls gauging his approval rating as president.

Wałęsa maintained an overwhelmingly negative approval rating throughout the second half of his term, with his approval becoming positive only during a period of increased polarization before the second turn of the 1995 presidential election.

== Approval polls ==
Graphical summary of approval polls

Date(s) conducted	Polling firm/Link	Sample size	Approve	Disapprove	Don't know/Neutral	Net approval
9–12 Nov 1995	CBOS	1,254	51	41	8	10
29 Sep–3 Oct 1995	OBOP	1,385	30	62	8	–32
1–4 Sep 1995	CBOS	1,150	23	64	13	–41
7–12 Jul 1995	CBOS	1,115	27	60	12	–33
Jun–Jul 1995	OBOP		26	66	8	–39
10–13 Jun 1995	OBOP	1,100	31	63	6	–32
13–16 May 1995	OBOP	1,081	20	71	9	–52
5–10 May 1995	CBOS	1,203	25	65	10	–40
1–4 Apr 1995	OBOP	1,112	26	69	4	–43
3–7 Mar 1995	OBOP	1,086	23	70	6	–47
4–6 Mar 1995	CBOS	1,208	25	64	11	–39
14 Feb 1995	Demoskop	971	23	67		–44
3–6 Feb 1995	OBOP	1,123	28	66	6	–38
6–9 Jan 1995	CBOS	1,230	25	64	11	–39
9–13 Dec 1994	OBOP	1,035	21	69	9	–48
18–22 Nov 1994	OBOP	1,031	20	71	9	–51
3–7 Nov 1994	CBOS	1,237	22	69	9	–47
1–4 Oct 1994	OBOP	1,130	19	73	7	–54
2–6 Sep 1994	OBOP	1,048	26	68	6	–42
2–5 Sep 1994	CBOS	1,219	26	64	11	–38
15–19 Jul 1994	OBOP	966	26	70	4	–44
17–20 Jun 1994	CBOS	1,197	26	64	10	–38
20–25 May 1994	OBOP	1,107	26	69	5	–43
14–18 Apr 1994	CBOS	1,197	25	64	12	–39
23–29 Mar 1994	OBOP	1,197	31	63	6	–32
11–15 Feb 1994	CBOS	1,198	35	55		–20
9–14 Dec 1993	CBOS	1,239	30	57		–27
20–25 Oct 1993	CBOS	1,192	39	49	12	–10
7–12 Jul 1993	CBOS	1,127	32	56	13	–24
14–17 May 1993	CBOS	1,075	29	61	10	–32
Mar 1993	CBOS		41	48		–7
15–17 Jan 1993	CBOS	1,208	37	48		–11
13–15 Nov 1992	CBOS	1,184	44	44		0
2–7 Sep 1992	CBOS	1,153	41	49		–8
1–3 May 1992	CBOS	1,191	36	52	13	–16
5–10 Mar 1992	CBOS	1,172	38	46	15	–8
10–13 Oct 1991	CBOS	1,500	46	43	11	3
20–23 Sep 1991	CBOS	1,500	49	41	11	8
23–26 Aug 1991	CBOS	1,000	49	39	11	10
12–14 Jul 1991	CBOS	1,000	36	56	8	–20
14–17 Jun 1991	CBOS	1,000	46.0	42.3	11.4	3.7
18–21 May 1991	CBOS	1,000	51	41	7	10
12–16 Apr 1991	CBOS	1,000	70	20	10	50
Feb 1991	CBOS		53	25		28
Jan 1991	CBOS		60	20		40

== Support for a "presidential party" ==
Throughout Wałęsa's presidency, opinion polls were conducted whether voters would support a "presidential party" loyal to Wałęsa. In 1993, the Nonpartisan Bloc for Support of Reforms (Polish: Bezpartyjny Blok Wspierania Reform, BBWR) was established as a pro-Wałęsa nonpartisan political organization, and parliamentary election polling indicated the party hovered around the 5% threshold in the 1993 parliamentary election, ultimately gaining 5.41% of the vote and 16 seats.

Date(s) conducted	Polling firm/Link	Sample size	Would vote
April 1993	CBOS	1,223	12
July 1991	PBS	1,049	29

== See also ==
- 1990 Polish presidential election
- 1995 Polish presidential election
