= Czesław Janicki =

Polish scientist and activist (1926–2012)

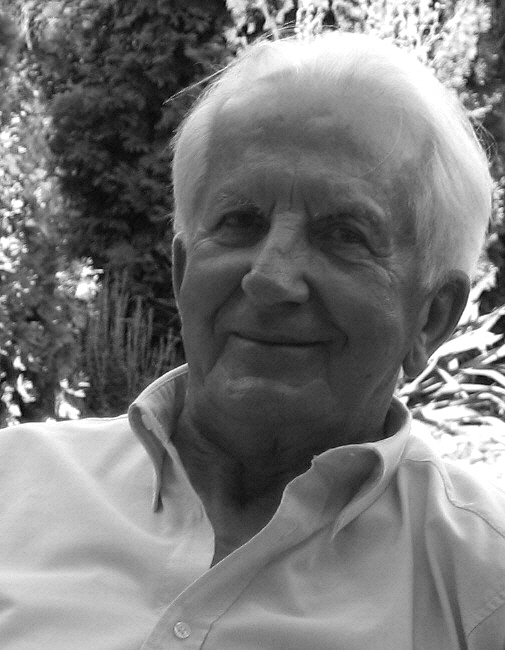
- Czesław Janicki (2006)
- Born: July 19, 1926; Korytnica, Poland
- Died: December 29, 2012 (aged 86); Poznań
- Education: Agricultural School in Bojanów; Pedagogical High School in Krotoszyn
- Alma mater: Warsaw University of Life Sciences; University of Life Sciences in Poznań
- Occupations: zootechnician, teacher, academic lecturer
- Title: Professor of agricultural sciences
- Political party: Polish People's Party, United People's Party, Polish People's Party "Rebirth", Polish People's Party, Polish Folk-Christian Forum "Heritage"
- Honours: Order of Polonia Restituta, Medal of the National Education Commission, Medal of the 40th Anniversary of People's Poland

Czesław Janicki

Deputy Prime Minister of Poland, Minister of Agriculture and Rural Development
- In office September 12, 1989 – July 6, 1990
- Preceded by: Kazimierz Olesiak
- Succeeded by: Mieczysław Stelmach

Personal details
- Party: United People's Party, Polish People's Party "Rebirth", Polish People's Party

Czesław Andrzej Janicki (born 19 July 1926 in Korytnica, died 29 December 2012 in Poznań) was a Polish scientist, zootechnician, teacher, and academic lecturer, professor of agricultural sciences, Minister of Agriculture and Deputy Prime Minister (1989–1990), and a member of the Sejm during its 10th term.

== Biography ==
=== Early life ===
During World War II, beginning in July 1944, Czesław Andrzej Janicki worked as a forced laborer in Gądki near Poznań, digging rifle trenches and anti-tank ditches. From August of that year, he was imprisoned for three months in the penal-investigation camp in Żabikowo. On 5 January 1945, he was transferred to trench-digging duties near Wieluń.

After the war, he completed studies at the Agricultural School in Bojanowo (1947). In 1951, he also passed an additional exam in pedagogical subjects at the Pedagogical High School in Krotoszyn. He became a teacher and manager of the farm at the Agricultural School in Psary and began his involvement with the Polish People's Party.

In April 1950, Janicki was arrested by officers of the Security Service under unfounded charges of sabotage. He was imprisoned in Krotoszyn until March of the following year, after which he was transferred to work at the Agricultural High School in Wolsztyn. He worked there from 1951 to 1955 (until the school changed its specialization), then took up employment at the Agricultural Technical School in Koźmin Wielkopolski, where he lived with his family until 1969.

Simultaneously with his teaching career, he pursued studies at the Warsaw University of Life Sciences (1952–1956, engineering degree) and the University of Life Sciences in Poznań (master's degree in 1964).

=== Scientific career ===
After completing his master's studies, Czesław Janicki began his scientific work. In 1967, he earned a doctoral degree based on his dissertation titled Variability of Protein Components in the Milk of Cows in Pedigree Herds of Biskupin Cattle. In October 1968, his mentor, Professor Witold Folejewski, offered him a position at the university. Starting on 1 September 1969, he held the post of assistant professor in the Department of Genetics and Fundamentals of Animal Breeding at the University of Life Sciences in Poznań. His work focused on the genetic improvement of milk yield and quality in cows, while also teaching students. In 1973, he achieved his habilitation degree, and in 1987, he was awarded the title of professor of agricultural sciences. He authored several publications on the treatment of dairy cattle.

Janicki was active in the Polish Society of Veterinary Sciences, the Michał Oczapowski Polish Zootechnical Society, and the Poznań Society of Friends of Learning. From 1975 to 1977, he served as the chairman of the Polish Zootechnical Society branch at the University of Life Sciences in Poznań. In 1997, he was honored with the PTZ Honorary Badge.

Between 1978 and 1984, he served as the vice-dean of the Faculty of Animal Science and was the head of the Department of Genetics and Fundamentals of Animal Breeding from 1981 to 1990. In 1984, he became the university's vice-rector, but following amendments to the Higher Education Act in 1985, the minister dismissed him from this position, deeming him "unsuitable for socialist student education". His scientific and teaching career was interrupted by several years of political activity. At the start of the 1990s, he returned to academic work.

At the Department of Genetics and Fundamentals of Animal Breeding, Janicki led research on improving milk productivity in cattle through crossbreeding with Holstein Friesian cattle. He authored publications such as Animal Breeding (1973) and The Relationship Between Beta-Lactoglobulins and Certain Milk Productivity Traits in Cows (1973). In 1990, he supervised two doctoral dissertations: An Attempt to Analyze the Assessment of Bulls' Breeding Value Estimated by the CC Method Based on Test Herds and Large-Scale Pedigree Herds by Ireneusz Dymarski, and Estimating Genetic Correlations and Heritability of Milk Traits in Black-and-White Cattle by Tomasz Szwaczkowski.

=== Social and political activities ===
Czesław Janicki was a long-time activist in the United People's Party, and from 1990, he was briefly a member of the Polish People's Party. In the 1989 parliamentary elections, he was elected to the Contract Sejm representing the Poznań-Stare Miasto district (mandate no. 305). He was elected in the second round of voting on 18 June 1989, defeating Dobrochna Martin in a runoff. By the end of his term, he was a member of the Christian-People's Parliamentary Club, associated with the Polish Folk-Christian Forum "Heritage". As a member of parliament, he worked in the Commission for Communication with Poles Abroad and two extraordinary commissions.

During the formation of Tadeusz Mazowiecki's cabinet, the United People's Party wanted Kazimierz Olesiak to be appointed as Minister of Agriculture. However, the new prime minister rejected the candidacy of someone closely associated with the cabinet of Mieczysław Rakowski. As a result, the choice fell on Czesław Janicki, whose views were closer to those of the Solidarity movement. On 12 September 1989, Czesław Janicki was appointed Deputy Prime Minister and Minister of Agriculture and Rural Development in Tadeusz Mazowiecki's cabinet (from 20 December 1989, he served as Deputy Prime Minister and Minister of Agriculture and Food Economy).

During his time in office, there were increasing protests by farmers. On 27 June 1990, a group of farmers began occupying the Ministry of Agriculture building. Two days later, in the early morning hours, Prime Minister Mazowiecki decided to order a police assault to end the occupation. Czesław Janicki opposed this decision, which led to a conflict between him and Tadeusz Mazowiecki. On July 6, Czesław Janicki was dismissed from his position. Mieczysław Stelmach was appointed as the interim head of the ministry. On 14 September 1990, Prime Minister Mazowiecki appointed Janusz Byliński as the new Minister of Agriculture. In 1991, Czesław Janicki did not seek re-election to parliament.

== Decorations, honors, and commemoration ==
By a decree on 26 July 2012, for his outstanding contributions to building the democratic state of Poland, and for his achievements in state, public, and scientific-educational activities, Czesław Janicki was awarded the Commander's Cross of the Order of Polonia Restituta by President Bronisław Komorowski. The decoration ceremony took place on 11 November 2012.

He was also awarded the Officer's Cross of the Order of Polonia Restituta (1989), the Medal of the National Education Commission (1984), and the Medal of the 40th Anniversary of People's Poland (1984).

On 10 May 2016, during a ceremony attended by Grzegorz Skrzypczak and the widow of the professor, a commemorative plaque was unveiled in his honor at the National Museum of Agriculture in Szreniawa.

== Private life ==
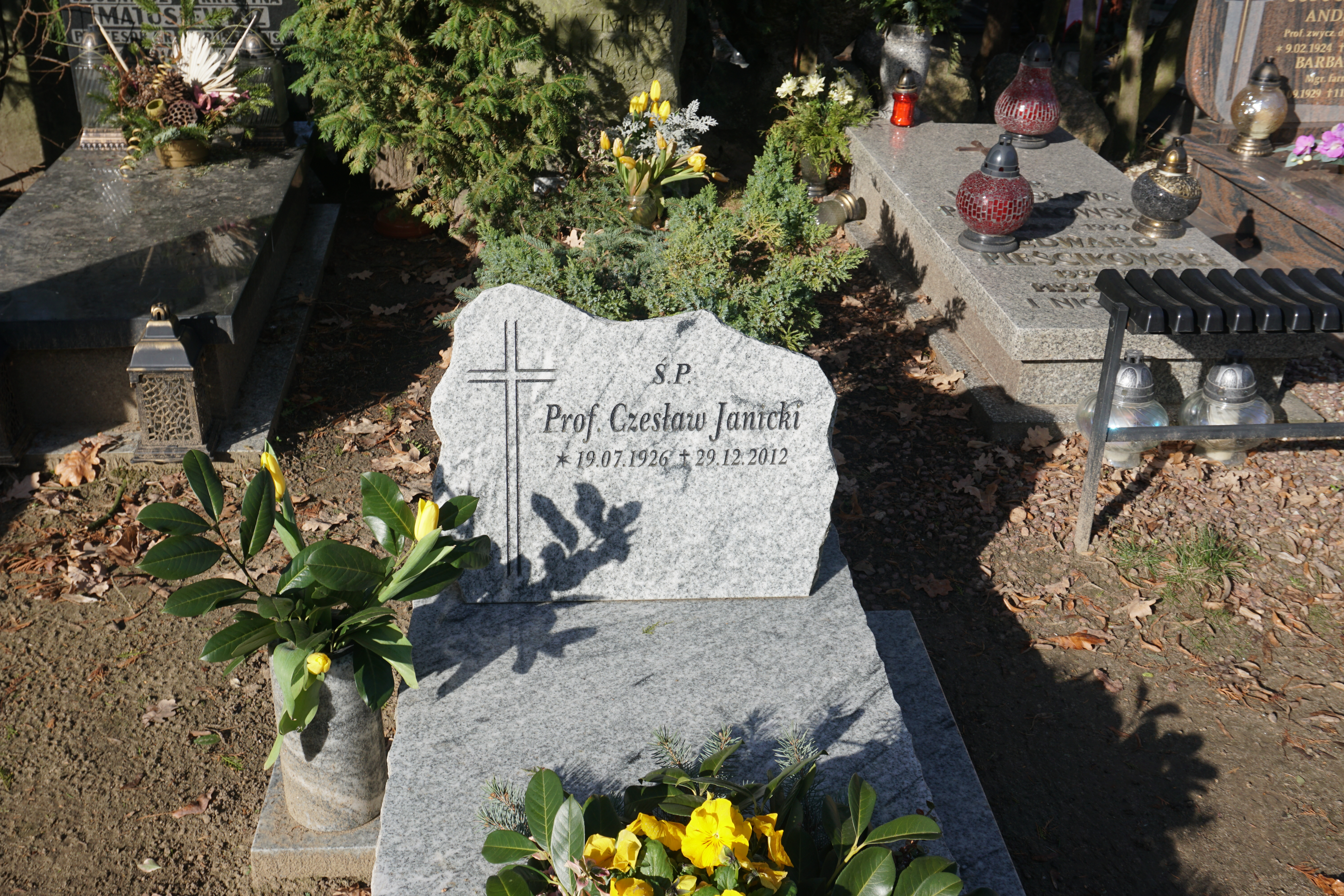
Grave of Czesław Janicki at the St. John Vianney parish cemetery in Poznań

He was the son of Andrzej and Agnieszka. In 1952, Czesław Janicki married Cecylia Adamczewska; they had two daughters, Ewa and Barbara. He lived in Poznań.

He is buried at the St. John Vianney parish cemetery in Poznań (Section St. Barbara–31–6).
