= Forum of the Democratic Right =

Political party in Poland from 1990 to 1991

Forum of the Democratic Right Forum Prawicy Demokratycznej (Polish)
- Leader: Aleksander Hall
- Founder: Aleksander Hall; Stanisław Somma; Jerzy Dietl; Tadeusz Syryjczyk; Micał Wojtczak; Tomasz Wołek; Henryk Woźniakowski; Michał Chałoński
- Founded: 27 June 1990
- Dissolved: 11 May 1991
- Preceded by: Polish Political Movement
- Succeeded by: Democratic Union
- Membership: ~1000
- Ideology: Liberal conservatism Economic liberalism Reformism
- Political position: Centre-right

The Forum of the Democratic Right (Polish: Forum Prawicy Demokratycznej, FPD) was a conservative political party in Poland from 1990 to 1991.

== History ==
=== Background ===
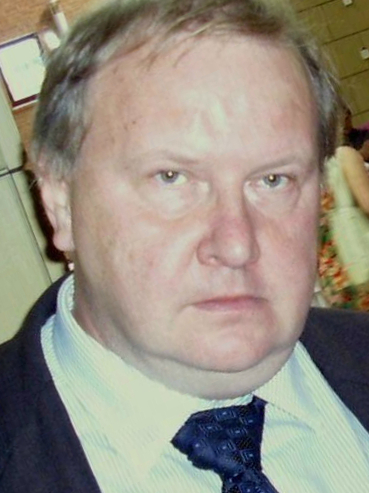
Party leader Aleksander Hall, 2006

In July 1979, the Young Poland Movement (RMP) split off from the Movement for Defence of Human and Civic Rights. The Movement was a rightwing anti-communist opposition group founded in July 1979, setting the reclamation of total sovereignty as its primary goal.

On 15 September 1989, the radical National Democratic, National Catholic branch of RMP took part in the creation of the Christian National Union. Their departure from RMP deprived the Movement of a large part of its members, and quickly led to its collapse. The moderate, centre-right branch established the Polish Political Movement (Ruch Polityki Polskiej (Polish), RPP).

A precursor to FPD, the short-lived "Democratic Christian-Liberal Forum" (Polish: Demokratyczne Forum Chrześcijańsko-Liberalne) was founded on 15 June 1990. It existed as a member of the Kraków-based Alliance for Democracy (Polish: Sojusz na rzecz Demokracji).

=== FPD as a party ===
The Forum was founded on 27 June 1990, by representatives of different political groupings - members of RPP, several economic, commercial, and industrial councils, academic unions, newspaper editors, representatives of several sejmiks, as well as several major political figures: Senators Stanisław Somma and Jerzy Dietl, Minister Tadeusz Syryjczyk, Deputy Minister Michal Wojtczak, deputy editor-in-chief of Życie Warszawy Tomasz Wołek, Henryk Woźniakowski, Sejm Representative Michał Chałoński and, as a guest, Minister and future FPD leader Aleksander Hall. Therein it declared its intentions of creating a "big-tent Alliance for Democracy" and support for Prime Minister Tadeusz Mazowiecki and his government.

The Forum often cooperated with the Citizens' Movement for Democratic Action (Polish: Ruch Obywatelski Akcja Demokratyczna, ROAD). The two were crucial allies in Mazowiecki's political battle against Solidarność leader Lech Wałęsa, and supported the Prime Minister's candidacy in the 1990 Polish presidential election. Mazowiecki decisively lost the election, falling third behind dark horse candidate Stanisław Tymiński. ROAD and FPD reluctantly endorsed Wałesa in the second round, which led to his election as the President of Poland with a decisive 74.25% of the vote. The humiliated Mazowiecki would resign from the office of Prime Minister on 12 January 1991, which cast FPD and ROAD into de facto parliamentary opposition.

During the first Congress of the FPD on 3–9 November 1990, it elected Hall as its leader, and declared an intention to co-found a larger political formation with ROAD.

=== Dissolution ===
On 11 May 1991, the FPD came into agreement with ROAD to form a new political party, the Democratic Union (UD), wherein they would contend the 1991 Polish parliamentary election together. The Democratic Union would win 62 seats, becoming the largest party in the First Sejm, until FPD's members left UD later in the First Sejm's term.

== Ideology ==
The party was compared to Christian democratic, conservative, liberal and nationalist formations. It espoused the rule of law, strong executive powers and reformism. It claimed to be based on Christian values.

Economically, it supported free market economics, private ownership, privatization and reprivatization, seeking to replicate the Spanish or Italian economic models. It also supported privatizing and demonopolizing the insurance system. It also advocated for European integration.

In terms of foreign policy, it supported reconciliation with reunited Germany and the Soviet Union (later Russia).

== Electoral results ==
=== Presidential ===
Election year	Candidate	1st round		2nd round
Election year	Candidate	# of votes	% of vote	2nd round
1990	Tadeusz Mazowiecki	2,973,264	18.08 (#3)	Supported Lech Wałęsa
