= Citizens' Movement for Democratic Action =

Political party in Poland

Citizens' Movement for Democratic Action Ruch Obywatelski Akcja Demokratyczna
- Leader: Władysław Frasyniuk
- Founder: Zbigniew Bujak; Władysław Frasyniuk; Adam Michnik; Jan Lityński; Henryk Wujec; Zofia Kuratowska
- Founded: 16 July 1990
- Dissolved: 11 May 1991
- Split from: Solidarity Citizens' Committee
- Succeeded by: Democratic Union (Liberal faction); Democratic-Social Movement (Social-democratic faction)
- Membership: ~5000
- Ideology: Liberal democracy Liberalism (Polish); Reformism; Factions: Social democracy Economic liberalism
- Political position: Centre
- National affiliation: Solidarity Citizens' Committee

Timeline of Polish liberal parties after 1989
• Citizens' Movement for Democratic Action /ROAD (1990–1991)
• Liberal Democratic Congress /KLD (1990–1994)
• Democratic Union /UD (1991–1994)
• Freedom Union /UW (1994–2005)
• Civic Platform (2001–2025)
• Democratic Party /PD (2005–2016)
• Palikot's Movement /RP (2011–2013)
• Your Movement /TR (2013–2023)
• Modern/.N (2015– )
• Poland 2050 (2020– )
• Civic Coalition (2025– )

The Citizens' Movement for Democratic Action (Polish: Ruch Obywatelski Akcja Demokratyczna, ROAD) was a political faction in Poland coalescing the liberal wing of Solidarity movement after its entry into the Sejm in the 1989 parliamentary election. Its competition with the conservative wing of Solidarity represented by the Centre Agreement culminated in ROAD's defeat in the 1990 presidential election and ultimate unification with the Forum of the Democratic Right into the Democratic Union.

== History ==
=== Background ===
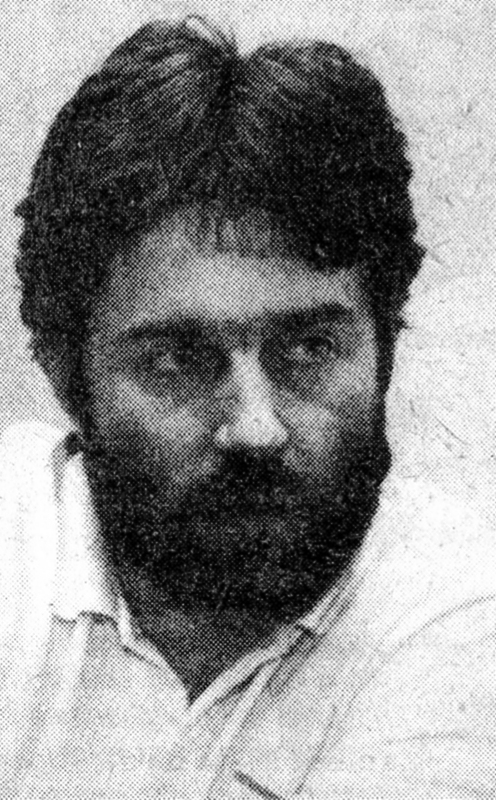
Leader of ROAD, Władysław Frasyniuk, 1990

On 24 August 1989, Tadeusz Mazowiecki became Poland's first non-communist Prime Minister of Poland since Felicjan Sławoj Składkowski in the interwar era. Mazowiecki's coronation as Prime Minister came about as the result of an agreement between two of the political factions within Solidarność - the future Centre Agreement (PC) led by Lech and Jarosław Kaczyński, and the trade union's leader, Lech Wałęsa, who sought to sideline the Polish United Workers' Party (PZPR) and create a coalition between Solidarność, the Alliance of Democrats and United People's Party - formerly PZPR's satellite parties.

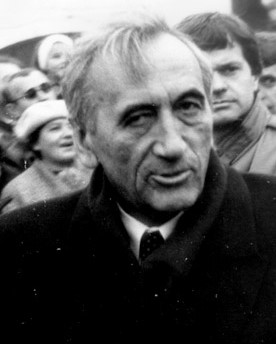
Prime Minister Tadeusz Mazowiecki

However, Mazowiecki, soon after assuming the office of Prime Minister, fell out with Wałęsa and the Kaczyński brothers, rejecting their influence and pursuing a liberal and reformist course for Poland.

=== Founding ===
The Movement was founded on 16 July 1990 as a faction within the Citizens' Parliamentary Club by its reformist members, which supported Mazowiecki. It often collaborated with two different factions of Solidarność, Mazowiecki's Democratic Union (UD) and Aleksander Hall's Forum of the Democratic Right.

The party declared itself as a counterforce to the Centre Agreement, primarily clashing on the issue of PZPR within the Sejm. While PC wanted to sideline the communists and later post-communists, ROAD were open to cooperation with reformists and liberals within PZPR. Before ROAD's formal founding, its future members sought to establish a coalition between Solidarność and PZPR's reformist wing. During the first lustration proceedings in the first Sejm, members of the Democratic Union (UD) and Liberal Democratic Congress (KLD), which derived from ROAD, were, along the post-communists, lustration's only opponents.

=== In opposition to Wałęsa ===
Lech Wałesa planned to see himself elected President by the National Assembly (a joint sitting of the Sejm and Senate). However, in September 1990, ROAD blocked Wałęsa's initiative, and forced through a general presidential election, which occurred two months later. Despite declaring itself not to be part of Mazowiecki's political base, they were allies, and its leadership were among the Prime Minister's political advisors in the conflict between Mazowiecki and Wałęsa, which the latter would famously label the "War at the top" (Polish: Wojna na górze).

The 1990 Polish presidential election saw ROAD support Mazowiecki's candidacy against Wałęsa, who was backed by PC. The notoriously uncharismatic Mazowiecki was thoroughly humiliated, falling third, behind dark horse candidate Stanisław Tymiński. Tymiński was seen as a threat to the Solidarność establishment, which forced Mazowiecki to begrudgingly endorse Wałesa in the second round - which Wałęsa won with a historic 74.25% of the vote. Mazowiecki's humiliation in the first round led to his resignation on 12 January 1991.

In January 1991, ROAD held a Congress, where they elected Władysław Frasyniuk as the group's leader. It also decided to secede from the Citizens' Parliamentary Club, and form its own, the "Parliamentary Club - Democratic Union" (Polish: Klub Parlamentarny - Unia Demokratyczna).

=== Dissolution ===
Largely losing relevance following Mazowiecki's resignation, on 11 May 1991, the group merged, alongside FPD, into the Democratic Union, to contest the 1991 Polish parliamentary election as one party. The Democratic Union would be the first Sejm's largest party until FPD seceded from it again later.

Left-leaning dissidents led by Zbigniew Bujak, which were against joining UD, split off and formed the social democratic Democratic-Social Movement in March 1991.

== Ideology ==
The Movement supported parliamentary democracy, political pluralism, the rule of law, separation of powers, judicial independence, restricting the powers of the state, expanded local governance. Its support was rooted in Poland's intelligentsia and middle class.

Despite attempts to distance itself from the "liberal" label, and calling for a social market economy, they supported the decisively liberal, free-market economic reforms of Leszek Balcerowicz, along with his program of mass privatization of government enterprises. However, in March 1991, they also sought to forge an agreement between trade unions and employers and the government. One of the leaders, Zbigniew Bujak, called for ROAD to adopt ideals of social democracy.

Despite not following the ideals of communism, it was also not anti-communist like the majority of Poland's political groupings at the time. It rejected the labels of leftism or rightism, instead saying it fell "to the west of center".

== Electoral results ==
=== Presidential ===
Election year	Candidate	1st round		2nd round
Election year	Candidate	# of votes	% of vote	2nd round
1990	Tadeusz Mazowiecki	2,973,264	18.08 (#3)	Supported Lech Wałęsa
