= Paweł Zalewski =

Polish politician

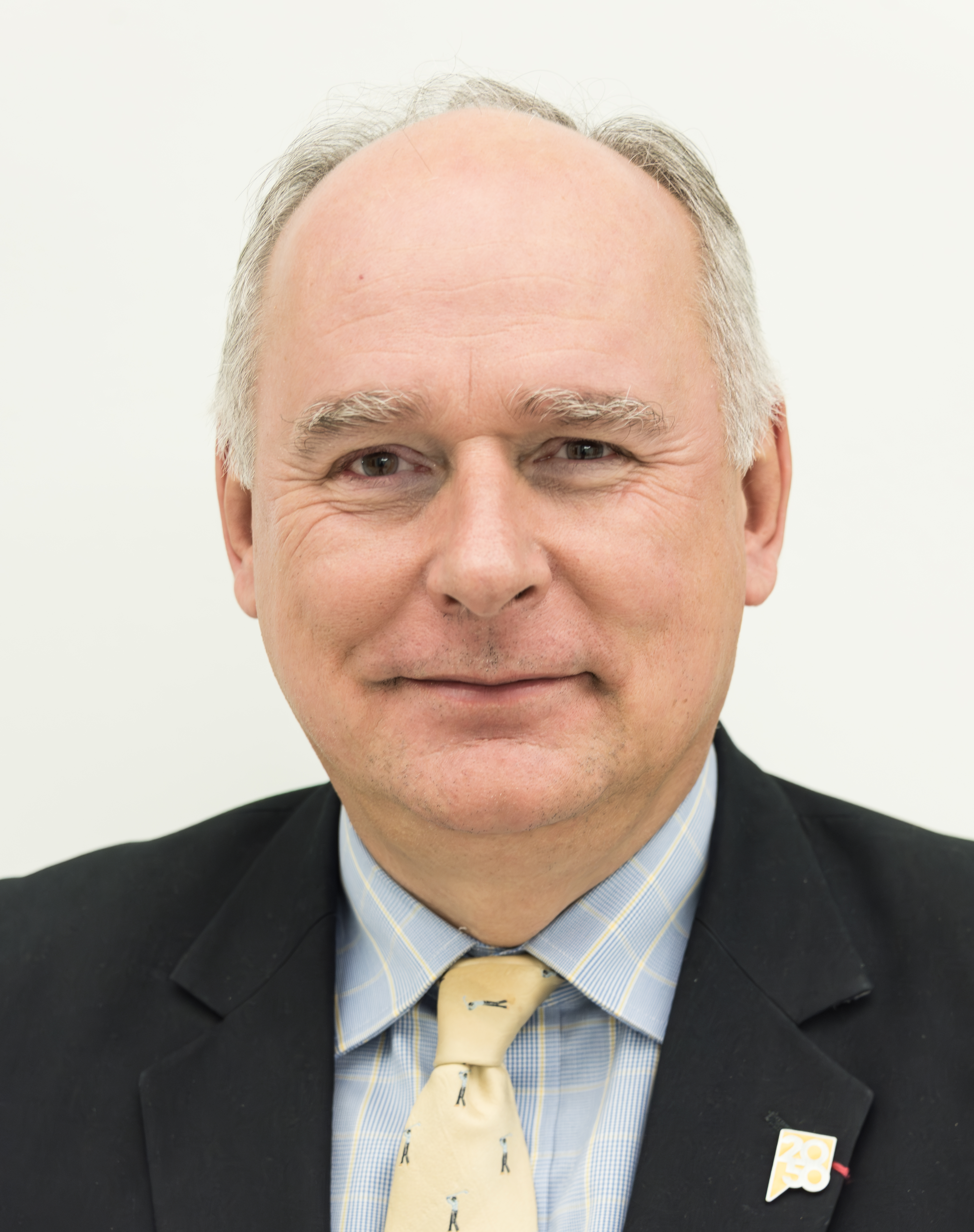
- Official portrait, 2023

Member of the Sejm
- Incumbent
- Assumed office 12 November 2019
- Constituency: 20 – Warsaw II
- In office 18 October 2005 – 5 November 2007
- Constituency: 11 – Sieradz
- In office 25 November 1991 – 14 October 1993
- Constituency: 26 – Siedlce

Member of the European Parliament for Warsaw
- In office 14 July 2009 – 30 June 2014

Personal details
- Born: Paweł Ksawery Zalewski; 25 September 1964 (age 62) Warsaw, Poland
- Party: Independent (2021, 2026–present)
- Other political affiliations: Forum of the Democratic Right (1990–1991); Democratic Union (1991–1992); Conservative Party (1992–1993); Conservative Coalition (1994–1999); Conservative People's Party (1999–2001); Right Alliance (2001–2002); Law and Justice (2002–2007); Civic Platform (2009–2021); Poland 2050 (2021–2026)
- Spouse: Kinga Zalewska (m. 2018)
- Children: 2
- Education: University of Warsaw
- Profession: Politician

Paweł Ksawery Zalewski (born 25 September 1964 in Warsaw) is a Polish politician and unaffiliated member of the Sejm and the European Parliament. He has been a member of the Sejm from 1991—1993, 2005—2007, and 2019—2023 Until May 2021, he was affiliated with Civic Platform (PO).

== Early life ==
Zalewski grew up in Żoliborz, son of Jerzy Zalewski, an Operation Storm veteran. His grandfather fought as part of the Legions, his grandmother was involved in the Polish Socialist Party, and his paternal great-uncle was Major Antoni Jabłoński, commander of the 11th Legions Uhlan Regiment. His family is from the Świętokrzyskie Province near Bodzentyn.

During high school, he became a School Olympiad academic laureate in history and was admitted to University of Warsaw's School of History without taking entrance examinations. While at university, he joined the Forum of the Democratic Right, also known as the Democratic Union. Zalewski completed his Master's degree, also at the University of Warsaw, in 1990; his thesis was centered on Polish diplomats during the early days of the Polish Ministry of Foreign Affairs.

== Career ==
In 1991, Zalewski was elected to the Sejm as a Democratic Union party member in the 26 Siedlce electorical district. He was elected again on 25 September 2005 as part of the Law and Justice platform with 14,068 votes in the 11 Sieradz district. During his term, he served as the deputy chairman of the Foreign Affairs Committee. Despite being the party's vice president, he left Law and Justice in 2007 along with fellow member Kazimierz Ujazdowski after an argument with former Prime Minister Jarosław Kaczyński. He joined the Civic Platform (PO) in 2009 and was a member of the European People's Party Group by 2012. He was reelected to the Sejm in 2019 as a member of the PO with 12248 from the 20 Warsaw electoral district.

Throughout his time as an MEP, he has served on a number of committees as well as on the European Parliament. In 2009, he was a delegate for the Parliamentary Cooperation Committee; from 2009—2014, he was a delegate for Iran–Poland relations and the Euronest Parliamentary Assembly; and from 2010—2014, he was a delegate for CARIFORUM. He served as a substitute delegate for Belarus–Poland relations and was a rapporteur of the DCFTA Agreement with Ukraine. He has also been the vice chairman of the European Parliament Committee on International Trade twice.

In 2020, he criticized Vladimir Putin for "destroying historical truth". In August 2021, he voted as an independent MEP against a proposal for increasing the president's salary. In September, still without a party, he voted in favor of aiding Afghan refugees.

=== 2021 removal from the Civic Platform ===
On 14 May 2021, Zalewski and Ireneusz Raś were removed from the Sejm at the request of the Civic Coalition (KO). They were summarily removed from PO and relieved of all committee responsibilities. The ejection occurred after Zalewski and Raś signed a letter along with several senators and 49 other MEPs from PO and KO calling for a change in leadership within the coalition. Both appealed their respective removal, which the PO defended by criticizing Zalewski for sharing his contrary opinions with the media but refusing to speak up during diplomatic meetings during his years as a Sejm member. The formal hearing has been postponed twice and is currently scheduled for 29 September 2021.

== Selected honors ==
Award	Award Body	Year	Ref
Order of the Star of Italian Solidarity	Italy	2006	
Legion of Honour	France	2007	
Presidential Order of Excellence	Georgia	2013	

== Personal life ==
Zalewski and his ex-wife have two daughters. In 2018, he married Kinga Sitarska and lost his mother. In December 2020, his father died of COVID-19, age 93.
