= Łódź Voivodeship (1975–1998) =

Former administrative unit in Poland (1975–1998)

Łódź Voivodeship Województwo łódzkie
- Voivodeship of Polish People's Republic and Third Republic of Poland
- 1975–1998
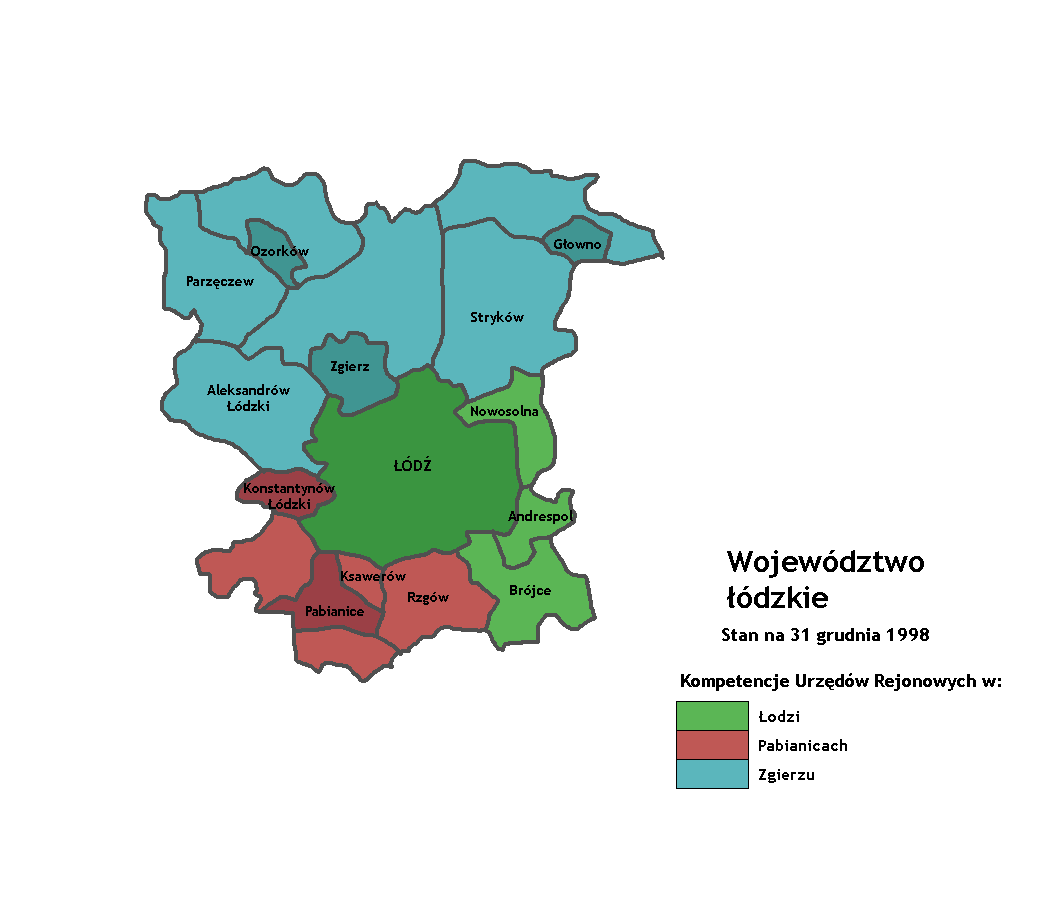
- Map of the Voivodeship on 31 December 1998 divided into gminas
- Capital: Łódź
- Area
  - 1997: 1,524 km^{2} (588 sq mi)
- Population
  - 1975: 1,079,200
  - 1997: 1,105,400
- Government
  - Type: Voivodeship
- Voivode
  - 1973–1978 (first): Jerzy Lorens
  - 1997 (last): Mirosław Marcisz
- History
  - Established: 1 June 1975
  - Renamed Łódź Urban Voivodeship (Województwo miejskie łódzkie): 1975-1984
  - Disestablished: 31 December 1998
- Contained within
  - Country: Polish People's Republic (1975–1989); Third Republic of Poland (1989–1998)
- Political subdivisions: 19 gminas (1997)
Preceded by	Succeeded by
Łódź Voivodeship	Łódź Voivodeship

The Łódź Voivodeship was one of Poland's 49 voivodeships that existed between 1975 and 1998. It was the smallest voivodeship in terms of land area. It was located in central Poland, bordering with Skierniewice, Płock, Sieradz and Piotrków voivodeships. After administrative reforms, since 1999, it was fully incorporated into the bigger contemporary Łódz Voivodeship. Its authorities were seated in Łódź.

Between 1 June 1975 and 30 June 1984, it was called the Łódź Urban Voivodeship.

== Voivodes ==
Until 1990, the Voivode of Łódź was the mayor of Łódz.

- Jerzy Lorens 1973–1978 (PZPR)
- Józef Niewiadomski 1978–1985 (PZPR)
- Jarosław Pietrzyk 1985–1989 (PZPR)
- Waldemar Bohdanowicz 1989–1994 (bezpartyjny)
- Andrzej Pęczak 1994 – IV 1997 (SLD/SdRP)
- Mirosław Marcisz IV – XII 1997 (SLD/SdRP)

== Regional offices ==
- Regional Office in Łódz for gminas: Andrespol, Brójce, Nowosolna and cities: Łódź
- Regional Office in Pabianice for gminas: Pabianice, Ksawerów (since 1 January 1997) and Rzgów and cities: Konstantynów Łódzki and Pabianice
- Regional Office in Zgierz for gminas: Aleksandrów Łódzki, Głowno, Ozorków, Parzęczew, Stryków i Zgierz and cities: Aleksandrów Łódzki (since 1 February 1991), Głowno, Ozorków, Stryków (until 1 January 1992) and Zgierz

== Cities ==
On 31 December 1998, the population of the Voivodeship's cities was:

- Łódź – 806 728
- Pabianice – 75 008
- Zgierz – 59 015
- Ozorków – 21 813
- Aleksandrów Łódzki – 20 417
- Konstantynów Łódzki – 17 645
- Głowno – 15 858
- Stryków – 3618

== Demographics ==
Year	Residents (in thousands)
1975 (31 December)	1079,2
1976 (31 December)	1092,9
1977 (31 December)	1102,9
1978	1111,1
1978 (31 December)	1112,8
1979 (31 December)	1121,2
1980 (31 December)	1127,8
1983 (31 December)	1146,5
1985 (31 December)	1149,1
1986	1149,7
1987	1148,4
1988	1141,1
1989 (31 December)	1142,7
1990 (30 June)	1141,1
1990 (31 December)	1139,5
1991 (31 December)	1136,6
1992 (31 December)	1130,7
1993 (30 June)	1128,1
1994 (31 December)	1121,2
1995 (30 June)	1118,2
1995 (31 December)	1116,2
1997 (31 December)	1105,4
