= BBWR =

The initials BBWR relate to two distinct Polish political organizations:

- Bezpartyjny Blok Współpracy z Rządem (Polish for "Nonpartisan Bloc for Cooperation with the Government") was an ostensibly non-political organization that existed from 1928 to 1935, closely affiliated with Józef Piłsudski and his Sanation movement.
- Bezpartyjny Blok Wspierania Reform (Polish for "Nonpartisan Bloc for Support of Reforms") was an ostensibly non-political organization (but in reality a political party) affiliated with Lech Wałęsa. It was established in 1993, and in 1997 became part of Solidarity Electoral Action.
