= Tadeusz Koźluk =

Polish lawyer

Tadeusz Koźluk (born 16 August 1930 in Konstantynów, died 1 October 2019 in Warsaw) was a Polish jurist, lawyer, and candidate for President of Poland in 1995.

== Biography ==
He was the son of Józef and Aleksandra. He graduated the Faculty of Law and Administration of the Jagiellonian University, where he also became a doctor.

He worked in the United Nations Commission on Human Rights and was an advisor for the government of Iran. He then lived in the United States. He returned to the country in 1991. He founded the Independent University of Business and Public Administration in Warsaw, where he became a rector. He was a candidate in the 1995 presidential election, where he earned 27,259 votes (0.15%), which put him at 11th place out of 13 candidates.

He is buried at the Powiązki MIlitary Cemetery.

== Publications ==
- Powrót do Itaki – eseje polityczne (1995)
- Rzeczpospolita – jaka? (1995)

== Bibliography ==
- Biogram at the PWSBiA page
- "Tadeusz Koźluk". Information Processing Centre database (in Polish).
