= Jerzy Dietl =

Polish economist and politician (1927–2021)

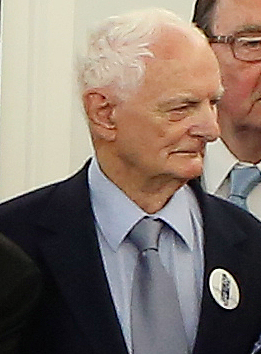
Jerzy Dietl

Jerzy Dietl (28 April 1927 – 23 February 2021) was a Polish economist and politician who served as a Senator from 1989 to 1991.
