= Tomasz Wołek =

Polish sports journalist (1947–2022)

Tomasz Wołek (14 October 1947 – 21 September 2022) was a Polish sports journalist and writer.

Wołek attended the University of Gdańsk and graduated with a degree in history.

== Books ==
- Copa America
- Mexico Catolico

== Awards ==
- Kisiel Prize (1997)
- Knight's Cross of the Order of Polonia Restituta (2011)
