= Korytnica, Greater Poland Voivodeship =

Korytnica
- Village
- Location within Poland
- Coordinates: 51°46′N 17°43′E
- Country: Poland
- Voivodeship: Greater Poland
- County: Ostrów
- Gmina: Raszków

Korytnica [kɔrɨtˈnit͡sa] is a village in the administrative district of Gmina Raszków, within Ostrów County, Greater Poland Voivodeship, in west-central Poland.
