= Kazimierz Olesiak =

Polish politician, engineer and activist

Kazimierz Olesiak (born 22 February 1937, in Huta Drewniana) is a Polish politician, engineer and activist. He was the deputy prime minister and Minister of Agriculture, Forestry and Food Economy in Mieczysław Rakowski's government (1988–1989), for half a year (1989–1990) he was president of the Supreme Executive Committee of the Polish People's Party "Odrodzenie".

== Biography ==
He comes from a peasant family. In the years 1954–1956 he worked as a tutor in an orphanage in Chorzenice, he then graduated from the Warsaw University of Life Sciences in 1961. After graduation he worked briefly in the party of the Provincial Committee of the ZSL in Lodz (he joined this party in 1959), in 1962 he became a research worker at the Warsaw University of Life Sciences. In the years 1963–1967 he completed doctoral studies at the Polish Academy of Sciences, and in 1974 he was habilitated in the field of agricultural and forestry sciences. In the mid-1970s, he worked as a FAO expert in Sri Lanka; in addition, he held positions in the ZSL party and government (including advisor and director of the cabinet of the vice president of the Council of Ministers, deputy head of the Presidential Department of the Supreme Committee of the ZSL).

In the years 1982–1984 he was the Undersecretary of State (Deputy Minister) in the Ministry of Finance and from 1981 to 1985, he was the Secretary of the Council of Food Economy of the Council of Ministers. In 1985, he sat in the Sejm and took the post of chairman of the Committee on Agriculture, Forestry and Food Economy (until November 1988). In October 1988 he was appointed vice-president of the Council of Ministers, minister of agriculture, forestry and food economy, and chairman of the Council of Food Economy. He served these functions until the end of the Mieczysław F. Rakowski's cabinet on 1 August 1989. He was a representative of the government party in the team for economy and social policy during the round table discussions .

He was one of the leading figures of the people's movement in the period of political transformation. From November 1989 to May 1990 he headed the Supreme Executive Committee of the Polish People's Party (he was also a member of the Supreme Council), and from May 1990 he was a member of the Supreme Council of the new PSL. In the years 1994–1998 he was the president of BGZ Bank. In 2011 he became a member of the honorary committee for celebrating the 80th anniversary of the "Zielony Sztandar".

He was awarded the Golden Cross of Merit, Knight's and Officer's Cross of the Order of Polonia Restituta and badges.
