= Piotr Krzywicki =

Polish politician (1964–2009)

Piotr Jacek Krzywicki (born 22 October 1964, Poddębice; died 9 December 2009, Łódź) was a Polish politician. From 1998 to 2001, he served on Łódź's city council.

He was elected to the Sejm on 25 September 2005, winning 19944 votes in Łódź's 9th district, representing the Law and Justice party until 5 November 2007, when he switched political parties, joining Polish Plus, where he would remain until his death in 2009.

Krzywicki graduated from law school at the University of Łódź. He was also a member of Sejm 2001-2005.

== Death ==
He died on 9 December 2009, aged 45, from pancreatic cancer.

== See also ==
- Members of Polish Sejm 2005-2007
