= Hanna Gronkiewicz-Waltz =

Polish politician and lawyer

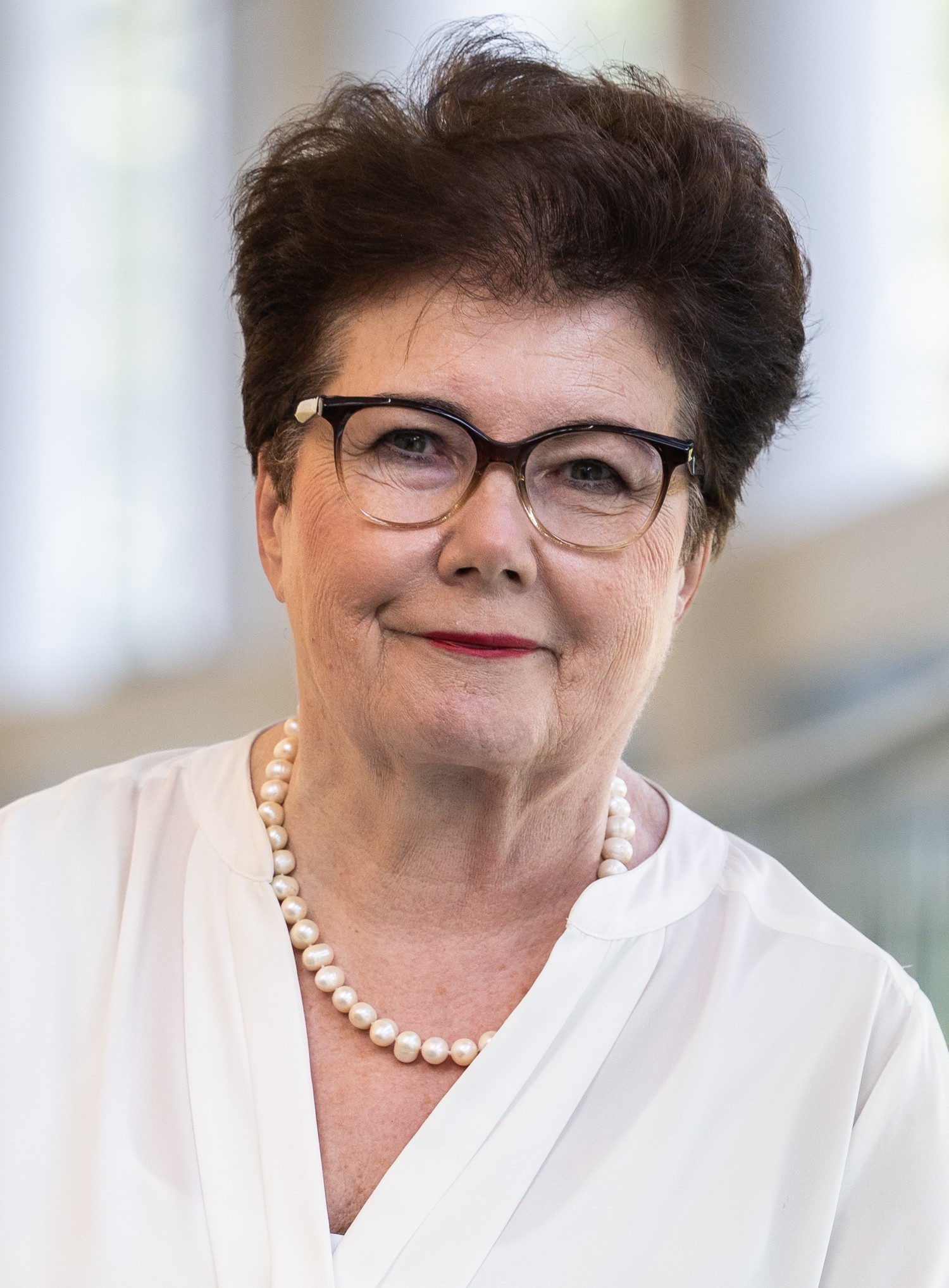
- Official portrait, 2025

Member of the European Parliament for Poland
- Incumbent
- Assumed office 10 October 2024
- Constituency: Warsaw

Mayor of Warsaw
- In office 2 December 2006 – 22 November 2018
- Preceded by: Lech Kaczyński; Kazimierz Marcinkiewicz (Acting)
- Succeeded by: Rafał Trzaskowski

Member of the Sejm
- In office 26 October 2005 – 26 November 2006
- Constituency: Warsaw I

Vice President of the European Bank for Reconstruction and Development
- In office July 2001 – July 2004
- President: Jean Lemierre

President of the National Bank of Poland
- In office 5 March 1992 – 31 December 2000
- Preceded by: Andrzej Topiński (Acting)
- Succeeded by: Leszek Balcerowicz

Personal details
- Born: Hanna Beata Gronkiewicz; 4 November 1952 (age 73) Warsaw, Poland
- Party: Civic Platform (since 2005)
- Other political affiliations: Civic Coalition (since 2018)
- Spouse: Andrzej Waltz
- Education: University of Warsaw
- Awards: Order of Polonia Restituta Cross of Merit (Poland) Legion of Honour Order of the Polar Star Order of the Crown (Belgium)

Hanna Beata Gronkiewicz-Waltz (Polish pronunciation: [ˈxanna bɛˈata ɡrɔnˈkʲɛvid͡ʐ ˈvalt͡s], born 4 November 1952) is a Polish politician and lawyer, Professor of Jurisprudence and politician who served as the city mayor of Warsaw between 2006 and 2018. She is the first and so far only woman to have held this position.

== Life and career ==
Between 1992 and 2000, she was the chairman of the National Bank of Poland, the central bank of Poland. She resigned to take the position of the deputy chairman of European Bank for Reconstruction and Development, a position she held between 2001 and 2004. Gronkiewicz-Waltz was elected to the Sejm on 25 September 2005 after receiving 137,280 votes in the 19th Warsaw district, running on the Civic Platform list. In the 2006 municipal elections, Gronkiewicz-Waltz served as Civic Platform's nominee for mayor of Warsaw. On 12 November she gained 34.23%, finishing next to Law and Justice candidate, former prime minister Kazimierz Marcinkiewicz. As neither received 50 percent of the vote, a second round election was held on 26 November, where Gronkiewicz-Waltz received 53.18% of the votes, winning the election.

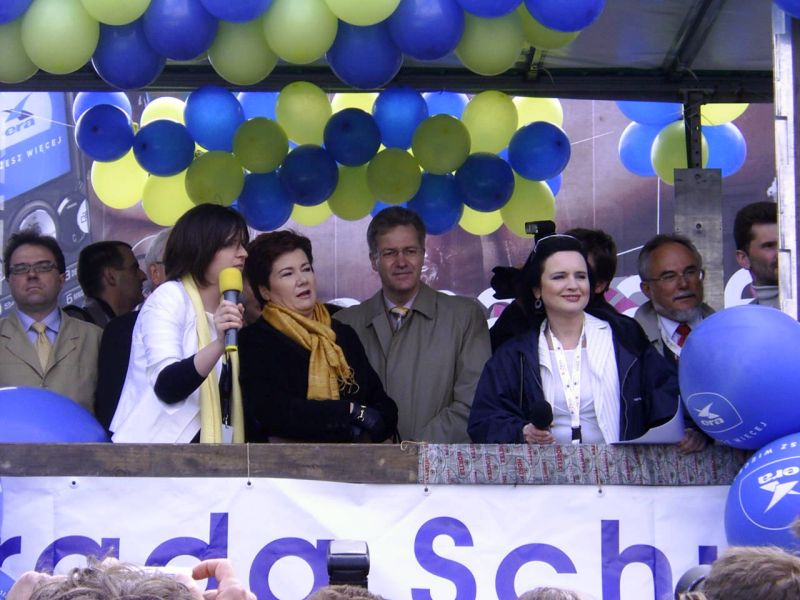
Gronkiewicz-Waltz in 2007

In January 2007, just a few weeks into her term, Gronkiewicz-Waltz was at the center of a controversy that could have cost her the office. A law enacted in 2005 obliged the mayors of Polish municipalities to publicly disclose their own as well as their spouse's financial circumstances. The law requires the successful candidate's disclosure statement to be provided within 30 days after the inauguration, whereas the statement regarding the candidate's spouse is to be submitted within 30 days after the actual election. Gronkiewicz-Waltz submitted her own and her husband's statements on 2 January 2007, exactly 30 days after her inauguration. On 20 January, the newspaper Dziennik reported that Mr Waltz's documents had been two days past the deadline, which in his case had been on 28 December 2006. Based on this, Prime Minister Jarosław Kaczyński of the governing Law and Justice (PiS) party maintained that Gronkiewicz-Waltz's mandate had expired on 28 December 2006, and announced that the local elections would be repeated. Gronkiewicz-Waltz's party Civic Platform argued that the prime minister did not have the authority to make this decision, and that the case would need to be examined in court instead. Polish legal experts maintained that by submitting their statements on the same day, Gronkiewicz-Waltz had observed the spirit, if not the letter of the law. Also, having two different deadlines for the statements could be considered as an unconstitutional legal trap. In the meantime, Civic Platform announced that it would nominate Gronkiewicz-Waltz again, should the elections need to be repeated. On 13 March 2007, Poland's Constitutional Tribunal ruled against the governing Law and Justice party and struck down the controversial law that threatened her and many other public officials with the loss of their positions solely because they did not file paperwork on time.

Regarding the Equality Parade for LGBT rights in the capital, Gronkiewicz-Waltz has taken the opposite stand to her predecessor, approving it. Though equality marches have been officially allowed in the past, they had always met with strong resistance during the term of Lech Kaczyński as Mayor of Warsaw, particularly from the All-Polish Youth movement. Gronkiewicz-Waltz said the parade would pose no threat to morals and pointed to the Bączkowski v Poland ruling by the European Court of Human Rights that Kaczyński had acted illegally and discriminatorily in banning the 2005 Equality Parade.

In the November 2010 municipal elections, Gronkiewicz-Waltz was re-elected as the mayor (or "president") of Warsaw, winning 53.67% of the votes outright in the first round, making a second round unnecessary. In 2024, she became member of the European Parliament, representing European People's Party Group.

Gronkiewicz-Waltz is a Fellow of Collegium Invisibile as a professor of economics.

She was born in Warsaw.

== Selected awards ==
- Silver Cross of Merit (1990, Poland)
- Officer of the Legion of Honour (France, 2008)
- Commander's Cross with Star of the Order of Polonia Restituta (Poland, 2010)
- Order of the Polar Star (Sweden, 2011)
- Order of the Crown (Belgium, 2011)

== See also ==
- Members of Polish Sejm 2005–2007

Civic offices
Preceded by Andrzej Topiński; Acting	President of the National Bank; 1992–2001	Succeeded by Leszek Balcerowicz
Political offices
Preceded by Kazimierz Marcinkiewicz; Acting	Mayor of Warsaw; 2006–2018	Succeeded by Rafał Trzaskowski
