= Piotrków Voivodeship =

Former administrative division in Poland

Coordinates: 51°24′18″N 19°41′36″E

Piotrków Voivodeship Województwo piotrkowskie
- 1975–1998
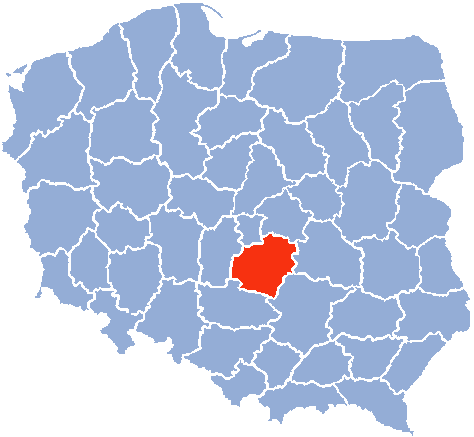
- Piotrków Voivodeship
- Capital: Piotrków Trybunalski
- History
  - Established: 1 June 1975 1975
  - Disestablished: 21 December 1998 1998
- Political subdivisions: 56 gmin
Preceded by	Succeeded by
[[Łódź Voivodeship]]	Łódź Voivodeship
- Today part of: Poland

Piotrków Voivodeship (Polish: województwo piotrkowskie) was a voivodeship, or unit of administrative division and local government, in Poland from 1975 to 1998, superseded by Łódź Voivodeship. Its capital city was Piotrków Trybunalski.

== Major cities and towns (population in 1995) ==
- Piotrków Trybunalski (81,100)
- Tomaszów Mazowiecki (70,000)
- Bełchatów (59,900)
- Radomsko (51,100)
- Opoczno (21,900)

== See also ==
- Voivodeships of Poland
