= Nonpartisan Bloc for Support of Reforms =

Nonpartisan Bloc for Support of Reforms Bezpartyjny Blok Wspierania Reform (Polish)
- Leader: Lech Wałęsa (de facto)
- Founded: 30 November 1993
- Dissolved: November 1997
- Succeeded by: Christian Democracy of the 3rd Polish Republic
- Headquarters: Warsaw, Poland
- Ideology: Christian democracy Conservatism; Populism
- Political position: Centre-right
- National affiliation: Solidarity Electoral Action (1997)

The Nonpartisan Bloc for Support of Reforms (Polish: Bezpartyjny Blok Wspierania Reform, BBWR) was an officially nonpartisan organization (but, in fact, a political party) affiliated with Lech Wałęsa. The party was established in 1993, and became part of Solidarity Electoral Action in 1997.

It was founded to continue the traditions of Józef Piłsudski's pre-war Nonpartisan Bloc for Cooperation with the Government (Bezpartyjny Blok Współpracy z Rządem), which likewise had been known by the same initials, BBWR.

After local electoral losses in 1994, Wałęsa issued a statement that invoked comparisons with Piłsudski, who had become dictator of Poland: "When the time comes to introduce a dictatorship, the people will force me to accept this role, and I shall not refuse."

== History ==
BBWR was judicially registered on 30 November 1993 as a political association.

At the founders' meeting on 7 January 1994, Zbigniew Religa was appointed chairman. He served as chairman until the convention of the association. In November of the same year, he resigned and left the BBWR and was replaced as head of the association by Jerzy Gwiżdż.

The Nonpartisan Bloc for Support of Reforms was a political formation intended to form a backbench in the new parliament for the President of Poland, who hoped that his grouping would obtain at least 25% of the vote. At the time of its formation, a Demoskop poll gave the association the support of 18% of respondents.

As a result of the parliamentary elections held on 19 September 1993, BBWR received 746,653 votes, i.e. 5.41% support, which translated into 18 parliamentary seats (16 Sejm seats and 2 Senate seats). Already at that time Lech Wałęsa began to distance himself from his new formation.

In the 1995 Polish presidential election, the grouping worked towards Lech Wałęsa's re-election. Wałęsa played an anti-communist note during the first round of presidential elections, presenting himself as an anti-communist hero, a person who "had led the Russian army out of Poland" and who saw his main enemy in the post-communist formation, the Democratic Left Alliance. During the campaign, Wałęsa did not attack the other candidates of the right, ignoring them or even making conciliatory gestures, as in the case of Jan Olszewski. Such a policy was in line with the slogan 'There are many candidates - Lech Wałęsa is the only one'.

Wałęsa's efficient electoral staff argued that only Wałęsa is capable of defeating post-communist Kwaśniewski. This message resonated and allowed Wałęsa to avoid elimination in the first round, despitely disastrous polling at first. After 5 November, most right-wing parties in Poland concluded the only option was to support Lech Wałęsa, despite all reservations. The second round of the election was seen a clash of completely opposite visions of how the state should function, between an anti-communist and a post-communist candidate.

The National Executive Board of the People's Christian Party appealed for a vote for Lech Wałęsa, calling on its members and supporters, as well as all those who did not take part in the elections, to support the president. Its statement was: "Lech Wałęsa is not only supported by his merits in the victory over communism, the restoration of independence, the building of democracy and the free market. Lech Wałęsa is also supported by his political will and ability to take the initiative in deciding the fate of the country. We take a positive view of the style of the presidential campaign and the candidate's announcements, which speak not of creating a presidential party, but of helping to establish a right-wing and reform camp. The Candidate's international position and his firm commitment to NATO and the European Union is a very important argument. In view of the advantages of President Wałęsa and the dangers of electing A. Kwasniewski, who brings decommunization political tendencies, the return of systems and people of the People's Republic of Poland, we call on all voters who voted in the first round for Solidarity candidates to vote for Lech Wałęsa on 19 November. Together we have collected more than 50% of the vote. The advantage is on our side. We cannot waste it".

Ultimately however, Wałęsa lost to Kwaśniewski in the second round, losing the presidency. Political commentators observed that despite most right-wing and anti-communist parties endorsing Wałęsa, the endorsement was not followed by unity and the anti-communist camp remained extremely disunited and was mired in in-fighting. Meanwhile, Kwaśniewski did not only enjoy an almost unanimous support of post-communist voters, but also made inroads with voters opposed to the neoliberal Balcerowicz Plan and transition of Polish economy towards capitalism. The defeat of Wałęsa dealt a decisive blow to the anti-communist camp, but also defeated the main reason for existence of the Nonpartisan Block for Support of Reforms. The party split after the election.

In February 1996, Jerzy Gwiżdż was suspended, and in March he was dismissed and excluded by an extraordinary congress. He subsequently resigned from the BBWR. Jerzy Gwiżdż was succeeded by Stanisław Kowolik.

During the second term of the Polish Sejm in 1993-1997, the BBWR Parliamentary Club proved to be the most divisive club. At the end of the term, its MPs were divided into several groups:

Name	Ideological alignment	MPs	Leader
BBWR - Blok dla Polski	Christian democracy	7	Andrzej Gąsienica-Makowski
BBWR - Solidarni w Wyborach	Christian democracy	3	Jerzy Gwiżdż
Nowa Polska	Conservatism	3	-
Republicans Party	Liberal conservatism	2	Jerzy Eysymontt
National Party of Retirees and Pensioners	Democratic socialism	1	-

As a result, the former President appealed to BBWR politicians to withdraw their candidatures in the next parliamentary elections - the 1997 Polish parliamentary election, which, however, the vast majority did not do. In these elections, BBWR received 1.36% of the vote and failed to gain seats in parliament. In November of the same year, the activists of BBWR decided to transform the association into a political party called Blok dla Polski. At that time, Lech Wałęsa founded the party Christian Democracy of the Third Polish Republic (which included, among others, the former head of BBWR Jerzy Gwiżdż), whose environment ran in the elections from the Solidarity Electoral Action list.

== Ideology ==
While the party served first and foremost as a way for president Lech Wałęsa to extend his influence into the Sejm and thus broadly included his political supporters, the BBWR had a clear ideology. It was considered a part of the Polish family of conservative and Christian Democratic parties, with the common link between such parties being a dislike for post-communist organizations. The party put emphasis on the importance of religion and the Catholic Church in public life, campaigned on 'traditionalism' and 'family values', and evoked Polish nationalism.

Because the party was formed with the aim of expanding presidential influence in parliament, it became a grouping promoting the presidential system at the expense of the parliamentary one. The program of the party had two distinct ideological currents. It heavily evoked and pledged allegiance to Catholic values, and was placed within the family of Christian Democratic parties. On the other hand, it promoted economic proposals such as the idea of giving expansive loans on beneficial conditions to every citizen, which placed the party among the populist ones. Polish political scientist Marek Migalski described the party as partway between liberalism and rigorism, which nevertheless occupied a position closer to religious values and conservatism.

== See also ==
- Nonpartisan Bloc for Cooperation with the Government
- Confederation of Independent Poland
