= Social Democracy of the Republic of Poland =

Polish political party

Social Democracy of the Republic of Poland Socjaldemokracja Rzeczypospolitej Polskiej
- Leader: Aleksander Kwaśniewski
- Founded: 28 January 1990
- Dissolved: 15 April 1999
- Preceded by: Polish United Workers' Party (de facto)
- Merged into: Democratic Left Alliance
- Headquarters: Warsaw
- Ideology: Social democracy
- Political position: Centre-left
- National affiliation: Democratic Left Alliance (1990–1999)
- International affiliation: Socialist International (1996–1999)
- Colours: White and Red

Website
- sdrp.org.pl (archived)

Social Democracy of the Republic of Poland (Polish: Socjaldemokracja Rzeczypospolitej Polskiej, SdRP) was a social democratic political party in Poland created in 1990, shortly after the Revolutions of 1989. The party was the main party of the successor parties to the Polish United Workers' Party (PZPR).

Among the creators and leading figures of SdRP were the former Polish president Aleksander Kwaśniewski, former speaker of the Sejm Józef Oleksy and former Prime Minister Leszek Miller. The SdRP's name was a paraphrase of the late 19th century Social Democracy of the Kingdom of Poland and Lithuania (SdKPiL), a party which was the direct predecessor of the Communist Party of Poland.

On 15 April 1999, the SdRP was folded into the Democratic Left Alliance.

== Election results ==
=== Sejm ===
Election year	Leader	# of votes	% of vote	# of overall seats won	+/–
1991	Aleksander Kwaśniewski	1,344,820	12.0 (#2)	45 / 460	
1991	As part of the Democratic Left Alliance coalition, which won 60 seats in total.				
1993	Aleksander Kwaśniewski	2,815,169	20.4 (#1)	76 / 460	▲31
1993	As part of the Democratic Left Alliance coalition, which won 171 seats in total.				
1997	Leszek Miller	3,551,224	27.1 (#2)	97 / 460	▲15
1997	As part of the Democratic Left Alliance coalition, which won 164 seats in total.				
