= Aleksander Hall =

Polish politician and historian (born 1953)

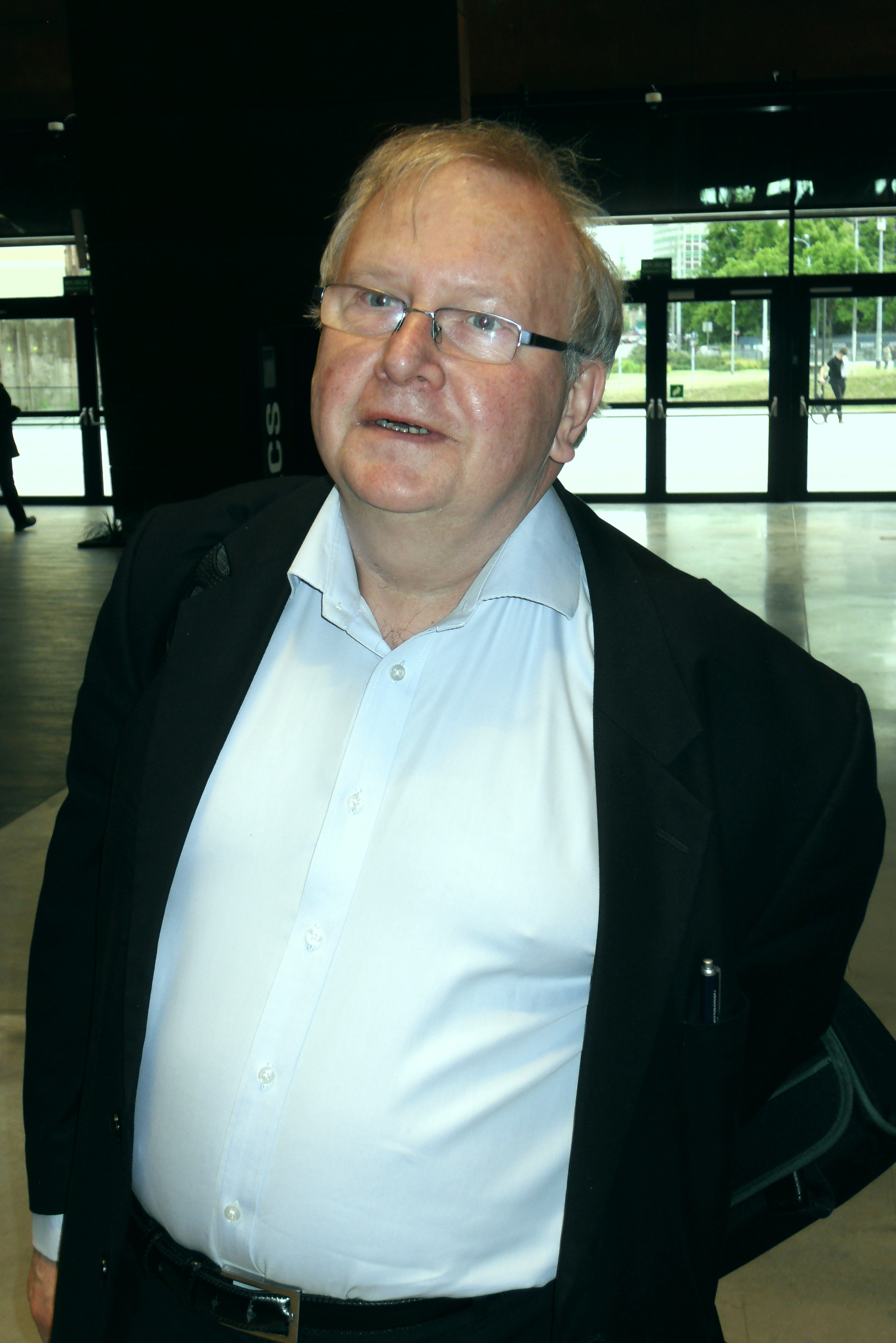
Aleksander Hall

Aleksander Jan Hall (born 20 May 1953 in Gdańsk) is a Polish conservative political thinker, scholar and retired politician. He was an activist for the Movement for Defense of Human and Civic Rights, and later a politician and member of Solidarity Electoral Action. He has authored books and articles on history, patriotism, etc., quitting politics in 2001 to focus on research. He is married to Katarzyna Hall.

He identifies as a conservative liberal. He endorsed the Third Way before the 2023 Polish parliamentary election.
