= Battle of Bukowiec =

Battle

- Part of the Battle of the Border of the Invasion of Poland
Date	3 September 1939
Location	Bukowiec, Świecie County
Result	German victory

Belligerents
Germany	Poland

Commanders and leaders
Leo Geyr von Schweppenburg	Julian Arnoldt-Russocki; Janusz Pasturak

Units involved
3rd Panzer Division (Wehrmacht) 23rd Motorized Infantry Regiment	16th Greater Poland Uhlan Regiment 2nd battery of the 11th horse artillery squadron

The Battle of Bukowiec was fought on September 3, 1939 near the village of Bukowiec in Poland. The 16th Greater Poland Uhlan Regiment under the command of Lt. Col. Julian Arnoldt-Russocki, supported by the 2nd battery of the 11th horse artillery squadron under the command of Capt. Janusz Pasturak went up against the Wehrmacht 3rd Panzer Division supported by a unit of the 23rd Motorized Infantry Regiment and seventeen Luftwaffe bombers.

== Prelude ==
On September 3 at At 5:00 the 16th Greater Poland Uhlans Regiment, despite significant shortages in manpower and armament, sets off towards Poledno - Gruczno. The commander of the regiment, Lt. Col. Arnoldt-Russocki, receives an order to "Insure the retreating brigade towards the town of Bukowiec. To break away from the enemy not earlier than at 12:00". On the way, about 2 km from Bukowiec, in the town of Bramka, he encounters the 2nd battery of the 11th horse artillery squadron under the command of Capt. Janusz Pasturczak. After a short conversation, the captain himself suggested joint actions so that, as he writes in his memoirs, "not to stand idle while others are fighting".

== The battle ==
The 16th Regiment takes up positions along the railroad tracks, awaiting an enemy attack. Sends a reconnaissance that reports a large (about 100 vehicles) group of Wehrmacht tanks in Polskie Łąki (about 3 km from the battle site). The 2nd battery of the 11th DAC took its place at the rail-road crossing in front of the German troops. Immediately after receiving the report, the first vehicles appeared on the horizon. The first attack is repulsed and the 3rd Panzer Division loses 15 tanks. The 2nd battery of the 11th Dak, which destroyed almost half of the enemy units performed exceptionally well. The Germans then launch a second attack larger than the first and Luftwaffe bombers support the attack causing heavy Polish losses. Losses were growing at an alarming rate and the Polish army lost both its radio stations. After 12 o'clock, Lt Col. Arnoldt-Russocki ordered a withdrawal from the battlefield.

== Aftermath ==
During the battle in the area of the village of Bukowiec and in the vicinity 131 soldiers from the 16th Regiment of Greater Poland Lancers died in the fight against the Nazi invaders. As of 2008 one Polish soldier who fought in the battle might possibly have been alive and may still be in 2021.

== See also ==
- List of World War II military equipment of Poland
- List of German military equipment of World War II
