= Warsaw Voivodeship (1944–1975) =

Former voivodeship of Poland

- Voivodeship of Poland
- 1944–1975
- The Warsaw Voivodeship within Poland, between 1950 and 1975.
- Capital: Warsaw
- Area
  - 1947: 28,999 km^{2} (11,197 sq mi)
  - 1970: 29,410 km^{2} (11,360 sq mi)
- Population
  - 1946: 2 114 415
  - 1974: 2 558 000
- History
  - Established: 22 August 1944
  - Disestablished: 31 May 1975
- Contained within
  - Country: Provisional Government of the Republic of Poland (1944–1945); Provisional Government of National Unity (1945–1947); Polish People's Republic (1947–1975)
Preceded by
General Government
Succeeded by
Biała Podlaska Voivodeship
Białystok Voivodeship
Ciechanów Voivodeship
Lublin Voivodeship
Łomża Voivodeship
Ostrołęka Voivodeship
Płock Voivodeship
Radom Voivodeship
Siedlce Voivodeship
Skierniewice Voivodeship
Warsaw Capital Voivodeship

The Warsaw Voivodeship (Note: Polish: Województwo warszawskie) was a voivodeship (province) of the Polish People's Republic, with its capital in Warsaw, that was located in Masovia. It was established on 22 August 1944, and until 28 June 1945, it remained under the administration of the Provisional Government of the Republic of Poland, which then was replaced by the Provisional Government of National Unity. On, 19 February 1947, the provisional government was replaced by the Polish People's Republic. It existed until 31 May 1975, when it was partitioned into the voivodeships of Biała Podlaska, Białystok, Ciechanów, Lublin, Łomża, Ostrołęka, Płock, Radom, Siedlce, Skierniewice, and Warsaw Capital.

== History ==
The Warsaw Voivodeship within Poland, between 1946 and 1950.

The Warsaw Voivodeship was established on 22 August 1944, by the Provisional Government of the Republic of Poland, within the borders of the Warsaw Voivodeship of the Second Polish Republic, that existed from 1919 to 1939. It replaced the subdivisions of the General Government. Its capital was located in the city of Warsaw, which itself, functioned as the separate city voivodeship. On 28 June 1945 the Provisional Government of the Republic of Poland had been replaced by the Provisional Government of National Unity, and on the 19 February 1947, the provisional government was replaced by the Polish People's Republic.

On 18 August 1945, the Łomża County, was ceded to the Białystok Voivodeship. In 1946 it had a population of 2 114 415 people, and in 1947, it had an area of 28 999 km^{2}. On 12 March 1948, the Błonie County was replaced by the Grodzisk Mazowiecki County. On 1 January 1949, the city of Siedlce, and the Siedlce County, were incorporated into the voivodeship, from the Lublin Voivodeship. On 1 July 1952, the Warsaw County, was partitioned into the counties of Piaseczno, Pruszków, Nowy Dwór, and the Otwock Urban-Spa County. The Radzymin County was replaced by the Wołomin County. On 1 January 1956 were created the counties of Łosice, Ryki, Wyszków, and Żuromin. In 1956, it had an area of 29 421 km^{2}. On 1 January 1958, the Otwock Urban-Spa County had been partitioned into the city county of Otwock and the Otwock County. In 1970, it had an area of 29 410 km^{2}, and in 1974, it had a population of 2 558 000 people.

The voivodeship existed until 31 May 1975, when it was partitioned into the voivodeships of Biała Podlaska, Białystok, Ciechanów, Lublin, Łomża, Ostrołęka, Płock, Radom, Siedlce, Skierniewice, and Warsaw Capital.

== Subdivisions ==
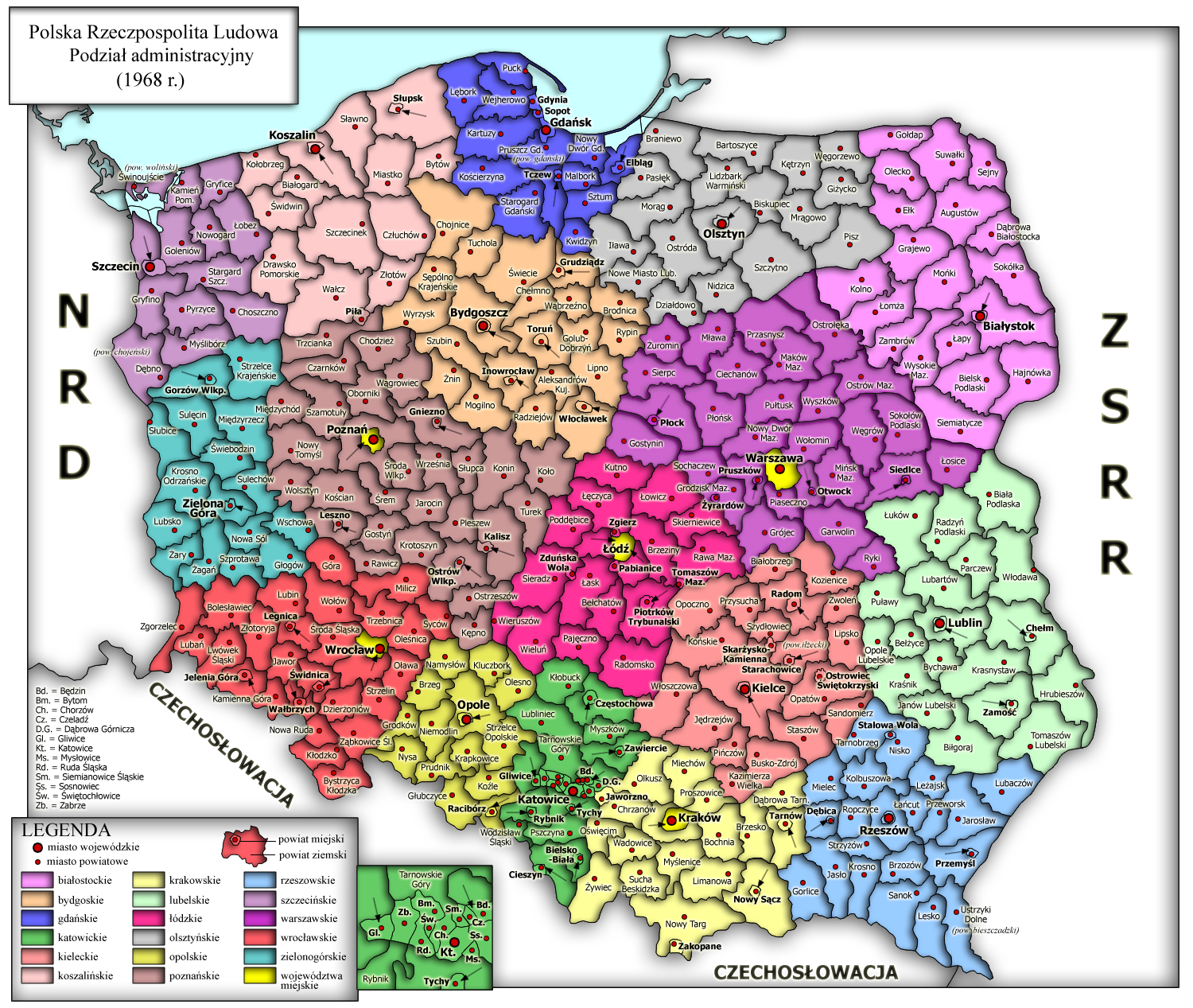
The counties of Poland in 1968, including the counties of the Warsaw Voivodeship.

The voivodeship was divided into counties. Over the years, those were:

- Błonie County (seat: Grodzisk Mazowiecki; 1944–1948);
- Ciechanów County (seat: Ciechanów);
- Działdowo County (seat: Działdowo);
- Garwolin County (seat: Garwolin);
- Grodzisk Mazowiecki County (seat: Grodzisk Mazowiecki; 1948–1975);
- Gostynin County (seat: Gostynin);
- Grójec County (seat: Grójec);
- Łosice County (seat: Łosice; 1956–1975);
- Łomża County (seat: Łomża; 1944–1945);
- Maków County (seat: Maków Mazowiecki);
- Mińsk County (seat: Mińsk Mazowiecki);
- Mława County (seat: Mława);
- Nowy Dwór County (seat: Nowy Dwór Mazowiecki; 1952–1975);
- Ostrołęka County (seat: Ostrołęka);
- Ostrów County (seat: Ostrów Mazowiecka);
- Otwock (city county; 1958–1975);
- Otwock County (seat: Otwock; 1958–1975);
- Otwock Urban-Spa County (seat: Otwock; 1952–1958);
- Płock (city county);
- Płock County (seat: Płock)
- Płońsk County (seat: Płońsk)
- Piaseczno County (seat: Piaseczno; 1952–1975);
- Pruszków (city county);
- Pruszków County (seat: Pruszków; 1952–1975);
- Przasnysz County (seat: Przasnysz)
- Pułtusk County (seat: Pułtusk)
- Radzymin County (seat: Radzymin; 1944–1952);
- Ryki County (seat: Ryki; 1956–1975);
- Siedlce (city county; 1949–1975);
- Siedlce County (seat: Siedlce; 1949–1975);
- Sierpc County (seat: Sierpc);
- Sochaczew County (seat: Sochaczew);
- Sokołów County (seat: Sokołów Podlaski);
- Warsaw County (seat: Warsaw; 1944–1952);
- Węgrów County (seat: Węgrów);
- Wołomin County (seat: Wołomin); 1956–1975);
- Wyszków County (seat: Wyszków; 1952–1975);
- Żuromin County (seat: Żuromin; 1956–1975);
- Żyrardów (city county);

== Demographics ==
Year	Population		
Year	Total	Urban (%)	Rural (%)
1946	2 114 415	360 585 (17.05%)	1 753 830 (82.95%)
1950	2 042 425	420 334 (20.58%)	1 622 091 (79.42%)
1956	2 278 000	609 000 (26.7%)	1 669 000 (73.3%)
1960	2 314 930	728 061 (31.45%)	1 586 869 (68.55%)
1963	2 416 000	777 000 (32.2%)	1 639 000 (67.8%)
1965	2 453 000	no data	no data
1970	2 517 940	896 226 (35.59%)	1 621 714 (64.41%)
1971	2 522 800	905 000 (35.9%)	1 617 800 (64.1%)
1972	2 537 300	923 300 (36.4%)	1 614 000 (63.6%)
1973	2 542 000	947 000 (37.3%)	1 595 000 (62.7%)
1974	2 558 000	968 000 (37.8%)	1 590 000 (62.2%)

== Leaders ==
From 1944 to 1950, the leader of the voivodeship was the voivode. In 1950, the office of the voivode, together with several others, had been disestablished. As such, from 1950, to 1973, the leader was the chairperson of the Voivodeship National Council. The office of the voivode was reestablished in 1973, however it remained vacant until the disestablishment of the voivodeship in 1975.

The people in the office of the voivode, from 1944 to 1950 were:

- November 1944 – 25 February 1945: Stanisław Mazur;
- 25 February 1945 – 10 May 1945: Juliusz Goryński;
- 10 May 1945 – 10 August 1945: Michał Gwiazdowicz;
- 10 August 1945 – 15 December 1945: Stanisław Zrałek;
- 15 December 1945 – 27 March 1947: Wilhelm Garncarczyk;
- 27 March 1947 – 12 April 1947: Roman Rot;
- 12 April 1947 – 17 January 1948: Lucjusz Dura;
- 17 January 1948 – 5 February 1948: Roman Rot;
- 5 February 1947 – 27 November 1948: Henryk Kołodziejczyk;
- 27 November 1948 – February 1950 Lucjusz Dura.

The people in the office of the chairperson of the Voivodeship National Council, from 1950 to 1973, were:

- 25 May 1950 – 29 December 1952: Mieczysław Lipert;
- 29 December 1952 – 20 December 1954: Grzegorz Wojciechowski;
- 20 December 1954 – 11.11.1956 Mieczysław Moczar;
- 11 November 1956 – 11 February 1958: Tadeusz Krupiński;
- 11 February 1958 – 22 March 1965: Antoni Mierzwiński;
- 22 March 1965 – 3 December 1971: Józef Pińkowski;
- 3 December 1971 – 12 December 1973: Zbigniew Zieliński.
