= Baraki Chotumskie =

- Village
- Location within Poland
- Coordinates: 52°53′56″N 20°29′2″E
- Country: Poland
- Voivodeship: Masovian
- County: Ciechanów
- Gmina: Ciechanów

Baraki Chotumskie [baˈraki xɔˈtumskʲɛ] is a village in the administrative district of Gmina Ciechanów, within Ciechanów County, Masovian Voivodeship, in east-central Poland. In 1975-1998 village belonged to Ciechanów Voivodeship.
