= Korytowo =

Korytowo may refer to the following places:

- Korytowo, Kuyavian-Pomeranian Voivodeship (north-central Poland)
- Korytowo, Masovian Voivodeship (east-central Poland)
- Korytowo, Choszczno County in West Pomeranian Voivodeship (north-west Poland)
- Korytowo, Goleniów County in West Pomeranian Voivodeship (north-west Poland)
