= Gołoty, Masovian Voivodeship =

Gołoty
- Village
- Location within Poland
- Coordinates: 52°50′N 20°34′E
- Country: Poland
- Voivodeship: Masovian
- County: Ciechanów
- Gmina: Ciechanów
- Population: 21

Gołoty [ɡɔˈwɔtɨ] is a village in the administrative district of Gmina Ciechanów, within Ciechanów County, Masovian Voivodeship, in east-central Poland. In 1975-1998 village belonged to Ciechanów Voivodeship.
