= Kargoszyn =

- Village
- Location within Poland
- Coordinates: 52°54′N 20°36′E
- Country: Poland
- Voivodeship: Masovian
- County: Ciechanów
- Gmina: Ciechanów

Kargoszyn [karˈɡɔʂɨn] is a village within the administrative district of Gmina Ciechanów, in Ciechanów County, Masovian Voivodeship, Poland. In 1975-1998 village belonged to Ciechanów Voivodeship.
