= Gumowo =

Gumowo may refer to the following places:

- Gumowo, Ciechanów County in Masovian Voivodeship (east-central Poland)
- Gumowo, Gmina Stary Lubotyń, Ostrów County in Masovian Voivodeship (east-central Poland)
- Gumowo, Płońsk County in Masovian Voivodeship (east-central Poland)
