= Gorysze =

- Village
- Location within Poland
- Coordinates: 52°54′N 20°32′E
- Country: Poland
- Voivodeship: Masovian
- County: Ciechanów
- Gmina: Ciechanów
- Population: 165

Gorysze [ɡɔˈrɨʂɛ] is a village in the administrative district of Gmina Ciechanów, within Ciechanów County, Masovian Voivodeship, in east-central Poland. In 1975-1998 village belonged to Ciechanów Voivodeship.
