= Kucice =

Kucice may refer to the following places:

- Kućice, Zavidovići, Bosnia and Herzegovina
- Kućice (Hadžići), Bosnia and Herzegovina
- Kučiće, Croatia
- Kucice, Poland
