= Starczewo =

Starczewo [starˈt͡ʂɛvɔ] may refer to the following places in Poland:

- Starczewo, Kuyavian-Pomeranian Voivodeship
- Starczewo, Lubusz Voivodeship
- Starczewo-Pobodze
- Starczewo Wielkie
