= Kadłubowo =

- Village
- Location within Poland
- Coordinates: 52°36′N 20°10′E
- Country: Poland
- Voivodeship: Masovian
- County: Płońsk
- Gmina: Dzierzążnia
- Population (2021): 118
- Postal code: 09-164
- Area code: +48 23
- Vehicle registration: WPN

Kadłubowo [kadwuˈbɔvɔ] is a village in the administrative district of Gmina Dzierzążnia, within Płońsk County, Masovian Voivodeship, in east-central Poland.

== History ==
In the second half of the 16th century, Kadłubowo was located in the land of Wyszogród. It was incorporated into the First Polish Republic in 1526.

In 1975–1998 the town belonged to the Ciechanów Voivodeship, becoming part of the Masovian Voivodeship after territorial reform.
