= Terespol Pomorski =

Village in Kociewie

Terespol Pomorski Terespol
- Village
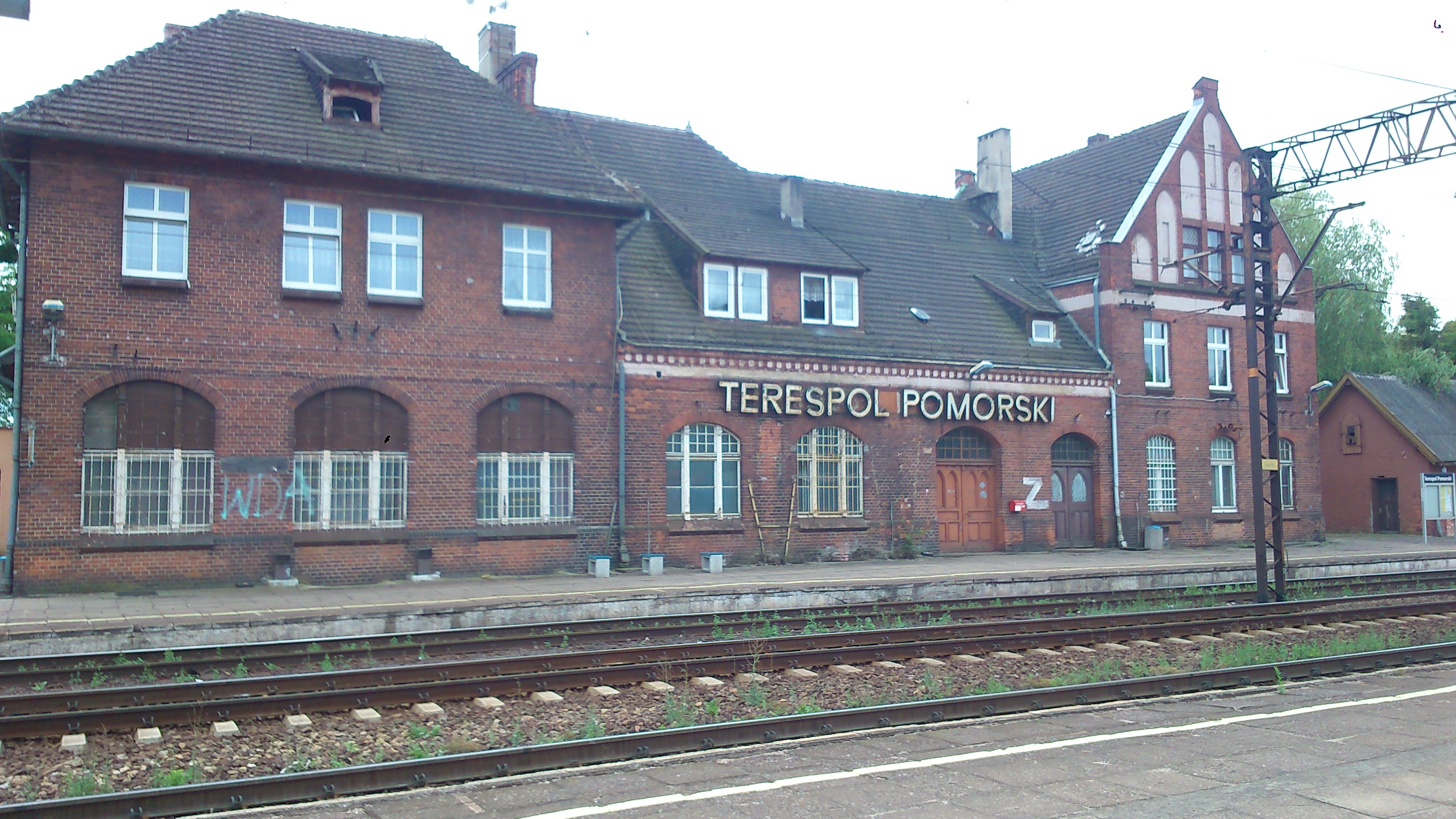
- Photograph of the village station, 2015. The external graffiti ‘WDA’ relates to local football club Wda Świecie, while the ‘Z’ denotes regional allegiance to Zawisza Bydgoszcz.

- Location within Poland
- Coordinates: 53°24′39″N 18°21′30″E
- Country: Poland
- Voivodeship: Kujawsko-Pomorskie
- County: Świecie
- Gmina: Świecie

Terespol Pomorski (Polish: [tɛˈrɛspɔl pɔˈmɔr.ski]), known in the local gmina as simply Terespol (Polish: [tɛˈrɛspɔl]), is a village in the administrative district of Gmina Świecie, within Świecie County, Kuyavian-Pomeranian Voivodeship, in north-central Poland. It is located within the ethnocultural region of Kociewie.

In the years of 1975–1998, the town belonged administratively to the Bydgoszcz Voivodeship.

In the village there are, among others: a primary school named after Tadeusz Kościuszko, the former school building (currently a residential building), the chapel of the parish of St. Wawrzyńca in Przysiersk, and a railway station with a station building from the early 20th century.

On September 29, 1987, at the railway station, due to a driver's error, there was a collision between a freight train and an express train "Bałtyk".
