= Przemkowo =

Przemkowo may refer to the following places in Poland:

- Przemkowo, Masovian Voivodeship (east-central Poland)
- Przemkowo, Pomeranian Voivodeship (north Poland)
