= Julian Arnoldt-Russocki =

Officer of the Polish Army (1893–1953)

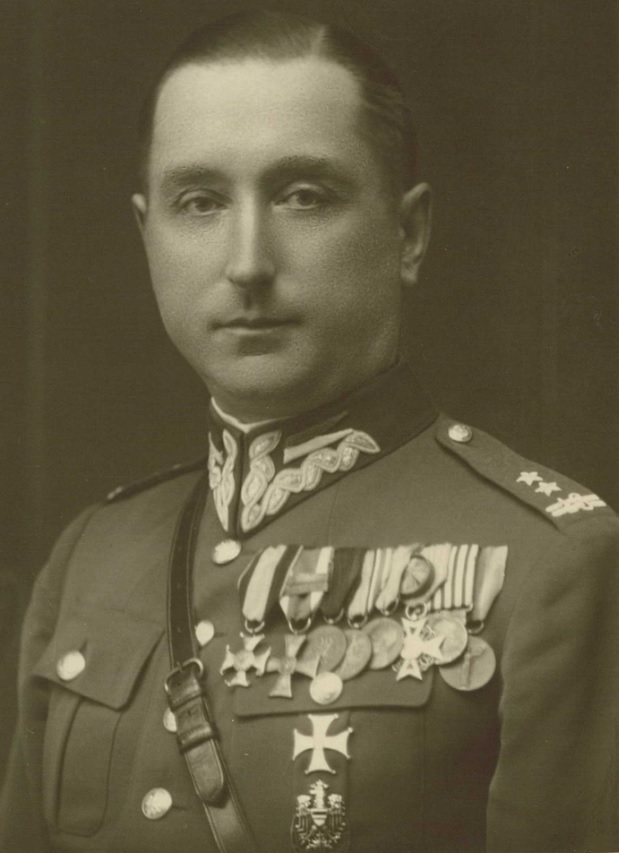
- Born: July 11, 1893; Penkiniai, Vilkaviškis, Vilna Governorate, Russian Empire
- Died: August 10, 1953 (aged 60); Location Unknown
- Burial place: Roman Catholic Cemetery, Piotrków Trybunalski, Łódź Voivodeship, Poland
- Military career
- Allegiance: Russian Empire; Second Polish Republic
- Branch: Imperial Russian Army; Polish Armed Forces
- Service years: 1914 – 1939
- Rank: Lieutenant Colonel of the Cavalry
- Commands: 16th Greater Poland Uhlan Regiment
- Conflicts: World War I; Polish–Soviet War; World War II; Battle of the Border; Battle of Bukowiec

Julian Edwin Arnoldt-Russocki was a Polish lieutenant colonel of the Polish Armed Forces who commanded the 16th Greater Poland Uhlan Regiment during the early battles of the Invasion of Poland and was the main commander at the Battle of Bukowiec before being captured two days later.

== Biography ==
He was born in 1893 in the village of Penkiny (modern Penkiniai, Lithuania). He was the son of Bronisław, the older brother of Wiktor (1895–1956), also a lieutenant colonel in the cavalry of the Polish Army.

He became an officer in the Imperial Russian Army. During, World War I, he served in the 5th Zaslaw Uhlan Regiment. After Poland regained independence, he was admitted to the Polish Armed Forces. From December 1918, he was a soldier of the 12th Podolian Uhlan Regiment, and after the transformation of the 10th Lithuanian Uhlan Regiment, he took part in the Polish-Soviet War as a cavalry lieutenant in the ranks of the 10th regiment as a reserve squadron commander. On June 1, 1921, he was still in service in the 10th Uhlans.

On May 3, 1922, he was verified as a captain with seniority on June 1, 1919 and on the 121st position in the corps of cavalry officers (from 1924 - cavalry), and his parent unit was still the 10th regiment. He was an officer of the 10th Uhlans in Białystok until 1930. On April 12, 1927, he was promoted to major with seniority on January 1, 1927 and ranked 10th in the corps of cavalry officers. In 1928 he commanded a spare squadron. In July 1929 he was transferred to the position of quartermaster. On July 5, 1930, he was transferred to the 16th Greater Poland Uhlan Regiment in Bydgoszcz as a deputy regiment commander. On January 17, 1933, he was promoted to lieutenant-colonel with seniority on January 1, 1933 and ranked 6th in the corps of cavalry officers. From July 15, 1939, he was the commander of the 16th Greater Poland, along with Gen. Gustaw Orlicz-Dreszer.

After the outbreak of World War II, he was the unit commander in the first days of the Invasion of Poland. He commanded in the Battle of Bukowiec. On the night of September 4/5, 1939, he disbanded the 16th Greater Poland. He was taken prisoner by the Germans and imprisoned in Oflag No. 506.

He died on August 10, 1953. He was buried at the Roman Catholic cemetery in Piotrków Trybunalski.

== Awards ==
- Virtuti Militari, Silver Cross No. 6716 (May 10, 1922)
- Cross of Valour (Awarded three times)
- Cross of Merit, Gold Cross (March 19, 1936)
- Cross of Independence (April 15, 1932)

=== Foreign Awards ===
- France: 1914–1918 Inter-Allied Victory medal
- Romania: Order of the Crown
