= Franciszkowo =

Franciszkowo may refer to the following places:

- Franciszkowo, Świecie County in Kuyavian-Pomeranian Voivodeship (north-central Poland)
- Franciszkowo, Lipno County in Kuyavian-Pomeranian Voivodeship (north-central Poland)
- Franciszkowo, Podlaskie Voivodeship (north-east Poland)
- Franciszkowo, Masovian Voivodeship (east-central Poland)
- Franciszkowo, Greater Poland Voivodeship (west-central Poland)
- Franciszkowo, Gostyń County in Greater Poland Voivodeship (west-central Poland)
- Franciszkowo, Giżycko County in Warmian-Masurian Voivodeship (north Poland)
- Franciszkowo, Iława County in Warmian-Masurian Voivodeship (north Poland)
