= Rutki-Borki =

- Village
- Location within Poland
- Coordinates: 52°51′48″N 20°29′25″E
- Country: Poland
- Voivodeship: Masovian
- County: Ciechanów
- Gmina: Ciechanów

Rutki-Borki [ˈrutki ˈbɔrki] is a small rural village in the administrative district of Gmina Ciechanów, within Ciechanów County, Masovian Voivodeship, in east-central Poland.
