= Rutki-Głowice =

- Village
- Location within Poland
- Coordinates: 52°51′17″N 20°30′18″E
- Country: Poland
- Voivodeship: Masovian
- County: Ciechanów
- Gmina: Ciechanów

Rutki-Głowice [ˈrutki ɡwɔˈvit͡sɛ] is a village in the administrative district of Gmina Ciechanów, within Ciechanów County, Masovian Voivodeship, in east-central Poland.
