= Pieńki Niechodzkie =

- Village
- Location within Poland
- Coordinates: 52°50′57″N 20°33′46″E
- Country: Poland
- Voivodeship: Masovian
- County: Ciechanów
- Gmina: Ciechanów
- Time zone: UTC+1 (CET)
  - Summer (DST): UTC+2 (CEST)
- Vehicle registration: WCI

Pieńki Niechodzkie [ˈpjɛɲki ɲɛˈxɔt͡skʲɛ] is a village in the administrative district of Gmina Ciechanów, within Ciechanów County, Masovian Voivodeship, in north-central Poland.

Three Polish citizens were murdered by Nazi Germany in the village during World War II.
