= Gmina Dzierzążnia =

Gmina Dzierzążnia Dzierzążnia Commune
- Gmina
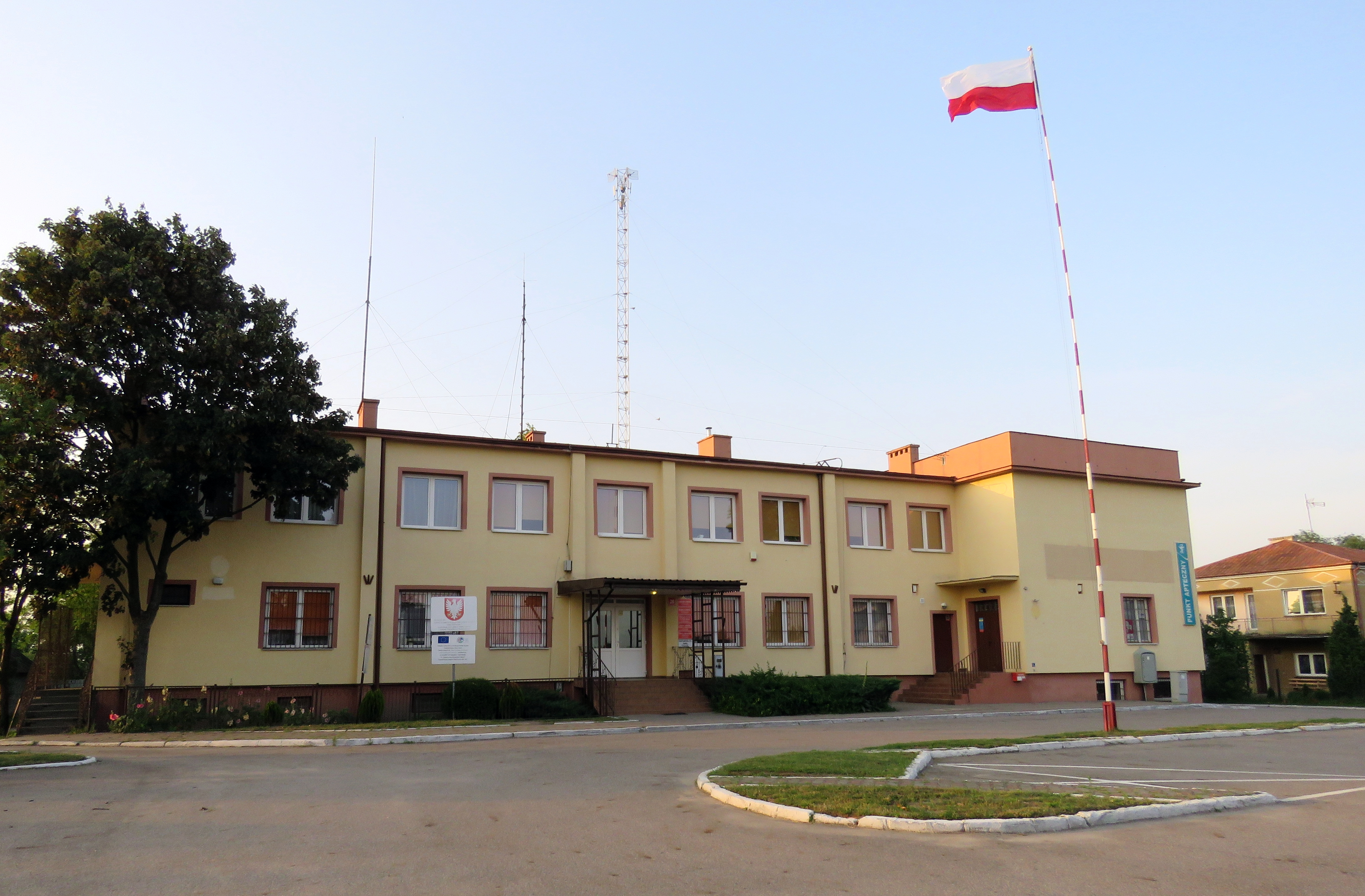
- Municipal office
- Interactive map of Gmina Dzierzążnia
- Coordinates (Dzierzążnia): 52°38′N 20°14′E
- Country: Poland
- Voivodeship: Masovian
- County: Płońsk
- Seat: Dzierzążnia

Area
  - Total: 102.1 km^{2} (39.4 sq mi)

Population (2013)
  - Total: 3,809
  - Density: 37.31/km^{2} (96.62/sq mi)
- Website: dzierzaznia.pl

Gmina Dzierzążnia is a rural gmina (administrative district) in Płońsk County, Masovian Voivodeship, in east-central Poland. Its seat is the village of Dzierzążnia, which lies approximately 11 kilometres (7 mi) west of Płońsk and 70 km (43 mi) north-west of Warsaw.

The gmina covers an area of 102.1 square kilometres (39.4 sq mi), and as of 2006 its total population is 3,896 (3,809 in 2013).

== Villages ==
Gmina Dzierzążnia contains the villages and settlements of:

- Błomino Gumowskie
- Błomino-Gule
- Błomino-Jeże
- Chrościn
- Cumino
- Dzierzążnia
- Gumowo
- Kadłubowo
- Korytowo
- Kucice
- Niwa
- Nowa Dzierzążnia
- Nowe Gumino
- Nowe Kucice
- Nowe Sarnowo
- Pluskocin
- Podmarszczyn
- Pomianowo
- Przemkowo
- Rakowo
- Sadkowo
- Sarnowo-Góry
- Siekluki
- Skołatowo
- Starczewo Wielkie
- Starczewo-Pobodze
- Stare Gumino
- Wierzbica Pańska
- Wierzbica Szlachecka
- Wilamowice

== Neighbouring gminas ==
Gmina Dzierzążnia is bordered by the gminas of Baboszewo, Bulkowo, Naruszewo, Płońsk and Staroźreby.
