= Nowa Dzierzążnia =

- Village
- Location within Poland
- Coordinates: 52°36′56″N 20°12′55″E
- Country: Poland
- Voivodeship: Masovian
- County: Płońsk
- Gmina: Dzierzążnia

Nowa Dzierzążnia [ˈnɔva d͡ʑɛˈʐɔ̃ʐɲa] is a village in the administrative district of Gmina Dzierzążnia, within Płońsk County, Masovian Voivodeship, in east-central Poland.
