= Rzeczki, Masovian Voivodeship =

Rzeczki
- Village
- Location within Poland
- Coordinates: 52°50′31″N 20°41′32″E
- Country: Poland
- Voivodeship: Masovian
- County: Ciechanów
- Gmina: Ciechanów
- Population (approx.): 150

Rzeczki [ˈʐɛt͡ʂki] is a village in the administrative district of Gmina Ciechanów, within Ciechanów County, Masovian Voivodeship, in east-central Poland.
