= Ujazdówek, Masovian Voivodeship =

Ujazdówek
- Village
- Location within Poland
- Coordinates: 52°51′26″N 20°32′05″E
- Country: Poland
- Voivodeship: Masovian
- County: Ciechanów
- Gmina: Ciechanów
- Time zone: UTC+1 (CET)
  - Summer (DST): UTC+2 (CEST)
- Postal code: 06-400
- Vehicle registration: WCI

Ujazdówek [ujazˈduvɛk] is a village in the administrative district of Gmina Ciechanów, within Ciechanów County, Masovian Voivodeship, in north-central Poland.

== History ==
During the German occupation in World War II, the occupiers operated a forced labour camp for Poles and Jews in the village from 1941 to 1944.
