= Różanna, Świecie County =

Village in Kociewie

Różanna
- Village
- Location within Poland
- Coordinates: 53°23′N 18°16′E
- Country: Poland
- Voivodeship: Kuyavian-Pomeranian
- County: Świecie
- Gmina: Bukowiec

Różanna [ruˈʐanna] is a village in the administrative district of Gmina Bukowiec, within Świecie County, Kuyavian-Pomeranian Voivodeship, in north-central Poland.
