= Pęchcin =

- Village
- Location within Poland
- Coordinates: 52°52′N 20°34′E
- Country: Poland
- Voivodeship: Masovian
- County: Ciechanów
- Gmina: Ciechanów

Pęchcin [ˈpɛ̃xt͡ɕin] is a village in the administrative district of Gmina Ciechanów, within Ciechanów County, Masovian Voivodeship, in east-central Poland.
