= Pluskocin, Masovian Voivodeship =

Pluskocin
- Village
- Location within Poland
- Coordinates: 52°36′28″N 20°11′41″E
- Country: Poland
- Voivodeship: Masovian
- County: Płońsk
- Gmina: Dzierzążnia

Pluskocin [plusˈkɔt͡ɕin] is a village in the administrative district of Gmina Dzierzążnia, within Płońsk County, Masovian Voivodeship, in east-central Poland.
