= Ujazdowo, Masovian Voivodeship =

Ujazdowo
- Village
- Location within Poland
- Coordinates: 52°50′18″N 20°32′22″E
- Country: Poland
- Voivodeship: Masovian
- County: Ciechanów
- Gmina: Ciechanów

Ujazdowo [ujazˈdɔvɔ] is a village in the administrative district of Gmina Ciechanów, within Ciechanów County, Masovian Voivodeship, in east-central Poland.
