= Gmina Ciechanów =

Gmina Ciechanów Ciechanów Commune
- Gmina
- Coat of arms
- Interactive map of Gmina Ciechanów
- Coordinates (Ciechanów): 52°52′N 20°38′E
- Country: Poland
- Voivodeship: Masovian
- County: Ciechanów
- Seat: Ciechanów

Area
  - Total: 140.23 km^{2} (54.14 sq mi)

Population (2013)
  - Total: 6,885
  - Density: 49.10/km^{2} (127.2/sq mi)
- Website: http://www.gminaciechanow.pl

Gmina Ciechanów is a rural gmina (administrative district) in Ciechanów County, Masovian Voivodeship, in east-central Poland. Its seat is the town of Ciechanów, although the town is not part of the territory of the gmina.

The gmina covers an area of 140.23 square kilometres (54.1 sq mi), and as of 2006 its total population is 5,938 (6,885 in 2013).

== Villages ==
Gmina Ciechanów contains the villages and settlements of Baby, Baraki Chotumskie, Bardonki, Chotum, Chruszczewo, Gąski, Gołoty, Gorysze, Grędzice, Gumowo, Kanigówek, Kargoszyn, Kownaty Żędowe, Mieszki Wielkie, Mieszki-Atle, Mieszki-Bardony, Mieszki-Różki, Modełka, Modła, Niechodzin, Niestum, Nowa Wieś, Nużewko, Nużewo, Pęchcin, Pieńki Niechodzkie, Przążewo, Romanowo, Ropele, Rutki-Begny, Rutki-Borki, Rutki-Bronisze, Rutki-Głowice, Rutki-Krupy, Rutki-Marszewice, Rutki-Szczepanki, Rydzewo, Rykaczewo, Rzeczki, Ujazdówek, Ujazdowo, Wola Pawłowska and Wólka Rydzewska.

== Neighbouring gminas ==
Gmina Ciechanów is bordered by the town of Ciechanów and by the gminas of Glinojeck, Gołymin-Ośrodek, Ojrzeń, Opinogóra Górna, Regimin, Sońsk and Strzegowo.
