= Mieszki-Atle =

- Village
- Location within Poland
- Coordinates: 52°50′08″N 20°38′48″E
- Country: Poland
- Voivodeship: (Masovian Voivodeship) Masovian
- County: Ciechanów
- Gmina: Ciechanów

Mieszki-Atle [ˈmjɛʂki ˈatlɛ] is a village in the administrative district of Gmina Ciechanów, within Ciechanów County, Masovian Voivodeship, in east-central Poland.
