= Wierzbica Pańska =

- Village
- Location within Poland
- Coordinates: 52°37′19″N 20°10′56″E
- Country: Poland
- Voivodeship: Masovian
- County: Płońsk
- Gmina: Dzierzążnia
- Population: 130

Wierzbica Pańska (Polish pronunciation: [vjɛʐˈbitsa ˈpaj̃ska]) is a village in the administrative district of Gmina Dzierzążnia, within Płońsk County, Masovian Voivodeship, in east-central Poland.
