= Rutki-Bronisze =

- Village
- Location within Poland
- Coordinates: 52°52′24″N 20°29′38″E
- Country: Poland
- Voivodeship: Masovian
- County: Ciechanów
- Gmina: Ciechanów

Rutki-Bronisze [ˈrutki brɔˈniʂɛ] is a village in the administrative district of Gmina Ciechanów, within Ciechanów County, Masovian Voivodeship, in east-central Poland.
