= Bardonki =

- Village
- Location within Poland
- Coordinates: 52°48′56″N 20°39′14″E
- Country: Poland
- Voivodeship: Masovian
- County: Ciechanów
- Gmina: Ciechanów

Bardonki [barˈdɔnki] is a village in the administrative district of Gmina Ciechanów, within Ciechanów County, Masovian Voivodeship, in east-central Poland.
