= Rutki-Krupy =

- Village
- Location within Poland
- Coordinates: 52°51′24″N 20°30′27″E
- Country: Poland
- Voivodeship: Masovian
- County: Ciechanów
- Gmina: Ciechanów

Rutki-Krupy [ˈrutki ˈkrupɨ] is a village in the administrative district of Gmina Ciechanów, within Ciechanów County, Masovian Voivodeship, in east-central Poland.
