= Nużewo =

- Village
- Location within Poland
- Coordinates: 52°50′N 20°36′E
- Country: Poland
- Voivodeship: Masovian
- County: Ciechanów
- Gmina: Ciechanów

Nużewo [nuˈʐɛvɔ] is a village in the administrative district of Gmina Ciechanów, within Ciechanów County, Masovian Voivodeship, in east-central Poland.

It is the birthplace of Polish weightlifter and Olympic champion Ireneusz Paliński (1932–2006).
