= Stare Gumino =

- Village
- Location within Poland
- Coordinates: 52°34′17″N 20°15′28″E
- Country: Poland
- Voivodeship: Masovian
- County: Płońsk
- Gmina: Dzierzążnia

Stare Gumino [ˈstarɛ ɡuˈminɔ] is a village in the administrative district of Gmina Dzierzążnia, within Płońsk County, Masovian Voivodeship, in east-central Poland.
