= Niwa, Masovian Voivodeship =

Niwa
- Village
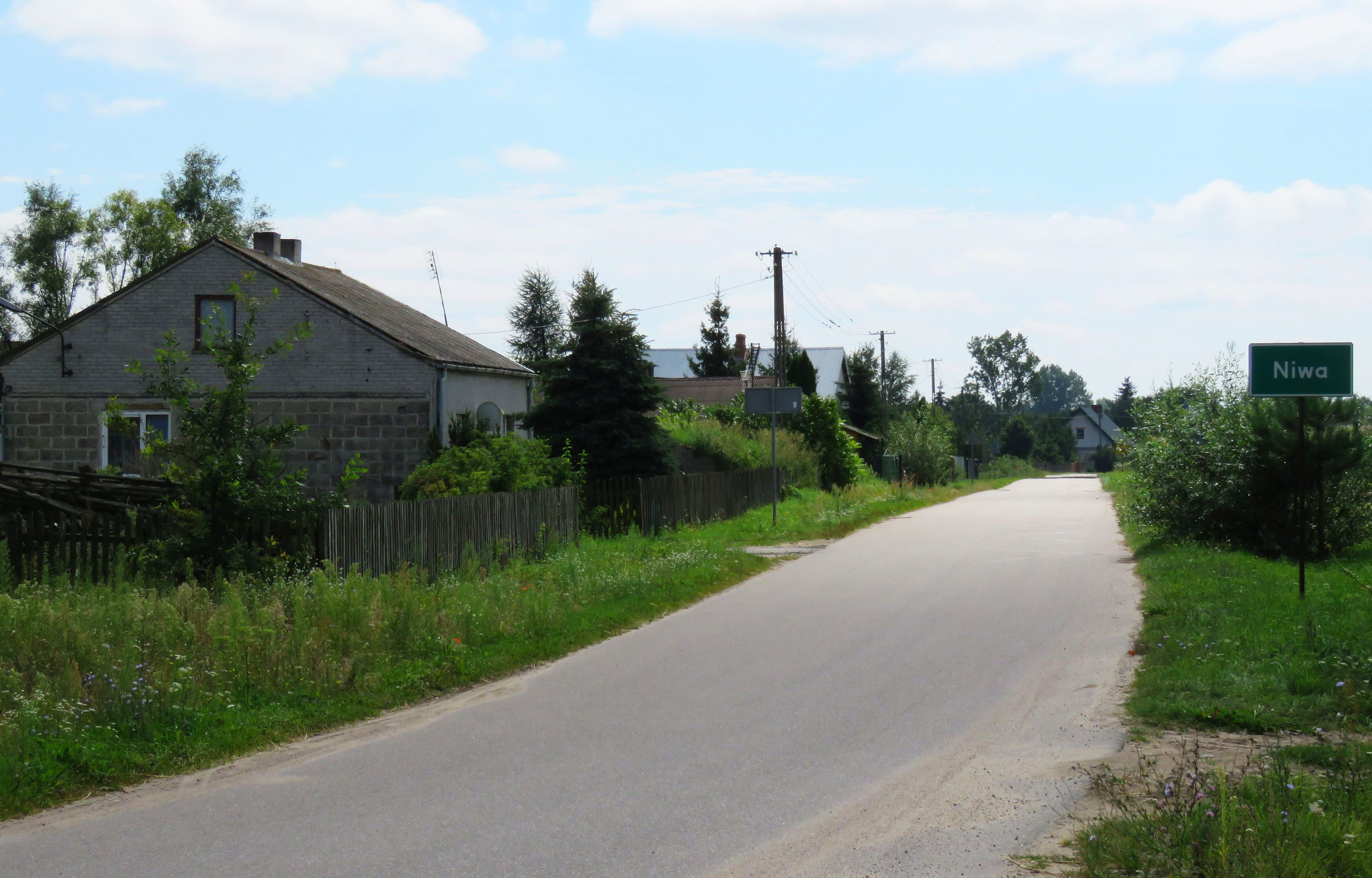
- Roadside house in Niwa

- Location within Poland
- Coordinates: 52°35′30″N 20°17′23″E
- Country: Poland
- Voivodeship: Masovian
- County: Płońsk
- Gmina: Dzierzążnia

Niwa [ˈɲiva] is a village in the administrative district of Gmina Dzierzążnia, within Płońsk County, Masovian Voivodeship, in east-central Poland.
