= Wilamowice, Masovian Voivodeship =

Wilamowice
- Village
- Location within Poland
- Coordinates: 52°36′N 20°17′E
- Country: Poland
- Voivodeship: Masovian
- County: Płońsk
- Gmina: Dzierzążnia

Wilamowice [vilamɔˈvit͡sɛ] is a village in the administrative district of Gmina Dzierzążnia, within Płońsk County, Masovian Voivodeship, in east-central Poland.
