= Błomino-Gule =

- Village
- Location within Poland
- Coordinates: 52°39′13″N 20°11′39″E
- Country: Poland
- Voivodeship: Masovian
- County: Płońsk
- Gmina: Dzierzążnia

Błomino-Gule [bwɔˈminɔ ˈɡulɛ] is a village in the administrative district of Gmina Dzierzążnia, within Płońsk County, Masovian Voivodeship, in east-central Poland.
