= Cumino =

- Village
- Location within Poland
- Coordinates: 52°32′35″N 20°13′30″E
- Country: Poland
- Voivodeship: Masovian
- County: Płońsk
- Gmina: Dzierzążnia

Cumino [t͡suˈminɔ] is a village in the administrative district of Gmina Dzierzążnia, within Płońsk County, Masovian Voivodeship, in east-central Poland.
