= Jarzębieniec =

Village in Kociewie

- Village
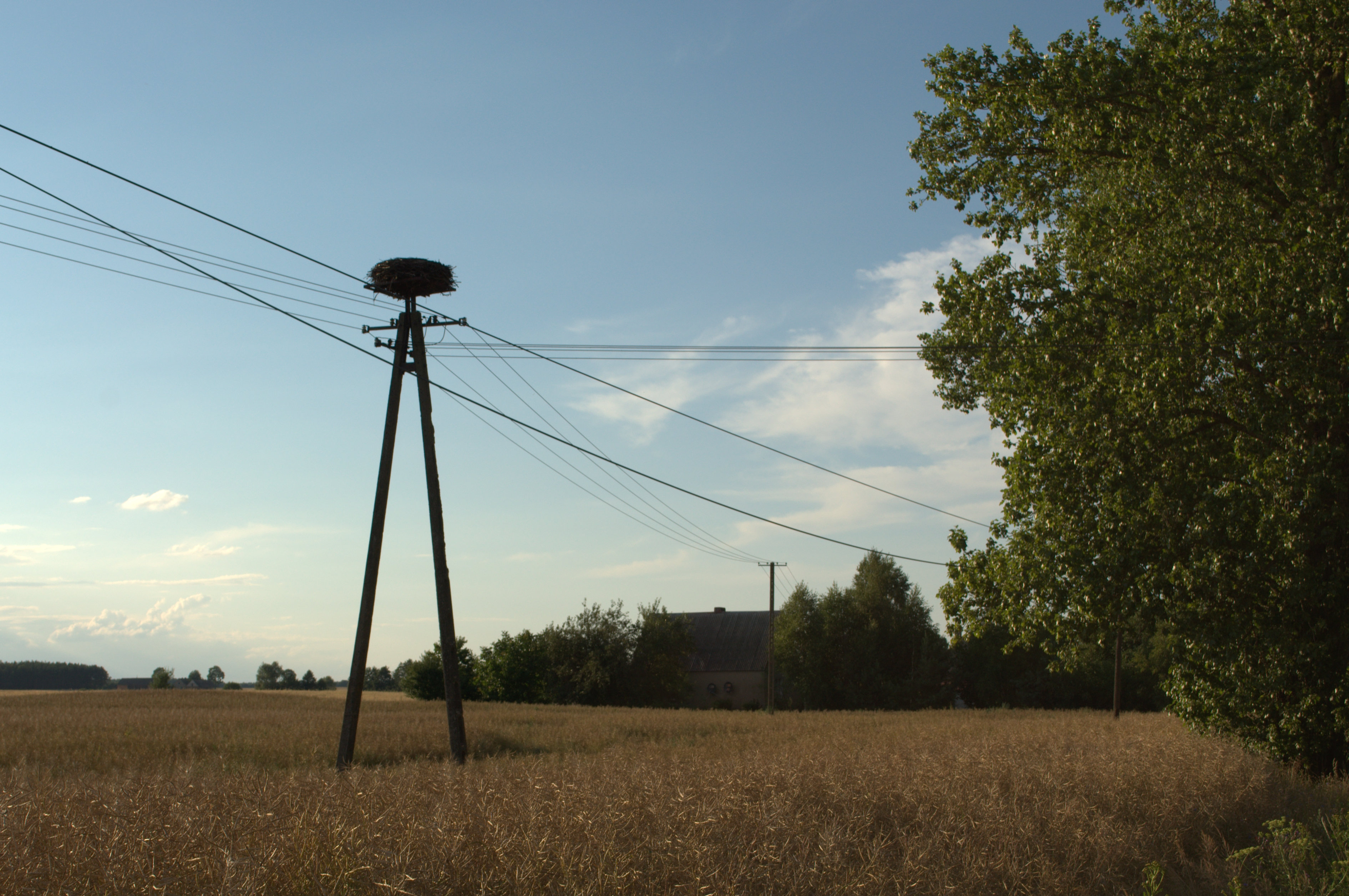
- A white stork's nest atop an electricity pylon in the village

- Location within Poland
- Coordinates: 53°27′34″N 18°17′56″E
- Country: Poland
- Voivodeship: Kuyavian-Pomeranian
- County: Świecie
- Gmina: Bukowiec
- Population: 70

Jarzębieniec [jaʐɛmˈbjɛɲɛt͡s] is a village in the administrative district of Gmina Bukowiec, within Świecie County, Kuyavian-Pomeranian Voivodeship, in north-central Poland.
