= Wierzbica Szlachecka =

- Village
- Location within Poland
- Coordinates: 52°38′23″N 20°10′13″E
- Country: Poland
- Voivodeship: Masovian
- County: Płońsk
- Gmina: Dzierzążnia

Wierzbica Szlachecka [vjɛʐˈbit͡sa ʂlaˈxɛt͡ska] is a village in the administrative district of Gmina Dzierzążnia, within Płońsk County, Masovian Voivodeship, in east-central Poland.
