= Niestum =

- Village
- Location within Poland
- Coordinates: 52°55′12″N 20°37′22″E
- Country: Poland
- Voivodeship: Masovian
- County: Ciechanów
- Gmina: Ciechanów

Niestum [ˈɲɛstum] is a village in the administrative district of Gmina Ciechanów, within Ciechanów County, Masovian Voivodeship, in east-central Poland.
