= Sarnowo-Góry =

- Village
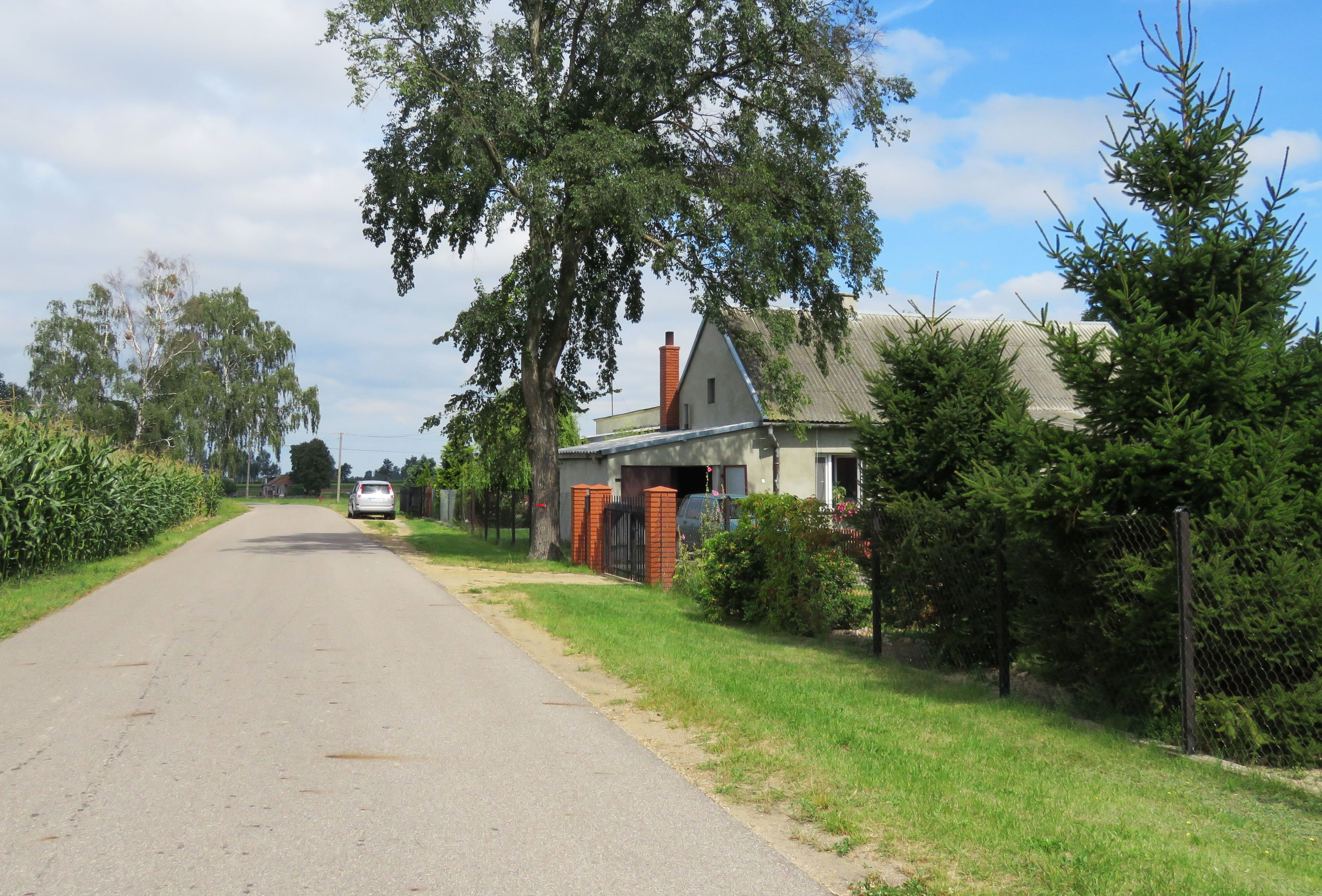

- Location within Poland
- Coordinates: 52°36′10″N 20°15′35″E
- Country: Poland
- Voivodeship: Masovian
- County: Płońsk
- Gmina: Dzierzążnia

Sarnowo-Góry [sarˈnɔvɔ ˈɡurɨ] is a village in the administrative district of Gmina Dzierzążnia, within Płońsk County, Masovian Voivodeship, in east-central Poland.
