= Rutki-Marszewice =

- Village
- Location within Poland
- Coordinates: 52°52′06″N 20°31′51″E
- Country: Poland
- Voivodeship: Masovian
- County: Ciechanów
- Gmina: Ciechanów

Rutki-Marszewice [ˈrutki marʂɛˈvit͡sɛ] is a village in the administrative district of Gmina Ciechanów, within Ciechanów County, Masovian Voivodeship, in east-central Poland.
