= Modła, Ciechanów County =

Modła
- Village
- Location within Poland
- Coordinates: 52°53′42″N 20°26′38″E
- Country: Poland
- Voivodeship: Masovian
- County: Ciechanów
- Gmina: Ciechanów

Modła [ˈmɔdwa] is a village in the administrative district of Gmina Ciechanów, within Ciechanów County, Masovian Voivodeship, in east-central Poland.
