= Rakowo, Płońsk County =

Rakowo
- Village
- Location within Poland
- Coordinates: 52°38′N 20°17′E
- Country: Poland
- Voivodeship: Masovian
- County: Płońsk
- Gmina: Dzierzążnia
- Population: 50

Rakowo [raˈkɔvɔ] is a village in the administrative district of Gmina Dzierzążnia, within Płońsk County, Masovian Voivodeship, in east-central Poland.
