= Kownaty Żędowe =

- Village
- Location within Poland
- Coordinates: 52°50′17″N 20°33′55″E
- Country: Poland
- Voivodeship: Masovian
- County: Ciechanów
- Gmina: Ciechanów
- Website: www.ksgryf.prv.pl

Kownaty Żędowe [kɔvˈnatɨ ʐɛnˈdɔvɛ] is a village in the administrative district of Gmina Ciechanów, within Ciechanów County, Masovian Voivodeship, in east-central Poland.
