= Rydzewo, Ciechanów County =

Rydzewo
- Village
- Location within Poland
- Coordinates: 52°52′22″N 20°26′14″E
- Country: Poland
- Voivodeship: Masovian
- County: Ciechanów
- Gmina: Ciechanów
- Population: 370

Rydzewo [rɨˈd͡zɛvɔ] is a village in the administrative district of Gmina Ciechanów, within Ciechanów County, Masovian Voivodeship, in east-central Poland.
