= Kawęcin =

Village in Kociewie

- Village
- Location within Poland
- Coordinates: 53°28′24″N 18°15′2″E
- Country: Poland
- Voivodeship: Kuyavian-Pomeranian
- County: Świecie
- Gmina: Bukowiec
- Population: 130

Kawęcin [kaˈvɛnt͡ɕin] is a village in the administrative district of Gmina Bukowiec, within Świecie County, Kuyavian-Pomeranian Voivodeship, in north-central Poland.
