= Gawroniec, Kuyavian-Pomeranian Voivodeship =

Village in Kociewie

Gawroniec
- Village
- Location within Poland
- Coordinates: 53°24′N 18°16′E
- Country: Poland
- Voivodeship: Kuyavian-Pomeranian
- County: Świecie
- Gmina: Bukowiec
- Population: 530

Gawroniec [ɡaˈvrɔɲɛt͡s] is a village in the administrative district of Gmina Bukowiec, within Świecie County, Kuyavian-Pomeranian Voivodeship, in north-central Poland.
