= Chrościn =

Village in Gmina Dzierzążnia, Poland

- Village
- Location within Poland
- Coordinates: 52°33′07″N 20°12′30″E
- Country: Poland
- Voivodeship: Masovian
- County: Płońsk
- Gmina: Dzierzążnia

Chrościn [ˈxrɔɕt͡ɕin] is a village in the administrative district of Gmina Dzierzążnia, within Płońsk County, Masovian Voivodeship, in east-central Poland.
