= Krupocin =

Village in Kociewie

- Village
- Location within Poland
- Coordinates: 53°27′N 18°12′E
- Country: Poland
- Voivodeship: Kuyavian-Pomeranian
- County: Świecie
- Gmina: Bukowiec

Krupocin [kruˈpɔt͡ɕin] is a village located in the administrative district of Gmina Bukowiec, within Świecie County, in the Kuyavian-Pomeranian Voivodeship of north-central Poland.
