= Nowa Wieś, Gmina Ciechanów =

Nowa Wieś
- Village
- Location within Poland
- Coordinates: 52°52′31″N 20°28′26″E
- Country: Poland
- Voivodeship: Masovian
- County: Ciechanów
- Gmina: Ciechanów

Nowa Wieś [ˈnɔva ˈvjɛɕ] is a village in the administrative district of Gmina Ciechanów, within Ciechanów County, Masovian Voivodeship, in east-central Poland.
