= Gmina Bukowiec =

Gmina Bukowiec Bukowiec Commune
- Gmina
- Flag Coat of arms
- Interactive map of Gmina Bukowiec
- Coordinates (Bukowiec): 53°25′54″N 18°14′20″E
- Country: Poland
- Voivodeship: Kuyavian-Pomeranian
- County: Świecie
- Seat: Bukowiec

Area
  - Total: 111 km^{2} (43 sq mi)

Population (2006)
  - Total: 5,122
  - Density: 46.1/km^{2} (120/sq mi)
- Website: http://www.bukowiec.pl/

Gmina Bukowiec is a rural gmina (administrative district) in Świecie County, Kuyavian-Pomeranian Voivodeship, in north-central Poland. Its seat is the village of Bukowiec, which lies approximately 14 kilometres (9 mi) west of Świecie and 39 km (24 mi) north-east of Bydgoszcz.

The gmina covers an area of 111 square kilometres (42.9 sq mi), and as of 2006 its total population is 5,122.

== Villages ==
Gmina Bukowiec contains the villages and settlements of Bramka, Branica, Budyń, Bukowiec, Franciszkowo, Gawroniec, Jarzębieniec, Kawęcin, Korytowo, Krupocin, Plewno, Poledno, Polskie Łąki, Przysiersk, Różanna and Tuszynki.

== Neighbouring gminas ==
Gmina Bukowiec is bordered by the gminas of Drzycim, Lniano, Pruszcz, Świecie and Świekatowo.
