= Dzierzążnia =

- Village
- Location within Poland
- Coordinates: 52°38′N 20°14′E
- Country: Poland
- Voivodeship: Masovian
- County: Płońsk
- Gmina: Dzierzążnia

Dzierzążnia ([d͡ʑɛˈʐɔ̃ʐɲa]; German: Güntersruhm) is a village in Płońsk County, Masovian Voivodeship, in east-central Poland. It is the seat of the gmina (administrative district) called Gmina Dzierzążnia.
