= Wólka Rydzewska =

- Village
- Location within Poland
- Coordinates: 52°52′33″N 20°24′33″E
- Country: Poland
- Voivodeship: Masovian
- County: Ciechanów
- Gmina: Ciechanów

Wólka Rydzewska [ˈvulka rɨˈd͡zɛfska] is a village in the administrative district of Gmina Ciechanów, within Ciechanów County, Masovian Voivodeship, in east-central Poland.
