= Rutki-Begny =

- Village
- Location within Poland
- Coordinates: 52°52′35″N 20°30′40″E
- Country: Poland
- Voivodeship: Masovian
- County: Ciechanów
- Gmina: Ciechanów

Rutki-Begny [ˈrutki ˈbɛɡnɨ] is a village in the administrative district of Gmina Ciechanów, within Ciechanów County, Masovian Voivodeship, in east-central Poland.
