= Mieszki-Bardony =

- Village
- Location within Poland
- Coordinates: 52°48′53″N 20°39′16″E
- Country: Poland
- Voivodeship: Masovian
- County: Ciechanów
- Gmina: Ciechanów

Mieszki-Bardony [ˈmjɛʂki barˈdɔnɨ] is a village in the administrative district of Gmina Ciechanów, within Ciechanów County, Masovian Voivodeship, in east-central Poland.
