= Błomino Gumowskie =

Village in Gmina Dzierzażnia, Poland

- Village
- Location within Poland
- Coordinates: 52°39′8″N 20°12′19″E
- Country: Poland
- Voivodeship: Masovian
- County: Płońsk
- Gmina: Dzierzążnia

Błomino Gumowskie [bwɔˈminɔ ɡuˈmɔfskʲɛ] is a village in the administrative district of Gmina Dzierzążnia, within Płońsk County, Masovian Voivodeship, in east-central Poland.
