= Sadkowo, Masovian Voivodeship =

Sadkowo
- Village
- Location within Poland
- Coordinates: 53°53′31″N 16°11′56″E
- Country: Poland
- Voivodeship: Masovian
- County: Płońsk
- Gmina: Dzierzążnia

Sadkowo [satˈkɔvɔ] is a village in the administrative district of Gmina Dzierzążnia, within Płońsk County, Masovian Voivodeship, in east-central Poland.
