= Nowe Kucice =

- Village
- Location within Poland
- Coordinates: 52°35′50″N 20°12′42″E
- Country: Poland
- Voivodeship: Masovian
- County: Płońsk
- Gmina: Dzierzążnia

Nowe Kucice [ˈnɔvɛ kuˈt͡ɕit͡sɛ] is a village in the administrative district of Gmina Dzierzążnia, within Płońsk County, Masovian Voivodeship, in east-central Poland.
