= Tuszynki =

Village in Kociewie

- Village
- Location within Poland
- Coordinates: 53°25′N 18°11′E
- Country: Poland
- Voivodeship: Kuyavian-Pomeranian
- County: Świecie
- Gmina: Bukowiec
- Population: 102

Tuszynki [tuˈʂɨŋki] is a village in the administrative district of Gmina Bukowiec, within Świecie County, Kuyavian-Pomeranian Voivodeship, in north-central Poland.
