= Pomianowo, Masovian Voivodeship =

Pomianowo
- Village
- Location within Poland
- Coordinates: 52°36′41″N 20°10′19″E
- Country: Poland
- Voivodeship: Masovian
- County: Płońsk
- Gmina: Dzierzążnia

Pomianowo [pɔmjaˈnɔvɔ] is a village in the administrative district of Gmina Dzierzążnia, within Płońsk County, Masovian Voivodeship, in east-central Poland.
