= Nowe Sarnowo =

- Village
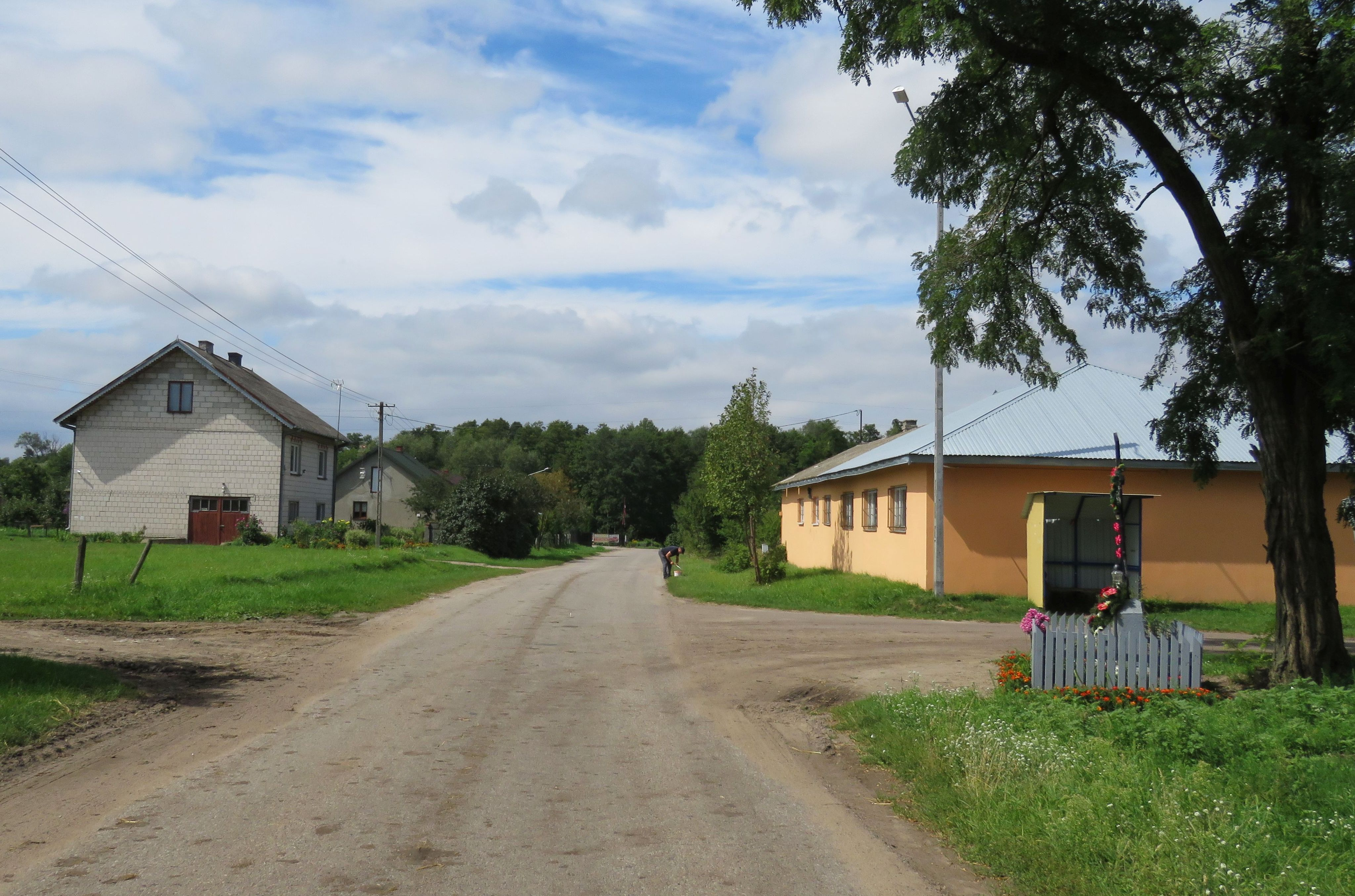

- Location within Poland
- Coordinates: 52°36′19″N 20°14′28″E
- Country: Poland
- Voivodeship: Masovian
- County: Płońsk
- Gmina: Dzierzążnia

Nowe Sarnowo [ˈnɔvɛ sarˈnɔvɔ] is a village in the administrative district of Gmina Dzierzążnia, within Płońsk County, Masovian Voivodeship, in east-central Poland. Despite being founded for a significant period of time, its population has remained low.
