= Romanowo, Ciechanów County =

Romanowo
- Village
- Location within Poland
- Coordinates: 52°52′30″N 21°01′48″E
- Country: Poland
- Voivodeship: Masovian
- County: Ciechanów
- Gmina: Ciechanów

Romanowo [rɔmaˈnɔvɔ] is a village in the administrative district of Gmina Ciechanów, within Ciechanów County, Masovian Voivodeship, in east-central Poland.
