= Mieszki-Różki =

Village in Gmina Ciechanów, Poland

- Village
- Location within Poland
- Coordinates: 52°49′32″N 20°38′55″E
- Country: Poland
- Voivodeship: Masovian
- County: Ciechanów
- Gmina: Ciechanów

Mieszki-Różki [ˈmjɛʂki ˈruʂki] is a village in the administrative district of Gmina Ciechanów, within Ciechanów County, Masovian Voivodeship, in east-central Poland.
