= Wola Pawłowska, Ciechanów County =

Wola Pawłowska
- Village
- Location within Poland
- Coordinates: 52°54′N 20°31′E
- Country: Poland
- Voivodeship: Masovian
- County: Ciechanów
- Gmina: Ciechanów

Wola Pawłowska [ˈvɔla paˈvwɔfska] is a village in the administrative district of Gmina Ciechanów, within Ciechanów County, Masovian Voivodeship, in east-central Poland.
