= Kucice, Poland =

Kucice
- Village
- Location within Poland
- Coordinates: 52°34′N 20°14′E
- Country: Poland
- Voivodeship: Masovian
- County: Płońsk
- Gmina: Dzierzążnia

Kucice [kuˈt͡ɕit͡sɛ] is a village in the administrative district of Gmina Dzierzążnia, within Płońsk County, Masovian Voivodeship, in east-central Poland.
