= Starczewo Wielkie =

- Village
- Location within Poland
- Coordinates: 52°39′32″N 20°9′58″E
- Country: Poland
- Voivodeship: Masovian
- County: Płońsk
- Gmina: Dzierzążnia

Starczewo Wielkie [starˈt͡ʂɛvɔ ˈvjɛlkʲɛ] is a village in the administrative district of Gmina Dzierzążnia, within Płońsk County, Masovian Voivodeship, in east-central Poland.
