= Franciszkowo, Świecie County =

Village in Kociewie

Franciszkowo
- Village
- Location within Poland
- Coordinates: 53°28′N 18°13′E
- Country: Poland
- Voivodeship: Kuyavian-Pomeranian
- County: Świecie
- Gmina: Bukowiec

Franciszkowo [frant͡ɕiʂˈkɔvɔ] is a village in the administrative district of Gmina Bukowiec, within Świecie County, Kuyavian-Pomeranian Voivodeship, in north-central Poland.
