= Gumowo, Płońsk County =

Gumowo
- Village
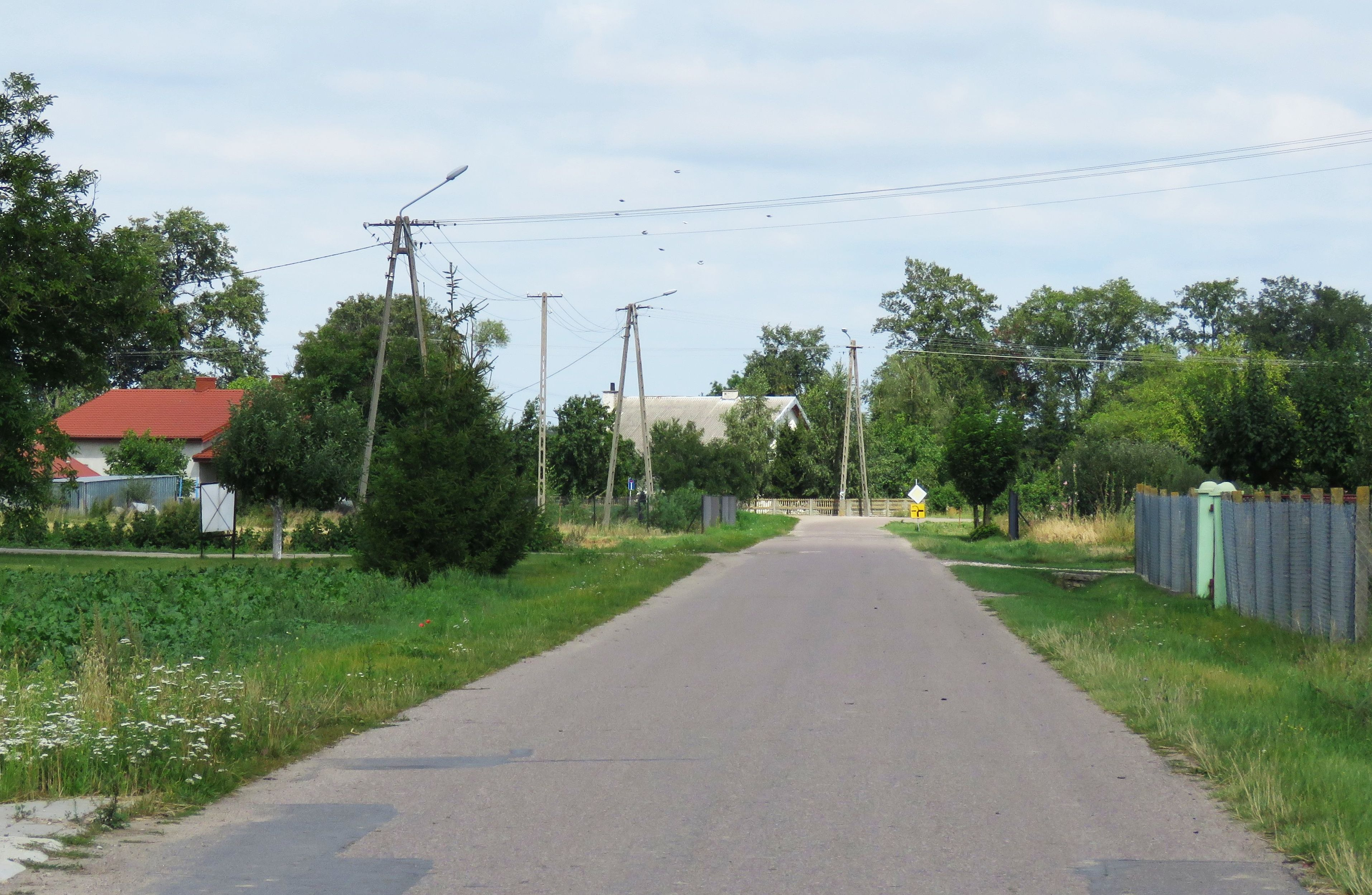

- Location within Poland
- Coordinates: 52°37′29″N 20°15′07″E
- Country: Poland
- Voivodeship: Masovian
- County: Płońsk
- Gmina: Dzierzążnia

Gumowo [ɡuˈmɔvɔ] is a village in the administrative district of Gmina Dzierzążnia, within Płońsk County, Masovian Voivodeship, in east-central Poland.
