= Przemkowo, Masovian Voivodeship =

Przemkowo
- Village
- Location within Poland
- Coordinates: 52°35′5″N 20°17′23″E
- Country: Poland
- Voivodeship: Masovian
- County: Płońsk
- Gmina: Dzierzążnia

Przemkowo [pʂɛmˈkɔvɔ] is a village in the administrative district of Gmina Dzierzążnia, within Płońsk County, Masovian Voivodeship, in east-central Poland.
