= Biała Podlaska Voivodeship =

Former voivodeship of Poland (1975–1998)

Coordinates: 52°02′13″N 23°07′27″E

- Voivodeship of the Polish People's Republic and Third Republic of Poland
- 1975–1998
- Coat of arms

- Biała Podlaska Voivodeship within Poland between 1975 and 1998.
- Capital: Biała Podlaska
- Area
  - 1997: 5,348 km^{2} (2,065 sq mi)
- Population
  - 1975: 280 400
  - 1997: 309 000
- Government
  - Type: Voivodeship
- Voivode
  - 1975–1986 (first): Józef Piela
  - 1997–1998 (last): Marek Czarnecki
- History
  - Established: 1 June 1975
  - Disestablished: 31 December 1998
- Contained within
  - Country: Polish People's Republic (1975–1989); Third Republic of Poland (1989–1998)
- Political subdivisions: 40 gminas (1997)
Preceded by	Succeeded by
Lublin Voivodeship; Warsaw Voivodeship	Lublin Voivodeship; Masovian Voivodeship

The Biała Podlaska Voivodeship (Note: Polish: Województwo bialskopodlaskie) was a voivodeship (province) of the Polish People's Republic from 1975 to 1989, and the Third Republic of Poland from 1989 to 1998. Its capital was Biała Podlaska. It was established on 1 June 1975, from the parts of the voivodeships of Lublin, and Warsaw Voivodeship, and existed until 31 December 1998, when it was partitioned between then-established Lublin, and Masovian Voivodeships.

== History ==
The Biała Voivodeship was established on 1 June 1975, as part of the administrative reform, and was one of the voivodeships (provinces) of the Polish People's Republic. It was formed mostly from the part of the territory of the Lublin Voivodeship, additionally including part of the territory of the Łosice County, of the Warsaw Voivodeship. Its capital was located in the city of Biała Podlaska. In 1975, it had a population of 280 400 people.

On 9 December 1989, the Polish People's Republic was replaced by the Third Republic of Poland. In 1997, the voivodeship had a population of 309 000 people, and had an area of 5 348 km^{2}. It existed until 31 December 1998, when it was partitioned between then-established Lublin, and Masovian Voivodeships.

== Subdivisions ==
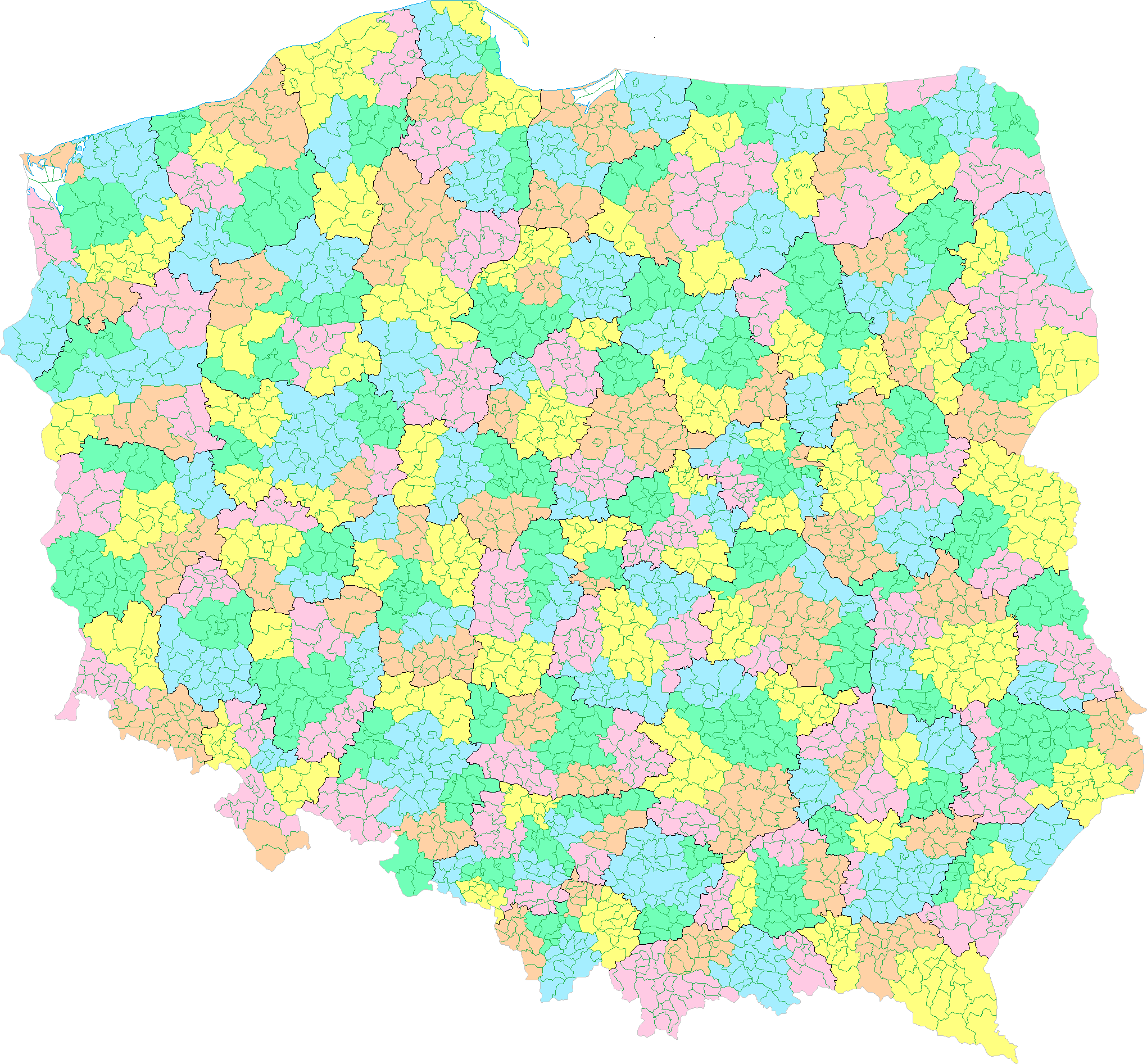
The district offices and gminas (municipalities) of Poland in 1998, including the Biała Podlaska Voivodeship.

In 1997, the voivodeship was divided into 40 gminas (municipalities), including four urban municipalities, two urban-rural municipalities, and 34 rural municipalities. It had six cities that functioned as separate municipalities.

From 1990 to 1998, it was additionally divided into three district offices, each comprising several municipalities.

== Demographics ==
Year	Population
1975	280 400
1980	286 400
1985	297 900
1990	305 300
1995	309 400
1997	309 000

== Leaders ==
The leader of the administrative division was the voivode. The people in that office, between 1975, and 1998, were:

- 1975–1986: Józef Piela;
- 1986–1990: Stanisław Rapa;
- 1990–1992: Andrzej Czapski;
- 1992–1997: Tadeusz Korszeń;
- 1997–1998: Marek Czarnecki.
