= Korytowo, Masovian Voivodeship =

Korytowo
- Village
- Location within Poland
- Coordinates: 52°36′N 20°12′E
- Country: Poland
- Voivodeship: Masovian
- County: Płońsk
- Gmina: Dzierzążnia

Korytowo [kɔrɨˈtɔvɔ] is a village in the administrative district of Gmina Dzierzążnia, within Płońsk County, Masovian Voivodeship, in east-central Poland.
