= Korytowo, Kuyavian-Pomeranian Voivodeship =

Village in Kociewie

Korytowo
- Village
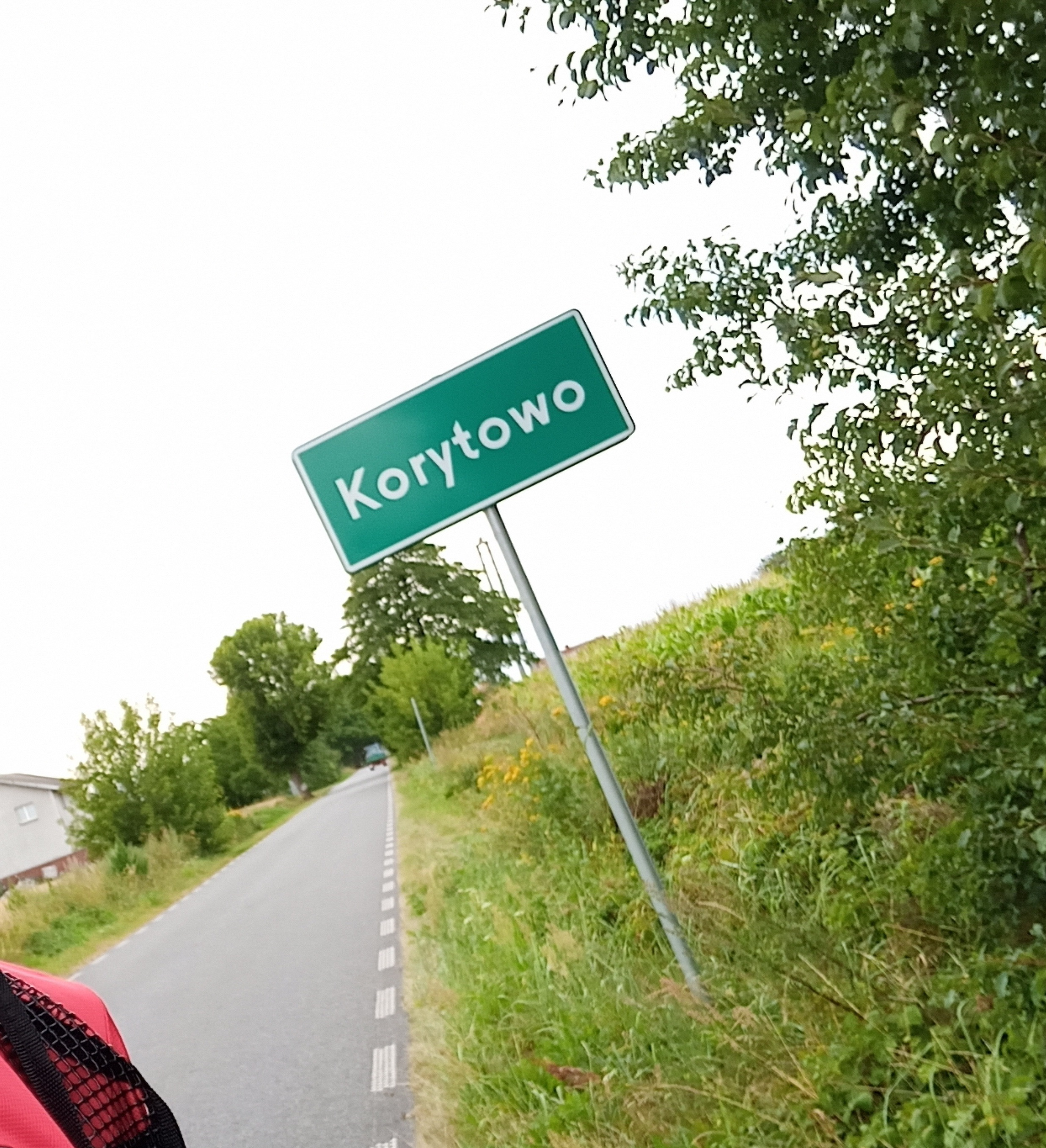
- Photograph of the village's roadsign taken at a Dutch angle, 2022

- Location within Poland
- Coordinates: 53°24′N 18°12′E
- Country: Poland
- Voivodeship: Kuyavian-Pomeranian
- County: Świecie
- Gmina: Bukowiec
- Population: 300

Korytowo [kɔrɨˈtɔvɔ] is a village in the administrative district of Gmina Bukowiec, within Świecie County, Kuyavian-Pomeranian Voivodeship, in north-central Poland.
