= Polskie Łąki =

Village in Kociewie

- Village
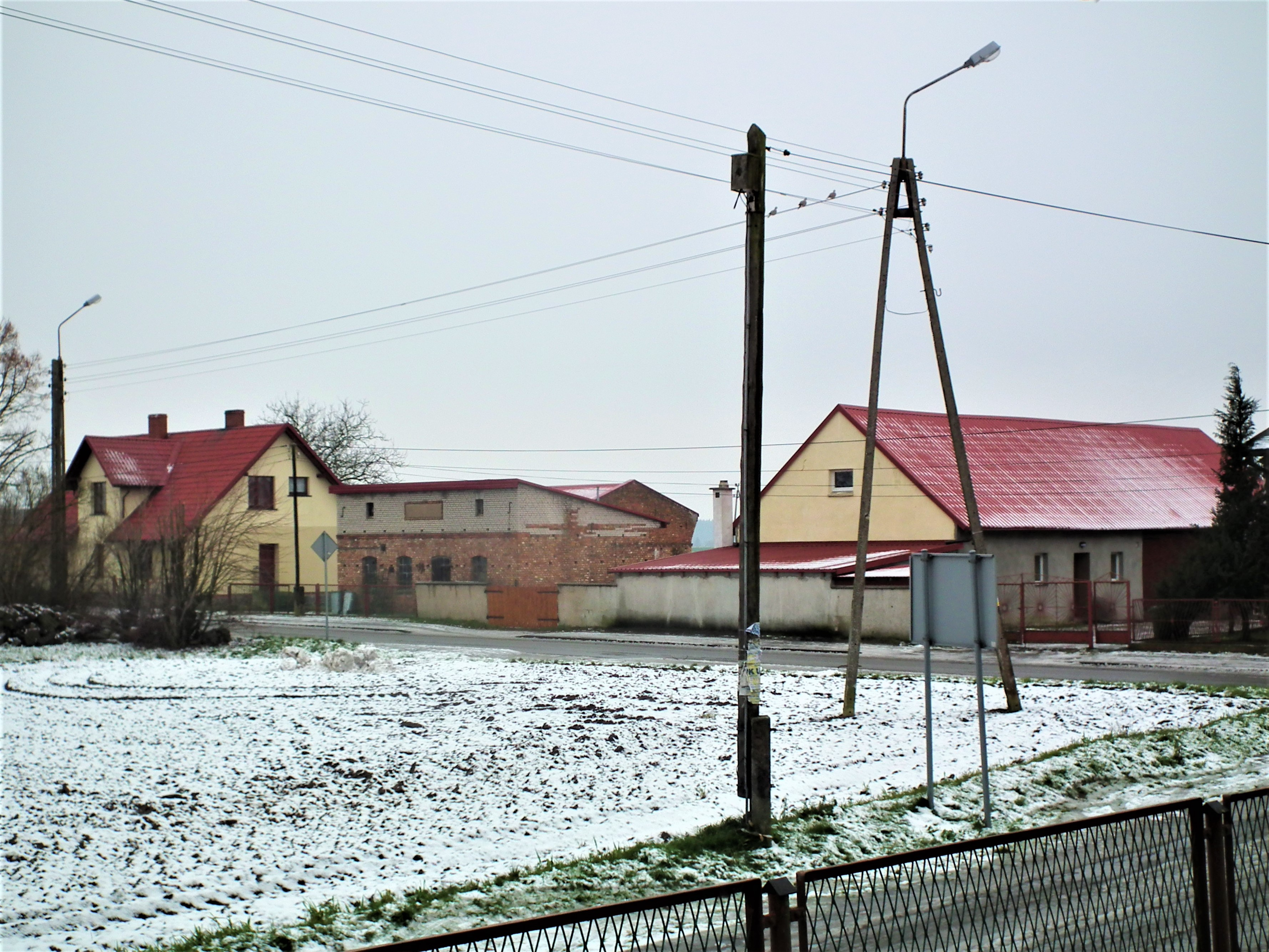

- Location within Poland
- Coordinates: 53°24′25″N 18°13′19″E
- Country: Poland
- Voivodeship: Kuyavian-Pomeranian
- County: Świecie
- Gmina: Bukowiec

Polskie Łąki [ˈpɔlskʲɛ ˈwɔŋki] is a village in the administrative district of Gmina Bukowiec, within Świecie County, Kuyavian-Pomeranian Voivodeship, in north-central Poland.
