= Przysiersk =

Village in Kociewie

- Village
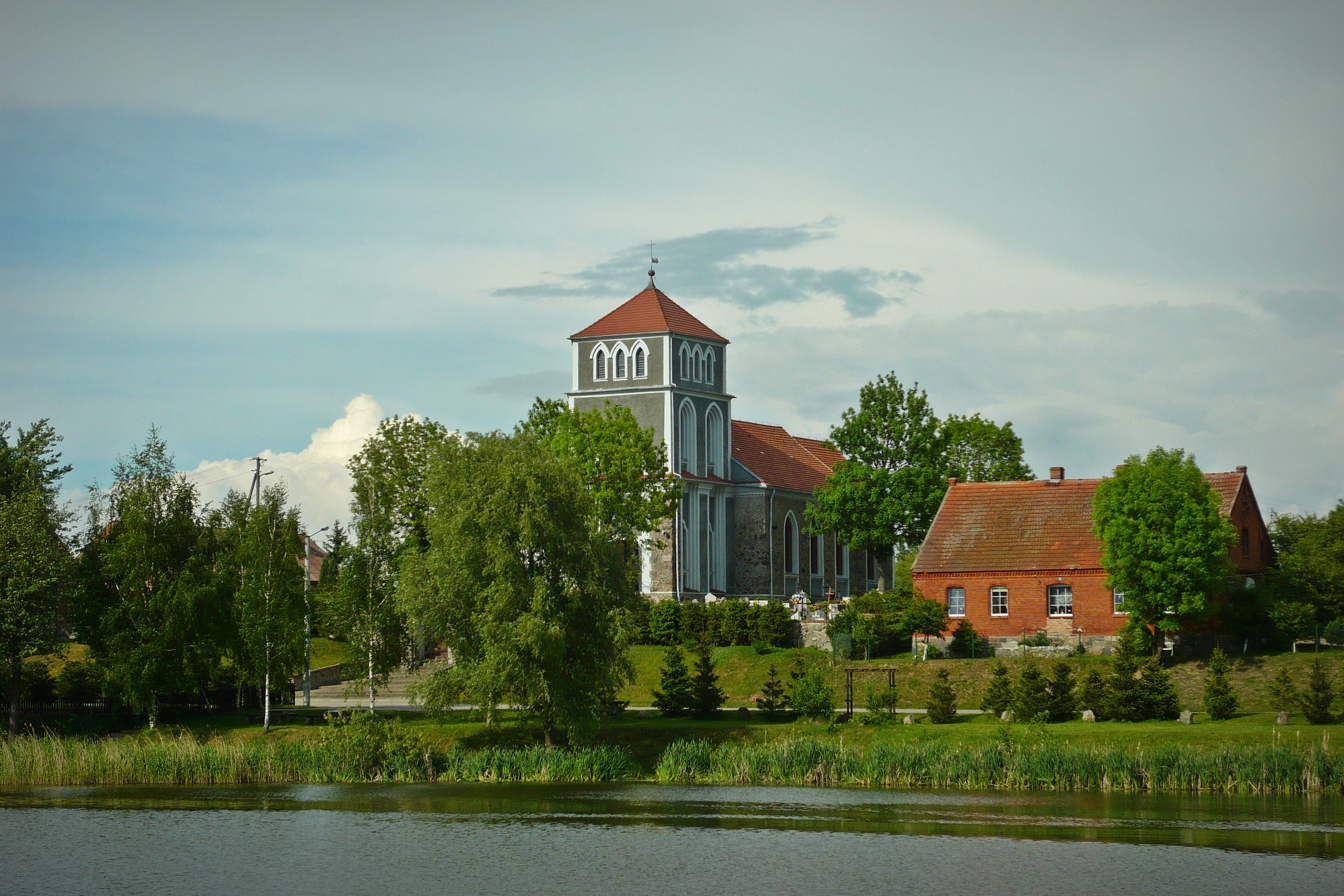

- Location within Poland
- Coordinates: 53°25′45″N 18°18′25″E
- Country: Poland
- Voivodeship: Kuyavian-Pomeranian
- County: Świecie
- Gmina: Bukowiec

Population
  - Total: 780
- Time zone: UTC+1 (CET)
  - Summer (DST): UTC+2 (CEST)
- Vehicle registration: CSW

Przysiersk [ˈpʂɨɕɛrsk] (German: Heinrichsdorf) is a village in the administrative district of Gmina Bukowiec, within Świecie County, Kuyavian-Pomeranian Voivodeship, in north-central Poland.

== History ==
Przysiersk was a royal village of the Kingdom of Poland, administratively located in the Świecie County in the Pomeranian Voivodeship.

Following the joint German-Soviet invasion of Poland, which started World War II in September 1939, the village was occupied by Germany until 1945. The local school principal was among Poles from the region, who were massacred by the Selbstschutz in Mniszek in 1939 during the genocidal Intelligenzaktion campaign. In February 1941, the occupiers carried out expulsions of Poles, who were deported to a transit camp in Tczew, while their houses were handed over to German colonists as part of the Lebensraum policy.
