= Bukowiec, Świecie County =

Village in Kuyavian-Pomeranian Voivodeship, Poland

Bukowiec
- Village
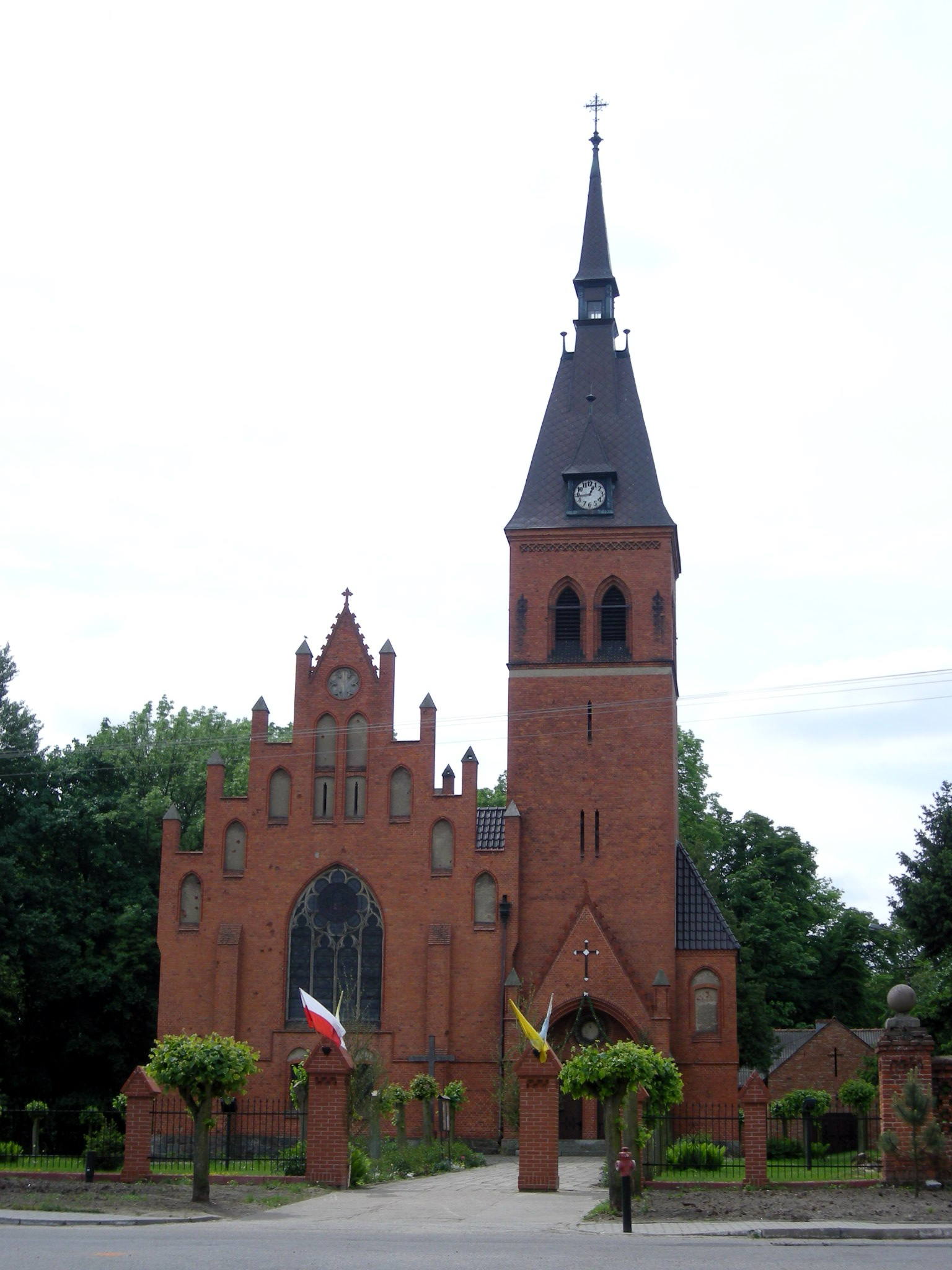
- Virgin Mary Queen of Poland church in Bukowiec

- Location within Poland
- Coordinates: 53°25′54″N 18°14′20″E
- Country: Poland
- Voivodeship: Kuyavian-Pomeranian
- County: Świecie
- Gmina: Bukowiec

Population
  - Total: 1,210
- Time zone: UTC+1 (CET)
  - Summer (DST): UTC+2 (CEST)
- Vehicle registration: CSW

Bukowiec [buˈkɔvjɛt͡s] is a village in Świecie County, Kuyavian-Pomeranian Voivodeship, in north-central Poland. It is the seat of the gmina (administrative district) called Gmina Bukowiec. It is located within the ethnocultural region of Kociewie in the historic region of Pomerania.
