= Kućice, Zavidovići =

Kučice
- Village
- Location within Bosnia and Herzegovina
- Coordinates: 44.400020°N 18.167520°E
- Country: Bosnia and Herzegovina
- Entity: Federation of Bosnia and Herzegovina
- Canton: Zenica-Doboj
- Municipality: Zavidovići

Area
  - Total: 1.10 sq mi (2.86 km^{2})

Population (2013)
  - Total: 172
  - Density: 156/sq mi (60.1/km^{2})
- Time zone: UTC+1 (CET)
  - Summer (DST): UTC+2 (CEST)

Kućice is a village in the municipality of Zavidovići, Bosnia and Herzegovina.

== Demographics ==
According to the 2013 census, its population was 172.

Ethnicity in 2013
Ethnicity	Number	Percentage
Bosniaks	171	99.4%
other/undeclared	1	0.6%
Total	172	100%
