= Ostrołęka Voivodeship =

Former administrative division of Poland

Coordinates: 53°05′04″N 21°33′57″E

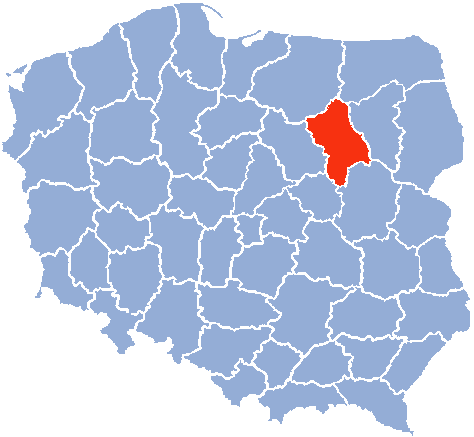
Ostroleka Voivodeship

Ostrołęka Voivodeship (Polish: województwo ostrołęckie) was a unit of administrative division and local government in Poland in the period 1975–1998. It was superseded by Masovian Voivodeship. Ostrołęka.

== Major cities and towns ==
Population on 31 December 1998.

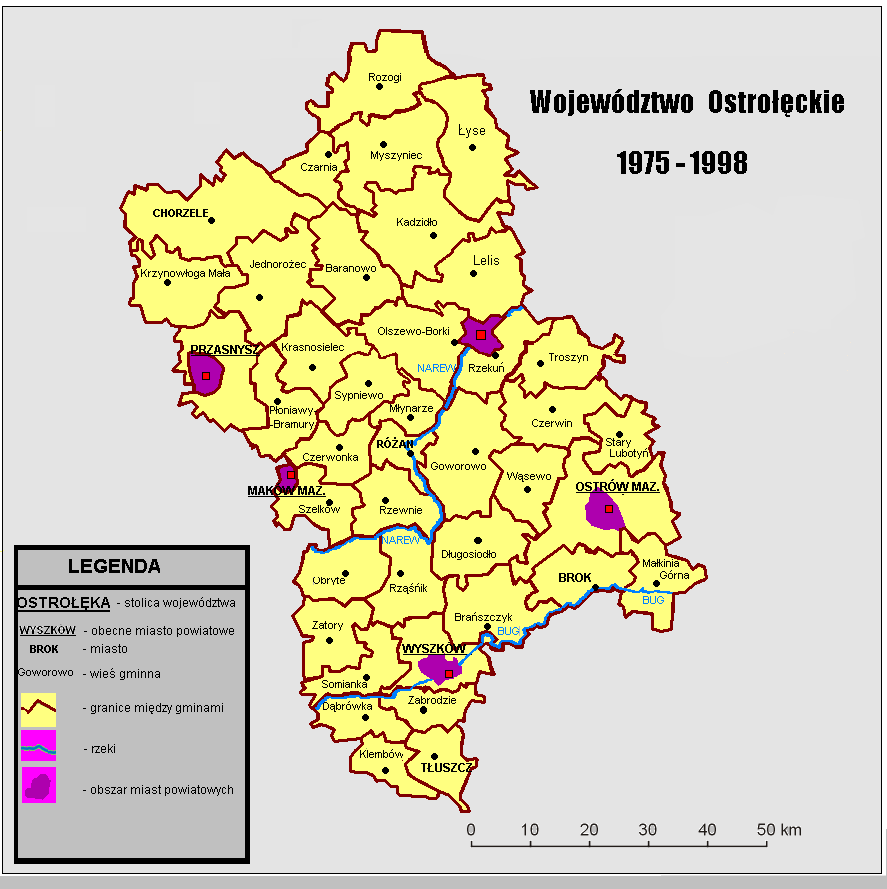
Map of the Ostrołęka region

- Ostrołęka - 55 271
- Wyszków - 26 154
- Ostrów Mazowiecka - 22 592
- Przasnysz - 17 556
- Maków Mazowiecki - 10 651
- Tłuszcz - 6 708
- Różan - 2 906
- Myszyniec - 2 815
- Chorzele - 2 643
- Brok - 1 918

== See also ==
- Voivodeships of Poland
