= Radom Voivodeship =

Former administrative division of Poland

Coordinates: 51°24′17″N 21°09′25″E

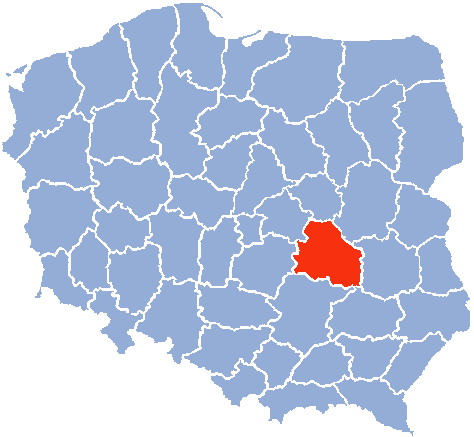
Radom Voivodeship

Radom Voivodeship (Polish: województwo radomskie) was a unit of administrative division and local government in Poland in the years 1975–1998, superseded by Masovian Voivodeship. Its capital city was Radom.

== Major cities and towns (population in 1995) ==
- Radom (232,300)
- Pionki (22,100)
- Kozienice (21,500)

== See also ==
- Voivodeship
- Voivodeships of Poland
