= 16th Greater Poland Uhlan Regiment =

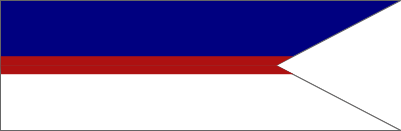
- Active: 1919–1939
- Country: Poland
- Branch: Polish Army
- Type: Cavalry
- Engagements: Polish-Soviet War, World War II

16th Greater Poland Uhlan Regiment of General Gustaw Orlicz-Dreszer (Polish: 16 Pulk Ulanow Wielkopolskich im. gen. dyw. Gustawa Orlicz-Dreszera, 16 p.ul.) was a cavalry unit of the Polish Army in the Second Polish Republic. In the interbellum period, it was garrisoned in the city of Bydgoszcz.

The traditions of the regiment date back to the Napoleonic Wars and the Duchy of Warsaw. In 1809, a cavalry unit was formed in Podolia, by Colonel Marcin Tarnowski. The unit was later named 16th Uhlan Regiment of the Duchy of Warsaw, and it was garrisoned in Lublin. Currently, traditions of the regiment are continued by the 7th Pomeranian Brigade of Coastal Defence (7. Pomorska Brygada Obrony Wybrzeza).

On December 29, 1918, in the town of Lwówek, Provinz Posen, a cavalry unit was formed by Sergeant Wojciech Swierczek. The unit consisted of ethnic Poles from Greater Poland, who had served in the Imperial German Army. On January 5, the unit, commanded by Swierczek, became part of the Greater Poland Army, fighting against Germany in the Greater Poland Uprising (1918–19). In May 1919, the Second Regiment of Greater Poland Uhlans, based on the unit of Sergeant Swierczek, was formed in Biedrusko.

On November 18, 1919, in front of the town hall in Poznań, Colonel Paslawski of the regiment received a flag, handed to him by General Jozef Dowbor-Musnicki. The flag featured the Mother of God on one side, and a red cross with a white eagle in the middle on the other side. Buried during World War II, it is now kept at the Polish Army Museum in Warsaw.

On January 24, 1920, the regiment entered Bydgoszcz, to stay there until 1939. It was garrisoned in the barracks located on Szubinska Street. In March 1920, after renaming into 16th Greater Poland Uhlan Regiment, the unit was transported east, to fight in the Polish-Soviet War. It distinguished itself in several battles and clashes.

In 1938, the regiment was named after General Gustaw Orlicz-Dreszer.

Mobilized in late August 1939, the regiment, commanded by Colonel Julian Arnoldt-Russocki, was ordered to defend the positions in the Tuchola Forest, near Chojnice and Tuchola. After heavy fighting against panzer units of General Heinz Guderian and being bombed by the Luftwaffe, the regiment ceased to exist on September 7. By that time, it had lost 40% of its soldiers.

The regiment had its own zurawiejka: "Even though they are drinking straight from the barrel, they are not drunk, the uhlans from Bydgoszcz."

== See also ==
- Polish cavalry

== Sources ==
- Roman Abraham: Wspomnienia wojenne znad Warty i Bzury. Warsaw: Wydawnictwo Ministerstwa Obrony Narodowej, 1990
- Kazimierz Satora: Opowieści wrześniowych sztandarów. Warsaw: Instytut Wydawniczy Pax, 1990
