= Voivodeships of Poland (1975–1998) =

Historical administrative divisions of Poland

The Polish administrative regions from 1975 to 1998

The voivodeships of Poland from 1975 to 1998 were created as part of a two-tier method for administering the country and its regions. Between June 1, 1975, and December 31, 1998, pursuant to a law proclaimed on May 28, 1975, Poland was administratively divided into 49 voivodeships, consolidating and eliminating the intermediate administrative level of counties.

The scheme meant that most voivodeships had fewer than 1,000,000 inhabitants. Each voivodeship took its name from a small- or medium-sized town situated near its centre, which would become its capital.

== History ==
An unstated reason for the reform was the desire of the Polish Central Committee to strengthen control over lower layers of the state apparatus. After Edward Gierek replaced Władysław Gomułka as first secretary of the Polish United Workers' Party, his clique maintained power by dividing the Politburo.

Through administrative reorganization and the new territorial division, Gierek was able to nominate his supporters to provincial committees and break the hold of older elements of the party.

On the date the system took effect (1 June 1975), the 49 voivodeships were further subdivided into 2,343 municipalities plus 814 cities, including four cities with special status — Warsaw, Łódź, Kraków and Wrocław — for a total of 3,157 municipal governments serving as secondary administrative units.

Warsaw Voivodeship had the status of a metropolitan voivodeship, and the Łódź and Kraków Voivodeships were called urban voivodeships. The appointed mayor of each voivodeship's capital city also served as the provincial governor. Initially, the city of Wrocław was a separate administrative division within the Wrocław Voivodeship.

During 1991 and 1992 the large municipalities were restructured, significantly changing the division of powers between the provincial cities and the surrounding rural communities (Laws of 1991, ch. 2, sec. 9, ch. 3, sec. 12 and ch. 87, sec. 397).

In the Polish administrative reform of 1999 Poland introduced a further reform of local government administration, establishing the present 16 voivodeships with new districts.

== Cities ==
In 1975 many towns that had previously been large communal villages were incorporated as cities.

During the second half of the 1970s eight towns lost their civic rights and were merged into neighbouring cities, while several cities that had previously lost their identity and absorbed into metropolitan conurbations regained their independence: Poręba, Sławków, Międzyzdroje, Bieruń, Lędziny, Wojkowice, Rydułtowy, Pszów, Miasteczko Śląskie, Imielin, Radlin, Radzionków and Zagórz.

== List of voivodeships ==
From 1975 until 1998 Poland was divided into the following voivodeships:

| Map location | Voivodeship | Provincial capital | Area, km^{2} (1998) | Population (1998) | Cities | Gmina |
|---|---|---|---|---|---|---|
| | Biała Podlaska; Voivodeship | Biała Podlaska | 5,348 | 309,900 | 6 | 35 |
| | Białystok; Voivodeship | Białystok | 10,055 | 701,400 | 17 | 49 |
| | Bielsko-Biała; Voivodeship | Bielsko-Biała | 3,704 | 927,500 | 18 | 59 |
| | Bydgoszcz; Voivodeship | Bydgoszcz | 10,349 | 1,136,900 | 27 | 55 |
| | Chełm; Voivodeship | Chełm | 3,866 | 248,800 | 4 | 25 |
| | Ciechanów; Voivodeship | Ciechanów | 6,362 | 437,400 | 9 | 45 |
| | Częstochowa; Voivodeship | Częstochowa | 6,182 | 779,600 | 17 | 49 |
| | Elbląg; Voivodeship | Elbląg | 6,103 | 495,100 | 15 | 37 |
| | Gdańsk; Voivodeship | Gdańsk | 7,394 | 1,469,400 | 19 | 43 |
| | Gorzów Wielkopolski; Voivodeship | Gorzów, Wielkopolski | 8,484 | 514,300 | 21 | 38 |
| | Jelenia Góra; Voivodeship | Jelenia Góra | 4,379 | 523,700 | 24 | 28 |
| | Kalisz; Voivodeship | Kalisz | 6,512 | 724,800 | 20 | 53 |
| | Katowice; Voivodeship | Katowice | 6,650 | 3,894,900 | 43 | 46 |
| | Kielce; Voivodeship | Kielce | 9,211 | 1,131,700 | 17 | 69 |
| | Konin; Voivodeship | Konin | 5,139 | 480,800 | 18 | 45 |
| | Koszalin; Voivodeship | Koszalin | 8,470 | 527,600 | 17 | 35 |
| | Kraków; Voivodeship | Kraków | 3,254 | 1,245,000 | 10 | 38 |
| | Krosno; Voivodeship | Krosno | 5,702 | 510,100 | 12 | 37 |
| | Legnica; Voivodeship | Legnica | 4,037 | 525,600 | 11 | 31 |
| | Leszno; Voivodeship | Leszno | 4,154 | 399,500 | 19 | 28 |
| | Lublin; Voivodeship | Lublin | 6,792 | 1,027,300 | 16 | 62 |
| | Łomża; Voivodeship | Łomża | 6,684 | 352,900 | 12 | 39 |
| | Łódź; Voivodeship | Łódź | 1,524 | 1,099,700 | 8 | 11 |
| | Nowy Sącz; Voivodeship | Nowy Sącz | 5,576 | 747,500 | 14 | 41 |
| | Olsztyn; Voivodeship | Olsztyn | 12,327 | 778,200 | 21 | 48 |
| | Opole; Voivodeship | Opole | 8,535 | 1,022,100 | 29 | 61 |
| | Ostrołęka; Voivodeship | Ostrołęka | 6,498 | 411,600 | 9 | 38 |
| | Piła; Voivodeship | Piła | 8,205 | 496,900 | 24 | 35 |
| | Piotrków; Voivodeship | Piotrków Trybunalski | 6,266 | 642,200 | 10 | 51 |
| | Płock; Voivodeship | Płock | 5,117 | 520,900 | 9 | 44 |
| | Poznań; Voivodeship | Poznań | 8,151 | 1,363,600 | 33 | 57 |
| | Przemyśl; Voivodeship | Przemyśl | 4,437 | 415,600 | 9 | 35 |
| | Radom; Voivodeship | Radom | 7,294 | 763,300 | 15 | 61 |
| | Rzeszów; Voivodeship | Rzeszów | 4,397 | 648,900 | 13 | 41 |
| | Siedlce; Voivodeship | Siedlce | 8,499 | 661,400 | 12 | 66 |
| | Sieradz; Voivodeship | Sieradz | 4,868 | 411,500 | 9 | 40 |
| | Skierniewice; Voivodeship | Skierniewice | 3,960 | 423,700 | 8 | 36 |
| | Słupsk; Voivodeship | Słupsk | 7,453 | 429,700 | 11 | 31 |
| | Suwałki; Voivodeship | Suwałki | 10,490 | 489,200 | 14 | 42 |
| | Szczecin; Voivodeship | Szczecin | 9,982 | 995,200 | 29 | 50 |
| | Tarnobrzeg; Voivodeship | Tarnobrzeg | 6,283 | 609,100 | 14 | 46 |
| | Tarnów; Voivodeship | Tarnów | 4,151 | 700,800 | 9 | 41 |
| | Toruń; Voivodeship | Toruń | 5,348 | 674,800 | 13 | 41 |
| | Wałbrzych; Voivodeship | Wałbrzych | 4,168 | 733,000 | 31 | 30 |
| | Warszawa; Voivodeship | Warsaw | 3,788 | 2,419,800 | 27 | 32 |
| | Włocławek; Voivodeship | Włocławek | 4,402 | 434,700 | 14 | 30 |
| | Wrocław; Voivodeship | Wrocław | 6,287 | 1,136,700 | 16 | 33 |
| | Zamość; Voivodeship | Zamość | 6,980 | 489,300 | 5 | 47 |
| | Zielona Góra; Voivodeship | Zielona Góra | 8,868 | 679,300 | 26 | 50 |

== See also ==
- Voivodeships of Poland
