= Ciechanów Voivodeship =

Former administrative division of Poland

Coordinates: 52°52′53″N 20°36′59″E

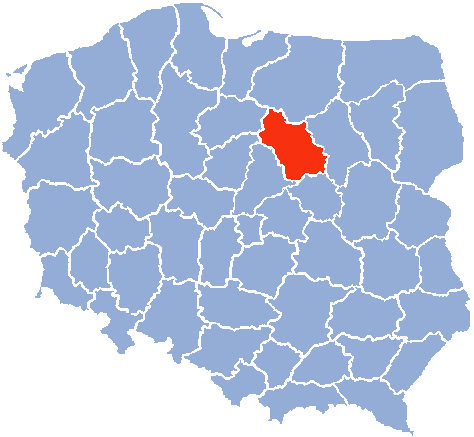
Ciechanów Voivodeship

Ciechanów Voivodeship (Polish: województwo ciechanowskie) was a unit of administrative division and local government in Poland in years 1975–1998, superseded by the Masovian Voivodeship. Its capital city was Ciechanów.

== Major cities and towns (population in 1995) ==
- Ciechanów (46,600)
- Mława (29,800)
- Płońsk (22,700)
- Działdowo (20,700)

== See also ==
- Voivodeships of Poland
