= Leszek Miller cabinet =

Government of Poland (2001–2004)

- 10th Cabinet of Poland
- 2001–2004
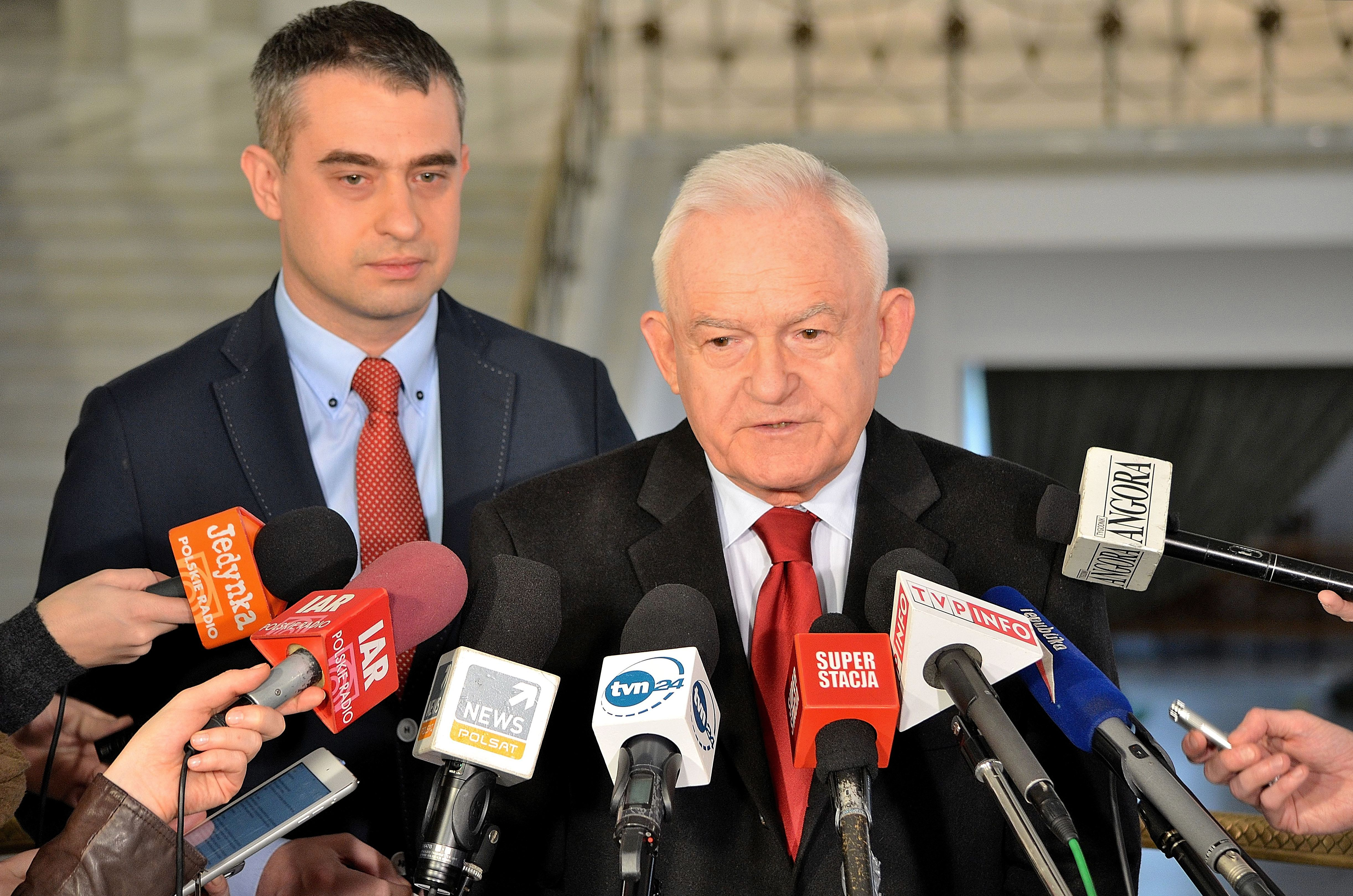
- Leszek Miller (2014)
- Date formed: 19 October 2001
- Date dissolved: 2 May 2004

People and organisations
- President: Aleksander Kwaśniewski
- Prime Minister: Leszek Miller
- Deputy Prime Minister: Marek Belka (2001–2002); Jarosław Kalinowski (2001–2003); Marek Pol (2001–2004); Jerzy Hausner (2003–2004); Grzegorz Kołodko (2002–2003); Józef Oleksy (2004)
- Ministers removed: 16 resigned
- Member party: Democratic Left Alliance; Labour Union; Polish People's Party (until 2003)
- Status in legislature: Majority (coalition) (2001–2003); Minority (coalition) (2003–2004)
- Opposition party: Civic Platform; Samoobrona (confidence 2001–2003); Law and Justice; League of Polish Families; Polish People's Party (after 2003)
- Opposition leader: Maciej Płażyński (until 2003); Donald Tusk

History
- Election: 2001 parliamentary election
- Predecessor: Buzek
- Successor: Belka I

The Cabinet of Leszek Miller was appointed on 19 October 2001, passed the vote of confidence on 26 October 2001, and 13 June 2003.

== The Cabinet ==
Office	Image	Name	Party	from	To
Prime Minister		Leszek Miller	Democratic Left Alliance	19 October 2001	2 May 2004
Chairman of the Committee for European Integration		Leszek Miller	Democratic Left Alliance	19 October 2001	2 May 2004
Deputy Prime Minister		Marek Belka	Democratic Left Alliance	19 October 2001	6 July 2002
Minister of Finance		Marek Belka	Democratic Left Alliance	19 October 2001	6 July 2002
Deputy Prime Minister		Jarosław Kalinowski	Polish People's Party	19 October 2001	3 March 2003
Minister of Agriculture and Rural Development		Jarosław Kalinowski	Polish People's Party	19 October 2001	3 March 2003
Deputy Prime Minister		Marek Pol	Labour Union	19 October 2001	2 May 2004
Minister of Infrastructure		Marek Pol	Labour Union	19 October 2001	2 May 2004
Minister of Labour and Social Policy		Jerzy Hausner	Democratic Left Alliance	19 October 2001	7 January 2003
Minister of Economy, Labour and Social Policy		Jerzy Hausner	Democratic Left Alliance	7 January 2003	2 May 2004
Deputy Prime Minister		Jerzy Hausner	Democratic Left Alliance	16 June 2003	2 May 2004
Deputy Prime Minister		Grzegorz Kołodko	Independent	6 July 2002	16 June 2003
Minister of Finance		Grzegorz Kołodko	Independent	6 July 2002	16 June 2003
Deputy Prime Minister		Józef Oleksy	Democratic Left Alliance	21 January 2004	21 April 2004
Minister of Interior and Administration		Józef Oleksy	Democratic Left Alliance	21 January 2004	21 April 2004
Minister of Economy		Jacek Piechota	Democratic Left Alliance	19 October 2001	7 June 2003
Minister of Foreign Affairs		Włodzimierz Cimoszewicz	Democratic Left Alliance	19 October 2001	2 May 2004
Minister of National Defence		Jerzy Szmajdziński	Democratic Left Alliance	19 October 2001	2 May 2004
Minister of Interior and Administration		Krzysztof Janik	Democratic Left Alliance	19 October 2001	21 January 2004
Minister of Environment		Stanisław Żelichowski	Polish People's Party	19 October 2001	3 March 2003
Minister of Culture		Andrzej Celiński	Democratic Left Alliance	19 October 2001	6 July 2002
Minister of Health		Mariusz Łapiński	Democratic Left Alliance	19 October 2001	17 January 2003
Minister of State Treasury		Wiesław Kaczmarek	Democratic Left Alliance	19 October 2001	7 January 2003
Minister of Science		Michał Kleiber	Independent	19 October 2001	2 May 2004
Minister of National Education and Sport		Krystyna Łybacka	Democratic Left Alliance	19 October 2001	2 May 2004
Minister of Justice; Public Prosecutor General		Barbara Piwnik	Independent	19 October 2001	6 July 2002
Minister of Culture		Waldemar Dąbrowski	Independent	6 July 2002	2 May 2004
Minister, Member of the Council of Ministers		Lech Nikolski	Democratic Left Alliance	7 January 2003	2 May 2004
Minister of Finance		Andrzej Raczko	Independent	16 June 2003	2 May 2004
Minister of Environment		Czesław Śleziak	Democratic Left Alliance	3 March 2003	2 May 2004
Minister of Agriculture and Rural Development		Adam Tański	Independent	3 March 2003	2 July 2003
Minister of State Treasury		Sławomir Cytrycki	Democratic Left Alliance	7 January 2003	2 April 2003
Minister of Health		Marek Balicki	Independent	17 January 2003	2 April 2003
Minister, Member of the Council of Ministers		Danuta Hübner	Independent	16 June 2003	30 April 2004
Minister of Agriculture and Rural Development		Wojciech Olejniczak	Democratic Left Alliance	2 July 2003	2 May 2004
Minister of State Treasury		Piotr Czyżewski	Independent	2 April 2003	21 January 2004
Minister of Health		Leszek Sikorski	Democratic Left Alliance	2 April 2003	2 May 2004
Minister of Justice; Public Prosecutor General		Grzegorz Kurczuk	Democratic Left Alliance	6 July 2002	2 May 2004
Minister of State Treasury		Zbigniew Kaniewski	Democratic Left Alliance	28 January 2004	2 May 2004

Vote of confidence in the Cabinet of Leszek Miller
Ballot →	26 October 2001
Required majority →	224 out of 446
Votes in favour: • SLD (196); • SRP (53); • PSL (40); • UP (14); • LPR (1); • Independents (2)	306 / 446
Votes against: • PO (62); • PiS (42); • LPR (32); • SLD (1); • Independents (3)	140 / 446
Absent: • SLD (3); • PO (3); • LPR (2); • UP (2); • PiS (1); • LPR (1)	13 / 446
