= Ministry of Economy (Poland) =

Former government ministry of Poland

- Ministerstwo Gospodarki
- Official governmental wall plaque

- Ministerial logotype

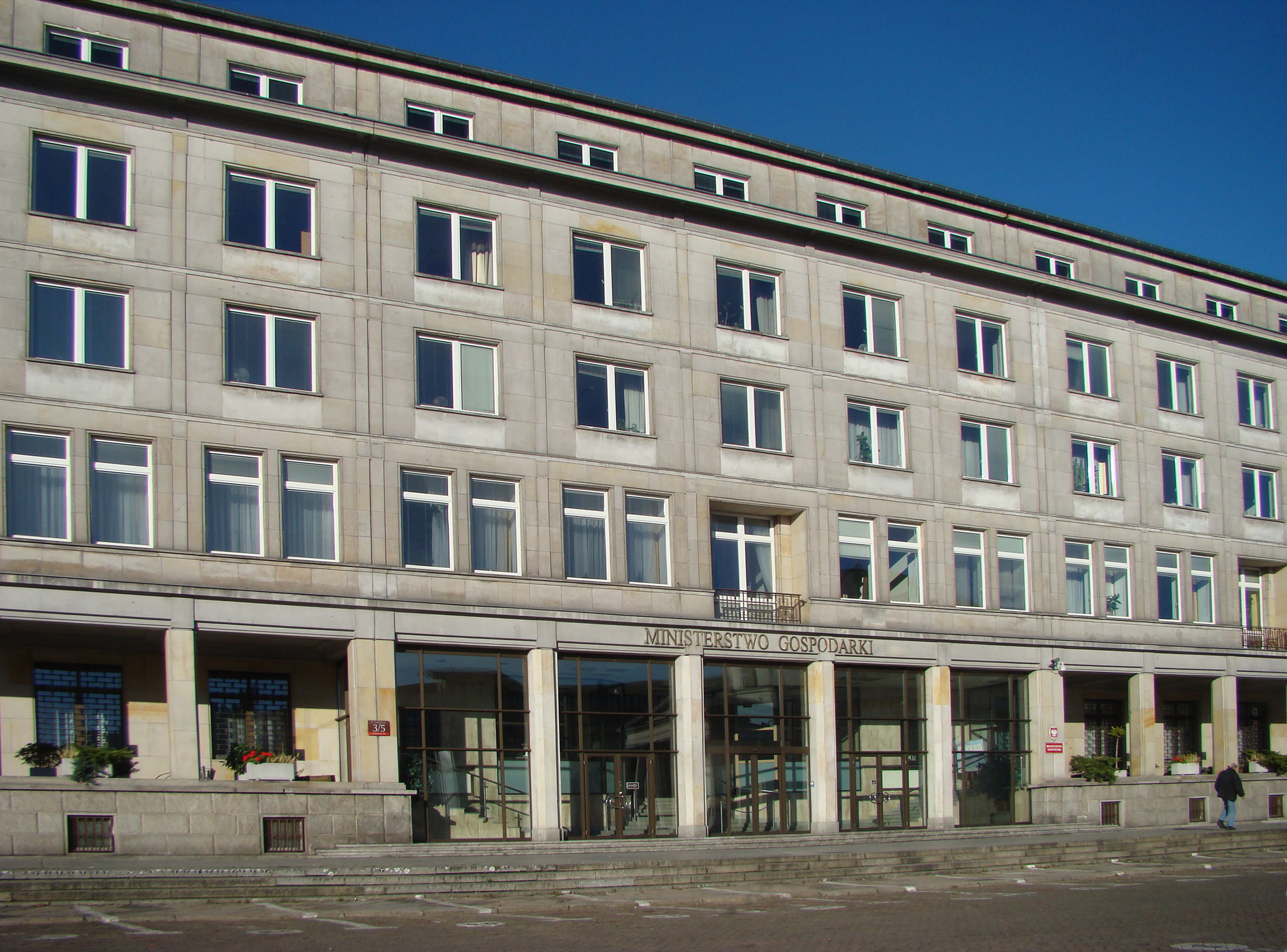
- Ministry headquarters

Agency overview
- Headquarters: Pl. Trzech Krzyży 15/17, Warsaw
- Agency executive: Janusz Piechociński, Minister for Economy; First Deputy Minister
- Parent agency: Council of Ministers
- Website: www.mg.gov.pl

Ministry of Economy of the Republic of Poland (Polish: Ministerstwo Gospodarki) was a ministry dealing with economy of Republic of Poland.

Created in 1997 from reforms and mergers of other ministries, it has gone through several name changes and has recently been downsized, with issues related to work being split to Ministry of Labour and Social Policy and regional issues split to Ministry of Regional Development. In 2007 the bureau of tourism was moved to Ministry of Sport.

The last minister was Janusz Piechociński. In late 2015 it was merged into the new Ministry of Development.

== List of ministers ==
=== Ministers for Economy (1997–2003) ===
portrait	Name	Party	Term Of Office		Prime Minister (cabinet)
	Wiesław Kaczmarek	SdRP	4 February 1997	31 October 1997	Włodzimierz Cimoszewicz (Cimoszewicz)
	Janusz Steinhoff	Agreement of Polish Christian Democrats	31 October 1997	19 October 2001	Jerzy Buzek (Buzek)
	Jacek Piechota	Democratic Left Alliance	19 October 2001	7 January 2003	Leszek Miller (Miller)
Ministers for Economy, Labour and Social Policy (2003–2004)
	Jerzy Hausner	Democratic Left Alliance	7 January 2003	2 May 2004	Leszek Miller (Miller)
Ministers for Economy and Labour (2004–2005)
	Jerzy Hausner	Democratic Left Alliance	2 May 2004	31 March 2005	Marek Belka (Belka I)
	Jacek Piechota	Democratic Left Alliance	31 March 2005	31 October 2005	Marek Belka (Belka II)
Ministers for Economy (2005–2015)
	Piotr Woźniak	Nonpartisan	31 October 2005	7 September 2007	Kazimierz Marcinkiewicz (Marcinkiewicz Jarosław Kaczyński (Kaczyński)
	Jarosław Kaczyński (acting)	Law and Justice	7 September 2007	11 September 2007	Jarosław Kaczyński (Kaczyński)
	Piotr Woźniak	Nonpartisan	11 September 2007	16 November 2007	Jarosław Kaczyński (Kaczyński)
	Waldemar Pawlak	Polish People's Party	16 November 2007	27 November 2012	Donald Tusk (Tusk I), (Tusk II)
	Janusz Piechociński	Polish People's Party	27 November 2012	16 November 2015	Donald Tusk (Tusk II) Ewa Kopacz (Kopacz)
