= Piotr Woźniak (geologist) =

Polish public servant and geologist

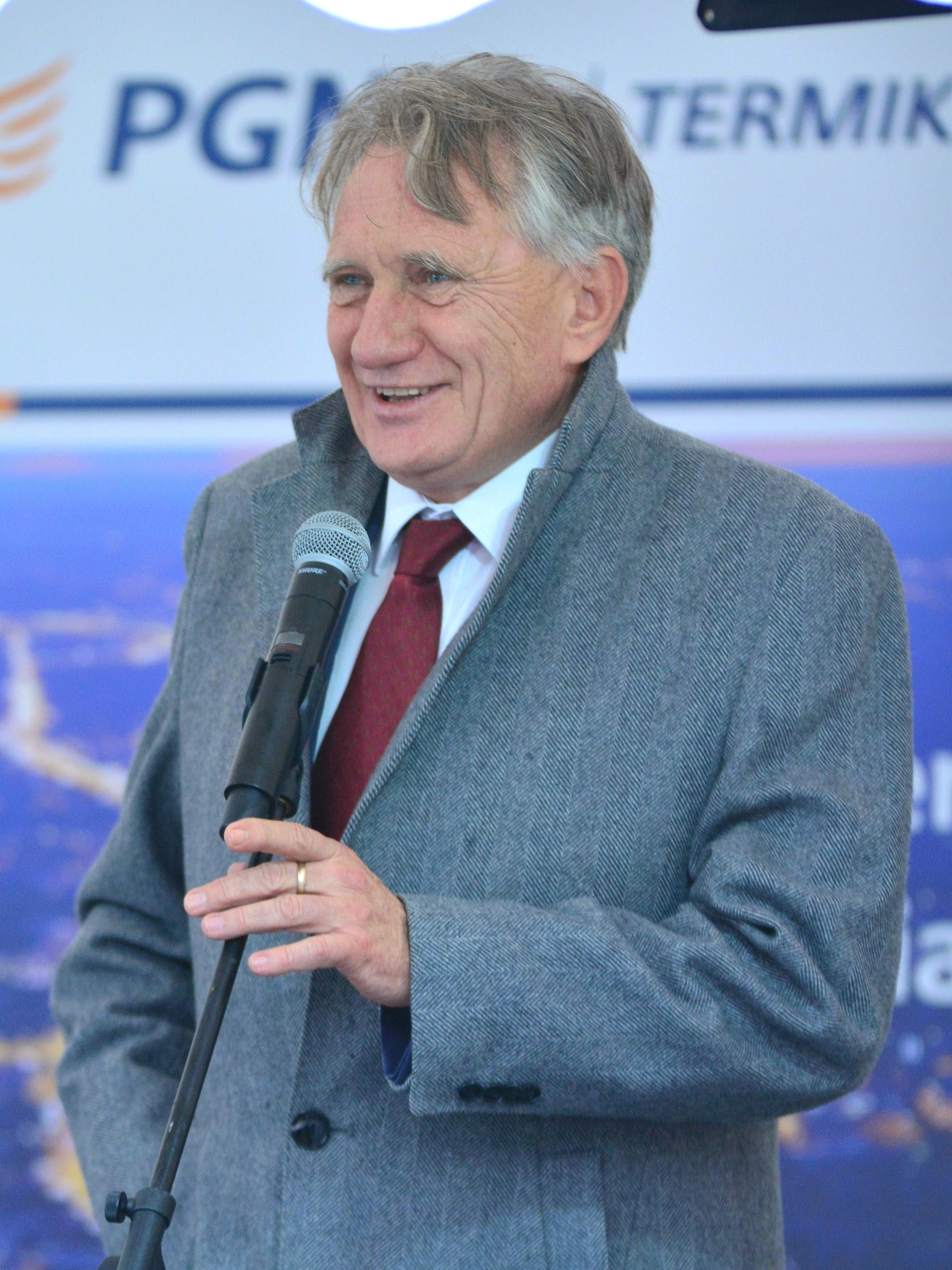

Minister of Economy
- In office 31 October 2005 – 7 September 2007
- Prime Minister: Kazimierz Marcinkiewicz; Jarosław Kaczyński
- Preceded by: Jacek Piechota
- Succeeded by: Waldemar Pawlak

Personal details
- Born: 28 April 1959 (age 67) Warsaw, People's Republic of Poland
- Education: University of Warsaw
- Profession: Geologist, politician
- Awards: Order of Polonia Restituta; Cross of Merit

Piotr Grzegorz Woźniak (born 13 February 1956 in Warsaw) is a Polish politician and geologist. Between 2005 and 2007 he served as Minister of Economy, between 2011 and 2013 he was Undersecretary of State at the Ministry of Environment and Chief State Geologist, since 2016 he has been serving as President of the Management Board of the Polish Oil and Gas Company (PGNiG).

== Education and career ==
Piotr Woźniak graduated from Faculty of Geology, University of Warsaw, in 1980. Between 1980–1984 and 1986–1989 he worked as assistant at the Polish Geological Institute. Between 1990 and 1991 he served as an advisor to the Minister of Industry, and chaired the Committee for Appointment of Government Representative for Promotion of Entrepreneurship. Between 1992 and 1996 he was Trade Commissioner in Montreal, part of the Polish Embassy in Ottawa.

Between 1997 and 1998 he served as President of the Polish-American Corporation for Technology Transfer PAKTO S.A. Until 2000 he worked under Jerzy Buzek in the Chancellery of the Prime Minister as an infrastructure advisor, working, among other things, on the agreement securing natural gas supplies from Norway.

Between 2000 and 2002 he served as Vice President of the PGNiG Management Board where he was responsible for trade and restructuring. After this tenure, until 2005 he worked as an independent economic consultant, also serving as Chairman of Ence Eko Sp. z o.o. between 2004 and 2005. In this time he also shared his expertise with the parliamentary committee investigating alleged irregularities at PKN Orlen. Between 2002 and 2006 he served as a member of Warsaw City Council.

Between 31 October 2005 - 7 September 2007 and 11 September 2007 - 16 November 2007 he served as Minister of Economy, acting between those terms as Secretary of State.

From 2009 he served as chairman, and between 2014 and 2015 as Deputy Chairman of the Administrative Board of the Agency for the Cooperation of Energy Regulators (ACER), remaining Member of the Administrative Board until 2017. From 2011 to 2013 he was Deputy Minister of Environment and Chief State Geologist.

On 4 December 2015 he was appointed by the Minister of Treasury as Member of the PGNiG Supervisory Board. On 11 December 2015 he became Acting President of the PGNiG Management Board, with an appointment as President of the PGNiG Management Board following two months later.

== Distinctions ==
In 2018 the President of Poland awarded him Golden Cross of Merit for public service in advancement of energy security.
