= Janusz Tomaszewski =

Polish politician

Minister of the Interior and Administration
- In office 31 October 1997 – 3 September 1999
- Prime Minister: Jerzy Buzek
- Preceded by: Leszek Miller
- Succeeded by: Janusz Pałubicki

Personal details
- Born: 13 September 1956 (age 69) Pabianice, Poland
- Party: Solidarity Electoral Action; Centre Party

Janusz Teofil Tomaszewski (Polish pronunciation: [ˈjanuʂ tɔmaˈʂɛfski]) (born 13 September 1956 in Pabianice) is a Polish politician. A Solidarity activist, member of Solidarity Electoral Action. He was a vice-prime minister and Minister of the Interior and Administration from 31 October 1997 to 3 September 1999. He was forced to resign his official position due to lustration controversy (he was cleared of all suspicions in 2001). In 2004 he joined the Party Centrum.
