= Ministry of Economy and Labour (Poland) =

Former government ministry of Poland

Ministry of Economy and Labour (Polish: Ministerstwo Gospodarki i Pracy) is a Polish abolished government administration office in charge of economy, labor, regional development, tourism.

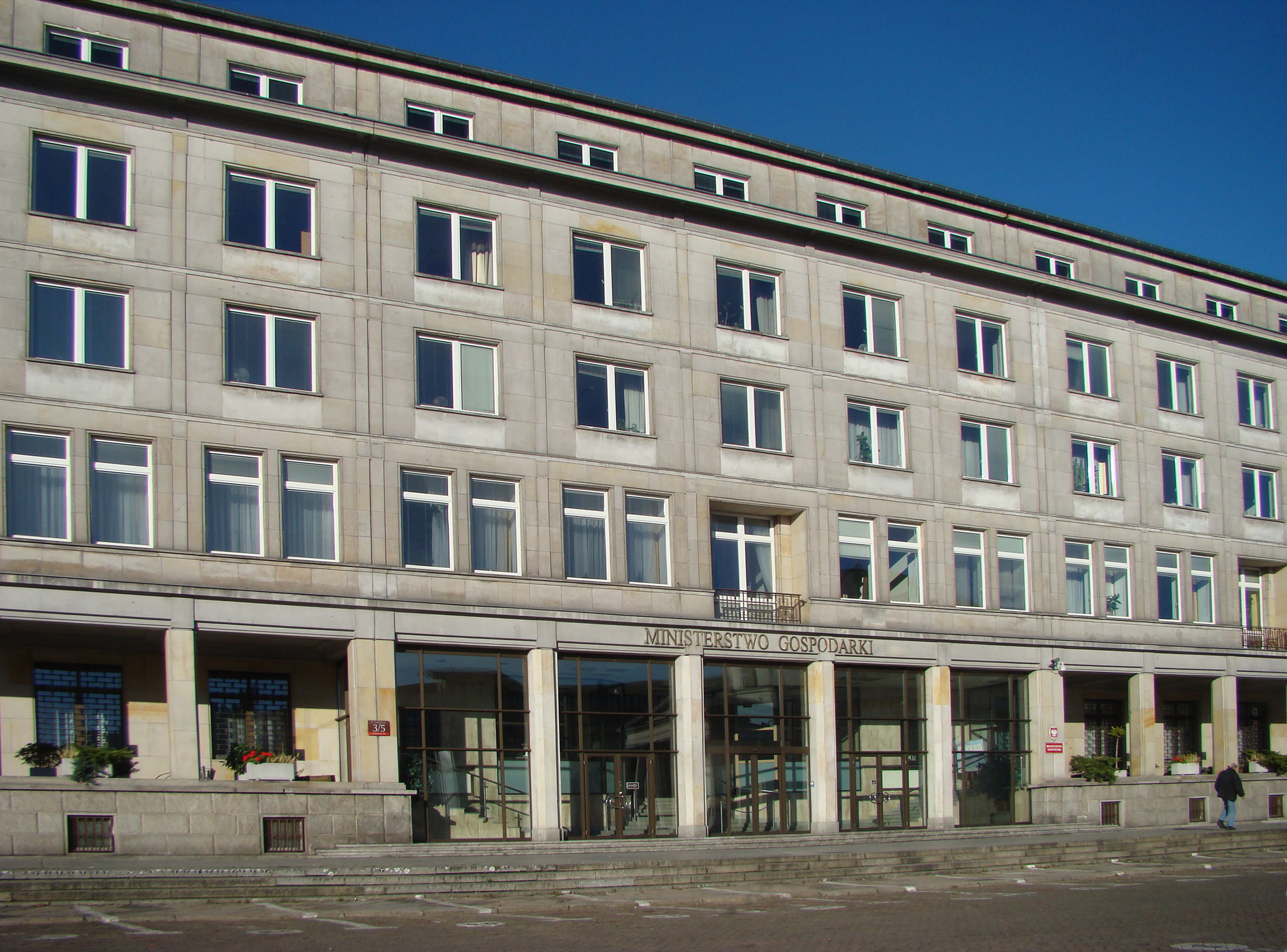
Ministry of Economy of the Republic of Poland

The Ministry was established by the Regulation of the Council of Ministers on 2 May 2004. It was abolished by the regulation of the Council of Ministers in 2005, and organizational units were incorporated into the new Ministry of Economy.

== List of ministers (2004–2005) ==
Photo	Name	Date	
	Jerzy Hausner (SLD)	2 V 2004	31 III 2005
	Jacek Piechota (SLD)	31 III 2005	31 X 2005
