= Janusz Pałubicki =

Polish politician and activist (born 1948)

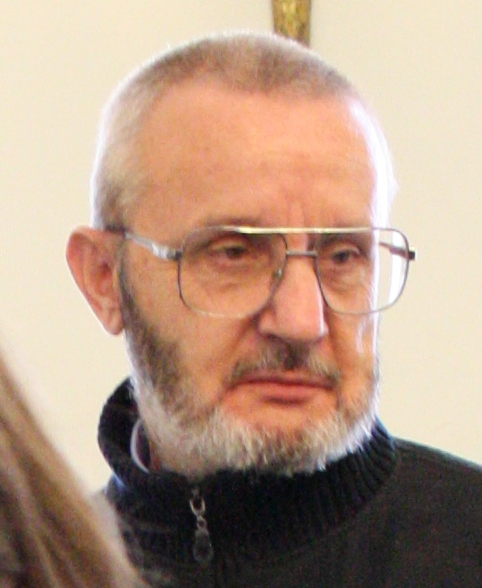
Palubicki Janusz

Janusz Władysław Pałubicki (born 1948) is a Polish politician and activist.

Born in 1948 in Wałbrzych, Pałubicki studied history of art at the University of Poznań. From 1981 he was a member of Solidarity; in 1982 he became the leader of the Wielkopolska part of the movement. During the martial law in Poland (1981–1983) he was one of many Solidarity activists who were arrested and interned. From 1997 to 2001 he was a minister-coordinator of Polish secret services in the Solidarity Electoral Action (AWS) government of Jerzy Buzek. During that period he was also a deputy for Polish parliament, the Sejm.
