= Jacek Piechota =

Polish politician

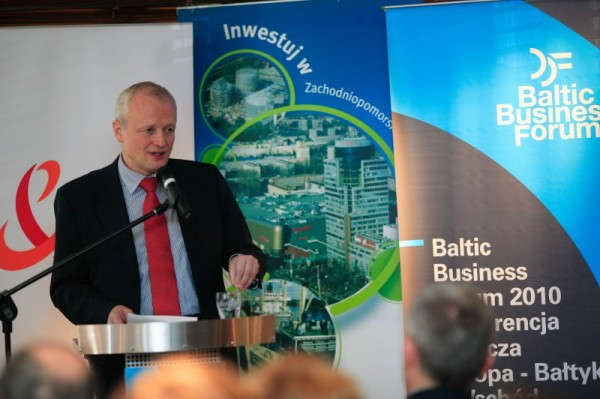

Sejm Member from 41st District (Szczecin)
- In office 6 November 1985 – 4 November 2007

Minister of Economy
- In office 19 October 2001 – 7 January 2003
- President: Aleksander Kwaśniewski
- Prime Minister: Leszek Miller
- Preceded by: Janusz Steinhoff
- Succeeded by: Jerzy Hausner

Ministers of Work and Economy
- In office 31 March 2005 – 31 October 2005
- President: Aleksander Kwaśniewski
- Prime Minister: Marek Belka
- Preceded by: Jerzy Hausner
- Succeeded by: Piotr Woźniak

Personal details
- Born: 28 April 1959 (age 66) Szczecin, People's Republic of Poland
- Party: Democratic Left Alliance
- Spouse: Ewa Piechota
- Profession: Chemist

Jacek Jan Piechota (pronounced [ˈjat͡sɛk pjɛˈxɔta]; born 28 April 1959 in Szczecin) is a Polish left-wing politician. He was the Minister of Economy from 2001 to 2003, under Prime Minister Leszek Miller, and again in 2005 under Prime Minister Marek Belka. Piechota was elected to the Sejm on 25 September 2005, receiving 17257 votes in 41 Szczecin district as a candidate on the Democratic Left Alliance list. He was also a member of the Polish United Workers' Party from 1978 to 1990.

He was also a member of PRL Sejm 1985-1989, PRL Sejm 1989-1991, Sejm 1991-1993, Sejm 1993-1997, Sejm 1997-2001, and Sejm 2001-2005.

== Biography ==
In 1983, Jacek Jan Piechota graduated from a magistracy at the Faculty of Chemical Technology and Engineering of Szczecin Polytechnic University, having received a degree in chemical engineer.

In 1984-1985 he worked as a chemistry teacher in the VI secondary lyceum in Szczecin.

In 1978, he joined the Polish Joint Work Party. After its dissolution, by 1999 he belonged to the Social Democracy of the Republic of Poland.

From 19 November 2001 to 7 January 2003 he served as the Minister of Economy in the Government of Miller Leszek.

Jacek Jan Piechota was a member of the election committee of Vlodzimezh Tsimoshevych in the 2005 presidential election. In 2006, with the support of the election committee of the Left and Democrats, balloted to the post of the President of Szczecin.

== Honors ==
- Bronze Merit Cross (1988)
- Medal of National Education Commission (1989)
- Order of the White Star I class (Estonia, 2002)
- Order "for the benefit of the republic"
- Order "For Merits" of the III degree (Ukraine, August 24, 2013)

== See also ==
- Members of Polish Sejm 2005-2007
