= Ministry of Economy, Labour and Social Policy (Poland) =

Former government ministry of Poland

Ministry of Economy, Labour and Social Policy is a Polish abolished government administration office serving the minister in charge of economy, labor, regional development, tourism, social security.

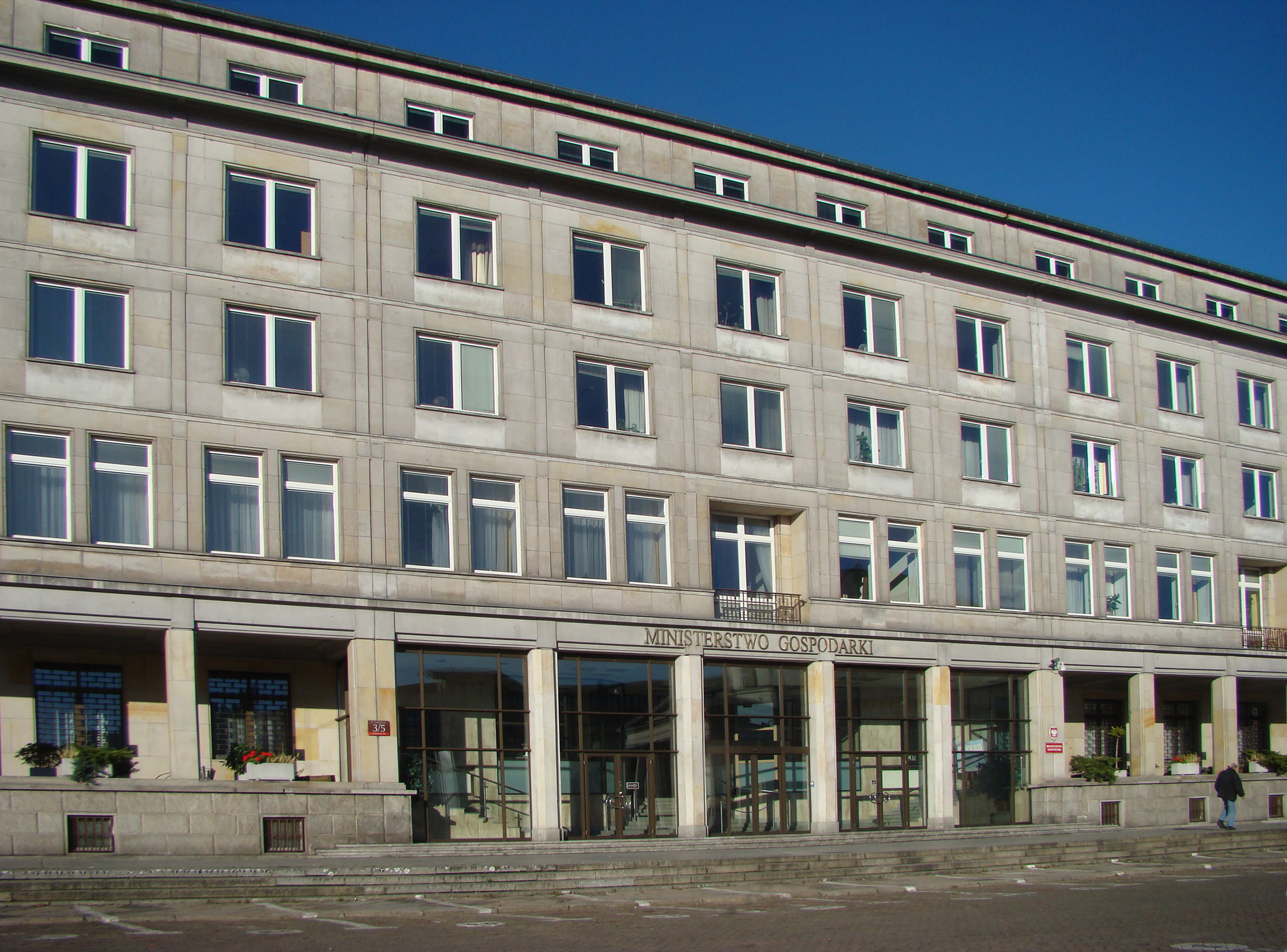
Ministry of Economy of the Republic of Poland

The Ministry was established by the decree of the Council of Ministers of 7 January 2003. It was abolished on 2 May 2004, and the organizational units were incorporated into the new Ministry of Economy and Labour. The only minister was Jerzy Hausner (SLD).
