= Ministry of State Treasury (Poland) =

- Ministerstwo Skarbu Państwa

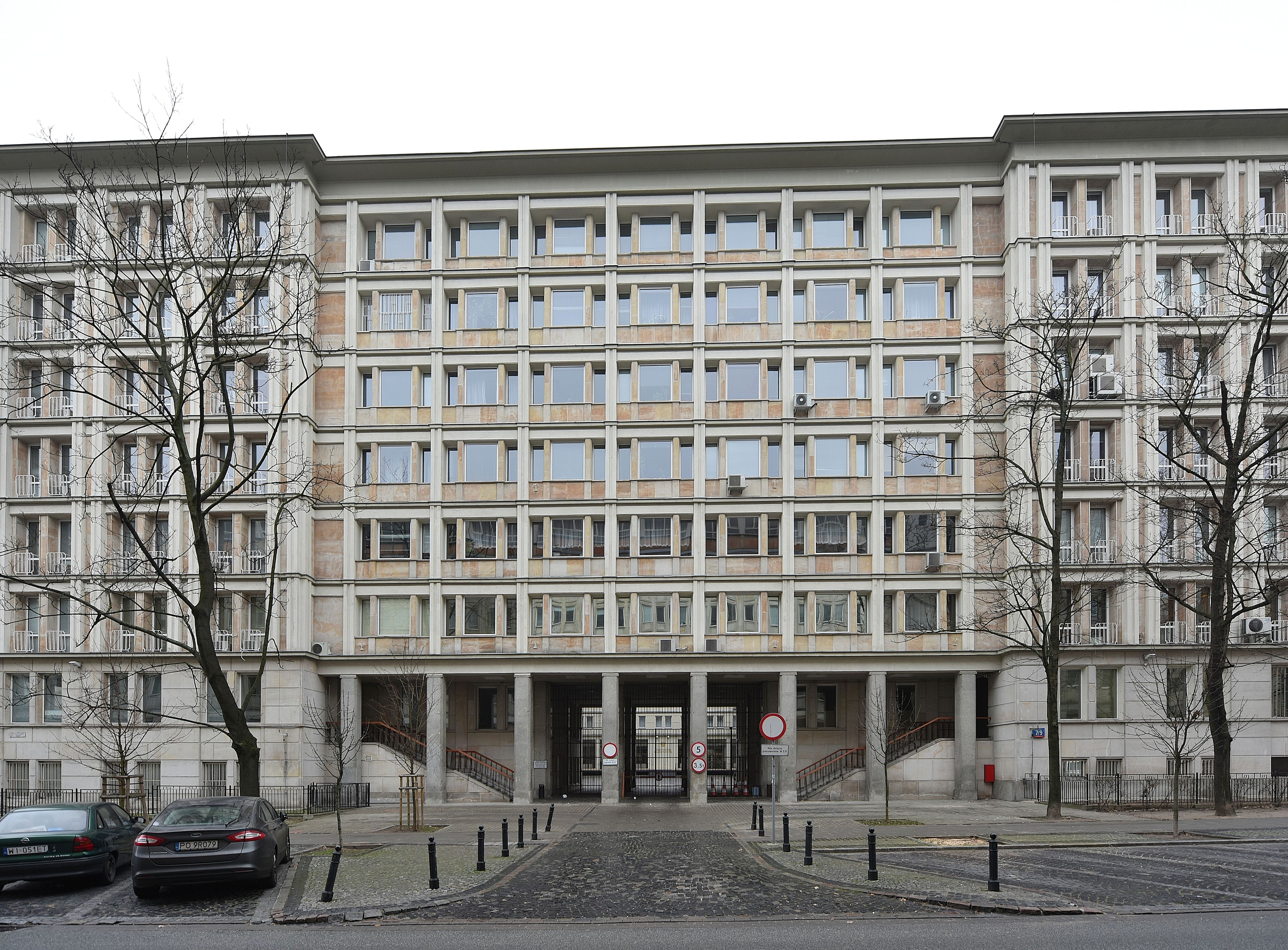

Agency overview
- Formed: 1996
- Dissolved: 2017
- Headquarters: ul. Krucza 36 / ul. Wspólna 6,, Warsaw
- Agency executive: Dawid Jackiewicz, Minister of State Treasury
- Parent agency: Council of Ministers
- Website: www.msp.gov.pl

Ministry of State Treasury of the Republic of Poland (or just Ministry of (the) Treasury according to its own English webpage) was formed to administer issues related to State Treasury of Poland. The formation of the ministry occurred in 1996 during the Polish administrative reform of 1996. It was dissolved in 2017.

The ministry traces its history the Ministry of Ownership Transformation (Ministerstwo Przekształceń Własnościowych), established around 1990 to oversee privatization of the economy of Poland, which before 1990 was significantly controlled and owned by the communist government of the People's Republic of Poland. In modern Poland, the Ministry of State Treasury of the Republic of Poland is separate from the Ministry of Finance of the Republic of Poland. However, until 1950, the modern Polish Ministry of Finance functioned under the name of the Ministry of State Treasury. In 1950, the Ministry of State Treasury was liquidated and a new Ministry of Finance was created. In 1996 the Ministry of State Treasury was recreated, in a limited scope compared to its old namesake, and now exists alongside of the Ministry of Finance.

The last minister was Dawid Jackiewicz.

== See also ==
- Ministry of Economy
- Ministry of Finance
- Polish Development Fund
