= Marek Belka =

50th Prime minister of Poland from 2004 to 2005

His Excellency Marek Belka MEP
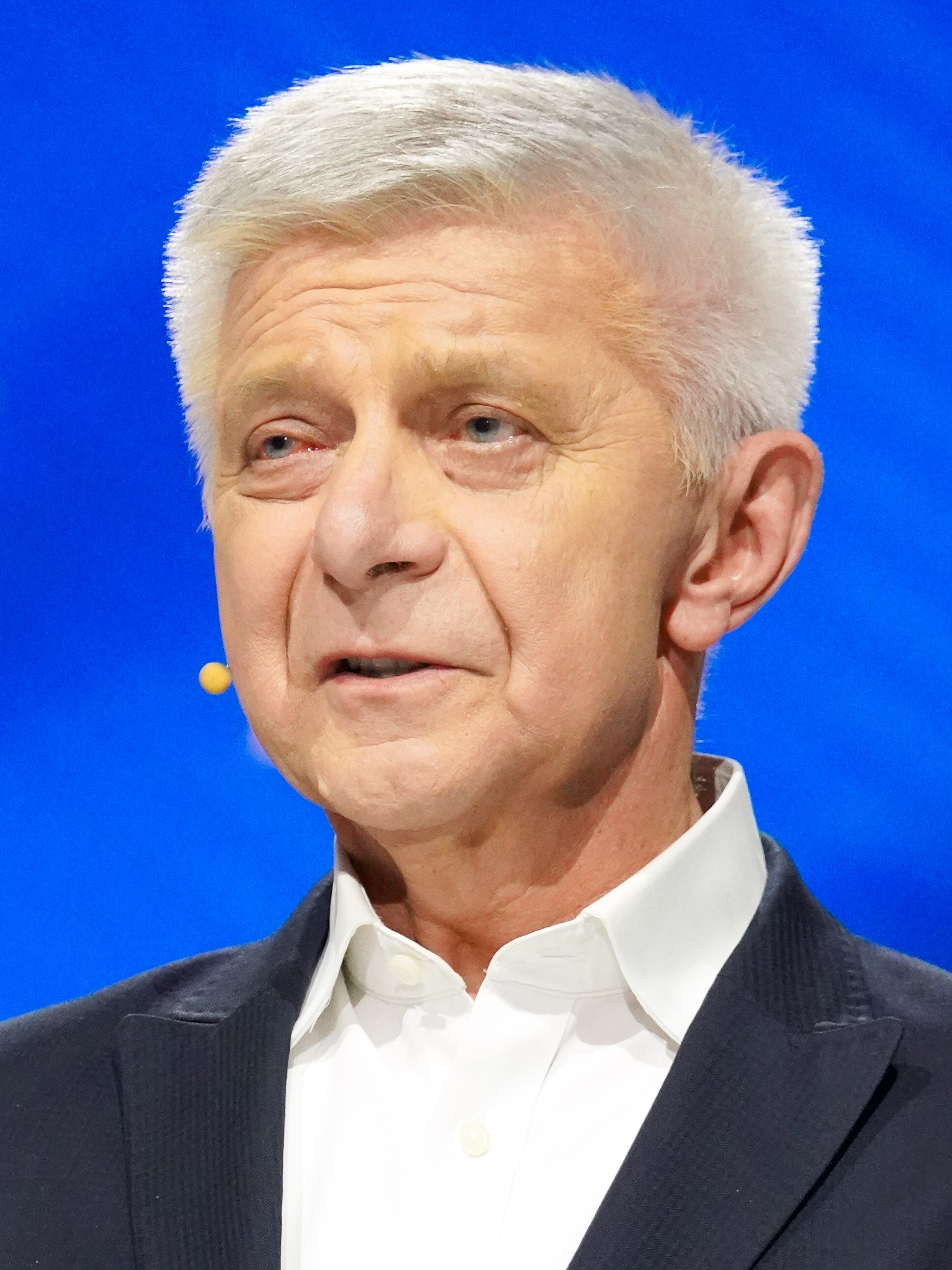
- Belka in 2024

Prime Minister of Poland
- In office 2 May 2004 – 31 October 2005
- President: Aleksander Kwaśniewski
- Deputy: Jerzy Hausner; Izabela Jaruga-Nowacka
- Preceded by: Leszek Miller
- Succeeded by: Kazimierz Marcinkiewicz

President of the National Bank of Poland
- In office 11 June 2010 – 20 June 2016
- Appointed by: Bronisław Komorowski
- Preceded by: Piotr Wiesiołek (Acting)
- Succeeded by: Adam Glapiński

Member of the European Parliament
- In office 1 July 2019 – 15 July 2024
- Constituency: Łódź

Deputy Prime Minister of Poland
- In office 19 October 2001 – 6 July 2002
- Prime Minister: Leszek Miller
- In office 4 February 1997 – 17 October 1997
- Prime Minister: Włodzimierz Cimoszewicz

Minister of Finance
- In office 19 October 2001 – 6 July 2002
- Prime Minister: Leszek Miller
- Preceded by: Halina Wasilewska-Trenker
- Succeeded by: Grzegorz Kołodko
- In office 4 February 1997 – 17 October 1997
- Prime Minister: Włodzimierz Cimoszewicz
- Preceded by: Grzegorz Kołodko
- Succeeded by: Leszek Balcerowicz

Personal details
- Born: Marek Marian Belka; 9 January 1952 (age 74) Łódź, Poland
- Party: Polish United Workers' Party (1973–1990); Democratic Left Alliance (1999–2005); Independent (1990–1999, 2005–present)
- Other political affiliations: Progressive Alliance of Socialists and Democrats (Since 2019); The Left (Since 2019)
- Spouse: Krystyna Belka
- Children: 2
- Education: University of Łódź
- Awards: Order of the Lithuanian Grand Duke Gediminas Bene Merito (Poland)

Marek Marian Belka (Note: Polish pronunciation: [ˈmarɛk ˈbɛlka]) (born 9 January 1952) is a Polish economist and politician who served as the prime minister and finance minister of Poland in two governments. He is a former director of the International Monetary Fund's (IMF) European Department and former head of the National Bank of Poland. He served as a member of the European Parliament (MEP) from 2019 to 2024.

He has published over 100 scientific papers devoted mainly to money theory and anti-inflation policy in developing countries. He specializes in applied economics and contemporary economic thought. He is also a member of the Committee of Economic Sciences of the Polish Academy of Sciences.

He held a number of important public functions in Poland and abroad. In 1990 he became an advisor and consultant at the ministry of finance, followed by the ministry of ownership transformations and the Central Planning Office. In 1994–1996 he was the vice-chairman of the Council of Socio-Economic Strategy at the Council of Ministers, and then economic advisor to the president of Poland Aleksander Kwaśniewski. In 1996 he became a consultant at the World Bank. He was twice the deputy prime minister of Poland and the finance minister: in 1997 in the cabinet of Włodzimierz Cimoszewicz and in 2001–2002 in the cabinet of Leszek Miller. In 2004–2005 he served as the prime minister and the chairman of the Committee for European Integration. In 2005 he was the minister of sport in his own government. He served as the president of the National Bank of Poland in 2011–2016, and in the same period was a member of the steering committee of the European Systemic Risk Board.

He was also the head of the coalition Council for International Coordination in Iraq (2003), and then the director of economic policy in the Coalition Provisional Authority (2003–2004), where he was responsible for currency reform, creation of a new banking system and supervision of the economy. From 2006 he served as the executive secretary of the UN Economic Commission for Europe (UNECE), and from November 2008 as the director of the European Department of International Monetary Fund.

Belka was elected an MEP at the 2019 European Parliament election. He was the vice-president of the S&D Group during the 2019–2024 term.

He is a member of The Trilateral Commission.

== Early life and education ==
Belka graduated from the Socio-Economic Department of the University of Łódź in 1972 and holds a Master's degree in economics of foreign trade and a PhD in economics from that university; his thesis was on US anti-inflationary policy. He became a professor in 1994. In 1978–1979 and 1985–1986 he did scientific internships at Columbia University and the University of Chicago, and in 1990 at London School of Economics. From 1986, he was associated with the Institute of Economics of the Polish Academy of Sciences.

== Early career ==
From 1990 until 1996 Belka worked as a consultant for the Ministry of Finance of the Republic of Poland and the World Bank. He served as Deputy Prime Minister and Minister of Finance in 1997 and from 2001 to 2002; and as an economic consultant of the President of the Republic of Poland in the meantime. He also served as Adviser to the three successive Prime Ministers of Albania – Fatos Nano, Pandeli Majko and Ilir Meta – from 1997 to 2001.

Later, Belka worked as an advisor to JP Morgan for Central and Eastern Europe from 2002 to 2003. In 2003 he was responsible for economic policy in the interim Coalition Provisional Authority of Iraq.

== Political career ==
=== Career in national politics ===
Belka was active in the Polish Students' Association and the Polish Socialist Youth Union. From 1973 to 1990 he was a member of the Polish United Workers' Party. In the 1980s he was the first secretary of the Polish United Workers' Party at the University of Łódź.

Belka was designated prime minister of Poland by president Aleksander Kwaśniewski on 29 May 2004 and sworn into office the next 8 August. He failed to receive the required parliamentary support on 14 August, but on 11 September he was designated again. On 24 October he finally managed to receive enough support in the Sejm, winning a vote of confidence by a majority of 235 votes to 215.

Belka joined the new liberal Democratic Party - demokraci.pl in May 2005, but failed to win a seat in Łódź in the 2005 elections. Also in 2005, he was a candidate for the post of OECD Secretary General, but lost to José Ángel Gurría.

=== Career in international organizations ===
From 2006 to 2008, Belka served as Executive Secretary of the UN Economic Commission for Europe (UNECE).

In 2007, Belka was proposed by Poland as managing director of the International Monetary Fund (IMF), but the European Union (EU) finally decided to advance former French minister Dominique Strauss-Kahn's candidacy.

On 15 July 2008, Strauss-Kahn named Belka as Director of the IMF's European Department, a position Belka took up on 1 November 2008. In this capacity, he led the fund's response to the global economic crisis in Europe.

=== President of the National Bank of Poland, 2010–2016 ===
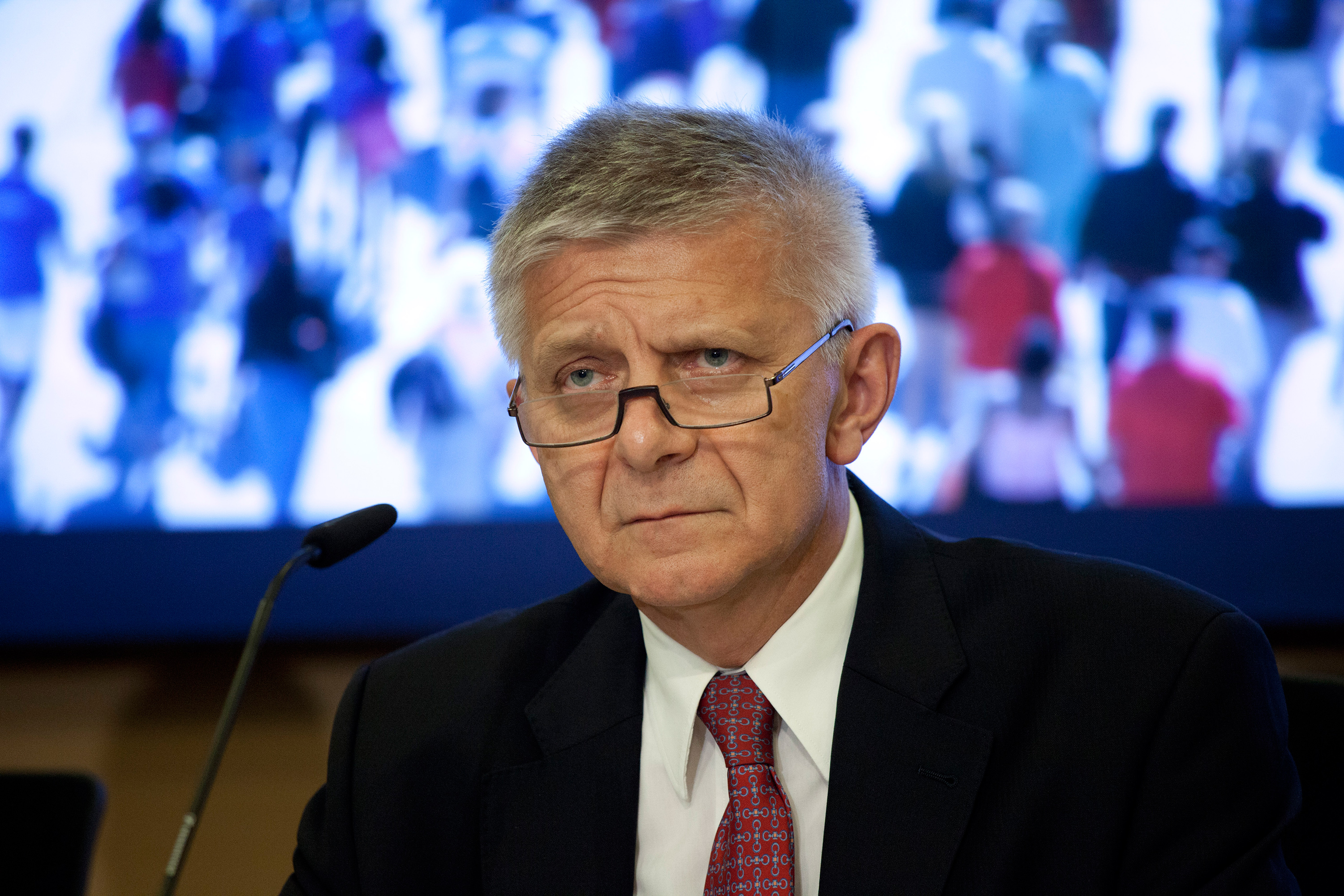
Marek Belka during press conference after MPC decision-making meeting, 2013

On 27 May 2010 Belka was nominated as the next head of the National Bank of Poland by acting president of Poland Bronisław Komorowski. On 10 June 2010, his nomination was approved by the parliament (253 votes in favor; 184 against). His term ended on 21 June 2016.

In June 2014, the Polish magazine Wprost published a series of transcripts of secret recordings involving senior Polish government officials, including one in which Belka discussed the forthcoming 2015 election with the interior minister Bartłomiej Sienkiewicz. Belka said he would not resign over the remarks he is alleged to have made. The secret recordings were believed to have been made in one or more restaurants in the capital, Warsaw, and thought to date back as far as Summer 2013.

In 2016, news media reported that Belka was considering taking up the role of the head of the European Bank for Reconstruction and Development (EBRD). He was also a member of the Eminent Persons Group on Global Financial Governance, which was established by the G20 Finance Ministers and Central Bank Governors for the period from 2017 to 2018.

=== Member of the European Parliament, 2019-2024 ===
In the 2019 European Parliament election Belka was elected as an MEP for the Łódź constituency from the European Coalition list. In Parliament, he served on the Committee on Economic and Monetary Affairs and the Subcommittee on Tax Matters.

In addition to his committee assignments, Belka was a member of the delegation for relations with the United States and of the URBAN Intergroup. In elections to the European Parliament in 2024 he ran from the first place on the Left list in the Łódź constituency but failed to win re-election.

== Later career ==
In 2025, the European Commission appointed Belka as chair of its Ukraine Facility’s audit board.

== Other activities ==
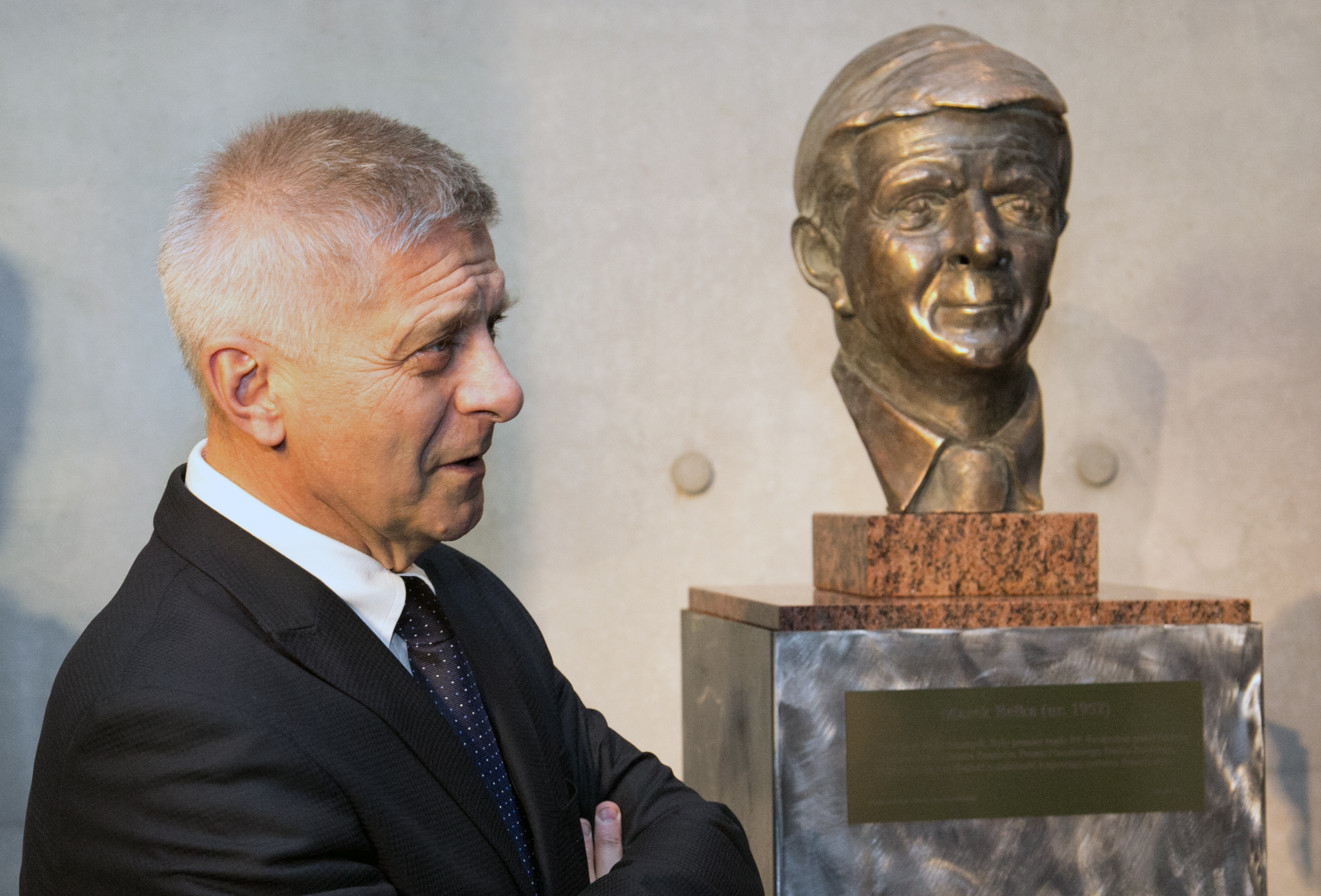
Unveiling a bronze sculpture (Galeria Chwały Polskiej Ekonomii) by himself, Warsaw Stock Exchange, March 2014

=== International organizations ===
- European Investment Bank (EIB), Member of the Appointment Advisory Committee (since 2017)
- European Systemic Risk Board (ESRB), Member of the Steering Committee (2011-2016)
- European Bank for Reconstruction and Development (EBRD), Ex-Officio Member of the Board of Governors (2010-2016)
- Joint World Bank-IMF Development Committee, Chairman (2011-2015)
- European Bank Coordination Initiative (EBCI, Vienna Initiative 2), Chairman of the Steering Committee (2013-2016)

=== Corporate boards ===
- Echo Polska Properties, Independent Member of the Board of Directors (since 2016)
- Bank Millennium, Member of the Supervisory Board (2002-2004)
- LOT Polish Airlines, Chairman of the Board of Directors (2002-2003)

=== Non-profit organizations ===
- Berggruen Institute, Member of the Council for the Future of Europe
- Museum Berggruen, Member of the International Council
- Trilateral Commission, Member of the European Group
- Polish-American Freedom Foundation, Member of the Board of Directors (2000-2010)

== Recognition ==
Belka received an Honorary Doctorate from Heriot-Watt University in 2006.

Belka is an Honorary Member of the International Raoul Wallenberg Foundation. In October 2013 he was elected into the Polish Economy Hall of Fame.

== Personal life ==
Belka is married and has two children. The family lives in Łódź.

Political offices
Preceded by Grzegorz Kołodko	Minister of Finance; 1997	Succeeded by Leszek Balcerowicz
Preceded by Halina Wasilewska-Trenkner	Minister of Finance; 2001–2002	Succeeded by Grzegorz Kołodko
Preceded by Leszek Miller	Prime Minister of Poland; 2004–2005	Succeeded by Kazimierz Marcinkiewicz
Government offices
Preceded by Piotr Wiesiołek; Acting	President of the National Bank; 2010–2016	Succeeded by Adam Glapiński
