= Jerzy Hausner =

Polish politician and economist

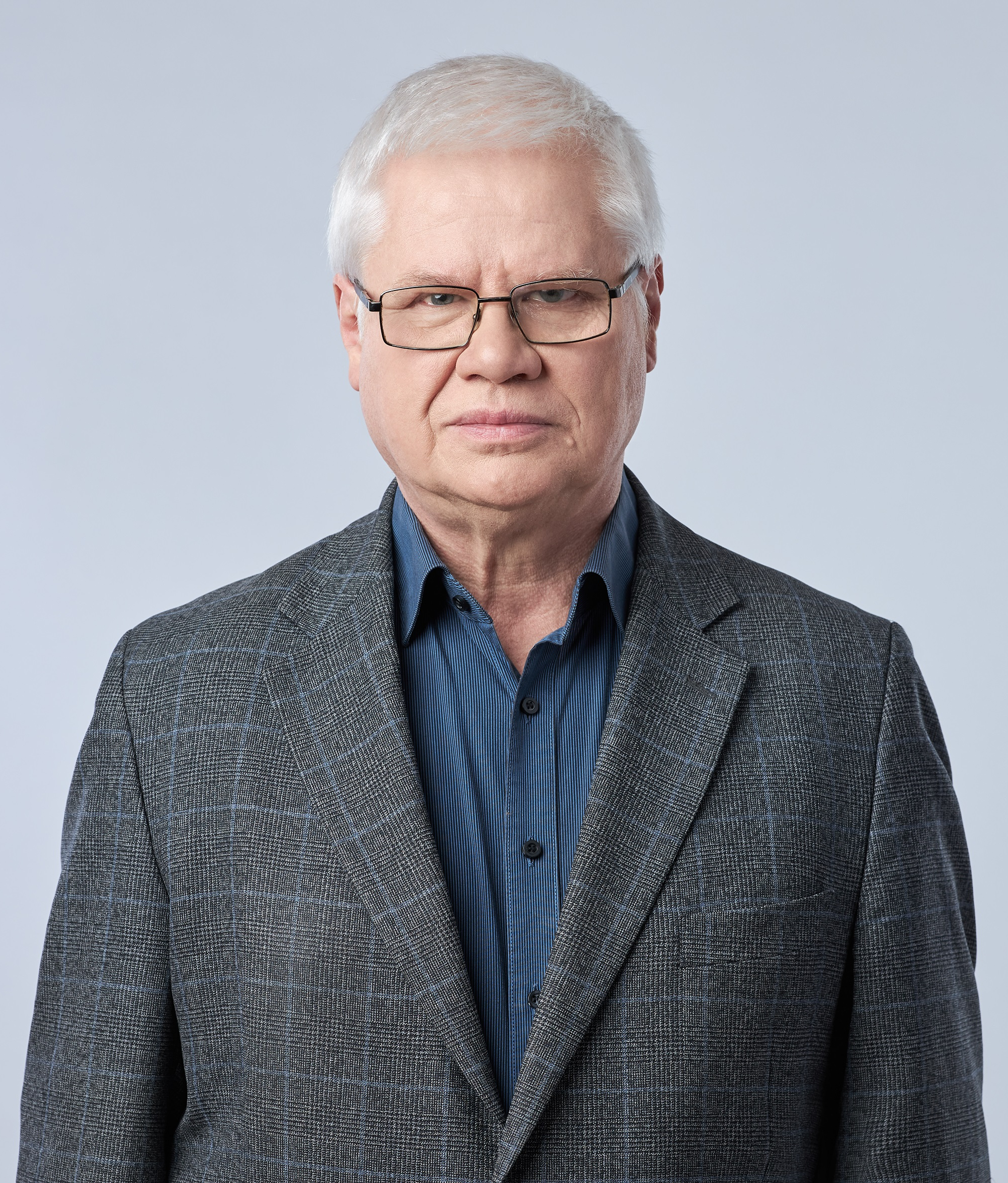

Deputy Prime Minister of Poland
- In office 16 June 2003 – 31 March 2005
- President: Aleksander Kwaśniewski
- Prime Minister: Leszek Miller; Marek Belka
- Preceded by: Grzegorz Kołodko
- Succeeded by: Ludwik Dorn; Zyta Gilowska; Roman Giertych; Andrzej Lepper

Minister of Labour and Social Policy
- In office 19 October 2001 – 7 January 2003
- Preceded by: Longin Komołowski
- Succeeded by: Krzysztof Michalkiewicz

Member of the Fourth Sejm
- In office 19 October 2001 – 18 October 2005
- Preceded by: Jacek Piechota
- Succeeded by: Jacek Piechota

Personal details
- Born: 6 October 1949 (age 76) Świnoujście, Poland
- Party: Democratic Party – demokraci.pl
- Spouse: Maria Hausner
- Children: two daughters
- Education: Kraków University of Economics

Jerzy Krzysztof Hausner (born 6 October 1949) is a Polish politician and economist. He was a Member of the 4th Sejm (Parliament) of the Republic of Poland.

== Life ==
Jerzy Hausner has graduated from Kraków University of Economics. From 1994 to 1996 he served as Director-General of the Prime Minister's Office. In that capacity, he was in charge of a group of advisers to Grzegorz Kolodko - then the Deputy Prime Minister responsible for the economy. He coordinated preparatory work for, and worked to implement, the "Strategy for Poland" - at the time the key government program of economic and social development of the country. He also the outline for the "Compact for Silesia", a program of economic renewal for the region. He served as commissioner further and helped the Government Center for Strategic Studies. In February 1997, in the Government of Prime Minister Wlodzimierz Cimoszewicz, he was appointed Undersecretary of State at the Prime Minister's Chancery and Government's Commissioner for Social Security Reform. He was charged with developing an implementation timetable for social security reform, the operational establishing principles of pension funds, as well as with an ex-ante evaluation of the implementation costs of the new social security system, and with designing a financing scheme.

He served as:

- Former Minister of Labour and Social Policy (2001–2003)
- Minister of State Treasury (2004)
- Minister of Health (2004)
- Minister of Economy (2003–2005)
- Deputy Prime Minister (2004)
- Professor of Kraków University of Economics
- member of the Monetary Policy Council (2010–2016)

In his research, he is interested in the interaction of economy and politics (political economy, public economy and public administration.) He has authored 231 publications, 48 books, 58 journal articles, and 38 chapters in books. He holds membership in the Polish Economic Association, the Scientific Association of Organization and Management, and the European Association for Evolutionary Political Economy.

In 1996 he was awarded with Knight's Cross of the Order of Polonia Restituta.

Jerzy Hausner is married to Maria Hausner with two daughters. He is nephew to Krzysztof Hausner, Polish football player.
