= Jerzy Buzek =

Prime Minister of Poland from 1997 to 2001

His Excellency Jerzy Buzek MEP
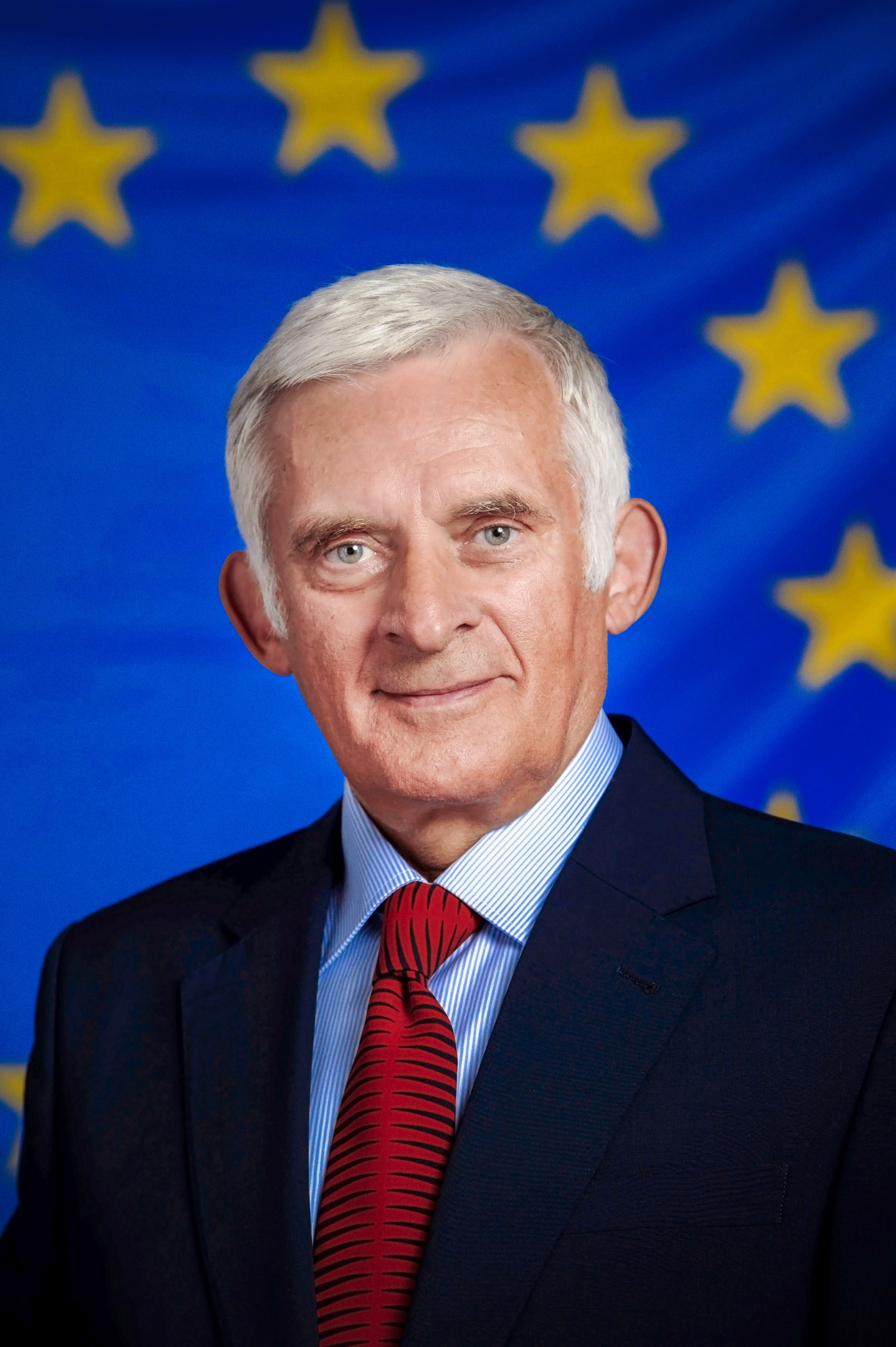
- Official portrait, 2009

President of the European Parliament
- In office 14 July 2009 – 17 January 2012
- Deputy: See list: Giovanni Pittella; Rodi Kratsa-Tsagaropoulou; Stavros Lambrinidis; Miguel Angel Martínez Martínez; Alejo Vidal-Quadras; Dagmar Roth-Behrendt; Libor Rouček; Isabelle Durant; Roberta Angelilli; Diana Wallis; Pál Schmitt; Edward McMillan-Scott; Rainer Wieland; Silvana Koch-Mehrin
- Preceded by: Hans-Gert Pöttering
- Succeeded by: Martin Schulz

Prime Minister of Poland
- In office 31 October 1997 – 19 October 2001
- President: Aleksander Kwaśniewski
- Deputy: See list: Longin Komołowski; Leszek Balcerowicz; Janusz Tomaszewski; Janusz Steinhoff
- Preceded by: Włodzimierz Cimoszewicz
- Succeeded by: Leszek Miller
Parliamentary offices
Member of the European Parliament
for Poland
In office
20 July 2004 – 1 July 2024
Member of the Sejm
for Warsaw I
In office
21 October 1997 – 18 October 2001

Personal details
- Born: Jerzy Karol Buzek; 3 July 1940 (age 86) Smilowitz, Nazi Germany (now Czech Republic)
- Party: Civic Platform
- Other political affiliations: European People's Party Solidarity Electoral Action (1996–2001)
- Spouse: Ludgarda Buzek
- Children: Agata
- Education: Silesian University of Technology
- Awards: Order of the White Eagle (Poland) Order of Merit of the Republic of Hungary Order of the Cross of Terra Mariana Order of Isabella the Catholic

Jerzy Karol Buzek (Note: Polish pronunciation: [ˈjɛʐɨ ˈbuzɛk]) (born 3 July 1940) is a Polish politician who served as Prime Minister of Poland from 1997 to 2001. Since being elected to the European Parliament in 2004, he served as President of the European Parliament between 2009 and 2012. He is married to Ludgarda Buzek and is the father of Polish actress Agata Buzek.

== Early years ==
Jerzy Karol Buzek was born to a Lutheran family on 3 July 1940 in Smilovice, Czechoslovakia (at the time part of Nazi Germany and called Smilowitz). He was born into the prominent Buzek family, which participated in Polish politics in the Second Polish Republic during the interbellum. The family was part of the Polish community in the Trans-Olza region. Buzek's father was an engineer. After the Second World War, his family moved to Chorzów. He is a Lutheran.

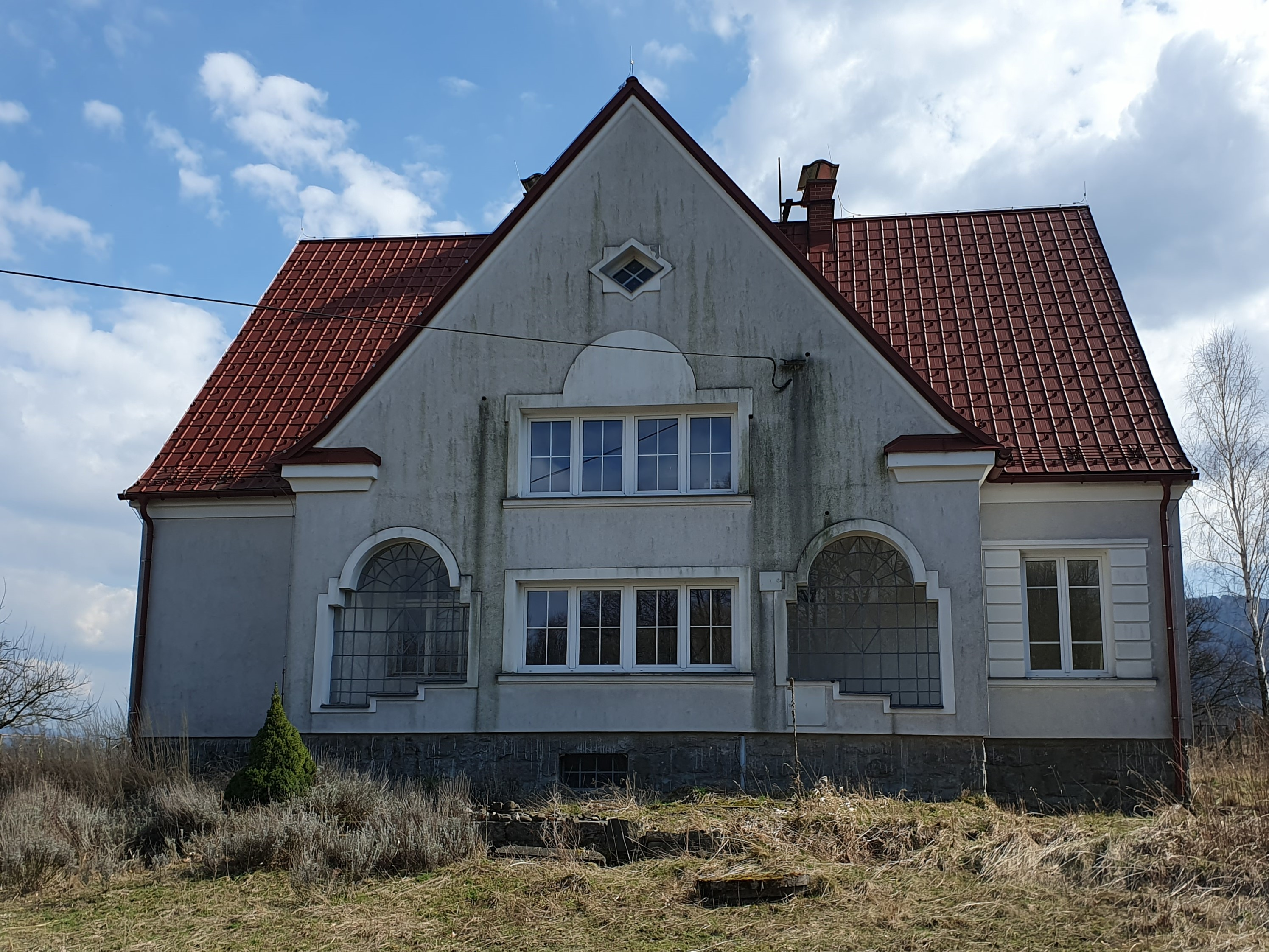
Buzek's birth house

== Professional career ==
In 1963 Jerzy Buzek graduated from the Mechanics-and-Energy Division of the Silesian University of Technology, specialising in chemical engineering. He became a scientist in the Chemical Engineering Institute of the Polish Academy of Sciences. Since 1997 he has been a professor of technical science. He is also an honorary doctor of the universities in Seoul and Dortmund among others.

From 1997 to 2001, Buzek was a coalition Prime Minister of Poland.

In 1998 he became the first laureate of the Grzegorz Palka Award and was nominated European of the Year by the European Union Business Chambers Forum.

In 1998 he was named 'Person of the Year' by the influential Polish political weekly Wprost. He won the award for the second time in 2009. On receiving the award again, as President of the European Parliament, he stressed that he was the first winner to be honoured for his work beyond the borders of Poland.

He was the first Prime Minister of the 3rd Republic of Poland to serve a full term.Jerzy Buzek was the first Lutheran Prime Minister in the history of Poland.

After losing the parliamentary elections in 2001, he stepped back from political life and focused more on his scientific work, becoming the prorector of Akademia Polonijna in Częstochowa and professor in the Faculty of Mechanical Engineering of the Opole University of Technology in Opole.

His return to political life in 2004 saw him gain the largest popular vote in Poland as the member for Katowice to the European Parliament standing for the Civic Platform.

Whilst President of the European Parliament, on 30 March 2011, he was awarded an honorary fellowship of the Institution of Chemical Engineers at a meeting of the European Federation of Chemical Engineering (EFCE) in Brussels, Belgium.

== Political career ==
In the 1980s, Buzek was an activist of the anti-communist movements, including the legal (1980–1981 and since 1989) and underground (1981–1989) Solidarity trade union and political movement in communist Poland. He was an active organiser of the trade union's regional and national underground authorities. He was also the chairman of the four national general meetings (1st, 4th, 5th, and 6th) when the Solidarity movement was allowed to participate in the political process again.

Jerzy Buzek was a member of the Solidarity Electoral Action (AWS) and co-author of the AWS's economic program. After the 1997 elections he was elected to the Sejm, the lower house of the Polish Parliament, and was soon appointed Prime Minister of Poland. In 1999 he became the chairman of the AWS Social Movement (Ruch Społeczny AWS) and in 2001 he became the Chairman of the Solidarity Electoral Action coalition.

=== Jerzy Buzek's government ===
Between the years 1997–2001 he was the Prime Minister of Poland, first of the centre-right AWS–Freedom Union coalition government until 2001, and then of the right-wing AWS minority government. His cabinet's major achievements were four significant political and economic reforms: a new local government and administration division of Poland, reform of the pension system, reform of the educational system, and reform of the medical care system. AWS was defeated in the 2001 Polish parliamentary election. Buzek resigned as the chairman of AWS Social Movement and was replaced by Mieczysław Janowski.

=== Polish Member of the European Parliament ===
On 13 June 2004, in the European Parliament election, 2004, Jerzy Buzek was elected a Member of the European Parliament (MEP) from the Silesian Voivodeship, basing his candidacy only on the popularity of his name and on direct contact with the voters. He received a record number of votes, 173,389 (22.14% of the total votes in the region). His current party affiliation is with the Civic Platform, which is a member of the European People's Party.

In the 2004–2009 European Parliament, he was a member of the Committee on Industry, Research and Energy, an alternate member of the Committee on the Environment, Public Health and Food Safety, a member of the Delegation to the EU–Ukraine Parliamentary Cooperation Committee, and an alternate delegate for the delegation for relations with the countries of Central America. He served as rapporteur on the EU's 7th Framework Programme for Research and Development, a multibillion-euro spending program for the years 2007–2013.

On 7 June 2009, in the European Parliament election, 2009, Buzek was re-elected as a Member of the European Parliament from the Silesian Voivodeship constituency. Just as in the previous election, Buzek received a record number of votes in Poland: 393,117 (over 42% of the total votes in the district). On 12 September 2018, he voted in favor of approving the controversial Directive on Copyright in the Digital Single Market.

In the 2014–2019 European Parliament he was the Chair of the Committee on Industry, Research and Energy, responsible for industrial policy, EU research and innovation policy, space policy, energy policy and the application of new technologies. In the 2014–2019 European Parliament he remained a regular member of the Committee.

=== President of the European Parliament ===
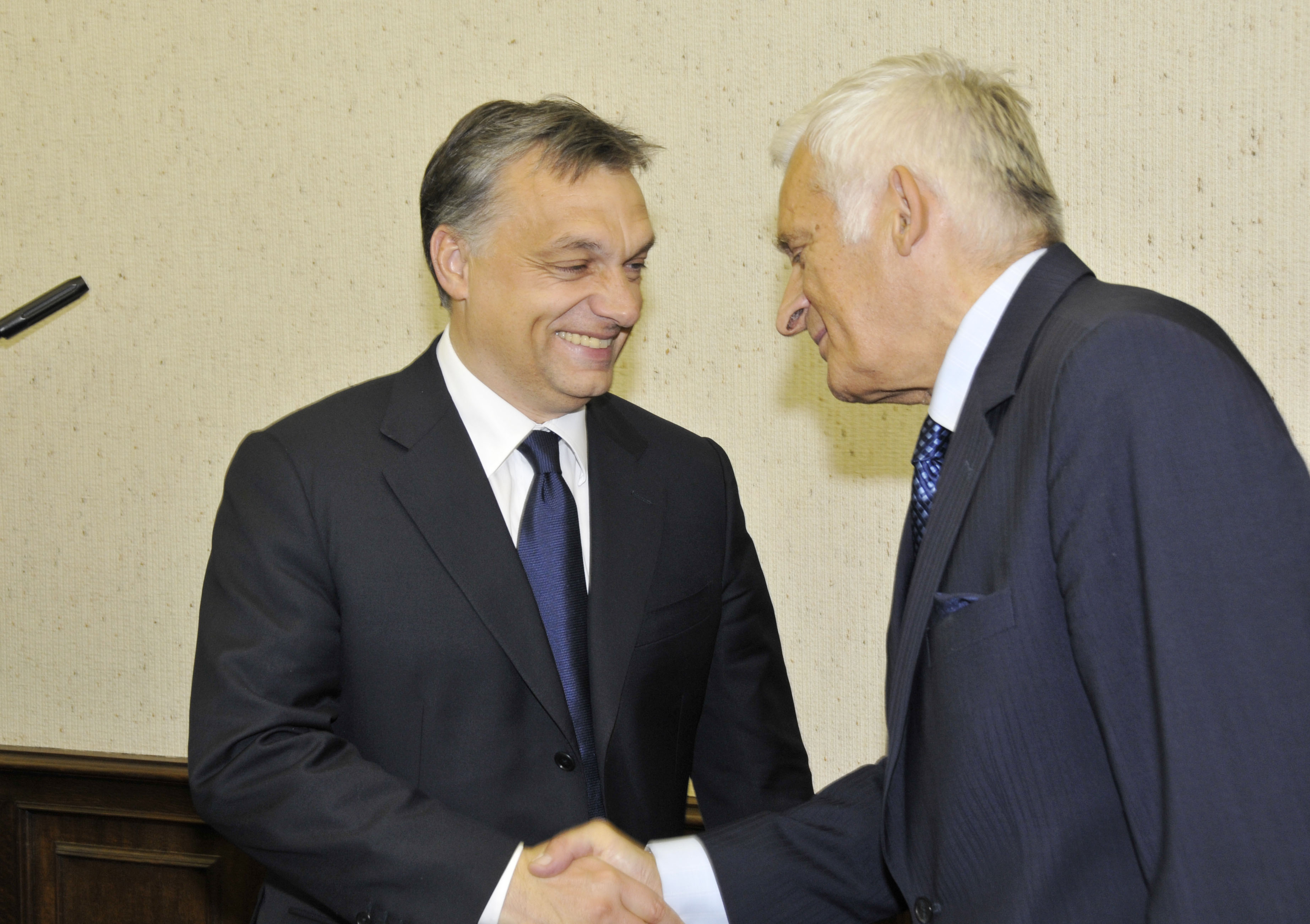
Jerzy Buzek with Viktor Orbán, at an EPP summit in September 2010

On 14 July 2009, Buzek was elected President of the European Parliament with 555 votes of the 644 votes cast, the largest majority ever, becoming the first person from the former Eastern Bloc and the first former Prime Minister since Pierre Pflimlin to gain that position. He succeeded the German Christian Democrat MEP, Hans-Gert Pöttering. He pledged to make human rights and the promotion of the Eastern partnership two of his priorities during his term of office, which would last two and a half years, due to a political deal, Social Democrat MEP Martin Schulz who take over after that.

In his inaugural address in Strasbourg, Buzek stated that among the greatest challenges faced by the European parliament were the economic crisis, European solidarity, human rights, and reform within the Parliament itself. Buzek also stated he would be committed to reform of the European economy, tackling rising unemployment, energy security, and climate change, strengthening European solidarity and integration and promoting equal opportunities for women. However, Buzek noted that the Lisbon Treaty would be a prerequisite to any change "(so that the Union can be) well-organised and effective".

On 8 December 2009 Buzek was awarded by the Ministerpräsident of North Rhine-Westphalia, Dr. Jürgen Rüttgers, the annual "Staatspreis award". The prize was awarded in honor of his lifetime achievements and highlighted the European Parliament as a "motor of integration." Affirming his commitment to the Eastern Partnership and "those who do not have the possibility to participate in our European integration project", Buzek announced that the prize money would be donated to the European Humanities University (EHU), A Belarusian university in exile in Vilnius.

The Lisbon Treaty, which came into force on 1 December 2009 shortly after Buzek assumed office, brought a conclusion to nearly a decade of internal discussions and greatly boosted the democratic powers of the European Parliament. From very early on Buzek has been a vocal supporter of the treaty as part of a wider push for greater political integration in Europe. The rise in legislative powers under the treaty in fact represents almost a doubling in power. Since its introduction Parliament has equal rights with the Council of Ministers over 40 new fields within the "co-decision" procedure, such as agriculture, energy security, immigration, justice and home affairs, health and structural funds.

In late 2011 Buzek's presidency also endorsed the 'Sixpack' legislation on economic governance to tackle the growing Eurozone crisis. This was a follow-up on the earlier Stability and Growth Pact and the Euro Plus Pact intended as a means of optimising macroeconomic surveillance in Europe and avoiding crises in the eurozone in the future. Welcoming the parliament's adoption of the legislation on 28 October 2011, Buzek stated: "The adoption of the six-pack by the whole European Parliament is good news for the European Union. We have a new economic rule-book. We have developed a powerful and resistant armour against any future crises. With the adoption of the six-pack, the EU significantly strengthens its budget discipline and moves towards true economic governance. We can not turn the clock back, but the package will ensure that Member States budgets will be credible."

One of Buzek's major challenges as EP president was dealing with the allegations of corruption, illegal lobbying and mismanagement of public funds of which several members of the European Parliament have been accused in the wake of a cash-for-amendments scandal. On 7 July 2011, the Conference of Presidents approved the first-ever code of conduct for MEPs and it was officially endorsed by the parliament on 1 December 2011. The code sets out rules and principles that MEPs should follow in their dealings with outside parties in order to avoid conflicts of interest. "Increased powers of the European Parliament must be accompanied by an increased transparency and accountability on behalf of its members" Buzek has said of the code. According to the code, MEPs have to provide clear declarations of their paid activities outside parliament, as well as the salary they receive. They also have to declare all other activities which might constitute a conflict of interest. The code contains an explicit ban on MEPs receiving payments or other rewards in exchange for influencing parliamentary decisions. It also sets out clear rules on the acceptance of gifts and on the issue of former MEPs working as lobbyists.

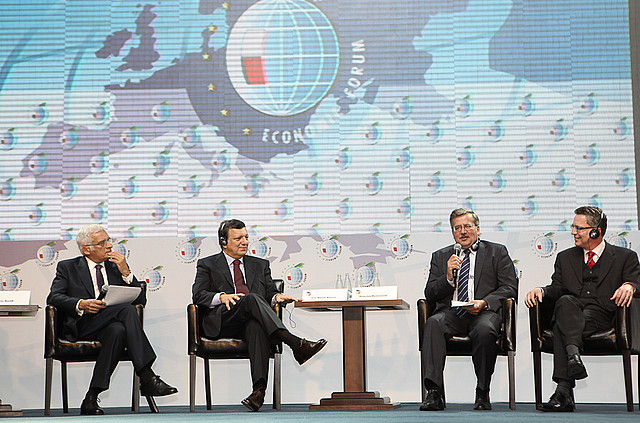
Jerzy Buzek with President of the European Commission José Manuel Barroso and Polish President Bronisław Komorowski

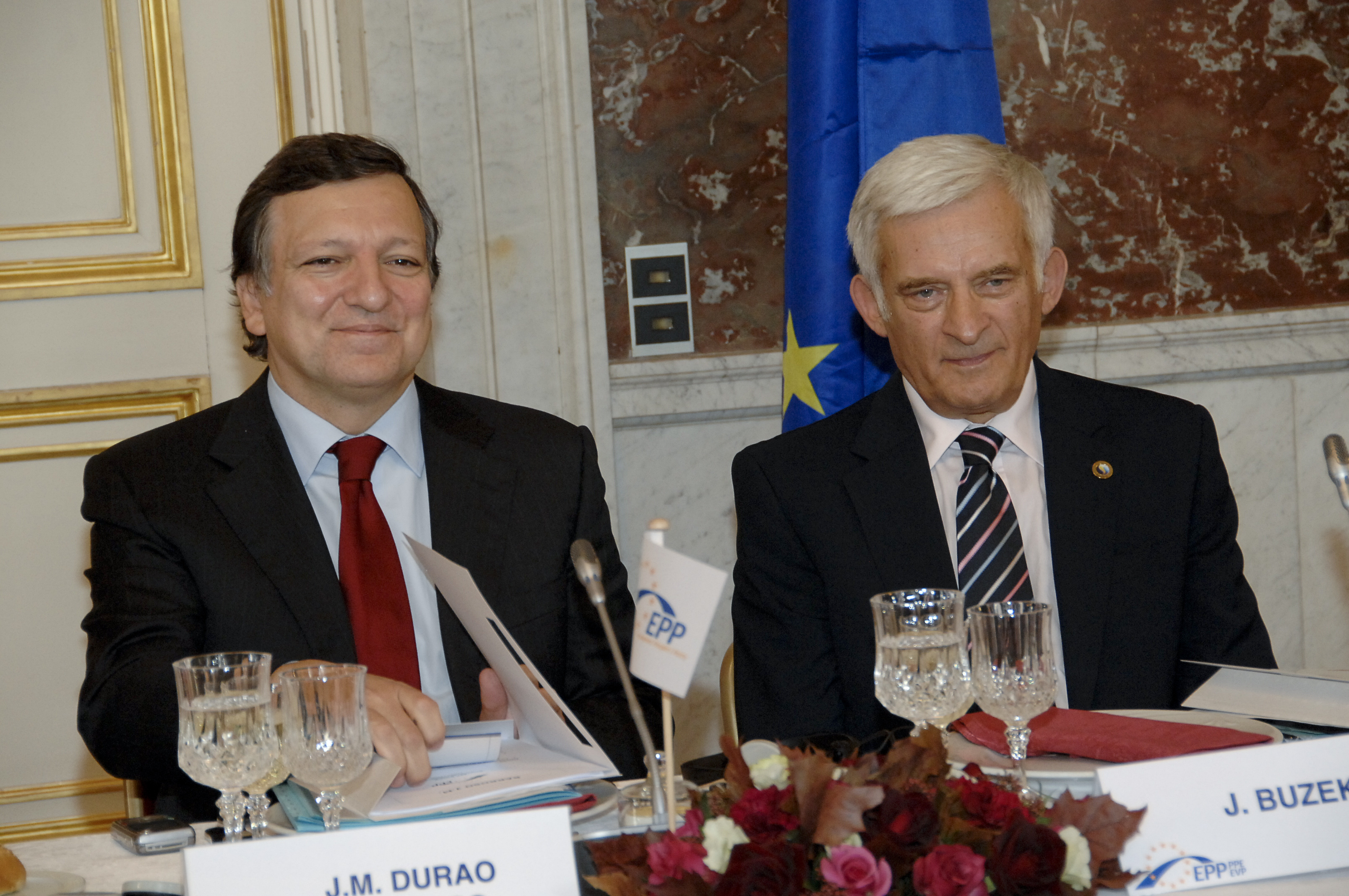
Jerzy Buzek and Jose Manuel Barroso during an EPP Summit in 2009

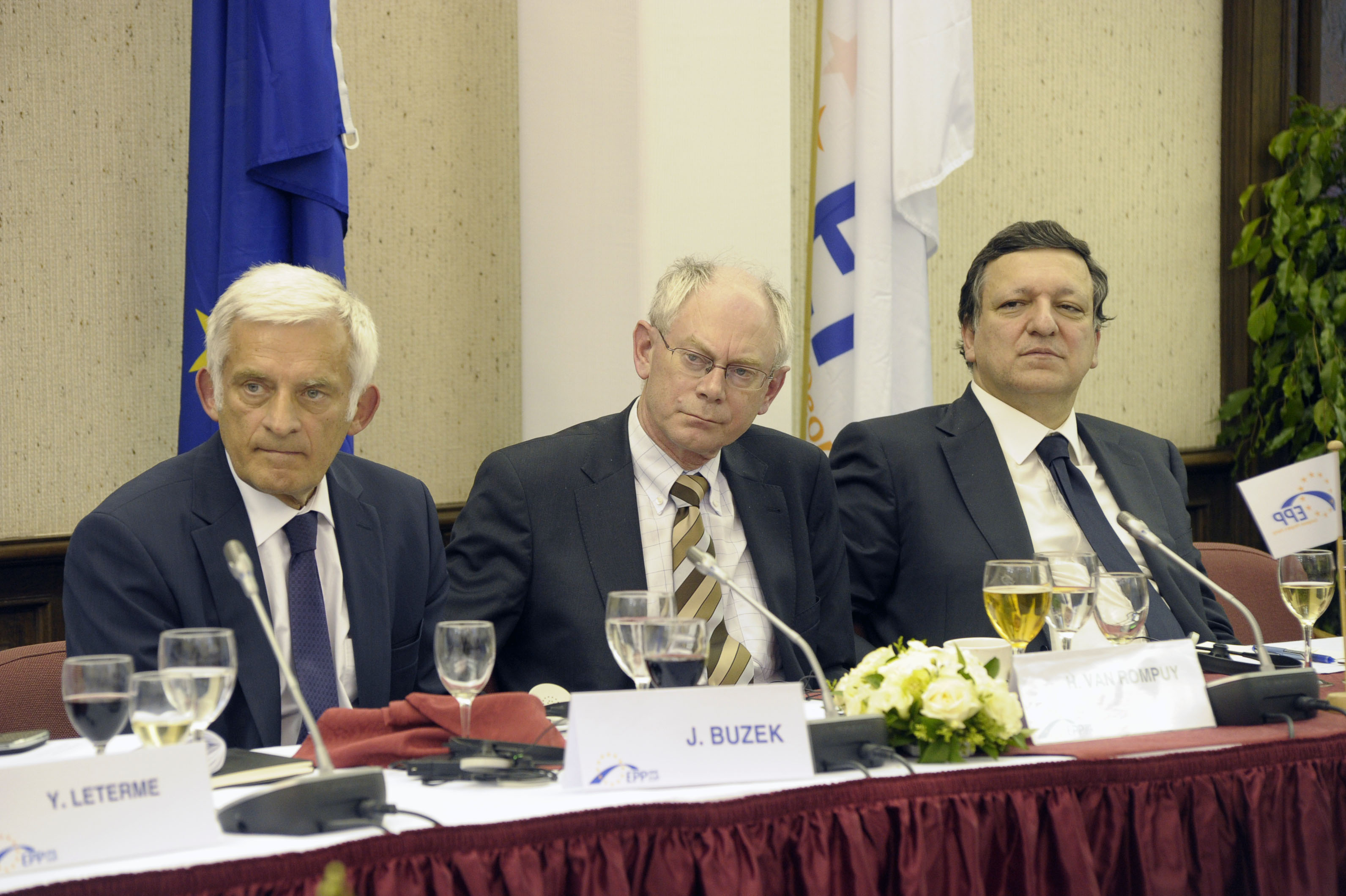
European Big Three; Jerzy Buzek, Herman Van Rompuy, José Manuel Barroso

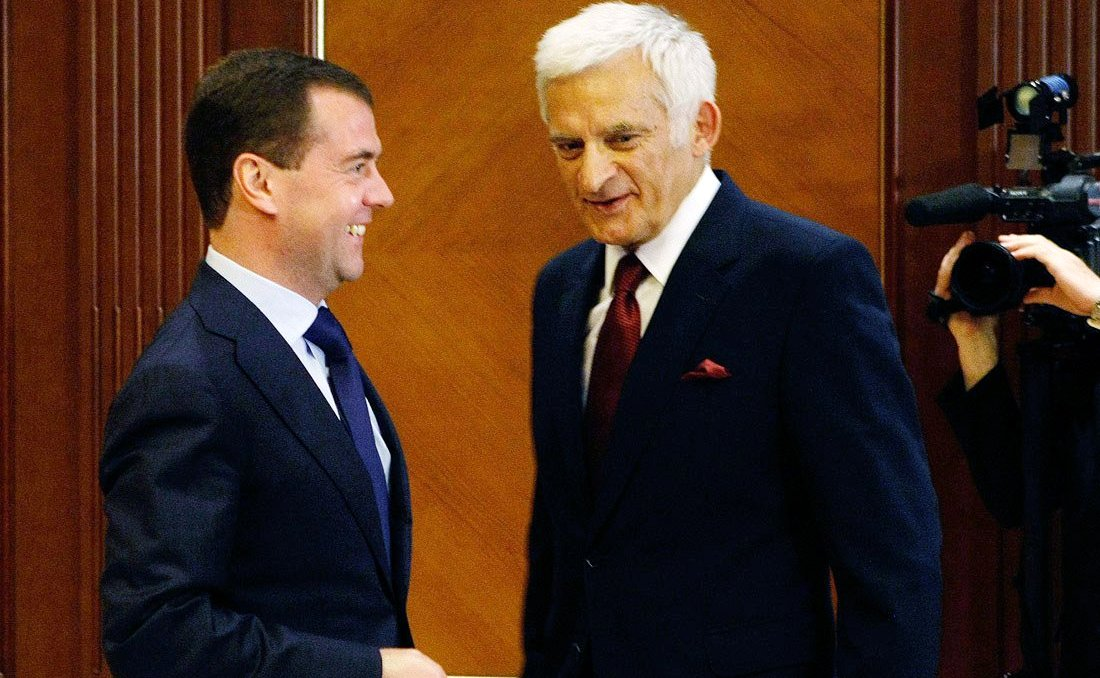
Jerzy Buzek with Russian President Dmitry Medvedev

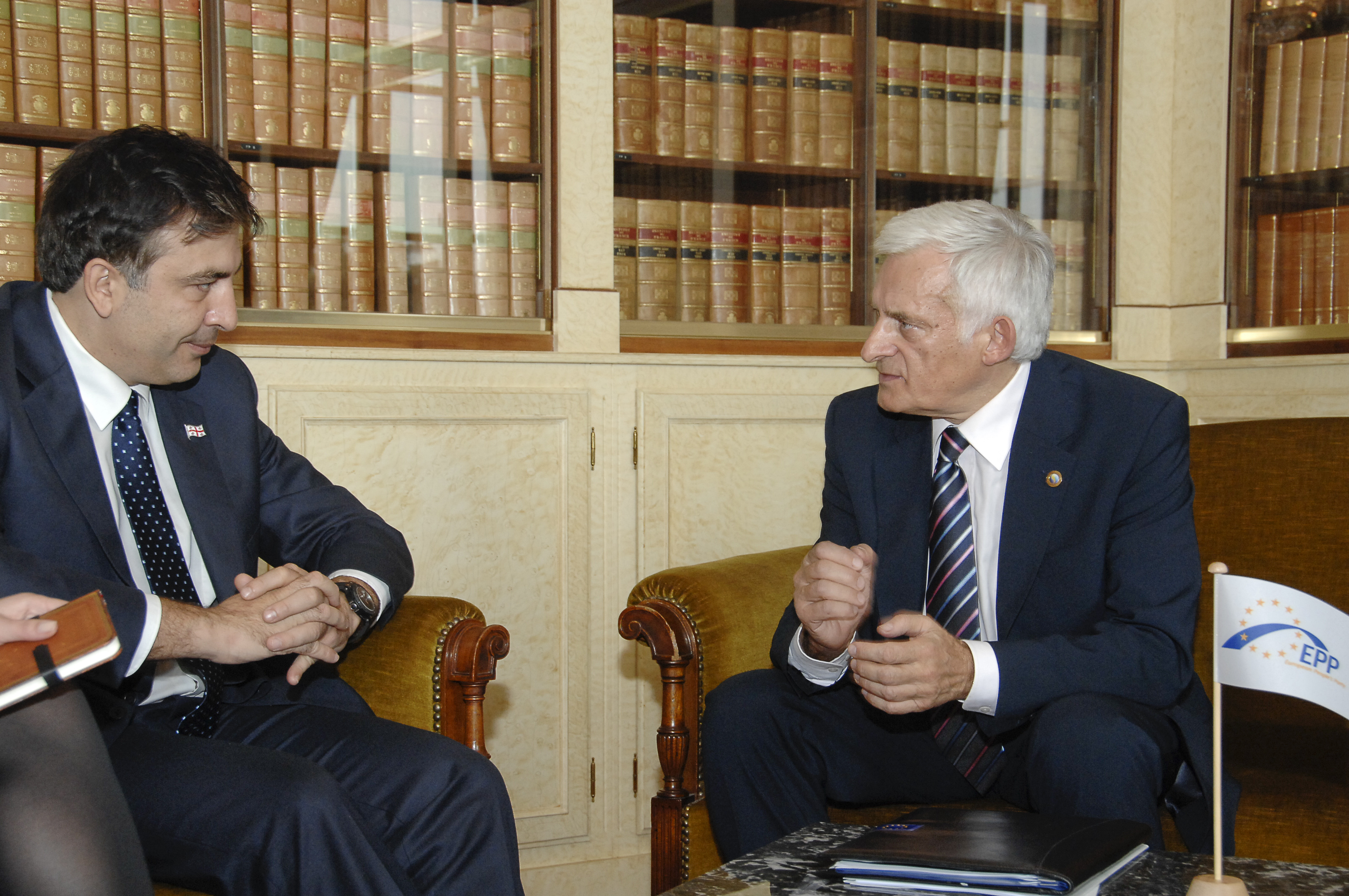
Jerzy Buzek with President of Georgia Mikheil Saakashvili

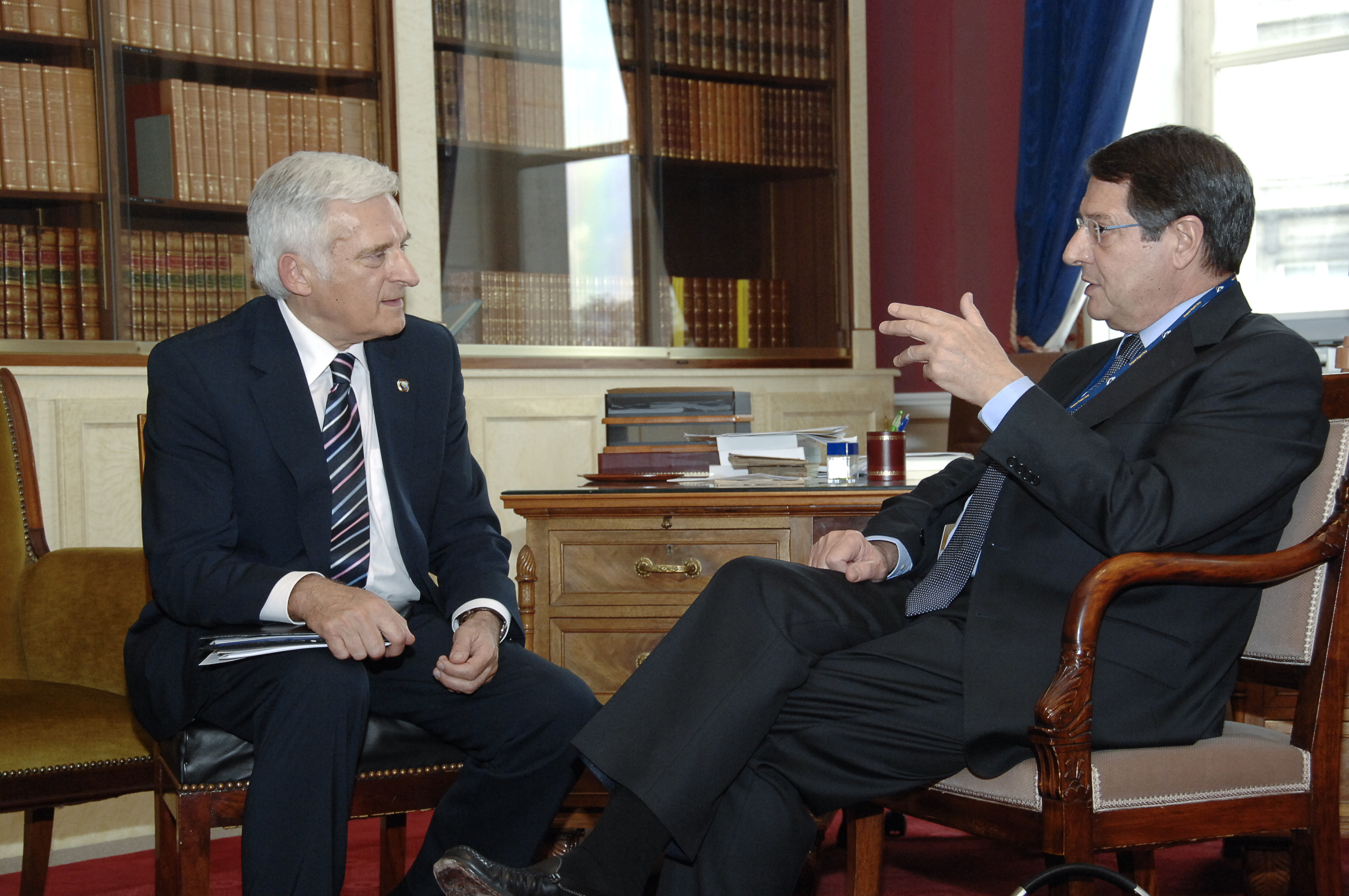
Jerzy Buzek with Nicos Anastasiades

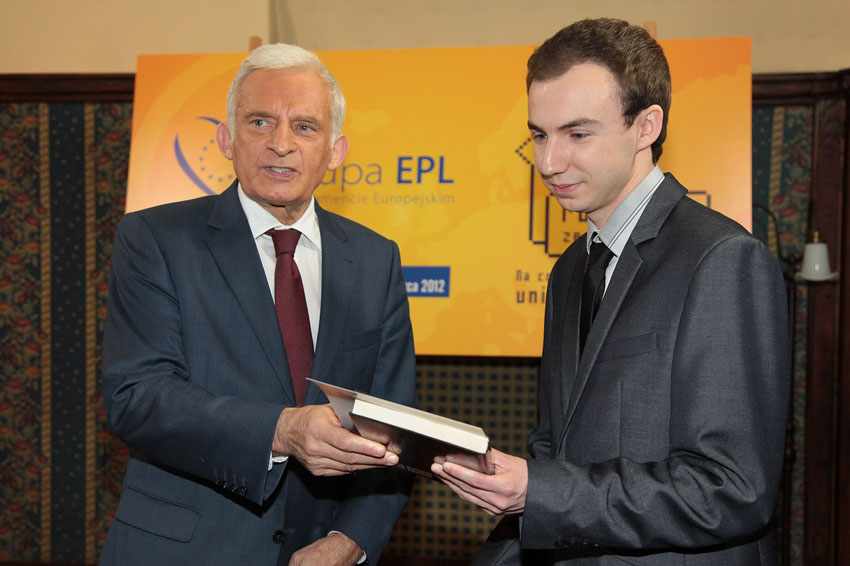
Jerzy Buzek with Polish journalist Paweł Rogaliński

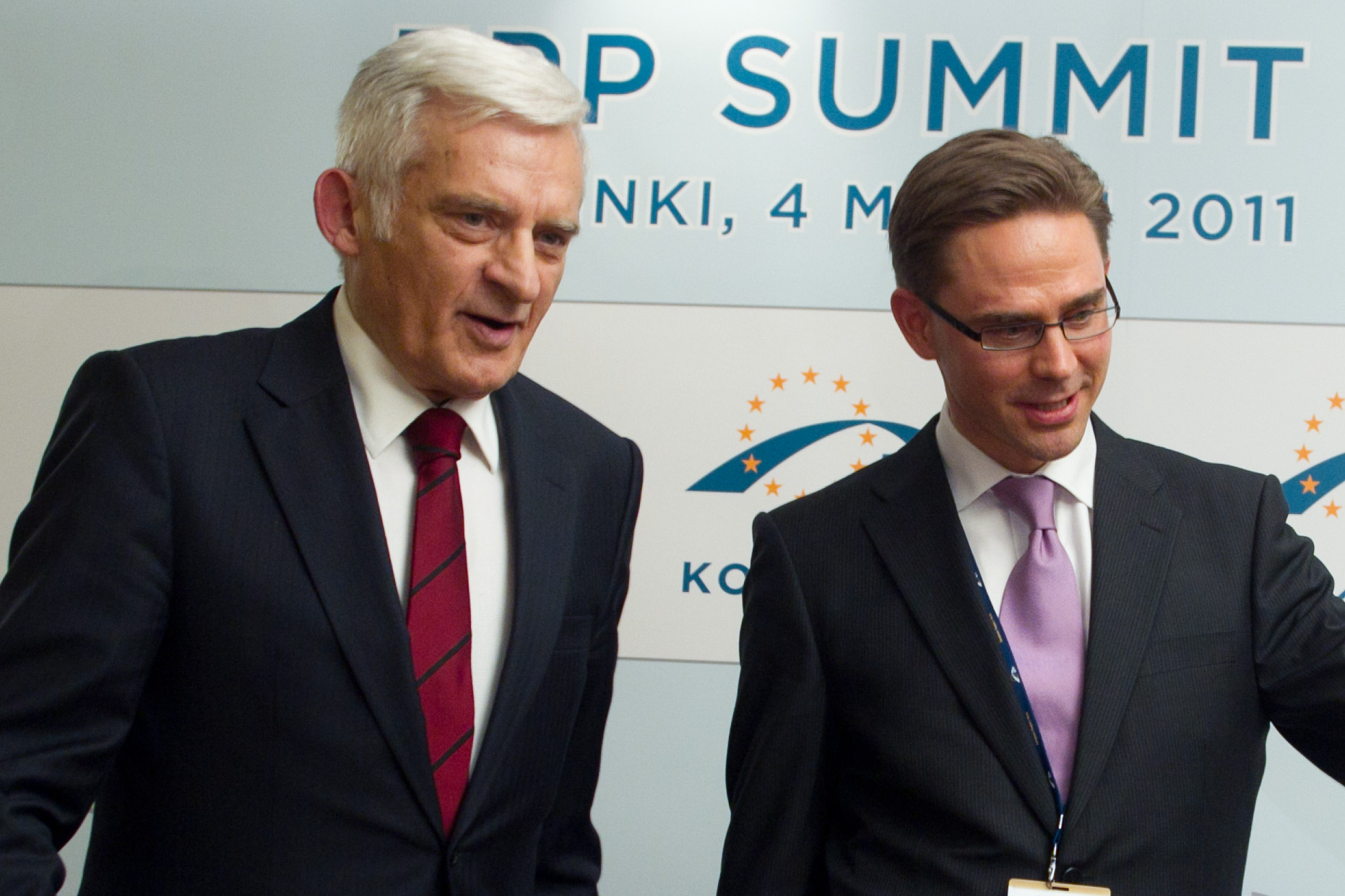
Jerzy Buzek with Jyrki Katainen

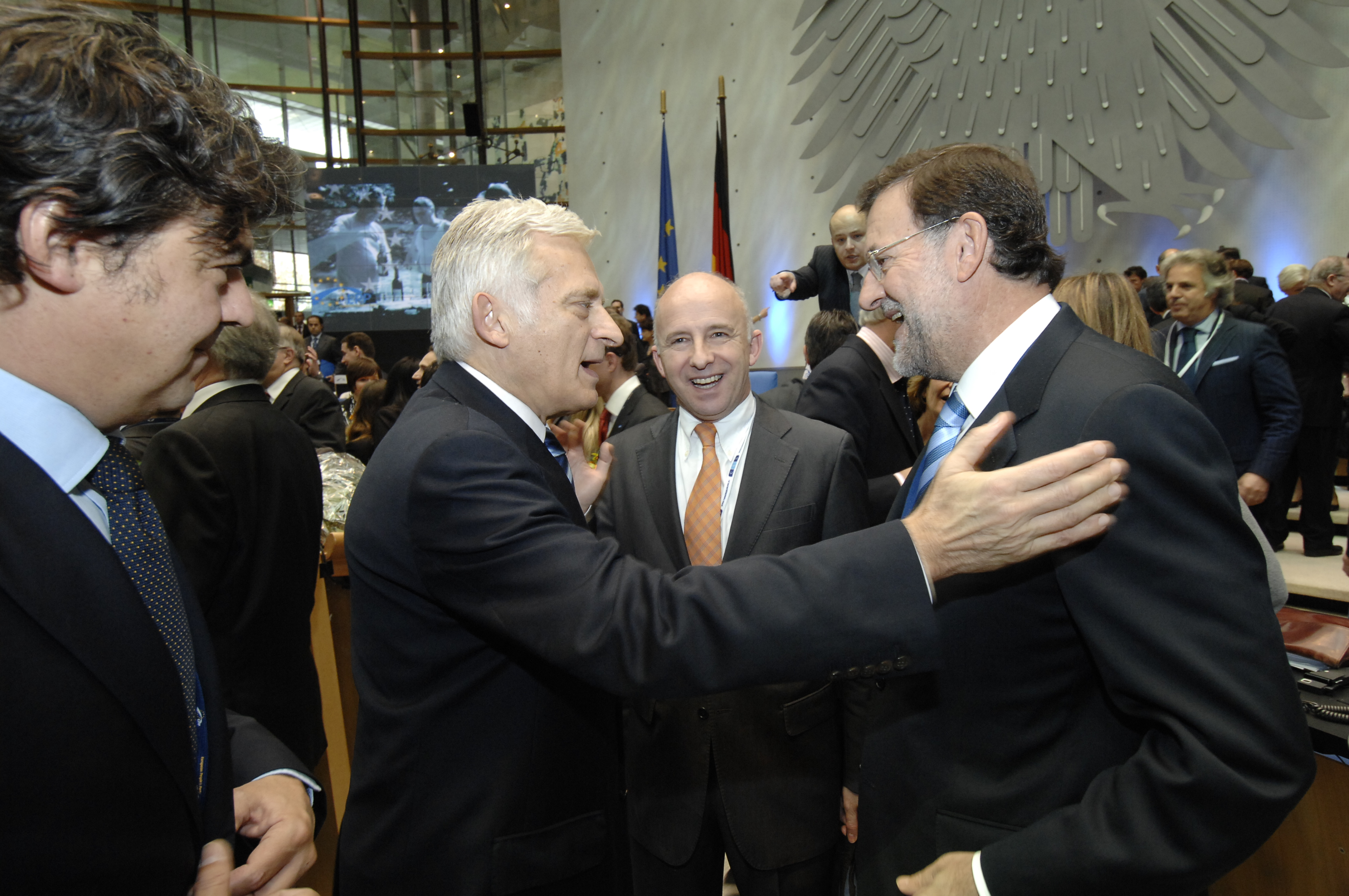
Jerzy Buzek with Mariano Rajoy

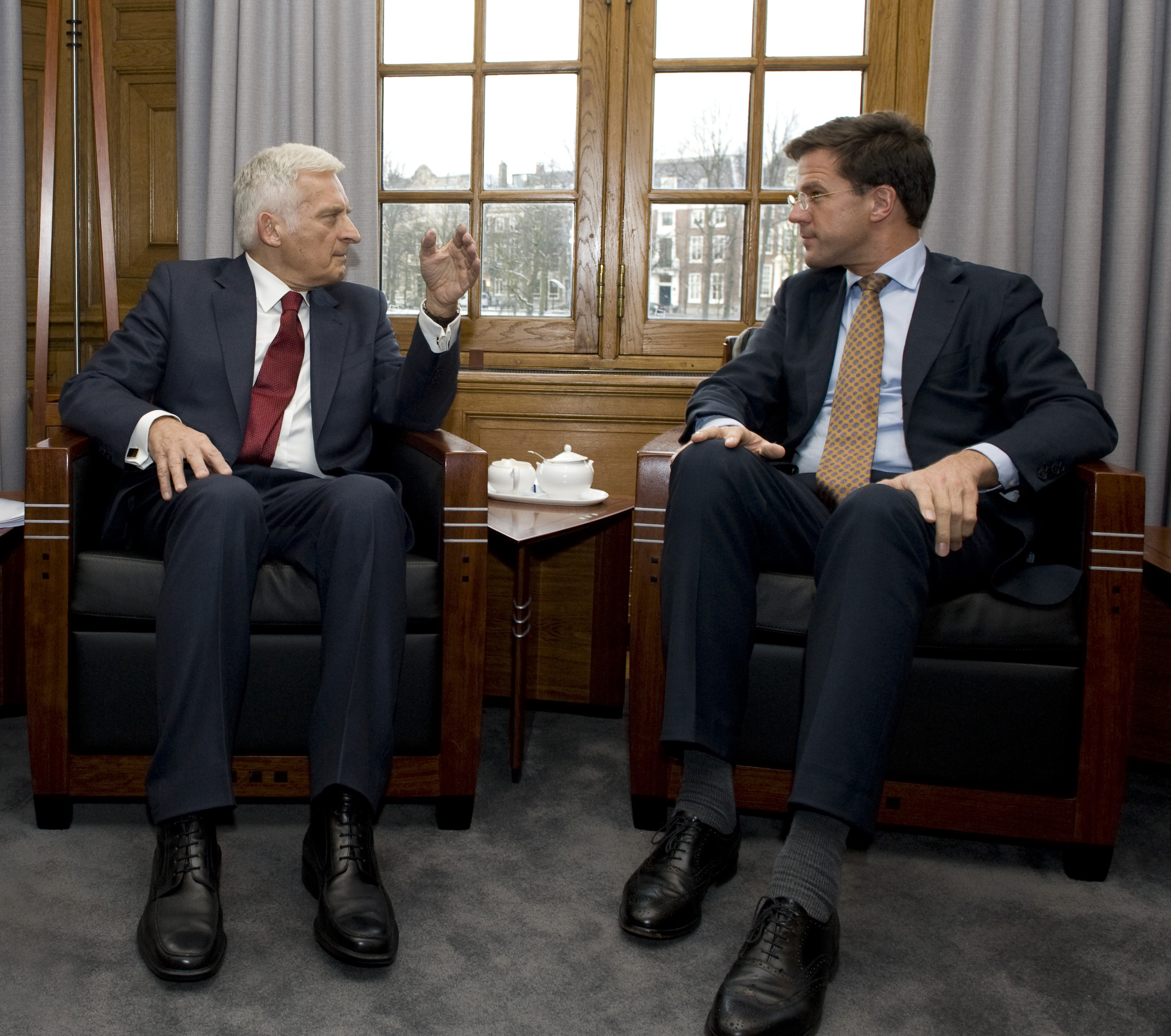
Jerzy Buzek with Prime Minister of the Netherlands Mark Rutte

== Career timeline ==
=== Education ===
- From 1997 to 2001: Professor of technical sciences, actively engaged in public work, Prime Minister of Poland;
- Honorary doctorates of the Universities of Dortmund, Seoul, Süleyman Demirel University (Isparta);
- University lecturer of long standing at Opole, Gliwice and Częstochowa, researcher at the Institute of the Polish Academy of Sciences in Gliwice;
- 1972: Research stay, on a British Council scholarship, at the University of Cambridge.

=== Career ===
- 1992–1997: Representative of Poland at the International Energy Agency – Programme of Greenhouse Gas Effect;
- 1996: Organiser and chairman of an international network of 19 institutions working on energy and environmental protection;
- Author of some 200 research papers, over a dozen rationalisations and three patents in the fields of environmental protection, power and process engineering;
- 1981: Member of the independent, self-governing trade union 'NSZZ Solidarność', Chairman of the I National Congress of Delegates of 'Solidarność';
- 1981: Active in the Solidarność underground structure;
- 1997: Elected as a Member of the Polish Parliament;
- As Prime Minister, in 1999, took Poland into NATO and prepared the country for integration into the European Union (including decentralisation of the State – consolidation of the role of local self-government);
- In 1998, began accession negotiations;
- 1999: Represented the Social Movement of Solidarity Electoral Action (Akcja Wyborcza Solidarność) in the PPE–DE;
- 1999: Established the annual Pro Publico Bono prize for the best national civic initiatives;
- Set up the Family Foundation together with his wife (1998), having gained greater understanding of the meaning of help for the needy after their experiences with the battle for the life of their own child.
- 2012: Member of the International Honorary Council of the European Academy of Diplomacy.

== Personal life ==
He is a supporter of Ruch Chorzów.

== Honours and awards ==
- Knight Grand Cross of the Order of Isabella the Catholic (Kingdom of Spain, 11 May 2001).
- In 2010, he received Collier award of the Fondation du Mérite européen from Jacques Santer on the occasion of 40th anniversary of the Fondation for his role as President of the European Parliament
- European Union:In 2020, he received the Outstanding Achievement Award at The Parliament Magazine's MEP Awards.

== Notes ==
Political offices
Preceded by Włodzimierz Cimoszewicz	Prime Minister of Poland; 1997–2001	Succeeded by Leszek Miller
Preceded by Hans-Gert Pöttering	President of the European Parliament; 2009–2012	Succeeded by Martin Schulz
Academic offices
Preceded by Yves Leterme	Invocation Speaker of the College of Europe; 2009	Succeeded by Angela Merkel
