= Włodzimierz Cimoszewicz =

Prime Minister of Poland from 1996 to 1997

His Excellency Włodzimierz Cimoszewicz MEP
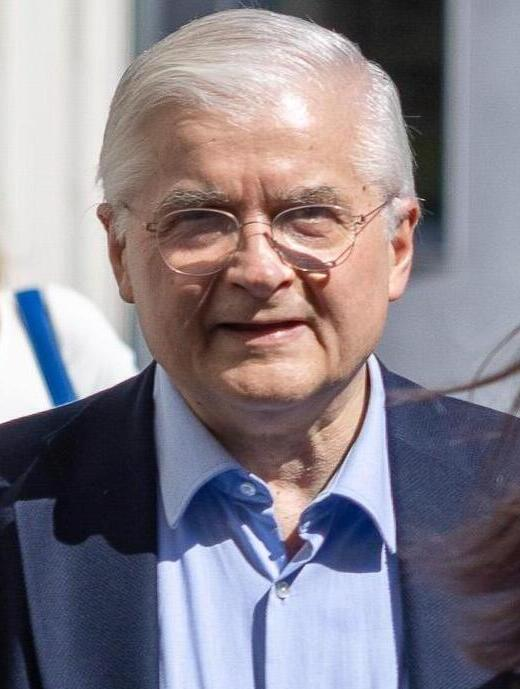
- Cimoszewicz in 2024

Prime Minister of Poland
- In office 7 February 1996 – 31 October 1997
- President: Aleksander Kwaśniewski
- Deputy: Grzegorz Kołodko; Roman Jagieliński; Mirosław Pietrewicz; Marek Belka; Jarosław Kalinowski
- Preceded by: Józef Oleksy
- Succeeded by: Jerzy Buzek

Marshal of the Sejm
- In office 5 January 2005 – 18 October 2005
- Preceded by: Józef Oleksy
- Succeeded by: Marek Jurek

Minister of Foreign Affairs
- In office 19 October 2001 – 5 January 2005
- Prime Minister: Leszek Miller; Marek Belka
- Preceded by: Władysław Bartoszewski
- Succeeded by: Adam Daniel Rotfeld

Minister of Justice Public Prosecutor General
- In office 26 October 1993 – 1 March 1995
- Prime Minister: Waldemar Pawlak
- Preceded by: Jan Piątkowski
- Succeeded by: Jerzy Jaskiernia

Member of the European Parliament for Poland
- In office 1 July 2019 – 15 July 2024

Member of the Sejm
- In office 4 June 1989 – 18 October 2005

Personal details
- Born: 13 September 1950 (age 75) Warsaw, Poland
- Party: Independent (since 2005); Progressive Alliance of Socialists and Democrats (since 2019); The Left (since 2019)
- Other political affiliations: United Workers' Party (1971–1990); Social Democracy (1990–1999); Democratic Left Alliance (1999–2005)
- Spouse: Barbara Cimoszewicz
- Children: 2
- Education: University of Warsaw
- Awards: Order of the White Star Order for Merits to Lithuania

Włodzimierz Cimoszewicz (Note: Polish pronunciation: [vwɔˈd͡ʑimjɛʂ t͡ɕimɔˈʂɛvit͡ʂ]) (born 13 September 1950) is a Polish politician who served as Prime Minister of Poland for a year from 7 February 1996 to 31 October 1997, after being defeated in the Parliamentary elections by the Solidarity Electoral Action (AWS).

== Career ==
Cimoszewicz was a member of the left-wing Democratic Left Alliance the leftist candidate in the Polish presidential election of 1990, receiving 9 percent of the vote.

Cimoszewicz was the Prime Minister of Poland from 1996 to late 1997. October 1996, he became the chairman (office in the rank of minister) of the newly established Committee for European Integration, responsible for preparing Poland for accession negotiations with the European Union. He held this position until 31 October 1997.

Cimoszewicz was the Foreign Minister of Poland in the governments of Leszek Miller (2001–2004) and Marek Belka (2004–2005). It was during this time that he, along with Leszek Miller, signed the Accession Treaty that paved way to Polish membership in the European Union.

Cimoszewicz was the speaker of the Sejm (lower chamber of the Polish parliament) from January to October 2005.

Cimoszewicz was for a time a candidate for the 2005 Polish presidential election; but he withdrew before the elections and promised to abandon politics.

On 28 June 2005, Cimoszewicz declared his intent to run for Polish President (see: Election 2005). He instantly became a leader in the polls. He ran previously in 1990 and received 9.21 percent of the vote. In 1990, Lech Wałęsa and Stan Tymiński went on to the second round. Cimoszewicz did not run in the years 1995 and 2000 giving way to his close colleague Aleksander Kwaśniewski who twice became president. His election committee was chaired by the wife of President Kwaśniewski, Jolanta Kwaśniewska.

On 9 July 2005, Cimoszewicz caused a major political uproar by refusing to testify in front of the Orlen commission. He accused seven of its eight members of being politically motivated, partial and bent on undermining his presidential bid. Constitutional experts are split on whether his move was constitutional or if Cimoszewicz broke the law. Fifty-eight percent of Poles disapproved of Cimoszewicz's behaviour before the commission.

According to a poll by Rzeczpospolita, Cimoszewicz was a "hands down" leader on 5 July 2005:

- Cimoszewicz: 28%
- Kaczyński: 19%
- Lepper: 17%
- Religa: 15%
- Tusk: 11%
- Borowski: 5%

He was predicted to win the second round, independent of who was going to reach it from second place. The election was won by Lech Kaczyński.

Cimoszewicz returned to politics during the 2007 parliamentary election, when he won a Senate seat as an independent candidate. He kept his senator's seat until the end of term in 2015.

In 2009, he was one of two candidates to replace Terry Davis as Secretary General of the Council of Europe. However, in September 2009, the Parliamentary Assembly of the Council of Europe elected candidate Thorbjørn Jagland as the new secretary general.

Since 2015 Cimoszewicz is workstream leader for the Agency for the Modernisation of Ukraine (AMU), where he is responsible for combatting corruption.

In the 2019 European Parliament election Cimoszewicz was elected as the MEP for the Warsaw constituency.

== On Ukraine ==
In May 2014 Cimoszewicz told an audience that he was unhappy with the way the Russian annexation of Crimea was handled. "The democratic West has so far not reacted in a proper way... If we do not stop that aggressive [Russian] policy at an early stage then we can face a much more difficult situation requiring more efforts taking higher risks... There is one element of that crisis which will be very difficult to be solved: the fate of Crimea."

Political offices
Preceded by Jan Piątkowski	Minister of Justice; 1993–1995	Succeeded by Jerzy Jaskiernia
Preceded by Józef Oleksy	Prime Minister of Poland; 1996–1997	Succeeded by Jerzy Buzek
Preceded by Wladyslaw Bartoszewski	Minister of Foreign Affairs; 2001–2005	Succeeded by Adam Daniel Rotfeld
Preceded by Józef Oleksy	Marshal of the Sejm; 2005	Succeeded by Marek Jurek
