= Leszek Miller =

Prime Minister of Poland from 2001 to 2004

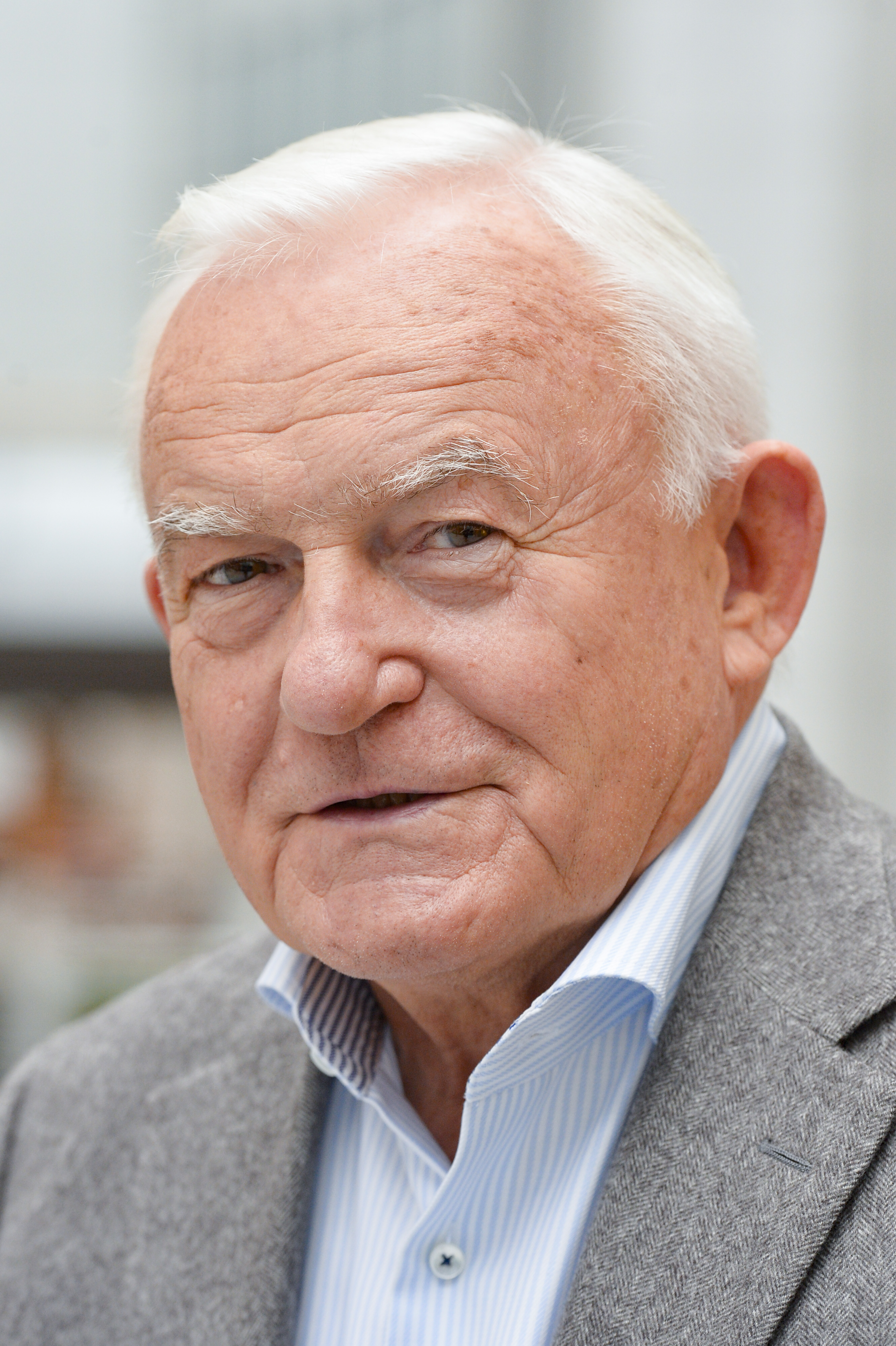
- Miller in 2020

Prime Minister of Poland
- In office 19 October 2001 – 2 May 2004
- President: Aleksander Kwaśniewski
- Deputy: Marek Belka; Jarosław Kalinowski; Marek Pol; Jerzy Hausner; Józef Oleksy
- Preceded by: Jerzy Buzek
- Succeeded by: Marek Belka

Leader of the Democratic Left Alliance
- In office 10 December 2011 – 23 January 2016
- Preceded by: Grzegorz Napieralski
- Succeeded by: Włodzimierz Czarzasty
- In office 15 April 1999 – 6 March 2004
- Preceded by: Position established Himself (As Leader of Social Democracy)
- Succeeded by: Krzysztof Janik

Leader of the Polish Left
- In office 5 January 2008 – 9 January 2010
- Preceded by: Position established
- Succeeded by: Jacek Zdrojewski

Leader of Social Democracy of the Republic of Poland
- In office 21 September 1997 – 15 April 1999
- Preceded by: Józef Oleksy
- Succeeded by: Position abolished Himself (As Leader of the Democratic Left Alliance)

Minister of Interior and Administration
- In office 1 January 1997 – 31 October 1997
- Prime Minister: Włodzimierz Cimoszewicz
- Preceded by: Zbigniew Siemiątkowski
- Succeeded by: Janusz Tomaszewski

Minister of Labour and Social Policy
- In office 26 October 1993 – 7 February 1996
- Prime Minister: Waldemar Pawlak; Józef Oleksy
- Preceded by: Jacek Kuroń
- Succeeded by: Andrzej Bądkowski

Member of the Sejm
- In office 25 November 1991 – 18 October 2005
- In office 8 November 2011 – 11 November 2015

Personal details
- Born: Leszek Cezary Miller; 3 July 1946 (age 80) Żyrardów, Poland
- Party: Polish United Workers' Party (1969–1990); Social Democracy of the Republic of Poland (1990–1999); Democratic Left Alliance (1999–2007, 2010–2021); Polish Left (2007–2010)
- Other political affiliations: Self-Defence of the Republic of Poland (2007)
- Spouse: Aleksandra Miller
- Children: 1
- Awards: Order of the Cross of Terra Mariana National Order of Merit (Malta) Order of the Smile
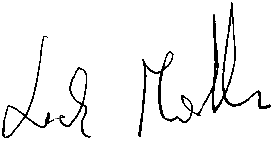
- Signature

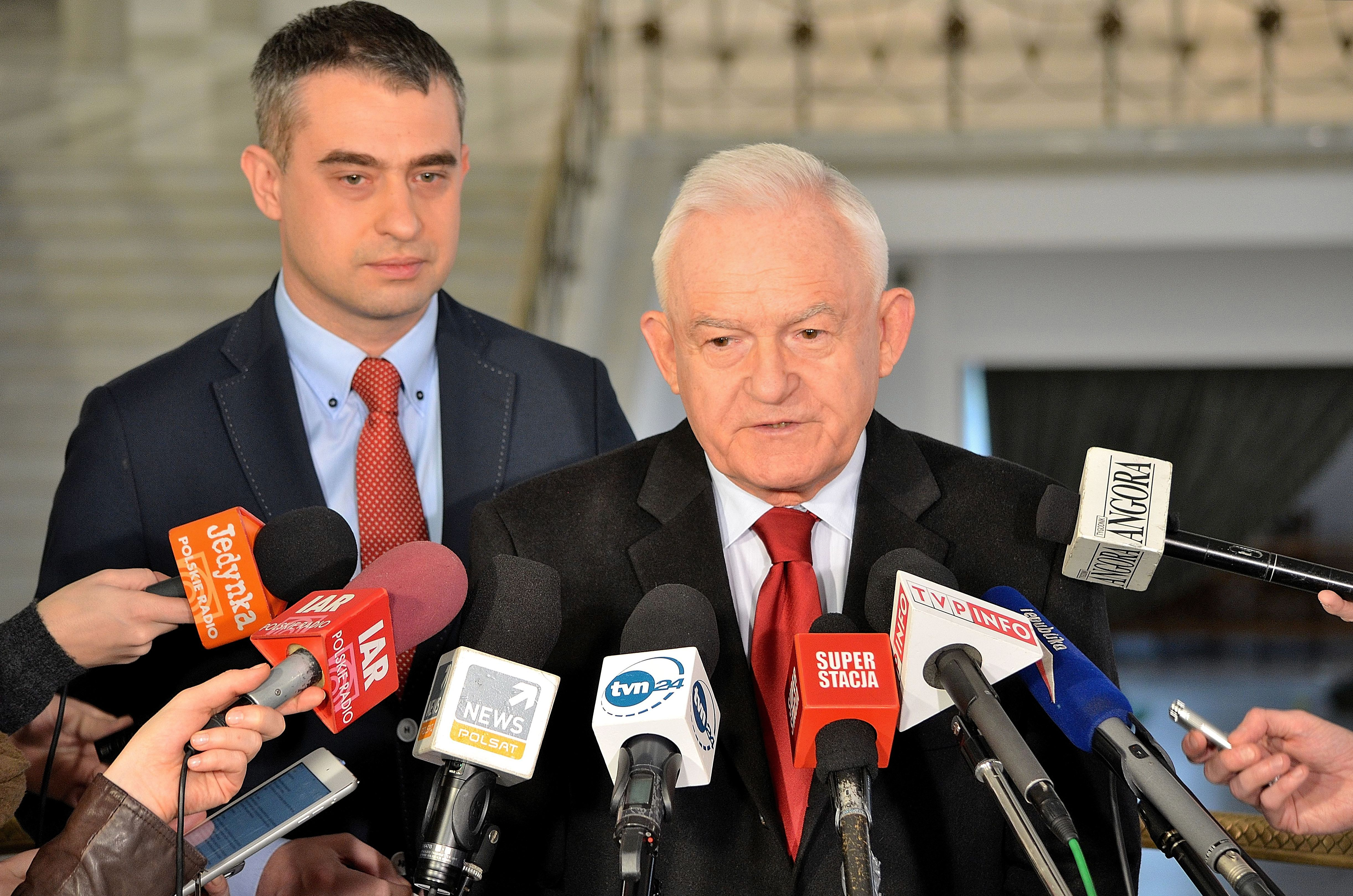
Leszek Miller interviewed in the Sejm (2014)

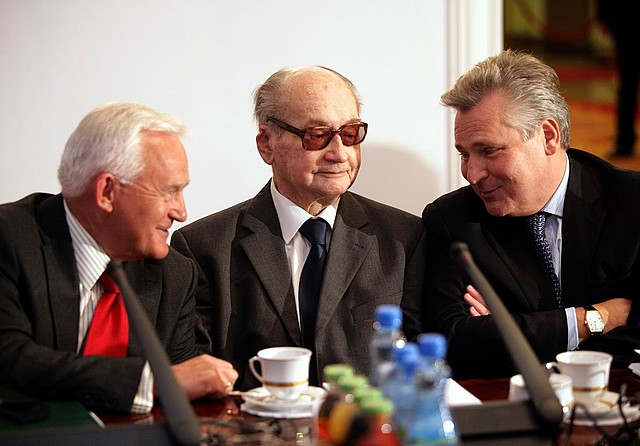
Leszek Miller with former Polish presidents: Wojciech Jaruzelski and Aleksander Kwaśniewski (2010)

Leszek Cezary Miller (Note: Polish pronunciation: [ˈlɛʂɛk ˈmillɛr]) (born 3 July 1946) is a Polish politician who served as prime minister of Poland from 2001 to 2004. He served a single term in the European Parliament from 2019 to 2024.

From 1989 to 1990, Miller was a member of the Politburo of the Polish United Workers' Party. He was the leader of the Democratic Left Alliance from 1999 to 2004 and again from 2011 to 2016.

== Early life ==
Leszek Miller was born in Żyrardów to a poor, working-class family. When he was six months old, his parents separated. His father did not remain in his life thereafter. He was raised by his mother in the Catholic faith, and served as an altar boy at their church.

After graduating from school, 17-year-old Miller got a job in the Textile Linen Plant in Żyrardów while continuing his education in the evenings at the Vocational Secondary School of Electric Power Engineering. He later completed his military service on the ORP Bielik submarine.

== Political career ==
=== Before 1990 ===
Miller started his political career as an activist of the Socialist Youth Union, where he held the position of Chairman of the Plant Board, soon becoming a member of the Town Committee. After the military service, in 1969, he joined the Polish United Workers' Party (PZPR), People's Poland's communist party.

Many people were pressured to join PZPR in order to advance in their careers or to pursue higher education. Miller used his affiliation with the Communist party to effectively advance in his studies and professional goals.

In 1973 and 1974, Miller was the Secretary of the PZPR Plant Committee. With the party's recommendation, he started political sciences studies at the party's Higher School of Political Sciences (Wyższa Szkoła Nauk Społecznych), graduating in 1977. After graduation, Miller worked at the PZPR Central Committee, supervising the Group, and later on the Department of Youth, Physical Education and Tourism.

In July 1986, Miller was elected as First Secretary of the PZPR Provincial Committee in Skierniewice. In December 1988, he returned to Warsaw, due to his promotion to the position of the Secretary of the PZPR Central Committee. As a representative of the government side, he took part in the session of the historic "Round Table", where, together with Andrzej Celiński, he co-chaired the sub-team for youth issues (the only one that closed the session without signing the agreement). In 1989, he became a member of the PZPR Political Bureau.

=== After 1990 ===
After the PZPR was dissolved, Miller became a co-founder of the Social Democracy of the Polish Republic (till March 1993, he was Secretary General, then Deputy Chairman and, from December 1997, the Chairman of that party). In December 1999, at the Founding Congress of the Democratic Left Alliance (SLD), he was elected its Chairman, holding the function continuously until February 2004. In 1997-2001 he was the Chairman of the SLD’s caucus.

In 1989, he ran unsuccessfully for the Senate as a representative of Skierniewice Province. In subsequent elections (1991), Miller was a leader on the election list of the Social Democracy of the Polish Republic in Łódź and, following a considerable success in elections, he won a seat in the Sejm, becoming Chairman of the Parliamentary Group of the Social Democracy of the Polish Republic. In three subsequent elections to the Sejm, he ran each time from Łódź, each time gaining more and more votes (from 50 thousand in 1991 up to 146 thousand in 2001); he held a seat in Parliament until 2005.

Through all that time he remained one of the leading politicians on the left wing. In the early 1990s, together with Mieczysław Rakowski, he was suspected in the case of the so-called "Moscow loan". After revealing that affair in 1991, Włodzimierz Cimoszewicz called Miller to abstain from taking an MP's oath due to accusations laid against him. When Miller was cleared of the charges, Prime Minister Cimoszewicz appointed him later as the Minister in Charge of the Office of the Council of Ministers and in 1997 the Minister of Internal Affairs and Administration in his government. In turn, Cimoszewicz later became the Minister of Foreign Affairs in Miller’s cabinet.

From 1993 to 1996, Miller was the Minister of Labour and Social Policy in the governments of Waldemar Pawlak and Józef Oleksy respectively. In 1996, he was nominated as Senior Minister in charge of the Office of the Council of Ministers. He then got the nickname “The Chancellor”.

Miller played an important role in concluding the case of Colonel Ryszard Kukliński, for which he was severely criticised within his political circle. A similar disapproval was expressed after Miller’s support for the Concordat and the candidature of Leszek Balcerowicz to the position of President of the National Bank of Poland.

During the period of the Solidarity Electoral Action’s government, Miller was in charge of the parliamentary opposition, leading the political fight with the governing party. He was also consolidating the majority of significant left-wing groups around his person. In 1999, he succeeded in establishing one uniform political party – the Democratic Left Alliance – which turned out to be very successful in following elections.

== Prime Minister (2001-2004) ==
Following the victory of the Left (41% vs. 12% of the subsequent party) in the Parliamentary Election in 2001, on 19 October 2001, President Aleksander Kwaśniewski appointed Miller Prime Minister and obliged to nominate the government. The new government won the parliamentary vote of confidence on 26 October 2001 (306:140 votes with one abstention). The 16-person cabinet of Prime Minister Miller has been the smallest government of the Polish Republic so far.

Miller’s government faced a difficult economic situation in Poland, including an unemployment rate above 18%, a high level of public debt, and economic stagnation. At the end of Miller’s term, economic growth exceeded 6%; still, it was too slow to reduce the unemployment rate. During his term, the unpopular program of cuts in public expenses was implemented, together with a hardly successful reform of health care financing. The reforms of the tax system and of the Social Insurance Institution were continued, and the attempt to settle the mass-media market failed. Taxes were significantly lowered – to 19% for companies and for persons running business activity – and the act of freedom in business activity was voted through. A radical, structural reform of secret services was implemented (the State Security Office was dissolved and replaced by the Internal Security Agency and the Intelligence Agency).

Simultaneously, institutional and legal adjustments were continued, resulting from the accession to the European Union. The Accession conditions were negotiated, being the main strategic goal of Miller’s cabinet. On 13 December 2002, at the summit in Copenhagen (Denmark), Prime Minister Leszek Miller completed the negotiations with the European Union. On 16 April 2003 in Athens, Miller, together with Cimoszewicz, signed the Accession Treaty, bringing Poland into the European Union. Miller’s government, in collaboration with various political and social forces, organized the accession referendum with a successful outcome. On 7 and 8 June 2003, 77.45% of the referendum participants voted in favor of Poland’s accession to the European Union. The referendum turn-out reached 58.85%.

Miller’s government, together with President Kwaśniewski, made a decision (March 2003) to join the international coalition and deploy Polish troops to Iraq, targeting at overthrowing Saddam Hussein’s government. Miller was also a co-signatory of "the letter of 8", signed by eight European prime ministers, supporting the US position on Iraq. Already in 2002, Miller gave permission to the U.S. government to run a secret CIA prison at Stare Kiejkuty military training center, three hours north of Warsaw. Years later he is facing accusations of acting anti-constitutionally by having tolerated the imprisonment and torture of prisoners. On 4 December 2003, Leszek Miller suffered injuries in a helicopter crash near Warsaw.

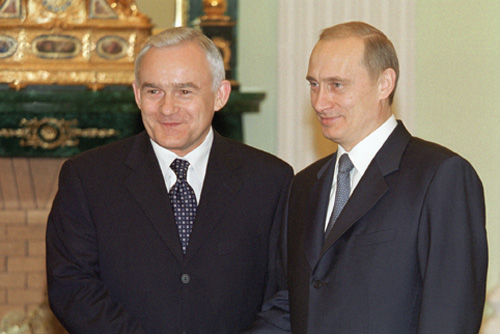
President of Russia Vladimir Putin with Polish Prime Minister Leszek Miller (2001)

At the end of its term of office, Miller’s government had the lowest public support of any government since 1989. It was mainly caused by the continuing high unemployment rate, corruption scandals, with Rywingate on top, and by the attempt of fulfilling the plan of reducing social spending (the Hausner’s plan). In result of criticism in his own party, the Democratic Left Alliance, in February 2004, Miller resigned from chairing the party. Miller was criticized for an excessively liberal approach and for stressing the role of free-market mechanisms in economy. He was reproached for his acceptance of a flat tax, which ran counter to the left-wing doctrine. He was also identified with the “chieftain-like style” of leadership. On 26 March 2004, following the decision of the Speaker of the Parliament, Marek Borowski, to found a new dissenting party, the Social Democracy of Poland, Miller decided to resign from the position of Prime Minister on 2 May 2004, one day after Poland’s accession to the EU. On 1 May 2004, together with President Kwaśniewski, he was in Dublin, taking part in the Grand Ceremony of the accession of 10 states, including Poland, to the European Union.

== Later career ==
In 2005, despite the support of the Łódź Branch of the Democratic Left Alliance, Miller was not registered on the election list to the Parliament. At the same time, he was offered to run for Senate but refused. Retirement of the old activists was presented in media as “inflow of new blood into the Democratic Left Alliance”. After the election, Miller became active in journalism, writing mainly for the “Wprost” weekly on liberal economic concepts and current political issues. In the first half of 2005, he stayed at the Woodrow Wilson International Center for Scholars in Washington, D.C., implementing a research project: “Status of the new Poland in the Eastern Europe’s space”.

In September 2007, Leszek Miller become affiliated with Samoobrona, when he decided to run for the Sejm from their lists. In January 2008, at the first congress of the newly founded Polish Left party, he became its chairman. In December 2009, he submitted a membership declaration to the SLD. In January 2010, he resigned from the Polish Left and was admitted to the SLD in the same month. In 2010 he became a columnist of the Wednesday edition of "Super Express". In the parliamentary elections in 2015, he was not re-elected as an MP (the United Left, co-created by the SLD, did not pass the electoral threshold). He did not run for re-election as chairman of the SLD on 23 January 2016, and he was replaced in this function by Włodzimierz Czarzasty. On 8 March 2021, after the legally binding judicial re-registration of the Democratic Left Alliance to New Left (as part of the final project of merging SLD and Spring), he announced his departure from the party.

== Personal life ==
In 1969, Miller married Aleksandra, three years his junior, in church. They had a son, Leszek Junior (d. August 2018), and a granddaughter, Monika.

== Bibliography ==
- J. Machejek, A. Machejek, Leszek Miller: dogońmy Europę!(wywiad-rzeka z liderem SLD)(Catch up with Europe! An extended interview with the Leader of the Democratic Left Alliance), Hamal Books, 2001.
- L. Stomma, Leszek Miller WDK 2001

Political offices
Preceded by Jacek Kuroń	Minister of Labor and Social Policy; 1993–1996	Succeeded by Andrzej Bądkowski
Preceded by Zbigniew Siemiątkowski	Minister of Internal Affairs and Administration; 1997	Succeeded by Janusz Tomaszewski
Preceded by Jerzy Buzek	Prime Minister of Poland; 2001–2004	Succeeded by Marek Belka
Party political offices
Preceded by Józef Oleksy	Leader of Social Democracy; 1997–1999	Position abolished
New office	Leader of the Democratic Left Alliance; 1999–2004	Succeeded by Krzysztof Janik
New office	Leader of the Polish Left; 2008–2010	Succeeded by Jacek Zdrojewski
Preceded by Grzegorz Napieralski	Leader of the Democratic Left Alliance; 2011–2016	Succeeded by Włodzimierz Czarzasty
