= Opinion polling for the 2001 Polish parliamentary election =

In the run up to the 2001 Polish parliamentary election, various organisations carried out opinion polling to gauge voting intention in Poland. Results of such polls are displayed in this article.

== Graphical summary ==
Graphical summary of opinion polls: Democratic Left Alliance – Labour Union Civic Platform Self-Defence Law and Justice Polish People's Party League of Polish Families Solidarity Electoral Action Freedom Union Democratic Left Alliance (Note: Contested election under the Democratic Left Alliance – Labour Union (Polish: Sojusz Lewicy Demokratycznej–Unia Pracy) alliance.) Labour Union Movement for Reconstruction of Poland (Note: Contested election in the lists of the League of Polish Families.)

== Sejm ==
=== 2001 ===
Dates of Polling	Polling Firm/Link	AWS	SLD	UP	UW	PSL	ROP	SRP	PO	PiS	LPR	Others / Undecided	Lead
23 September 2001	Election results	5.6	41		3.1	9	w. LPR	10.2	12.7	9.5	7.9	1	28.3
19–20 September	TNS OBOP	5	46		3	11	-	9	14	7	5	-	32
18 September	TNS OBOP	4	43		4	12	-	9	15	7	5	1	28
17–18 September	OBW	6	45		3	10	-	7	14	9	5	1	31
September 2001	PBS	8	47		5	9	-	5	14	7	4	1	33
14–16 September	Pentor	4	51		3	7	-	8	13	9	4	1	38
13–16 September	CBOS	5	50		3	9	-	6	13	9	5	0	37
13–14 September	TNS OBOP	7	48		2	11	-	5	14	8	5	0	34
10–12 September	OBW	8	47		3	11	-	5	13	10	3	0	34
8–11 September	TNS OBOP	5	52		3	10	-	5	14	7	3	1	38
6–7 September	TNS OBOP	7	50		4	12	-	4	12	8	3	0	38
4 September	TNS OBOP	8	52		4	9	-	2	14	8	3	0	38
2–4 September	OBW	7	46		4	13	-	4	13	9	3	5	33
1–2 September	PBS	9	50		4	11	w. LPR	4	12	7	2	1	38
30 August	TNS OBOP	8	50		4	12	-	2	12	8	3	1	38
19–22 August	TNS OBOP	8	47		4	12	-	2	13	8	3	3	34
18–21 August	OBW	6	48		4	11	-	4	12	9	3	3	36
15–16 August	TNS OBOP	8	47		4	12	-	3	13	6	2	5	34
11–13 August	Pentor	7	52		4	13	-	3	12	6	3	3	39
10 August	Demoskop	7	56		6	9	-	3	11	6	1	1	45
8 August	PBBOUS	7.3	39.6		4.1	7.3	-	-	13.7	10.2	-	11.9	25.9
3–6 August	PBS	12	49		3	9	w. LPR	3	12	6	2	4	37
3–6 August	CBOS	5	50		4	10	-	1	14	10	1	3	36
2–5 August	TNS OBOP	7	47		4	14	-	2	12	7	1	7	33
26–29 July	TNS OBOP	7	46		4	12	1	1	13	7	1	8	33
26–28 July	OBW	9	46		4	11	-	3	15	9	2	1	31
20–23 July	PBS	12	52		4	8	-	2	12	5	2	3	40
19–22 July	TNS OBOP	10	47		4	13	-	2	14	6	1	3	33
7–9 July	TNS OBOP	6	44		5	15	-	2	16	7	1	3	28
6–9 July	CBOS	6	52		4	13	-	2	13	6	2	2	39
6–9 July	Demoskop	7	51		6	10	-	-	16	7	-	3	35
7–9 July	OBW	7	43		3	10	-	-	17	10	-	10	26
6–9 July	PBS	11	53		5	7	w. AWS	1	12	5	2	4	41
6–8 July	Pentor	10	50		4	12	-	-	14	5	-	5	36
25 June	Demoskop	9	53		5	7	-	-	14	6	-	6	39
23–25 June	TNS OBOP	5	45		3	11	-	4	18	8	-	6	27
22–24 June	Pentor	7	47		4	14	-	-	19	5	-	8	28
15–18 June	OBW	8	42		4	10	-	3	16	11	-	3	26
10–11 June	PBS	13	50		4	10	w. AWS	-	15	5	-	3	35
9–11 June	TNS OBOP	6	50		4	12	-	2	13	10	-	3	37
1–4 June	CBOS	10	48		2	7	-	2	13	5	0	11	35
May	OBW	6	39		4	11	-	-	18	11	-	11	21
26–28 May	TNS OBOP	8	41		4	13	-	2	18	10	-	4	23
25 May	Demoskop	5	44		3	9	1	-	13	-	-	4	31
20 May	OBW	10	41		5	11	-	-	18	-	-	15	23
12–14 May	TNS OBOP	8	38		4	14	4	4	19	-	-	8	19
11–14 May	CBOS	7	46		3	9	3	2	13	5	-	18	33
12–13 May	PBS	11	56		5	9	-	-	15	-	-	4	41
10–12 May	Pentor	9	48	3	4	12	-	-	17	-	-	7	31
24 April	Demoskop	9	43		5	8	2	1	12	-	-	20	31
21–23 April	TNS OBOP	13	43		5	13	3	3	16	-	-	4	27
21 April	Primary Election in Nysa	7.6	46.6		3.0	4.4	-	6.7	16.6	-	-	11.2	30.0
7–9 April	TNS OBOP	10	46		5	12	5	2	14	-	-	6	32
6–9 April	CBOS	9	41		5	12	1	1	11	-	-	20	29
7–8 April	PBS	13	49		6	8	-	-	17	-	-	7	32
24–26 March	TNS OBOP	10	42		4	12	3	3	19	-	-	6	23
24–25 March	PBS	17	43		5	11	-	-	17	-	-	7	26
20–23 March	OBW	13	43		5	12	-	-	17	-	-	10	23
10–12 March	TNS OBOP	9	43		4	11	3	2	18	-	-	10	25
9–12 March	Demoskop	9	36	3	5	6	1	2	15	-	-	23	33
10–11 March	PBS	12	54		5	9	-	-	12	-	-	8	42
8–10 March	Pentor	10	49	3	5	9	2	1	16	-	-	5	33
2–5 March	CBOS	9	44		6	7	2	1	12	-	-	20	32
10–12 February	TNS OBOP	10	40		4	12	3	3	21	-	-	8	19
9–10 February	Pentor	12	45	6	8	10	-	-	14	-	-	5	31
2–6 February	CBOS	9	38	4	6	11	1	0	16	-	-	16	22
27–29 January	TNS OBOP	13	39	3	5	9	3	3	17	-	-	7	22
27–28 January	PBS	14	46	5	5	10	-	-	17	-	-	3	29
January	Demoskop	8	39	-	7	10	-	-	-	-	-	36	29
13–15 January	TNS OBOP	12	45	3	7	14	5	2	-	-	-	12	31
12–14 January	Pentor	13	50	7	10	12	-	-	-	-	-	8	37
5–8 January	CBOS	13	41	4	8	11	2	1	-	-	-	20	28

=== 2000 ===
Dates of Polling	Polling Firm/Link	AWS	SLD	UP	UW	PSL	ROP	SRP	Others/Undecided	Lead
2–4 December	Pentor	16	48	4	11	10	-	-	9	32
1–4 December	CBOS	13	41	4	9	10	2	1	21	28
25–26 November	PBS	17	49	4	11	8	2	-	9	32
18–20 November	TNS OBOP	16	44	2	11	12	4	3	8	28
10–13 November	CBOS	14	41	5	7	10	1	1	21	27
10–12 November	Pentor	14	52	5	10	9	-	-	10	38
11–12 November	PBS	17	51	5	10	8	-	-	9	34
28–30 October	TNS OBOP	14	38	3	9	13	8	3	12	24
13–16 October	CBOS	15	38	4	9	8	1	1	25	23
14–15 October	PBS	20	46	4	10	8	3	-	9	26
7–9 October	Pentor	20	46	6	9	11	-	-	8	26
October 8, 2000	Presidential elections	15.6	53.9	-	-	6.0	-	3.1	21.4	36.6
9–11 September	Pentor	17	50	3	7	13	-	-	10	33
9–10 September	PBS	20	48	-	9	7	-	-	16	28
1–4 September	CBOS	19	40	3	8	7	2	1	21	21
19–21 August	TNS OBOP	15	40	3	13	11	6	3	9	25
12–14 August	Pentor	15	49	5	7	14	-	-	10	34
5–7 August	TNS OBOP	14	43	3	9	12	6	3	10	29
4–7 August	CBOS	16	38	4	6	9	2	1	23	22
5–6 August	PBS	23	44	6	7	9	3	-	8	21
22–24 July	TNS OBOP	17	45	2	9	10	5	4	8	28
8–10 July	TNS OBOP	17	41	3	9	11	4	1	14	24
8–9 July	Pentor	21	47	5	10	8	-	-	8	26
8–9 July	PBS	21	44	6	9	10	4	-	6	23
29 June-4 July	CBOS	13	38	5	9	7	2	1	24	25
15–20 June	CBOS	15	34	5	10	8	1	1	26	19
10–12 June	TNS OBOP	17	42	4	8	9	7	3	10	25
10–11 June	PBS	19	42	7	13	9	3	-	7	23
1–6 June	CBOS	15	37	4	8	6	2	2	27	22
3–4 June	Pentor	13	45	6	11	13	-	-	12	32
27–29 May	TNS OBOP	16	43	3	13	7	4	3	11	27
20–22 May	TNS OBOP	15	40	3	14	10	4	4	10	25
11–16 May	CBOS	14	41	5	9	7	1	2	22	27
14–15 May	Pentor	16	48	4	11	10	-	-	11	32
13–15 May	TNS OBOP	14	40	6	9	10	5	5	11	26
13–14 May	PBS	16	44	6	11	12	-	-	11	28
15–17 April	TNS OBOP	17	38	4	11	10	7	6	7	21
8–10 April	Pentor	16	46	6	13	9	-	-	10	30
8–10 April	TNS OBOP	15	42	6	12	9	6	5	8	27
8–9 April	PBS	18	41	6	14	10	3	-	8	23
30 March-4 April	CBOS	15	38	6	7	7	3	1	24	23
1–3 April	TNS OBOP	18	40	3	11	10	5	4	9	22
19–21 March	TNS OBOP	17	42	2	12	7	3	5	12	25
11–13 March	Pentor	17	47	5	12	8	-	-	11	30
11–12 March	PBS	18	46	6	13	8	2	-	7	28
4–6 March	TNS OBOP	18	37	4	11	11	5	4	10	19
1–8 March	CBOS	16	37	5	7	8	2	1	24	21
12–14 February	Pentor	17	45	5	12	12	-	-	11	28
12–13 February	PBS	19	44	6	12	9	3	-	7	25
3–8 February	CBOS	16	36	5	10	10	1	1	21	20
29–31 January	TNS OBOP	20	42	3	9	8	4	4	10	22
13–18 January	CBOS	16	35	3	11	10	2	1	23	19
15–17 January	Pentor	16	42	6	14	9	-	-	13	26
15–17 January	TNS OBOP	19	42	4	10	8	4	4	9	23
15–16 January	PBS	21	40	6	12	10	2	-	9	19

=== 1999 ===
Dates of Polling	Polling Firm/Link	AWS	SLD	UP	UW	PSL	ROP	SRP	Others/Undecided	Lead
11–13 December	TNS OBOP	16	43	2	12	10	5	4	8	27
1–7 December	CBOS	20	38	4	8	7	2	1	21	18
4–5 December	PBS	20	42	6	12	9	2	-	9	22
27–29 November	TNS OBOP	15	39	4	11	9	5	4	13	24
13–15 November	TNS OBOP	23	33	4	11	11	3	2	13	10
10–15 November	CBOS	20	31	4	10	9	3	1	23	11
6–7 November	PBS	21	43	8	10	8	2	-	8	22
5–11 October	CBOS	17	35	5	10	7	3	1	21	18
9–10 October	PBS	21	41	7	11	9	2	-	9	20
2–4 October	TNS OBOP	23	32	4	10	10	3	7	11	9
18–20 September	TNS OBOP	20	35	5	13	7	6	4	10	15
8–14 September	CBOS	17	33	6	10	8	2	2	22	16
11–12 September	PBS	19	40	7	12	9	4,2	-	8,8	21
4–6 September	TNS OBOP	20	36	4	13	7	4	2	14	16
14–15 August	PBS	23	36	5	11	11	4	-	10	13
4–10 August	CBOS	16	34	5	9	11	2	1	23	18
7–13 July	CBOS	20	33	4	7	8	3	1	24	13
10–11 July	PBS	23	37	6	12	9	4	0	9	14
16–22 June	CBOS	24	31	6	9	9	3	2	18	7
June	Demoskop	19	34	6	15	12	4	-	10	15
19–21 June	TNS OBOP	25	34	4	11	8	4	3	11	9
12–13 June	PBS	25	37	6	13	9	-	-	10	12
29–31 May	TNS OBOP	22	34	3	12	8	3	3	15	12
6–12 May	CBOS	22	30	4	10	8	3	2	22	8
8–9 May	PBS	27	38	6	11	8	3	0	7	11
17–19 April	TNS OBOP	25	31	3	13	8	4	3	13	6
8–13 April	CBOS	23	28	3	7	11	3	2	22	5
10–11 April	PBS	29	36	5	10	7	3	2	8	7
30–31 March	TNS OBOP	24	30	6	13	6	5	4	12	6
13–14 March	PBS	26	35	6	12	7	3	3	8	9
4–9 March	CBOS	22	28	5	9	9	4	2	22	6
6–8 March	TNS OBOP	20	33	3	14	11	5	4	10	13
20–22 February	TNS OBOP	26	29	5	10	12	3	4	11	3
13–14 February	PBS	30	29	6	12	9	-	-	14	1
4–9 February	CBOS	22	29	7	15	11	3	-	14	7
6–8 February	TNS OBOP	25	27	4	14	9	6	-	9	2
30–31 January	PBS	29	33	5	13	8	2	-	10	4
23–26 January	TNS OBOP	30	29	3	15	12	3	-	8	1
16–17 January	PBS	30	32	4	13	9	3	-	9	2
6–12 January	CBOS	28	27	7	11	9	2	-	17	1
8–11 January	TNS OBOP	29	28	5	14	11	3	-	10	1

=== 1998 ===
Dates of Polling	Polling Firm/Link	AWS	SLD	UP	UW	PSL	ROP	Others/Undecided	Lead
12–13 December	PBS	29	31	6	14	8	2	10	2
5–8 December	TNS OBOP	31	28	5	13	10	4	9	3
3–8 December	CBOS	29	28	6	12	9	3	12	1
21–22 November	PBS	33	32	4	13	8	2	8	1
7–10 November	TNS OBOP	34	30	3	12	9	3	9	4
5–9 November	CBOS	28	30	3	12	8	3	16	2
15–20 October	CBOS	38	29	4	7	8	2	11	9
17–18 October	PBS	33	32	5	12	6	2	10	1
3–5 October	TNS OBOP	31	28	4	11	9	4	13	3
17–22 September	CBOS	23	28	8	12	8	4	16	5
19–20 September	PBS	29	29	7	12	9	-	14	Tie
5–8 September	TNS OBOP	27	31	5	14	7	5	11	4
14–19 August	CBOS	25	22	6	13	10	4	19	3
8–17 August	TNS OBOP	28	28	5	14	7	5	13	Tie
15–16 August	PBS	29.1	28.3	7.1	13.9	5.7	3.8	12.5	0.8
16–21 July	CBOS	20	31	9	13	6	3	18	11
18–19 July	PBS	30	27	7	15	8	3	10	3
17–23 June	CBOS	25	24	8	15	7	3	18	1
20–21 June	PBS	33	29	6	14	5	5	8	4
6–9 June	TNS OBOP	30	24	7	13	8	6	12	6
20–28 May	CBOS	27	27	8	12	6	4	16	Tie
16–17 May	PBS	31	31	6	14	3	-	9	Tie
8–11 May	TNS OBOP	30	24	6	13	7	6	14	6
16–21 April	CBOS	30	24	8	14	8	3	14	6
18–19 April	PBS	30	30	9	14	6	-	11	Tie
4–7 April	TNS OBOP	27	28	8	12	9	5	11	1
12–17 March	CBOS	29	21	6	14	10	5	15	8
14–15 March	PBS	32	26	8	16	8	4	6	6
7–10 March	TNS OBOP	28	28	5	15	7	4	13	Tie
19–24 February	CBOS	32	25	6	15	8	5	9	7
14–15 February	PBS	29	29	8	15	6	4	4	Tie
7–10 February	TNS OBOP	33	26	7	11	9	4	10	7
February	Demoskop	28	25	8	13	6	5	15	3
16–20 January	CBOS	28	27	8	15	7	3	11	1
10–13 January	TNS OBOP	34	25	7	14	6	4	10	9
10–11 January	PBS	32	32	7	14	6	5	4	Tie

=== 1997 ===
Dates of Polling	Polling Firm/Link	AWS	SLD	UP	UW	PSL	ROP	SRP	Others/Undecided	Lead
6–7 December	PBS	32	28	7	16	5	4	-	8	4
December	TNS OBOP	35	24	8	13	6	4	-	10	11
15–16 November	PBS	36	25	6	16	5	4	-	8	11
November	TNS OBOP	40	20	4	15	7	4	-	10	20
21 September 1997	Election results	33.8	27.1	4.7	13.4	7.3	5.6	0.1	8	6.7

=== Seat projections ===
Date	Polling firm	AWS	SLD	UP	UW	PSL	ROP	SRP	PO	PiS	LPR	MN	Others
23 September 2001	Election results	0	216		0	42	2 (Note: The Movement for Reconstruction of Poland did not run lists in this election, but two of its members were elected from the League of Polish Families' lists.)	53	65	44	36	2	0
19–20 September	TNS OBOP	0	239		0	60	0	43	69	36	11	2	0
18 September	TNS OBOP	0	220		0	64	0	44	79	40	11	2	0
September	PBS	34	244		19	43	0	16	74	29	0	1	0
13–14 September	TNS OBOP	0	259		0	60	0	10	78	42	9	2	0
8–11 September	TNS OBOP	0	279		0	49	0	19	70	41	0	2	0
4 September	TNS OBOP	39	271		0	44	0	0	65	39	0	2	0
30 August	TNS OBOP	43	250		0	63	0	0	61	41	0	2	0
19–22 August	TNS OBOP	43	245		0	60	0	0	69	41	0	2	0
15–16 August	TNS OBOP	43	249		0	61	0	0	78	27	0	2	0
2–5 August	TNS OBOP	0	270		0	85	0	0	64	41	0	0	0
26–29 July	TNS OBOP	0	275		0	64	0	0	80	41	0	0	0
19–22 July	TNS OBOP	49	241		0	69	0	0	79	22	0	0	0
7–9 July	TNS OBOP	0	229		20	84	0	0	90	37	0	0	0
23–25 June	TNS OBOP	0	250		0	64	0	0	103	43	0	0	0
9–11 June	TNS OBOP	0	278		0	64	0	0	69	49	0	0	0
26–28 May	TNS OBOP	37	215		0	64	w. AWS	0	95	49	0	0	0
20 May	OBW	56	234		13	57	0	0	96	0	0	2	0
12–14 May	TNS OBOP	43	224		0	85	0	0	108	0	0	0	0
21–23 April	TNS OBOP	67	231		12	66	0	0	84	0	0	0	0
24–26 March	TNS OBOP	53	234		0	69	0	0	104	0	0	0	0
10–12 March	TNS OBOP	44	239		0	63	0	0	102	0	0	0	12
10–12 February	TNS OBOP	31	252		0	59	0	0	118	0	0	0	0
21 September 1997	Election results	201	164	0	60	27	6	0	0	0	0	2	0

== Senate ==
Date	Polling firm	SLD	UP	Senate 2001	PSL	SRP	LPR	Others	Lead
23 September 2001	Election results	38,7%		24,3%	13,5%	4,3%	4,1%	15,1%	14,4% over Senate 2001
19–20 September	TNS OBOP	43%		25%	12%	10%	7%	3%	18% over Senate 2001
18 September	TNS OBOP	43%		25%	12%	8%	7%	5%	18% over Senate 2001
13–14 September	TNS OBOP	46%		25%	12%	5%	7%	5%	21% over Senate 2001
8–11 September	TNS OBOP	49%		24%	11%	5%	5%	6%	25% over Senate 2001
6–7 September	TNS OBOP	46%		24%	15%	3%	6%	6%	22% over Senate 2001
4 September	TNS OBOP	49%		22%	15%	2%	5%	7%	27% over Senate 2001
