= Opinion polling for the 1997 Polish parliamentary election =

Opinion polling was carried out prior to the September 1997 parliamentary elections in Poland. CBOS polling showed a lead for Solidarity Electoral Action (AWS) in late 1996 and early 1997, but a lead for Democratic Left Alliance (SLD) in the months immediately before the elections. The AWS ultimately emerged as the largest party in the elections, leading by a margin of 7%.

== Graphical summary ==
Graphical summary of opinion polls: Solidarity Electoral Action Democratic Left Alliance Freedom Union Polish People's Party Movement for Reconstruction of Poland Labour Union National Party of Retirees and Pensioners Bloc for Poland Confederation of Independent Poland (Note: Contested election under the Solidarity Electoral Action (Polish: Akcja Wyborcza Solidarność) alliance.) Nonpartisan Bloc for Support of Reforms (Note: Contested election under the National–Christian–Democratic Bloc for Poland (Polish: Narodowo–Chrześcijańsko–Demokratyczny Blok dla Polski) alliance.) Solidarity

== Poll results ==
=== 1997 ===
Dates of Polling	Polling Firm/Link	SLD	PSL	UW	UP	BBWR	AWS	ROP	KPEiR	Others/Undecided	Lead
21 September 1997	Election results	27.1	7.3	13.4	4.7	1.4	33.8	5.6	2.2	4.5	6.7
21 September 1997	Exit polls PBS/ "Rz"	26.53	7.90	13.95	4.43	0.75	34.15	5.33	2.58	4.38	7.62
6–9 September 1997	OBOP	26	9	14	5	3	22	8	5	8	4
26 August-1 September 1997	CBOS	22	8	10	5	2	21	5	5	22	1
21–25 August 1997	OBOP	26	10	11	6	2	27	7	7	4	1
24–30 July 1997	CBOS	24	9	6	4	1	23	4	5	25	1
26–29 June 1997	OBOP	23	9	13	9	2	25	9	7	3	2
21–22 June 1997	PBS/ "Rz"	28	10	11	9	-	25	6	8	6	3
13–17 June 1997	CBOS	26	8	7	8	1	21	5	7	17	5
13–15 June 1997	OBOP	20	11	11	7	3	25	7	12	4	5
7–8 June 1997	PBS/ "Rz"	25	9	12	9	-	26	8	7	4	1
15–19 May 1997	CBOS	24	10	8	8	2	22	5	7	14	2
17–18 May 1997	PBS/ "Rz"	24	9	13	10	-	25	7	6	6	1
8–11 May 1997	OBOP	24	10	9	5	2	24	12	10	4	Tie
26–27 April 1997	PBS/ "Rz"	25	9	11	10	-	27	8	7	3	2
12–19 April 1997	PBS/ "Rz"	29	9	14	7	-	27	6	7	1	2
11–15 April 1997	CBOS	23	7	8	5	1	26	5	7	16	3
5–8 April 1997	OBOP	25	10	11	4	3	23	11	8	5	2
22–29 March 1997	PBS/ "Rz"	25	12	12	10	-	29	10	-	3	4
13–18 March 1997	CBOS	23	10	8	5	1	24	6	5	18	1
8–11 March 1997	OBOP	23	12	12	5	4	20	13	6	5	3
8–9 March 1997	PBS/ "Rz"	26	12	12	9	-	29	8	-	4	3
22–23 February 1997	PBS/ "Rz"	29	10	12	11	-	26	8	-	4	3
14–17 February 1997	CBOS	22	10	8	8	1	24	6	3	18	2
8–11 February 1997	OBOP	22	12	12	6	2	29	10	4	3	7
8–9 February 1997	PBS/ "Rz"	26	15	10	9	-	26	10	-	4	Tie
17–21 January 1997	CBOS	20	10	4	5	4	25	8	6	18	5
18–19 January 1997	PBS/ "Rz"	29	10	11	8	-	29	9	-	4	Tie
9–12 January 1997	OBOP	25	12	7	6	0	29	16	-	5	4

=== 1996 ===
Dates of Polling	Polling Firm/Link	SLD	PSL	UW	UP	KPN	BBWR	AWS	ROP	KPEiR	Others/Undecided	Lead
12–17 December 1996	CBOS	18	12	8	8	w. AWS	2	23	8	3	16	5
14–15 December 1996	PBS/ "Rz"	28	11	13	10	w. AWS	-	26	9	-	3	2
7–10 December 1996	OBOP	16	12	10	5	w. AWS	2	19	10	-	26	3
16–19 November 1996	OBOP	20	11	10	4	w. AWS	2	19	11	-	23	1
15–19 November 1996	CBOS	22	11	7	7	w. AWS	1	26	8	5	13	4
19–22 October 1996	OBOP	19	10	8	6	w. AWS	-	21	12	-	24	2
11–15 October 1996	CBOS	23	12	7	8	w. AWS	4	20	9	-	17	3
21–24 September 1996	OBOP	19	12	9	5	w. AWS	-	23	11	-	21	4
12–17 September 1996	CBOS	22	15	8	9	w. AWS	-	21	7	-	18	1
23–27 August 1996	OBOP	21	10	6	4	w. AWS	-	21	14	-	24	Tie
22–27 August 1996	CBOS	23	14	9	6	w. AWS	-	18	12	-	16	5
12–17 July 1996	CBOS	22	14	8	5	w. AWS	-	26	13	-	12	4
12–16 July 1996	OBOP	24	10	6	4	w. AWS	1	15	13	-	27	9
21–25 June 1996 (Note: The poll includes two alternative scenarios: a) SLD – 23, ROP – 13, SO – 11, PSL – 9, UW – 6, UP – 3, others – 35, b) Coalition of AWS and ROP – 27, SLD – 22, PSL – 10, UW – 6, UP – 4, others – 31.)	OBOP	24	9	6	4	w. AWS	1	17	13	-	26	7
14–18 June 1996	CBOS	18	14	11	4	3	2	14	16	-	18	2
8 June 1996	Creation of Solidarity Electoral Action announced											
May 1996	CBOS	24	13	8	5	3	1	14	10	-	22	10
18–21 May 1996	OBOP	24	9	8	5	2	3	10	11	-	28	13
9–13 May 1996	CBOS	23	12	8	5	3	2	10	13	-	24	10
April 1996	CBOS	19	10	8	5	1	2	14	15	-	26	4
13–16 April 1996	OBOP	20	12	10	4	2	2	13	8	-	29	7
11–15 April 1996 (Note: The question included names of parties and names of their leaders.)	CBOS	19	11	6	5	3	1	13	10	-	32	6
11–15 April 1996 (Note: The question included names of parties only.)	CBOS	24	15	8	7	4	2	14	7	-	19	9
9–12 March 1996	OBOP	22	9	9	3	2	3	15	12	-	25	7
7–12 March 1996	CBOS	24	11	10	5	2	1	10	9	-	28	13
7–12 March 1996	CBOS	24	15	8	5	4	4	16	3	-	21	8
10–13 February 1996	OBOP	22	10	10	3	4	2	11	9	-	29	11
9–13 February 1996	CBOS	28	9	8	4	4	3	15	6	-	23	13
2–6 February 1996	CBOS	26	10	10	6	3	3	15	4	-	23	11
20–23 January 1996	OBOP	21	8	10	4	3	2	11	9	-	32	10
12–16 January 1996	CBOS	28	10	8	7	3	5	12	4	-	23	16

=== 1995 ===
Dates of Polling	Polling Firm/Link	SLD	PSL	UW	UP	KPN	BBWR	"S"	ROP	Others/Undecided	Lead
December 1995	OBOP	25	7	8	3	3	6	10	8	30	15
December 1995	CBOS	25	7	11	6	3	5	15	-	28	10
November 1995	CBOS	24	6	8	8	3	5	14	-	32	10
24–26 November 1995	OBOP	30	5	10	3	4	5	9	8	26	20
6–10 October 1995	CBOS	21	9	8	9	2	5	16	-	30	5
September 1995	CBOS	18	10	10	8	1	5	12	-	36	6
September 1995	CBOS	16	11	7	10	3	4	10	-	39	5
August 1995	CBOS	21	9	6	9	3	8	10	-	34	11
24 June-3 July 1995	OBOP	23	11	9	6	3	4	9	-	35	12
June 1995	OBOP	22	10	10	5	4	3	9	-	37	12
8–12 June 1995	CBOS	21	13	11	10	4	5	13	-	23	8
29 May 1995	CBOS	23	12	13	12	5	5	11	-	19	10
13–16 May 1995	OBOP	25	8	9	7	4	3	6	-	38	16
10 May 1995	CBOS	22	12	14	11	2	5	11	-	23	8
7–11 April 1995	CBOS	20	15	13	10	3	4	11	-	24	5
1–4 April 1995	OBOP	22	12	12	5	4	2	8	-	35	10
30 March-3 April 1995	CBOS	23	12	13	10	4	5	11	-	22	10
March 1995	CBOS	24	11	11	12	4	5	10	-	23	12
3–7 March 1995	OBOP	21	13	11	11	6	2	5	-	31	8
February 1995	CBOS	21	17	11	9	4	6	7	-	25	4
3–6 February 1995	OBOP	19	12	11	8	5	5	7	-	33	7
January 1995	CBOS	19	14	13	10	3	5	12	-	24	5

=== 1994 ===
Dates of Polling	Polling Firm/Link	SLD	PSL	UW	UP	KPN	BBWR	"S"	Others/Undecided	Lead
December 1994	CBOS	18	14	13	10	4	6	12	23	4
9–13 December 1994	OBOP	19	19	9	7	3	5	7	31	Tie
18–22 November 1994	OBOP	15	21	10	5	6	4	4	35	6
3–7 November 1994	CBOS	23	15	11	11	3	6	8	23	8
October 1994	CBOS	20	17	10	10	3	4	10	26	3
1–4 October 1994	OBOP	17	24	11	5	5	6	7	25	7
2–6 September 1994	OBOP	19	22	9	7	4	5	6	28	3
2–5 September 1994	CBOS	22	20	8	8	4	6	8	24	5
July 1994	CBOS	20	15	13	9	3	6	7	27	5
15–19 July 1994	OBOP	24	19	11	8	3	9	4	22	5
June 1994	CBOS	21	16	13	9	3	9	7	22	5
May 1994	CBOS	16	18	12	8	6	5	7	28	2
20–24 May 1994	OBOP	14	17	8	7	3	5	3	43	3
6–10 May 1994	OBOP	14	19	10	6	3	6	6	36	5
19 September 1993	Election results	20.4	15.4	14.6 (Note: The sum of results of UD (10.6) and KLD (4.0) parties which merged in April 1994 and formed the UW.)	7.3	5.8	5.4	4.9	26.2	5.0
