= Union of War Veterans =

Union of War Veterans Polish: Związek Weteranów Wojny
- Abbreviation: ZWW
- Leader: Mieczysław Janosz
- Secretary: Stanisław Bastowski
- Founded: 2000
- Registered: 2001
- Headquarters: 43-300 Bielsko-Biała, Stojałowskiego 22
- Membership (2001): ~5,000
- Ideology: Veterans interests Polish nationalism National Democracy
- Religion: Roman Catholic
- National affiliation: SRP

The Union of War Veterans (Polish: Związek Weteranów Wojny, ZWW) is a Polish political party founded in 2000 and registered in 2001 in Bielsko-Biała. It was founded by Mieczysław Janosz, a former member of the Association of Polish Victims of the Third Reich (Polish: Stowarzyszenie Polaków Poszkodowanych przez III Rzeszę). The main goal of the party is to enforce payment of reparations to the Polish veterans and survivors of the World War II from the German government, demanding payment of 50,000 Deutschmarks per every document victim. The party functioned alongside Janosz's Association of War Victims (SOW), and both organizations had ties with the National Democracy movement in Poland.

== History ==
The founder of the party was Mieczysław Janosz, who was a member of the Association of Polish Victims of the Third Reich, an organization founded in 1989. On 1 September 1990, Janosz founded his own association in Oświęcim together with Alfons Klafkowski, the Association of War Victims (Polish: Stowarzyszenie Ofiar Wojny, SOW), which had gathered almost 22,000 members. A few years after, Janosz was accused of making antisemitic and chauvinistic remarks, and was expelled from the Association of Polish Victims of the Third Reich.

In the 1990s, Janosz was known for having connections with the National Democracy (endecja) movements, and ran in the 1989 Polish parliamentary election from the electoral list of the revived National Party. He won 9,300 votes (2.53 %) in Bielsko Voivodeship, and did not win a seat. Janosz and the SOW were associated with Bolesław Tejkowski and his Polish National Community (Polish: Polska Wspólnota Narodowa, WPN) party.

Janosz got involved with the far-left party Self-Defence of the Republic of Poland (Samoobrona) shortly before the 1993 Polish parliamentary election. Samoobrona participated in the election with an anti-capitalist slogan "Poland, you have become a spoil of international finance". Janosz was to be on Samoobrona's electoral lists for the Senate in the election, but his candidacy was reported too late. Around that time, Janosz also founded the International Slavic Forum (Polish: Międzynarodowe Forum Słowiańskie), which had ties with the Communist Party of the Russian Federation.

In 1998, Janosz was involved in the Auschwitz cross controversy, where he protected the crosses from removal by authorities together with Kazimierz Świtoń and Leszek Bubel.

In 2000, Jarosz founded the Union of War Veterans as a political party. The main goal of the party is to arrange fair compensations for survivors and veterans of World War II. The party argued that the rightful amount of compensation would be 50,000 Deutschmarks for every victim. The amount was based on the calculations and legal preparation made by Klafkowski, an associate of Jarosz and a co-founder of SOW, who died in 1992.

In 2001, the ZWW organized the "Congress of Unions and Associations of Slavic War Veterans" in Spodek, which was attended by about 4,000 people. During the meeting, the party authorities also addressed other topics - they condemned the NATO intervention in Yugoslavia and submitted an appeal for the release of Slobodan Milosevic. During the meeting, Janosz also reportedly insulted the German government officials and criticized the Polish minister of finance Andrzej Olechowski for signing agreements with foreign companies that were unfavourable to the Polish population.

The party ran on the electoral list of Samoobrona in the 2001 Polish parliamentary election, fielding one candidate; the party's candidate won 1,457 votes in total, and did not gain a seat.

The party continued to function and promote the interests of Polish veterans and WWII survivors after 2001. In 2002, the party created the Bank of Slavic War Victims (Polish: Bank Słowiańskich Ofiar Wojny) with headquarters in Bielsko-Biała, Belgrade and Moscow. The bank offered to provide a "first share certificate" worth 73,996 PLN for a single-time payment of 100 PLN; some accused the bank of being a fraud scheme and reported the procedure as a crime, but Polish authorities refused to take the case.

The party registered an electoral committee for the 2005 Polish parliamentary election, managed by party members Jan Wysocki and Katarzyna Górna. However, the party did not field any candidates.

The party has not carried out any electoral activities since 2005.

After 2006, the party also became associated with the Slavic Union.

== Ideology ==
The Union of War Veterans promotes the rights of the WWII Polish veterans, with its main priority being the vindication of reparation payments from Germany. The party argues that every document victim of the Third Reich is entitled to a payment of 50,000 Deutschmarks. In 2001, the party estimated that there were about 10 million people eligible to receiving the compensation. The party does not have a budget, and instead sustains itself from "contributions in the form of services provided free of charge to the party by individuals".

The party is hostile towards Germany and the German government, and also heavily criticized Andrzej Olechowski of the Civic Platform for unfavourable contracts with foreign companies such as Fiat. The ZWW rejects efforts of German-Polish reconciliation, and argues that the Polish government did not manage to receive any kind of fair compensation from Germany. According to the party's founder, any Pole that suffered some kind of loss during the war can join the party, as long as the damage is documented. Some of the party's statements were criticized as ultranationalist, antisemitic, and supportive of ethnic hatred. The ZWW also made religious appeals, with the party leader, Mieczysław Janosz, calling himself the "defender of the papal cross".

The German newspaper Nord-Bayerische Nachrichten described the Union of War Veterans as such: "A radical right-wing organisation, whose chairman makes no secret of his anti-Semitic and anti-German views." The ZWW is associated with the neoendek political circles, and expressed views that align with this movement. Janos called for a merger of Slavic nations; the party also called for the release of Yugoslav President Slobodan Milosevic, and condemned the NATO bombing of Yugoslavia. The party also argues that 'the Slavs suffered from the Germans as much as the Jews'. Janosz also has ties with the Communist Party of the Russian Federation.

== Electoral performance ==
=== Sejm ===
Election	Votes	%	Seats	+/–
2001	1,457	0.01	0 / 460	New
2001	As part of the Self-Defence of the Republic of Poland, which won 53 seats.			

== See also ==
- Self-Defence of the Republic of Poland
- League and Self-Defence
- National Party "Fatherland"
- Confederation of Independent Poland
- League of Polish Families
- Social Justice Movement
- Polish Confederation – Dignity and Work
