= Elżbieta Polak =

Polish politician (born 1959)

Elżbieta Anna Polak
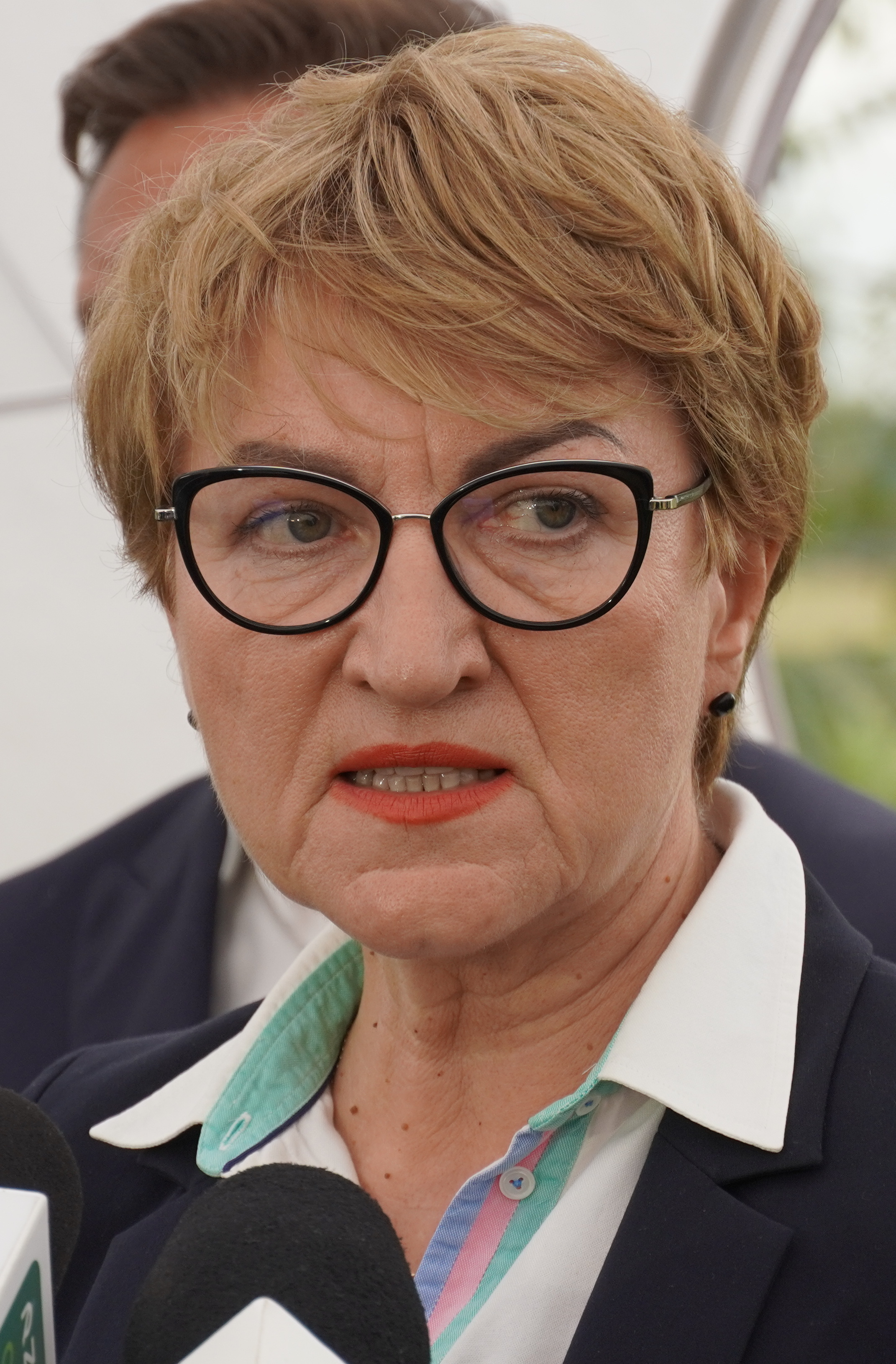

Member of the Sejm
- Incumbent
- Assumed office 13 November 2023

Marshal of Lubusz Voivodeship
- In office 29 November 2010 – 13 October 2023
- Preceded by: Marcin Jabłoński
- Succeeded by: Marcin Jabłoński

Personal details
- Born: 6 September 1959 (age 67) Przemków, Poland
- Party: Freedom Union (1997-2003); Civic Platform (2003-)
- Education: University of Wroclaw
- Awards: Order of Polonia Restituta

Elżbieta Anna Polak (born 6 September 1959 in Przemków, Poland) is a Polish politician from the Civic Platform who served as the Marshal of Lubusz Voivodeship from November 2010 to October 2023.

In the 2023 Polish parliamentary election she was elected to the Sejm from Zielona Góra.
