= Marian Krzaklewski =

Polish politician

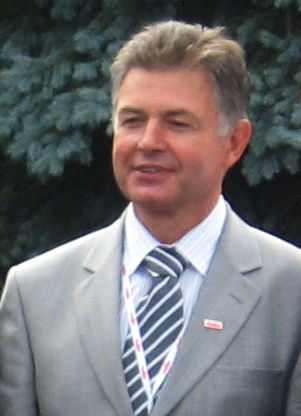
- Krzaklewski in 2007

Member of the Sejm
- In office 20 October 1997 – 18 October 2001

Personal details
- Born: 23 August 1950 (age 75) Kolbuszowa, Poland
- Party: Solidarity Electoral Action
- Other political affiliations: Civic Platform (2009)

Marian Krzaklewski (Note: Polish pronunciation: [ˈmarjan kʂaˈklɛfskʲi]) (born 23 August 1950) is a Polish politician. A member of Solidarity since the 1980s, he was one of the most known and influential Polish politicians in the late 1990s, when he created the Solidarity Electoral Action (AWS). The AWS coalition, especially when it joined forces with Freedom Union, was a major accomplishment in Polish politics, transforming the fragmented post-Solidarity camp into a powerful political force.

Krzaklewski studied information science from Politechnika Śląska and holds a PhD degree. In 1980 he became involved with Solidarity, the famous Polish anti-communist trade union and social movement. Within the movement he was active in the Silesia region.

In 1991, he replaced Lech Wałęsa (then president of Poland) as the chairman of Solidarity. In opposition both to the government of Wałęsa and later the centre-left SLD, he was one of the founders of the center and right-wing Solidarity Electoral Action, which eventually became victorious in the 1997 Polish parliamentary election. Krzaklewski, who was elected as a deputy to the Polish parliament (Sejm), was considered for the post of Prime Minister, however in the end the post went to Jerzy Buzek. Amid the decreasing support for AWS, political infighting and corruption (TKM), he contested the 2000 Polish presidential election. As the major right-wing candidate, he polled very poorly, achieving just 15.6% of the vote. (Incumbent Kwasniewski won a majority in the first round). Subsequently, AWS suffered a crushing defeat in the 2001 Polish parliamentary election.

Krzaklewski resigned as the leader of AWS in 2001 and was replaced as chairman of the Solidarity trade Union by Janusz Śniadek in 2002. He remained a member of the trade union's National Commission until his retirement in 2017. In 2004, Krzaklewski became Poland's representative of the European Economic and Social Committee.

In the 2009 European Parliament election, Krzaklewski unsuccessfully ran for a seat in the Rzeszów constituency under the Civic Platform list.
