= 2001 Polish parliamentary election =

- 23 September 2001
- Opinion polls
- Registered: 29,364,455
- Sejm

All 460 seats in the Sejm 231 seats needed for a majority
- Turnout: 13,559,412 (46.29%) ▼1.64pp
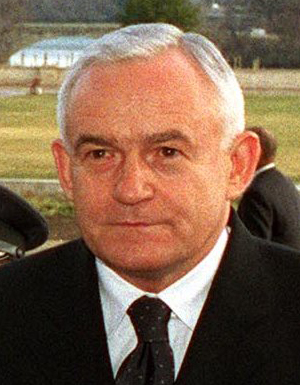

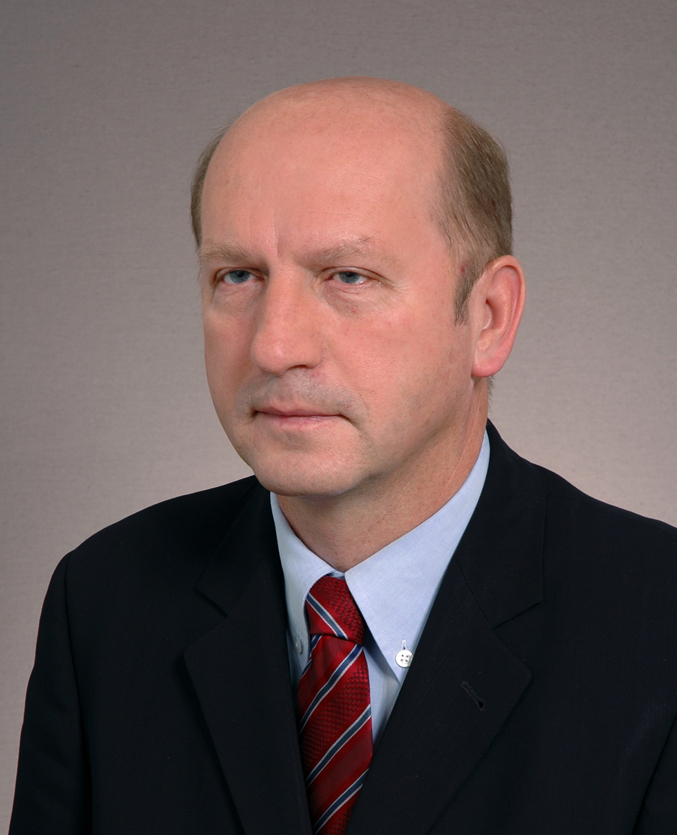

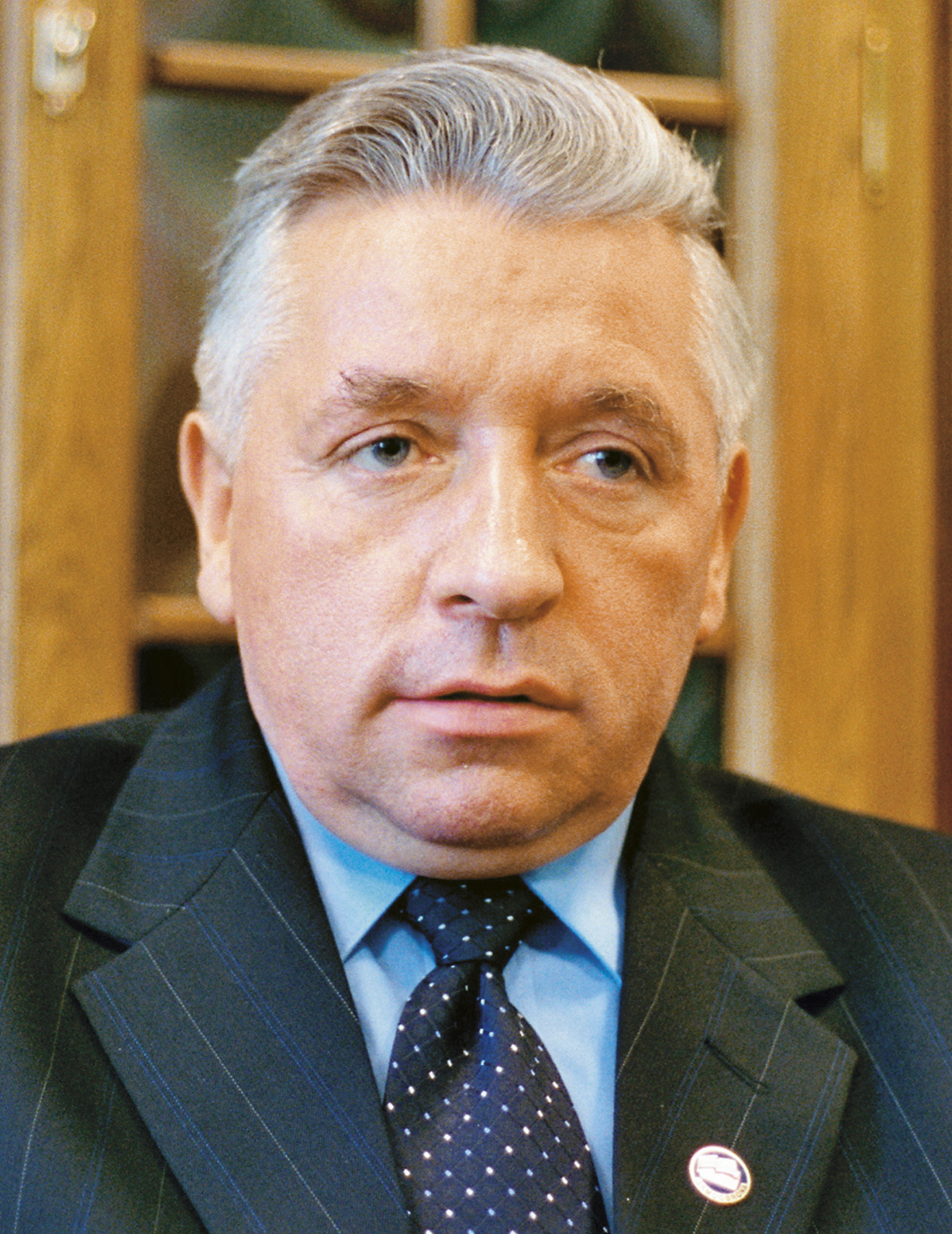

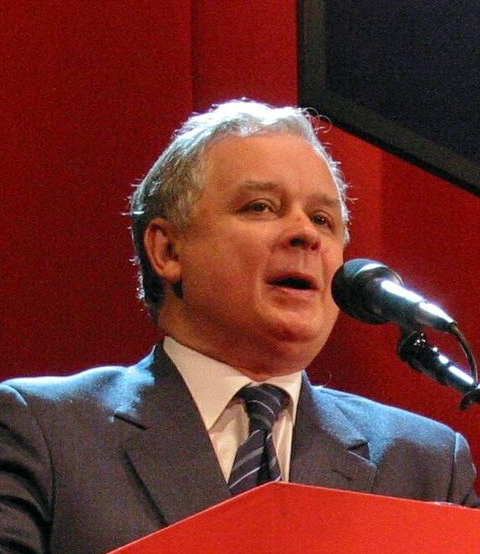

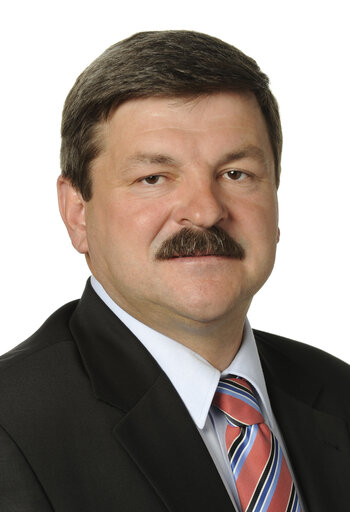

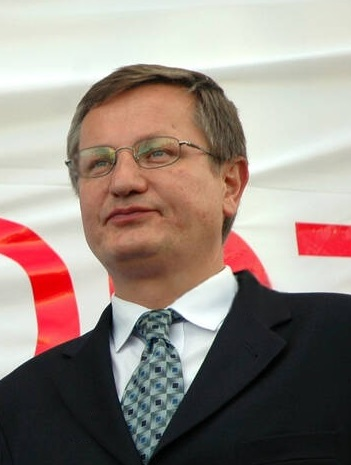
	Majority party	Minority party	Third party
Leader	Leszek Miller	Maciej Płażyński	Andrzej Lepper
Party	SLD-UP	PO	SRP
Leader since	15 April 1999	19 January 2001 (Note: Płażyński was the leading candidate of Civic Platform and the party's co-founder, but was not party leader until October 2001.)	10 January 1992
Last election	34.1%, 164 seats	Did not exist	0.1%, 0 seats
Seats won	216	65	53
Seat change	▲52	New	▲53
Popular vote	5,342,519	1,651,099	1,327,624
Percentage	41.0%	12.7%	10.2%
Swing	▲6.9 pp	New	▲10.1 pp
	Fourth party	Fifth party	Sixth party
Leader	Lech Kaczyński	Jarosław Kalinowski	Marek Kotlinowski
Party	PiS	PSL	LPR
Leader since	13 June 2001	11 October 1997	5 May 2001
Last election	Did not exist	7.3%, 27 seats	Did not exist
Seats won	44	42	38
Seat change	New	▲15	New
Popular vote	1,236,787	1,168,659	1,025,148
Percentage	9.5%	9.0%	7.9%
Swing	New	▲1.7 pp	New
- Senate
- All 100 seats in the Senate; 51 seats needed for a majority
- Turnout: 13,551,502 (46.15%) ▼1.68pp
Party	Vote %	Seats	+/–
SLD-UP	38.91	75	+47
Senate 2001	24.42	15	New
PSL	13.21	4	+1
SRP	4.28	2	+2
LPR	4.05	2	New
Independents	10.76	2	−3
This lists parties that won seats. See the complete results below.

Government before	Government after election
Buzek cabinet AWS	Miller cabinet SLD—PSL—UP

Parliamentary elections were held in Poland on 23 September 2001. All 460 members of the Sejm and 100 senators of the Senate were elected. The election concluded with an overwhelming victory for the centre-left Democratic Left Alliance – Labor Union, the electoral coalition between the Democratic Left Alliance (SLD) and the Labour Union (UP), which captured 41% of the vote in the crucial lower house Sejm. The 2001 election is recognized as marking the emergence of both Civic Platform (PO) and Law and Justice (PiS) as players in Polish politics, while also witnessing the outright collapse of the Solidarity Electoral Action (AWS) and its former coalition partner, the Freedom Union (UW).

Voter turnout for the 2001 election was 46% The 2001 election featured heavy redistricting owing to local government reforms passed in 1998. For this election only, list seats were allocated using the Sainte-Laguë method instead of the D'Hondt method.

== Background ==
At the end of its four-year term, the ruling AWS government of Prime Minister Jerzy Buzek faced bleak prospects for the September parliamentary election. In the previous presidential election in 2000, the SLD's Aleksander Kwaśniewski achieved a landslide reelection over AWS candidate Marian Krzaklewski. Economically, Polish consumer confidence dropped to its lowest since the mid-1990s, with unemployment rising above 16%. Politically, the Buzek government faced a series of crises undermining its credibility. In May 2000, the AWS' junior coalition partner, the Freedom Union, walked out of the government regarding the party's objections to the slow pace of reform, forcing Buzek to set up a relatively weak minority government in its place. Later in July 2001, Buzek's government was again hit by three further ministerial resignations over corruption charges, while the government's reform program for pensions and health care grounded to a halt in the Sejm.

In light of Buzek's besieged administration, opposition parties took advantage of AWS' organisational and economic weaknesses. From the centre left, a political coalition between the Democratic Left Alliance (SLD) and the Labour Union (UP), headed by Leszek Miller, appeared as the ruling government's most formidable, united and vocal opposition. On the centre right, Solidarity's traditional spectrum of support increasingly became divided by the emergence of new political groups. Civic Platform (PO), composed of former AWS and UW members, repeated calls for a low flat-rate income tax and a culling of bureaucracy to attract investment. Further down the right, the Law and Justice party (PiS), composed of AWS' more conservative and anti-communist adherents, campaigned on promises of tough anti-corruption and organised crime legislation.

The campaign leading up to the September election was marred by voter apathy due to the summer holidays, and was also marginalized by the September 11 attacks in the United States.

=== Campaign spending ===
Party	2001		2024 equivalent	
Party	Spent	Cost	Spent	Cost
SLD-UP	26,995,002	5,05	13,500,029	2,53
PO	16,319,018	9,88	8,161,037	4,94
SRP	1,862,470	1,40	931,409	0,70
PiS	5,302,842	4,29	2,651,917	2,14
PSL	9,409,950	8,05	4,705,856	4,03
LPR	514,841	0,50	257,468	0,25
Source: Dudek

== Opinion polls ==
Graphical summary of opinion polls: Democratic Left Alliance – Labour Union Civic Platform Self-Defence Law and Justice Polish People's Party League of Polish Families Solidarity Electoral Action Freedom Union Democratic Left Alliance (Note: Contested election under the Democratic Left Alliance – Labour Union (Polish: Sojusz Lewicy Demokratycznej–Unia Pracy) alliance.) Labour Union Movement for Reconstruction of Poland (Note: Contested election in the lists of the League of Polish Families.)

== Results ==
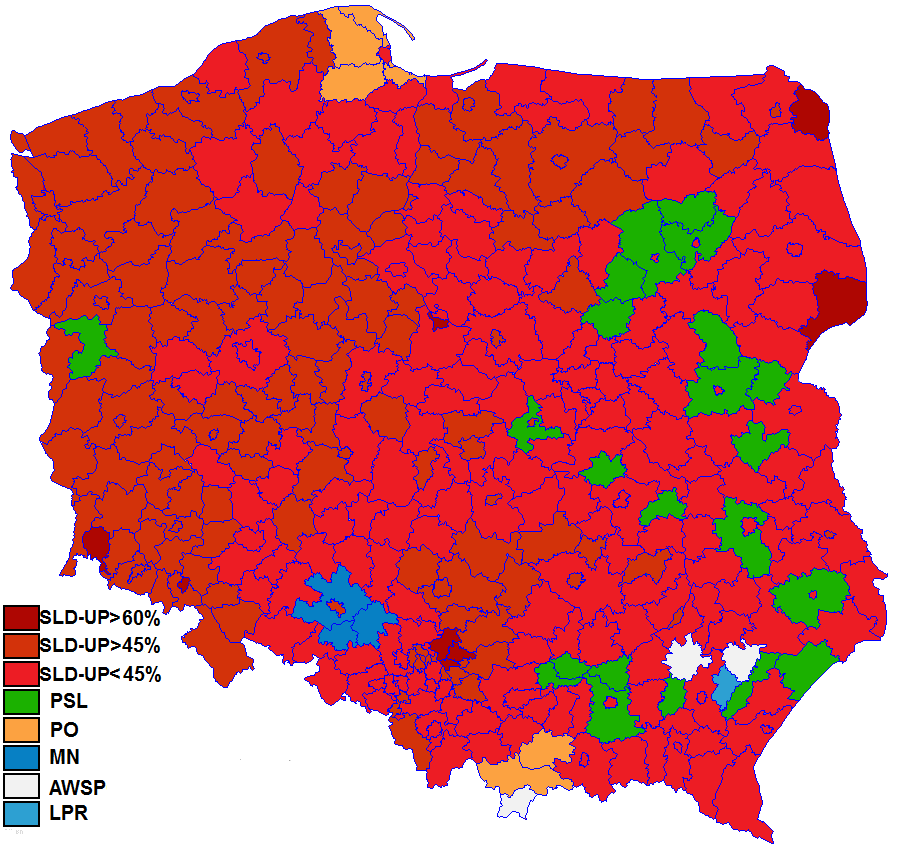
Powiats with party majority ■ – Democratic Left Alliance ■ – Polish People's Party ■ – Civic Platform ■ – Solidarity Electoral Action ■ – League of Polish Families ■ – German Minority

Results of the Sejm election, showing vote strength by electoral district. SLD won a plurality in all 41 constituencies.

The SLD triumphed in the final tally, receiving 41% percent of the vote, though shy of an outright parliamentary majority in the Sejm. The party increased its representation by 52 seats, earning it 216 representatives, and returned to the Chancellery after a four-year period of sitting in opposition. Partly due to the fractious nature of its opponents, the SLD secured pluralities in all of Poland's voivodeships as well as in an overwhelming majority of the nation's powiats. On the centre right, Civic Platform entered parliament for the first time, coming in second place with nearly 13% of the vote. The party stood relatively strong in Pomeranian Voivodeship.

Law and Justice (PiS), headed by Lech Kaczyński, a former Minister of Justice in the Buzek government, scored 44 seats and 9.5% of the vote, also securing his party's entrance into the Sejm for the first time. The Polish People's Party (PSL) won 42 seats, slightly reversing the party's devastating losses from 1997. The PSL would later enter into coalition with the SLD to achieve a parliamentary majority.

Nationalist parties also performed well in the election's final results. The left-wing nationalist Self-Defence of the Republic of Poland (SRP) increased its vote 100-fold from the 1997 election, securing 53 seats and 10% of the vote, coming in third place. Headed by populist Andrzej Lepper, the party campaigned against Warsaw excess and Poland's ongoing negotiations to enter the European Union. On the far right, the League of Polish Families, which campaigned on a staunchly Catholic and anti-EU platform, also entered the Sejm for the first time, gaining 38 seats and 8% of the vote.

The election proved catastrophic for Solidarity Electoral Action and its former coalition partner, Freedom Union. Both parties failed to secure the 8% for coalitions and 5% for standalone parties threshold to enter the Sejm, with AWS and UW falling to 5.6% and 3.1%, respectively. In the election's aftermath, Prime Minister Buzek tendered his resignation. Both the AWS and UW faced political extinction following the election's aftermath. The AWS dissolved itself by the end of 2001; the UW lingered until its own dissolution in 2005.

=== Sejm ===
Party	Votes	%	Seats	+/–
Democratic Left Alliance – Labour Union	5,342,519	41.04	216	+52
Civic Platform	1,651,099	12.68	65	New
Self-Defence of the Republic of Poland	1,327,624	10.20	53	+53
Law and Justice	1,236,787	9.50	44	New
Polish People's Party	1,168,659	8.98	42	+15
League of Polish Families	1,025,148	7.87	38	+38
Solidarity of the Right Electoral Action	729,207	5.60	0	–201
Freedom Union	404,074	3.10	0	–60
Alternative Social Movement	54,266	0.42	0	–
German Minority	47,230	0.36	2	0
Polish Socialist Party	13,459	0.10	0	New
German Minority of Upper Silesia	8,024	0.06	0	New
Polish Economic Union	7,189	0.06	0	New
Polish National Commonwealth	2,644	0.02	0	0
Total	13,017,929	100.00	460	0
Valid votes	13,017,929	96.01		
Invalid/blank votes	541,483	3.99		
Total votes	13,559,412	100.00		
Registered voters/turnout	29,364,455	46.18		
Source: National Electoral Commission

==== Party breakdown ====
Party or alliance		Votes	%	Seats
Democratic Left Alliance – Labour Union	Democratic Left Alliance	4,250,991	32.65	174
Democratic Left Alliance – Labour Union	Labour Union (Note: Includes 51,557 votes and 3 seats for supported independents.)	333,356	2.56	16
Democratic Left Alliance – Labour Union	Democratic People's Party	61,336	0.47	2
Democratic Left Alliance – Labour Union	National Party of Retirees and Pensioners	49,799	0.38	1
Democratic Left Alliance – Labour Union	Alliance of Democrats	30,404	0.23	1
Democratic Left Alliance – Labour Union	Independents	616,261	4.73	22
Democratic Left Alliance – Labour Union	Crossed out	372	0.00	0
Democratic Left Alliance – Labour Union	Total	5,342,519	41.04	216
Civic Platform	Conservative People's Party	336,862	2.59	17
Civic Platform	Real Politics Union	62,639	0.48	0
Civic Platform	Polish Christian Democratic Agreement	14,449	0.11	1
Civic Platform	Freedom Union	5,022	0.04	0
Civic Platform	Movement of the One Hundred	4,026	0.03	0
Civic Platform	Solidarity Electoral Action	3,119	0.02	0
Civic Platform	Christian Democracy of the Third Polish Republic	2,937	0.02	0
Civic Platform	Self-Government Forum	1,514	0.01	0
Civic Platform	Christian National Union	715	0.01	0
Civic Platform	Republicans of the Republic	238	0.00	0
Civic Platform	Independents	1,218,580	9.36	47
Civic Platform	Crossed out	998	0.01	0
Civic Platform	Total	1,651,099	12.68	65
Self-Defence of the Republic of Poland	Self-Defence of the Republic of Poland	1,134,797	8.72	45
Self-Defence of the Republic of Poland	Forum of Retirees and Pensioners	21,840	0.17	1
Self-Defence of the Republic of Poland	Polish People's Party	9,653	0.07	1
Self-Defence of the Republic of Poland	Union of War Veterans	1,457	0.01	0
Self-Defence of the Republic of Poland	Democratic Left Alliance	969	0.01	0
Self-Defence of the Republic of Poland	Independents	158,908	1.22	6
Self-Defence of the Republic of Poland	Total	1,327,624	10.20	53
Law and Justice	Law and Justice (Note: Includes 298,104 votes and 11 seats for supported independents.)	664,536	5.10	24
Law and Justice	Right Alliance	311,370	2.39	16
Law and Justice	Labour Party	15,830	0.12	0
Law and Justice	Centre Agreement	15,471	0.12	0
Law and Justice	Movement for Reconstruction of Poland	11,350	0.09	0
Law and Justice	Solidarity Electoral Action	4,739	0.04	0
Law and Justice	Conservative People's Party	3,451	0.03	0
Law and Justice	Christian National Union	911	0.01	0
Law and Justice	Real Politics Union	760	0.01	0
Law and Justice	Polish Christian Democratic Agreement	490	0.00	0
Law and Justice	Independents	207,300	1.59	4
Law and Justice	Crossed out	579	0.00	0
Law and Justice	Total	1,236,787	9.50	44
Polish People's Party	Polish People's Party (Note: Includes 110,563 votes and 1 seat for supported independents.)	1,010,998	7.77	36
Polish People's Party	Bloc for Poland	9,498	0.07	1
Polish People's Party	Polish State Reason Faction	8,886	0.07	1
Polish People's Party	National Party	2,116	0.02	0
Polish People's Party	Greens of the Republic of Poland	1,706	0.01	0
Polish People's Party	Polish Party of Engineers and Technicians	918	0.01	0
Polish People's Party	Alliance of Democrats	151	0.00	0
Polish People's Party	Independents	134,215	1.03	4
Polish People's Party	Crossed out	171	0.00	0
Polish People's Party	Total	1,168,659	8.98	42
League of Polish Families	Polish Agreement (Note: Includes 19,489 votes and 0 seats for supported independents.)	166,948	1.28	8
League of Polish Families	National-Catholic Movement (Note: Includes 281 votes and 0 seats for supported independents.)	91,092	0.70	5
League of Polish Families	National Party	67,668	0.52	4
League of Polish Families	Movement for Reconstruction of Poland	59,102	0.45	2
League of Polish Families	Popular National Alliance	38,756	0.30	1
League of Polish Families	League of Polish Families	33,867	0.26	1
League of Polish Families	Solidarity Electoral Action	6,614	0.05	0
League of Polish Families	Alliance for Poland	4,945	0.04	0
League of Polish Families	Polish League	4,628	0.04	0
League of Polish Families	Peasants' Agreement	2,290	0.02	0
League of Polish Families	Patrimony	1,708	0.01	0
League of Polish Families	Labour Party	1,614	0.01	0
League of Polish Families	Christian National Union	902	0.01	0
League of Polish Families	SKChO	816	0.01	0
League of Polish Families	Confederation of Independent Poland	539	0.00	0
League of Polish Families	All-Polish Youth	482	0.00	0
League of Polish Families	Merchant Party	433	0.00	0
League of Polish Families	Polish Christian Democratic Agreement	390	0.00	0
League of Polish Families	Independents	542,354	4.17	17
League of Polish Families	Total	1,025,148	7.87	38
Solidarity of the Right Electoral Action	Solidarity Electoral Action (Note: Includes 19,242 votes and 0 seats for supported independents.)	371,588	2.85	0
Solidarity of the Right Electoral Action	Christian National Union (Note: Includes 13,664 votes and 0 seats for supported independents.)	125,443	0.96	0
Solidarity of the Right Electoral Action	Polish Christian Democratic Agreement (Note: Includes 5,254 votes and 0 seats for supported independents.)	115,621	0.89	0
Solidarity of the Right Electoral Action	Confederation of Independent Poland	9,253	0.07	0
Solidarity of the Right Electoral Action	Polish People's Party (Mikołajczykowskie)	2,660	0.02	0
Solidarity of the Right Electoral Action	Christian Democracy of the Third Polish Republic	208	0.00	0
Solidarity of the Right Electoral Action	Movement for Reconstruction of Poland	198	0.00	0
Solidarity of the Right Electoral Action	Independents	104,236	0.80	0
Solidarity of the Right Electoral Action	Total	729,207	5.60	0
Freedom Union	Freedom Union (Note: Includes 156 votes and 0 seats for supported independents.)	349,531	2.68	0
Freedom Union	Independents	54,543	0.42	0
Freedom Union	Total	404,074	3.10	0
Alternative Social Movement	Alternative Social Movement	16,014	0.12	0
Alternative Social Movement	Confederation of Independent Poland – Fatherland	5,655	0.04	0
Alternative Social Movement	Polish Ecologist Party – of the Greens	1,086	0.01	0
Alternative Social Movement	Alliance of New Forces	613	0.00	0
Alternative Social Movement	Polish People's Party (Mikołajczykowskie)	428	0.00	0
Alternative Social Movement	The Poor of Poland	372	0.00	0
Alternative Social Movement	National Rebirth of Poland	360	0.00	0
Alternative Social Movement	National Party of Retirees and Pensioners	328	0.00	0
Alternative Social Movement	Polish Front	324	0.00	0
Alternative Social Movement	Christian National Union	290	0.00	0
Alternative Social Movement	National Self-Government Agreement "Fatherland"	186	0.00	0
Alternative Social Movement	National Party	145	0.00	0
Alternative Social Movement	Polish League	120	0.00	0
Alternative Social Movement	League of Polish Families	101	0.00	0
Alternative Social Movement	Christian Democracy of the Third Polish Republic	97	0.00	0
Alternative Social Movement	Movement for Reconstruction of Poland	11	0.00	0
Alternative Social Movement	Independents	28,136	0.22	0
Alternative Social Movement	Total	54,266	0.42	0
German Minority	Independents	47,230	0.36	2
Polish Socialist Party	Polish Socialist Party (Note: Includes 532 votes and 0 seats for supported independents.)	8,760	0.07	0
Polish Socialist Party	National Forum of the Left	108	0.00	0
Polish Socialist Party	Independents	4,591	0.04	0
Polish Socialist Party	Total	13,459	0.10	0
German Minority of Upper Silesia	Solidarity Electoral Action	181	0.00	0
German Minority of Upper Silesia	Independents	7,843	0.06	0
German Minority of Upper Silesia	Total	8,024	0.06	0
Polish Economic Union	Polish Economic Union	5,496	0.04	0
Polish Economic Union	Independents	1,693	0.01	0
Polish Economic Union	Total	7,189	0.06	0
Polish National Commonwealth	Polish National Commonwealth (Note: Includes 615 votes and 0 seats for supported independents.)	2,068	0.02	0
Polish National Commonwealth	Polish Workers' People's Party	576	0.00	0
Polish National Commonwealth	Total	2,644	0.02	0
Total		13,017,929	100.00	460
Source: National Electoral Commission

==== By constituency ====
Constituency	Turnout	SLD	PO	SRP	PiS	PSL	LPR	AWSP	UW	MN	Others	Lead
1 – Legnica	43.50	53.69	10.50	9.42	7.03	5.81	5.89	4.07	3.19	-	0.40	43.19
2 – Wałbrzych	43.89	52.68	11.74	10.91	4.67	5.48	6.48	4.24	3.27	-	0.55	40.94
3 – Wrocław	46.92	39.15	17.83	9.51	10.26	4.74	7.86	5.21	5.00	-	0.45	21.32
4 – Bydgoszcz	46.53	50.37	8.97	9.57	7.38	7.85	8.16	4.97	2.27	-	0.46	40.80
5 – Toruń	42.68	47.36	9.59	12.05	6.98	8.86	7.61	4.23	2.64	-	0.67	35.31
6 – Lublin	48.09	34.27	8.48	13.31	9.42	17.27	9.91	4.50	2.18	-	0.66	17.00
7 – Chełm	46.65	34.58	5.91	15.86	5.23	21.38	11.30	3.85	1.49	-	0.40	13.20
8 – Zielona Góra	42.58	51.54	9.81	9.60	5.66	7.49	5.44	5.99	3.36	-	1.10	41.73
9 – Łódź	48.54	52.19	12.10	6.69	9.88	2.35	7.34	5.70	3.22	-	0.52	40.09
10 – Piotrków Trybunalski	44.73	39.70	8.33	15.90	6.32	14.91	7.49	4.80	1.63	-	0.93	23.80
11 – Sieradz	46.17	41.05	7.84	17.76	5.77	13.87	7.51	3.85	1.59	-	0.75	23.29
12 – Chrzanów	48.27	35.24	14.09	8.38	9.87	9.30	11.54	8.16	2.84	-	0.57	21.15
13 – Kraków	50.50	33.67	18.15	6.89	16.03	5.11	9.66	4.39	5.84	-	0.25	15.52
14 – Nowy Sącz	47.95	23.32	19.13	7.98	11.68	10.86	11.44	12.80	2.04	-	0.75	4.19
15 – Tarnów	46.59	25.56	13.77	10.05	9.77	17.40	13.02	7.87	2.22	-	0.33	8.16
16 – Płock	42.11	41.21	7.70	13.04	7.48	17.04	5.67	5.27	1.98	-	0.61	24.17
17 – Radom	43.66	34.38	10.64	13.54	8.00	18.10	7.71	5.47	1.59	-	0.58	16.28
18 – Siedlce	45.65	30.06	7.60	14.19	8.42	22.95	9.67	4.94	1.60	-	0.56	7.11
19 – Warsaw I	56.11	36.77	18.87	3.05	21.57	1.62	7.12	4.02	6.58	-	0.40	15.20
20 – Warsaw II	45.15	30.76	16.05	8.26	18.12	8.95	9.38	4.90	3.15	-	0.45	12.64
21 – Opole	39.83	38.84	11.97	11.01	5.33	5.08	6.62	3.66	3.09	13.62	0.78	25.22
22 – Krosno	47.28	31.62	7.02	12.27	8.79	15.90	11.89	10.29	1.75	-	0.48	15.72
23 – Rzeszów	49.14	31.19	8.86	10.14	8.41	13.78	15.78	9.90	1.36	-	0.58	15.41
24 – Białystok	44.79	37.91	8.42	12.04	11.51	10.96	11.79	4.89	1.87	-	0.61	25.87
25 – Gdańsk	47.56	34.58	25.82	6.38	15.95	3.39	5.90	4.91	2.83	-	0.23	8.76
26 – Gdynia	47.32	36.46	24.92	9.21	9.30	4.96	7.87	4.27	2.69	-	0.32	11.54
27 – Bielsko-Biała	51.06	38.30	13.80	7.91	9.87	5.65	9.83	10.21	3.79	-	0.65	24.50
28 – Częstochowa	46.84	47.03	11.70	10.61	7.89	7.14	5.48	6.99	2.37	-	0.79	35.33
29 – Gliwice	39.26	44.39	13.62	6.09	9.81	3.01	5.48	8.44	5.33	-	3.84	30.77
30 – Rybnik	42.88	40.16	18.04	7.10	9.61	4.15	5.97	7.55	4.23	2.09	1.08	22.12
31 – Katowice	44.90	44.60	16.43	5.55	12.44	2.01	-	13.34	4.60	-	1.03	28.17
32 – Sosnowiec	48.53	62.40	8.45	6.84	6.66	3.86	3.97	4.23	2.71	-	0.86	53.95
33 – Kielce	44.17	45.08	7.16	12.81	6.73	15.07	6.24	3.68	1.80	-	1.41	30.01
34 – Elbląg	42.03	47.89	10.35	12.71	6.36	9.06	6.69	2.72	3.86	-	0.35	35.18
35 – Olsztyn	40.16	47.22	11.64	9.63	7.87	6.94	8.57	3.97	3.48	-	0.67	35.58
36 – Kalisz	49.99	47.31	10.16	12.77	4.06	12.00	7.49	3.75	1.93	-	0.54	34.54
37 – Konin	47.82	48.07	8.88	13.76	4.78	11.33	5.66	5.15	1.80	-	0.56	34.31
38 – Piła	49.12	48.34	10.47	11.74	4.62	10.55	6.64	4.55	2.68	-	0.43	36.60
39 – Poznań	52.27	41.99	20.29	5.08	12.81	2.98	7.22	4.26	4.97	-	0.49	21.70
40 – Koszalin	43.75	47.16	10.15	22.77	3.73	4.11	4.45	4.06	3.01	-	0.56	24.39
41 – Szczecin	43.40	50.58	12.56	10.24	8.28	3.75	5.77	4.24	4.26	-	0.32	38.02
Poland	46.29	41.04	12.68	10.20	9.50	8.98	7.87	5.60	3.10	0.36	0.66	28.36

==== Seat distribution by constituency ====
Constituency	SLD	PO	SRP	PiS	PSL	LPR	MN	Sum
1 – Legnica	7	1	1	1	1	1	-	12
2 – Wałbrzych	6	1	1	-	-	1	-	9
3 – Wrocław	6	3	1	2	1	1	-	14
4 – Bydgoszcz	7	1	1	1	1	1	-	12
5 – Toruń	7	1	2	1	1	1	-	13
6 – Lublin	5	1	2	2	3	2	-	15
7 – Chełm	5	1	2	-	3	1	-	12
8 – Zielona Góra	7	1	1	1	1	1	-	12
9 – Łódź	6	2	1	1	-	1	-	11
10 – Piotrków Trybunalski	4	1	2	-	1	1	-	9
11 – Sieradz	5	1	2	1	2	1	-	12
12 – Chrzanów	3	1	-	1	1	1	-	7
13 – Kraków	5	3	1	2	1	2	-	14
14 – Nowy Sącz	3	2	1	1	1	1	-	9
15 – Tarnów	2	1	1	1	2	1	-	8
16 – Płock	5	1	1	1	2	-	-	10
17 – Radom	3	1	1	1	2	1	-	9
18 – Siedlce	4	1	2	1	3	1	-	12
19 – Warsaw I	8	4	-	5	-	2	-	19
20 – Warsaw II	3	2	1	2	1	1	-	10
21 – Opole	5	2	2	1	-	1	2	13
22 – Krosno	4	1	2	1	2	1	-	11
23 – Rzeszów	5	2	2	1	2	3	-	15
24 – Białystok	6	1	2	2	2	2	-	15
25 – Gdańsk	5	3	1	2	-	1	-	12
26 – Gdynia	6	4	1	1	1	1	-	14
27 – Bielsko-Biała	4	2	1	1	-	1	-	9
28 – Częstochowa	4	1	1	1	-	-	-	7
29 – Gliwice	6	2	1	1	-	-	-	10
30 – Rybnik	5	2	1	1	-	-	-	9
31 – Katowice	7	3	1	2	-	-	-	13
32 – Sosnowiec	7	1	1	-	-	-	-	9
33 – Kielce	8	1	2	1	3	1	-	16
34 – Elbląg	5	1	1	-	1	-	-	8
35 – Olsztyn	5	1	1	1	-	1	-	9
36 – Kalisz	6	1	2	-	2	1	-	12
37 – Konin	5	1	2	-	1	-	-	9
38 – Piła	5	1	1	-	1	1	-	9
39 – Poznań	5	2	-	2	-	1	-	10
40 – Koszalin	5	1	2	-	-	-	-	8
41 – Szczecin	7	2	2	1	-	1	-	13
Total	216	65	53	44	42	38	2	460

=== Senate ===
Party	Votes	%	Seats	+/–
Democratic Left Alliance – Labour Union	10,532,523	38.91	75	+47
Senate 2001	6,610,751	24.42	15	–
Polish People's Party	3,575,388	13.21	4	+1
Self-Defence of the Republic of Poland	1,158,887	4.28	2	–
League of Polish Families	1,097,058	4.05	2	New
Real Politics Union	469,815	1.74	0	0
Alternative Social Movement	296,407	1.10	0	New
Polish Economic Union	146,299	0.54	0	New
KWW Supporters of Lech Kaczyński	142,461	0.53	1	New
German Minority Electoral Committee	138,120	0.51	0	0
Polish Socialist Party	131,987	0.49	0	New
KWW Henryk Stokłosa	113,139	0.42	1	0
Local lists and independents	2,656,284	9.81	0	–5
Total	27,069,119	100.00	100	0
Valid votes	13,072,323	96.46		
Invalid/blank votes	479,179	3.54		
Total votes	13,551,502	100.00		
Registered voters/turnout	29,364,455	46.15		
Source: National Electoral Commission

==== By constituency ====
No.	Constituency	Total seats	Seats won					
No.	Constituency	Total seats	SLD–UP	BS	PSL	SRP	LPR	Others
1	Legnica	3	3					
2	Wałbrzych	2	2					
3	Wrocław	3	3					
4	Bydgoszcz	2	2					
5	Toruń	3	3					
6	Lublin	3	2	1				
7	Chełm	3	1		1		1	
8	Zielona Góra	3	3					
9	Łódź	2	2					
10	Piotrków Trybunalski	2	1			1		
11	Sieradz	3	3					
12	Kraków	4	4					
13	Nowy Sącz	2		2				
14	Tarnów	2	1		1			
15	Płock	2	2					
16	Radom	2	2					
17	Siedlce	3	1		1	1		
18	Warsaw	4	2	2				
19	Warsaw	2		2				
20	Opole	3	2	1				
21	Krosno	2	2					
22	Rzeszów	3	1	2				
23	Białystok	3	2				1	
24	Gdańsk	3	1	1				1
25	Gdynia	3	2	1				
26	Bielsko-Biała	2	1	1				
27	Częstochowa	2	2					
28	Gliwice	2	1	1				
29	Rybnik	2	2					
30	Katowice	3	2	1				
31	Sosnowiec	2	2					
32	Kielce	3	3					
33	Elbląg	2	2					
34	Olsztyn	2	2					
35	Kalisz	3	3					
36	Konin	2	2					
37	Piła	2	1					1
38	Poznań	2	1		1			
39	Koszalin	2	2					
40	Szczecin	2	2					
Total		100	75	15	4	2	2	2
Source: National Electoral Commission

== Notes ==
- Obwieszczenie Państwowej Komisji Wyborczej z dn. 26 IX 1997 r., Monitor Polski. Nr 109, poz. 1186
- Obwieszczenie PKW z dn. 26 IX 2001 r., Dz.U. Nr 109, poz. 1187
