= Senate 2001 =

Senate 2001 Coalition Blok Senat 2001
- Leader: Krzysztof Piesiewicz
- Founder: Kazimierz Kutz Krzysztof Piesiewicz; Zbigniew Religa Zbigniew Romaszewski
- Founded: 2001
- Dissolved: 2001
- Ideology: Conservative liberalism Christian democracy Internal factions: • National conservatism • Conservatism • Liberal conservatism • Centrism • Liberalism • Social conservatism • Libertarianism
- Political position: Centre-right
- Senate (2001): 15 / 100

The Senate 2001 bloc (Polish: Blok Senat 2001) was an electoral alliance in Poland used by centre-right parties in the election to the Senate in 2001. It included post-Solidarity Electoral Action parties, who aimed to prevent domination of the Senate by the centre-left Democratic Left Alliance – Labor Union (SLD-UP). All of the component parties competed in the concurrent election to the Sejm separately (the Movement for the Reconstruction of Poland ran on the ticket of the League of Polish Families).

The parties involved in the alliance were:

- Solidarity Electoral Action (coalition of RS AWS, Agreement of Polish Christian Democrats and Christian National Union), a Christian democratic alliance led by Jerzy Buzek
- Law and Justice (with Right Alliance), a national conservative party led by Lech Kaczyński
- Civic Platform (with Real Politics Union and Conservative-People's Party), a liberal conservative party led by Maciej Płażyński
- Movement for Reconstruction of Poland, a conservative party led by Jan Olszewski
- Freedom Union, a classical liberal party led by Władysław Frasyniuk

Pre-election polling put the alliance on 30 to 40 seats. However, in the event, it won only 15 seats to the SLD-UP's 75. The alliance remained as a caucus in the Senate until the 2005 election, but didn't run for any other office. Law and Justice and Civic Platform continued cooperation also during 2002 local elections as POPiS coalition.

The size of the caucus entitled the party to one member, Edmund Wittbrodt, of the Convention on the Future of Europe. Two of its members, Wittbrodt and Andrzej Chronowski, served as MEPs for three months after accession in 2004, before elections could be held.

== See also ==
- POPiS
- Senate Pact 2023
