= Polish Christian Democratic Agreement =

Polish Christian Democratic Agreement Porozumienie Polskich Chrześcijańskich Demokratów
- Leader: Antoni Tokarczuk
- Founded: 26 September 1999
- Dissolved: 13 January 2002
- Preceded by: Party of Christian Democrats; Movement for the Republic
- Succeeded by: Conservative People's Party - New Poland Movement
- Headquarters: Constitution Square 2, 00-552, Warsaw
- Youth wing: Forum Młodych Chrześcijańskich Demokratów
- Ideology: Christian democracy
- Religion: Roman Catholic

Website
- www.ppchd.org.pl (archive)

The Polish Christian Democratic Agreement (Polish: Porozumienie Polskich Chrześcijańskich Demokratów, PPChD) was a Christian-democratic political party in Poland.

== History ==
The PPChD was formed in September 1999 by the merger of the bigger faction of the Centre Agreement and two minor parties affiliated to the Solidarity Electoral Action coalition: the Party of Christian Democrats and the Movement for the Republic. Antoni Tokarczuk was elected president of the PPChD and he would be soon appointed to the office of the Minister of the Environment in the cabinet of Jerzy Buzek. Janusz Steinhoff, Minister of Economy, also joined the party. Other leaders included Paweł Łączkowski, Krzysztof Tchórzewski, Andrzej Kozioł, Jan Rejczak, Mieczysław Gil and Teresa Liszcz.

In January 2001 the Solidarity Electoral Action became a federation and the PPChD became one of its member parties. In the 2001 parliamentary election the coalition failed to cross the 8% electoral threshold for coalitions, thus the PPChD lost its representation in the Sejm.

In January 2002 the PPChD was merged into the Conservative People's Party. By then, most former members of the Center Agreement had joined Law and Justice.
