= Alliance for Poland =

Alliance for Poland Przymierze dla Polski
- Leader: Gabriel Janowski
- Founded: 8 April 2001
- Dissolved: 29 May 2014
- Headquarters: ul. Wspólna 65a/31 00-687 Warsaw
- Ideology: Euroscepticism; National conservatism Solidarism; Agrarianism
- Political position: Right-wing

Alliance for Poland (Polish: Przymierze dla Polski) was a right-wing Polish political party led by Gabriel Janowski. It was registered on 8 April 2001 and dissolved on 29 May 2014.
