= Stanisław Gogacz =

Polish politician (born 1959)

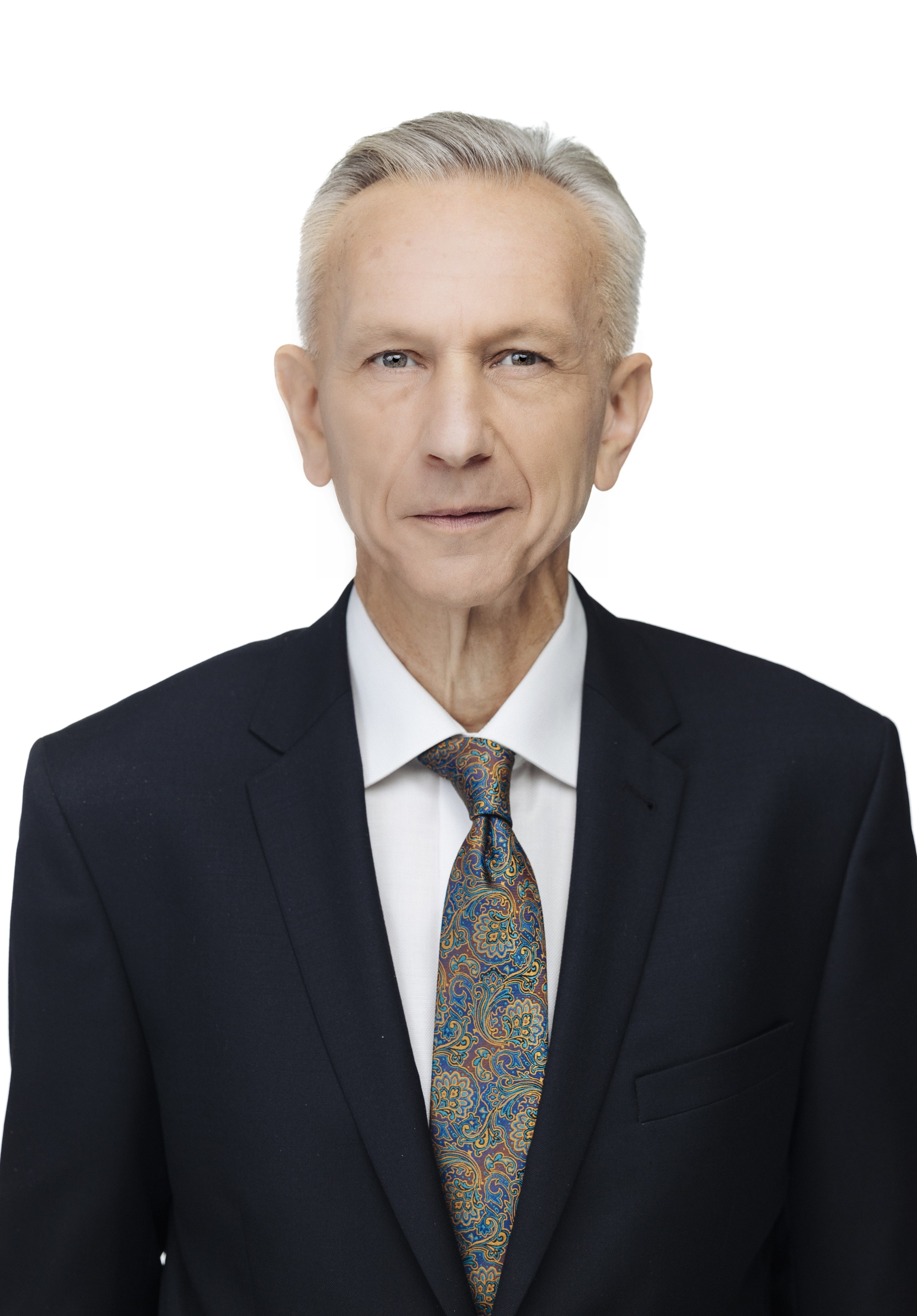
Stanisław Gogacz in 2023

Stanisław Gogacz (born 1 November 1959) is a Polish politician. He was elected to the Senate of Poland (10th term) representing the constituency of Lublin.
