= Solidarity Electoral Action =

Solidarity Electoral Action Akcja Wyborcza Solidarność (Polish)
- Leader: Marian Krzaklewski (1996–2000); Jerzy Buzek (2000–2001)
- Founded: 8 June 1996; 30 years ago
- Dissolved: 18 October 2001
- Preceded by: Solidarity Citizens' Committee; Centre Civic Alliance; Solidarity lists
- Ideology: Christian democracy Conservatism; Anti-communism
- Political position: Centre-right
- Religion: Catholicism
- Colours: Red (official); Gray (customary)
- Sejm (1997): 201 / 460

Website
- www.aws.org.pl (archived)

Solidarity Electoral Action (Polish: Akcja Wyborcza Solidarność, AWS) was a coalition of political parties in Poland, active from 1996 to 2001. AWS was the political arm of the Solidarity trade union, whose leader Lech Wałęsa (also an AWS member), was President of Poland from 1990 to 1995, and the successor of the parties emerged from the fragmentation of the Solidarity Citizens' Committee.

The coalition was led by Marian Krzaklewski and Jerzy Buzek, who was Prime Minister of Poland from 1997 to 2001. Ideologically, it represented "an eclectic mix of socially conservative trade union-oriented corporatism, Christian Democracy, economically interventionist and liberal forms of Catholic nationalism and less overtly Church-inspired strands of liberal-conservatism"; its program was also described as a combination of "social conservatism and state interventionism".

Law and Justice and Civic Coalition, the two dominant Polish political parties of today, had their roots in AWS.

== History ==
On June 8, 1996, at the initiative of the NSZZ "Solidarność" trade union, the "Solidarność" Electoral Action was established as a coalition of over 30 Christian-democratic, conservative and liberal political parties, mostly from the Solidarity Citizens' Committee, the Solidarity trade union's political wing. Among them, there were the Christian National Union, the Party of Christian Democrats, the Centre Agreement, the Conservative People's Party (formed in January 1997), the Peasants' Agreement, the Movement for the Republic (until 1997), the Nonpartisan Bloc for Support of Reforms (until 1997) and the Confederation of Independent Poland (until 1998 and again since 2001). AWS's founding leader was Marian Krzaklewski, who was also the leader of the Solidarity trade union, having succeeded to Lech Wałęsa in 1991. The formation of the AWS was a response to public expectations for a broad social movement that would unite the Polish right wing. The AWS was composed of right-wing parties, trade unions, associations, and non-governmental organizations originating from the Solidarity movement.

In the 1997 parliamentary election, the AWS obtained 33.8% of the vote, 201 members of the Sejm and 51 of the Senate. After the election, AWS' member Jerzy Buzek formed a coalition government, which comprised also the liberal Freedom Union.

In December 1997, a new party, Social Movement (RS), was formed. It was joined by Krzaklewski, Buzek and several other non-party independents recommended by the Solidarity trade union and/or former members of the Solidarity Citizens' Committee. Consequently, the Social Movement soon became the largest faction within the coalition. The other factions were those associated with the Christian National Union, the Party of Christian Democrats and the Conservative People's Party. In 1998, the Confederation of Independent Poland and a group that would form the Polish Agreement were excluded from the coalition. From these groups, the League of Polish Families would later be formed. In 1999, the Party of Christian Democrats, the Centre Agreement and the Movement for the Republic merged into the Polish Christian Democratic Agreement.

Reforms relating to domestic affairs, the entry to NATO in 1999 and the accession process to the European Union led to conflicts within the coalition.

In June 2000, the Freedom Union broke its alliance with the AWS and Buzek continued to govern at the head of a minority government.

In the 2000 presidential election, Krzaklewski was AWS' official candidate and won 15.6% of the vote, but a large chunk of the coalition, especially activists from the more liberal Conservative People's Party, had supported the independent candidate Andrzej Olechowski, who won 17.3% of the vote. As a result, Aleksander Kwaśniewski of the post-communist Democratic Left Alliance was elected president; Krzaklewski resigned from his position of AWS leader in December 2000 and was replaced by Buzek in January 2001.

Also in January 2001, AWS became a federation comprising the Solidarity trade union, the Social Movement, the Christian National Union, the Polish Christian Democratic Agreement and the Conservative People's Party. However, in March 2001 the Conservative People's Party withdrew from the AWS and most of it would later join Civic Platform, which had been established in January 2001 by Olechowski, AWS splinter Maciej Płażyński and Freedom Union's Donald Tusk. More importantly, in May the Solidarity trade union withdrew too. In June most of the structure of the Centre Agreement, which was originally a member of the AWS, along with right-wing dissidents from other AWS constituent parties formed Law and Justice, under the leadership of Jarosław Kaczyński and Lech Kaczyński. Between May and July the AWS had included the Movement for Reconstruction of Poland, which would later be associated with the League of Polish Families.

In the 2001 parliamentary election, the AWS was formed mainly of four components: the Social Movement, the Christian National Union, the Polish Christian Democratic Agreement and the Confederation of Independent Poland. The coalition won 5.6% and no seats, as the electoral threshold was 8%.

Most of the remaining AWS members later joined either Civic Platform (these included both Krzaklewski and Buzek; the latter has been a member of the European Parliament since 2004 and was its President in 2009–2012) or Law and Justice. In 2002, the Polish Christian Democratic Agreement was merged into what remained of the Conservative People's Party. In 2004 the latter and the Social Movement were replaced by the Centre Party. The Conservative People's Party was revived in 2007 and lasted until 2014, when it became part of Poland Together. The Christian National Union, most of whose members had joined the League of Polish Families, was active until 2010. Poland Together was transformed into Agreement in 2017.

== International relations ==
The International Republican Institute, a United States federal government-funded organisation loosely associated with the United States Republican Party, claims credit for having played a major role in uniting the different political parties which came together to create the AWS. It claims to have provided training in political campaigning, communications training and research which helped organise and create the AWS. It also states that once the AWS was in government, it organised an advertising campaign for the Polish government in order to stop the AWS splitting up over internal tensions: "IRI initiated a post-election program that emphasized media and communications training for Prime Minister Jerzy Buzek's chancellory and cabinet".

== Election results ==
=== Presidential ===
Election	Candidate	1st round		2nd round	
Election	Candidate	# of overall votes	% of overall vote	# of overall votes	% of overall vote
2000	Marian Krzaklewski	2,739,621	15.6 (#3)		

=== Sejm ===
Election	Leader	# of votes	% of vote	# of overall seats won	+/-	Government
1997	Marian Krzaklewski	4,427,373	33.8 (#1)	201 / 460	New	AWS-UW (1997-2000)
1997	Marian Krzaklewski	4,427,373	33.8 (#1)	201 / 460	New	AWS minority (2000-2001)
2001	Jerzy Buzek	729,207	5.6 (#7)	0 / 460	▼201	Extra-parliamentary

=== Senate ===
Election	# of overall seats won	+/–
1997	51 / 100	New
2001	7 / 100	▼44
2001	As part of the Senate 2001 coalition, which won 15 seats.	

=== Regional assemblies ===
Election	% of vote	# of overall seats won	+/–
1998	33.3 (#1)	342 / 855	New
2002	3.4 (#6)	17 / 561	▼325

== See also ==
- POPiS
- Senate 2001
