= Civic Platform =

Political party in Poland (2001–2025)

Civic Platform of the Republic of Poland Platforma Obywatelska Rzeczypospolitej Polskiej
- Abbreviation: PO
- Chairman: Maciej Płażyński (first); Donald Tusk (last)
- Founders: Donald Tusk; Andrzej Olechowski; Maciej Płażyński
- Founded: 24 January 2001; 25 years ago
- Dissolved: 25 October 2025; 12 months ago
- Split from: Solidarity Electoral Action; Freedom Union; Conservative People's Party
- Merged into: Civic Coalition (party)
- Headquarters: ul. Wiejska 12A, 00-490 Warsaw
- Membership (2025): ~25,000
- Ideology: Liberal conservatism; Christian democracy; Pro-Europeanism
- Political position: Centre-right
- National affiliation: Civic Coalition; Senate 2001 (2001); POPiS (2002); Senate Pact 2023 (2023)
- European affiliation: European People's Party
- European Parliament group: European People's Party Group
- Colours: Orange; Blue

Website
- platforma.org

The Civic Platform (Polish: Platforma Obywatelska, PO) (Note: The party was officially the Civic Platform of the Republic of Poland (Platforma Obywatelska Rzeczypospolitej Polskiej).) was a centre-right liberal conservative political party in Poland. The party's most prominent leader was Donald Tusk, party chairman between 2003–2014 and 2021–2025.

It was formed in 2001 by splinter factions from the Solidarity Electoral Action, the Freedom Union and the Conservative People's Party, and it later placed second in the 2001 Polish parliamentary election. It remained at the opposition until the 2007 Polish parliamentary opposition, when it overtook Law and Justice, won 209 seats, and Tusk was elected as Prime Minister of Poland. Following the Smolensk air disaster in 2010, Bronisław Komorowski served as acting president of Poland and later won the 2010 Polish presidential election. Tusk continued to serve as prime minister and leader of Civic Platform until he resigned in 2014 to assume the post of the president of the European Council. The party was defeated in the 2015 Polish parliamentary and presidential elections. It placed second in the 2019 Polish parliamentary election, and its 2020 Polish presidential election candidate, Rafał Trzaskowski, won 49% of the popular vote in the second round and lost the election to Andrzej Duda.

Initially positioned as a Christian democratic party with strong economically liberal tendencies, it soon adopted liberal conservatism throughout the 2000s. During its time in power, it was aligned with more pragmatic and centrist views, and was characterized as a catch-all party. In the 2010s, the Civic Platform adopted more socially liberal policies, aligned itself with conservative liberalism and economic neoliberalism, and it has since been positioned in the centre-right. It has also strongly advocated for Poland's membership in the European Union and NATO. It was a member of the European People's Party.

The party headed an electoral alliance Civic Coalition, which was founded in 2018. Since its creation, it had shown strong electoral performances in Warsaw, the west, and the north of Poland. Since the 2000s, the Civic Platform had established itself as one of the dominant political parties in Poland. On 25 October 2025, the party merged into a new party called Civic Coalition, bearing the same name as the PO-led electoral coalition from 2018.

== History ==
=== Establishment ===
The Civic Platform was founded in 2001 as economically liberal, Christian-democratic split from existing parties. Founders Andrzej Olechowski, Maciej Płażyński, and Donald Tusk were sometimes jokingly called "the Three Tenors" by Polish media and commentators. Olechowski and Płażyński left the party during the 2001–2005 parliamentary term, leaving Tusk as the sole remaining founder, and current party leader.

=== First elections ===
In the 2001 general election, the party secured 12.6% of the vote and 65 deputies in the Sejm, making it the largest opposition party to the government led by the Democratic Left Alliance (SLD). In the 2002 local elections, PO stood together with Law and Justice in 15 voivodeships (in 14 as POPiS, in Podkarpacie with another centre-right political parties). They stood separately only in Mazovia.

The POPiS coalition won 12% of the popular vote nationally, which was well below the expectations. Ludwik Dorn, the chairman of the PiS parliamentary club at the time, remarked: "Together, we gained as much as the PO itself collected a year earlier." This marked the point at which PO and PiS, until now ideological and political allies, started to grow apart. The leadership of PiS decided that it had to distance itself from PO and change its ideology in order to increase its popular support.

In 2005, PO led all opinion polls with 26% to 30% of public support. However, in the 2005 general election, in which it was led by Jan Rokita, PO polled only 24.1% and unexpectedly came second to the 27% garnered by Law and Justice (PiS). A centre-right coalition of PO and PiS (nicknamed POPiS) was deemed most likely to form a government after the election. Yet the putative coalition parties had a falling out in the wake of the fiercely contested Polish presidential election of 2005.

In the 2005 elections, PiS attacked PO by campaigning on a difference between "liberal Poland" and its "social Poland". The former was marked by economic liberalism, austerity, deregulation and "serving the rich". In contrast, Law and Justice stressed its "social" character, pledging policies that would help the poor. The party attacked Civic Platform's flat tax proposal and advocated a much more active role of the state in the economy. Law and Justice also made "an offer to the left", stressing its economically left-wing policies.

Ultimately, Lech Kaczyński (PiS) won the second round of the presidential election on 23 October 2005 with 54% of the vote, ahead of Tusk, the PO candidate. Due to the demands of PiS for control of all the armed ministries (the Defence Ministry, the Ministry of the Interior and the Ministry of Foreign Affairs) and the office of the prime minister, PO and PiS were unable to form a coalition. Instead, PiS formed a coalition government with the support of the League of Polish Families (LPR) and Self-Defense of the Republic of Poland (SRP). PO became the opposition to this PiS-led coalition government.

=== Ruling government (2007–2015) ===
The PiS-led coalition fell apart in 2007 amid a corruption scandal involving Andrzej Lepper and Tomasz Lipiec and internal leadership disputes. These events led to new elections, and in the 21 October 2007 parliamentary election PO won 41.51% of the popular vote and 209 out of 460 seats in the Sejm and 60 out of 100 seats in the Senate of Poland. Civic Platform, now the largest party in both houses of parliament, subsequently formed a coalition with the Polish People's Party (PSL).

Despite declaring the parliamentary election campaign the will to limit taxation in Poland, the Civic Platform implemented an ideologically diverse set of policies - it increased the excise imposed on diesel oil, alcoholic beverages, tobacco, and oil. It had also eliminated tax exemptions.

At the 2010 Polish presidential election, following the Smolensk air disaster which killed the incumbent Polish president Lech Kaczyński, Tusk decided not to present his candidature, considered an easy possible victory over PiS leader Jarosław Kaczyński. During the PO primary elections, Bronisław Komorowski defeated Foreign Minister Radosław Sikorski. At the polls, Komorowski defeated Jarosław Kaczyński, ensuring PO dominance over the contemporary Polish political landscape.

In November 2010, local elections granted Civic Platform about 30.1 percent of the votes and PiS at 23.2 percent, an increase for the former and a drop for the latter compared to the 2006 elections. PO succeeded in winning four consecutive elections, and Tusk remained as kingmaker. PO's dominance was also a reflection of left-wing weakness and divisions on both sides of the political scene, with PiS suffering a splinter in Autumn 2010. Civic Platform won the plurality of votes in the 9 October 2011 parliamentary election, gaining 39.18% of the popular vote, 207 of 460 seats in the Sejm, and 63 out of 100 seats in the Senate.

In the 2014 European elections, Civic Platform came first place nationally, achieving 32.13% of the vote and returning 19 MEPs. In the 2014 local elections, PO achieved 179 seats, the highest single number. In the 2015 presidential election, PO endorsed Bronisław Komorowski, a former member of PO from 2001 till 2010. He lost the election receiving 48.5% of the popular vote, while Andrzej Duda won with 51.5%.

=== Opposition (2015–2023) ===
In the 2015 parliamentary election, PO came in second place, after PiS, achieving 24.09% of the popular vote, 138 out of 460 seats in the Sejm, and 34 out of 100 seats in the Senate. In the 2018 local elections, PO achieved 26.97% of the votes, coming second after PiS. In the 2019 European elections, PO participated in the European Coalition electoral alliance which achieved 38.47%, coming second after PiS. On 1 October 2023, it held The Million Hearts march in Warsaw.

=== Return to power (2023–2025) and unification ===
The Civic Platform returned to power in a coalition with the Polish People's Party, Poland 2050 and New Left in the 2023 parliamentary election.

In October 2025, the party announced its plans to merge into a new party with two of its smaller coalition partners, Modern and Polish Initiative. The unification convention was held on 25 October 2025, where the three parties merged into a single party known as the Civic Coalition. Some members of the 2018 electoral alliance Civic Coalition, such as the Greens, opted to remain a separate party. The leader of the new party became Donald Tusk, and the new party is to complete its leadership election on 26 January 2026. The creation of Civic Coalition marked the dissolution of the Civic Platform.

== Ideology ==
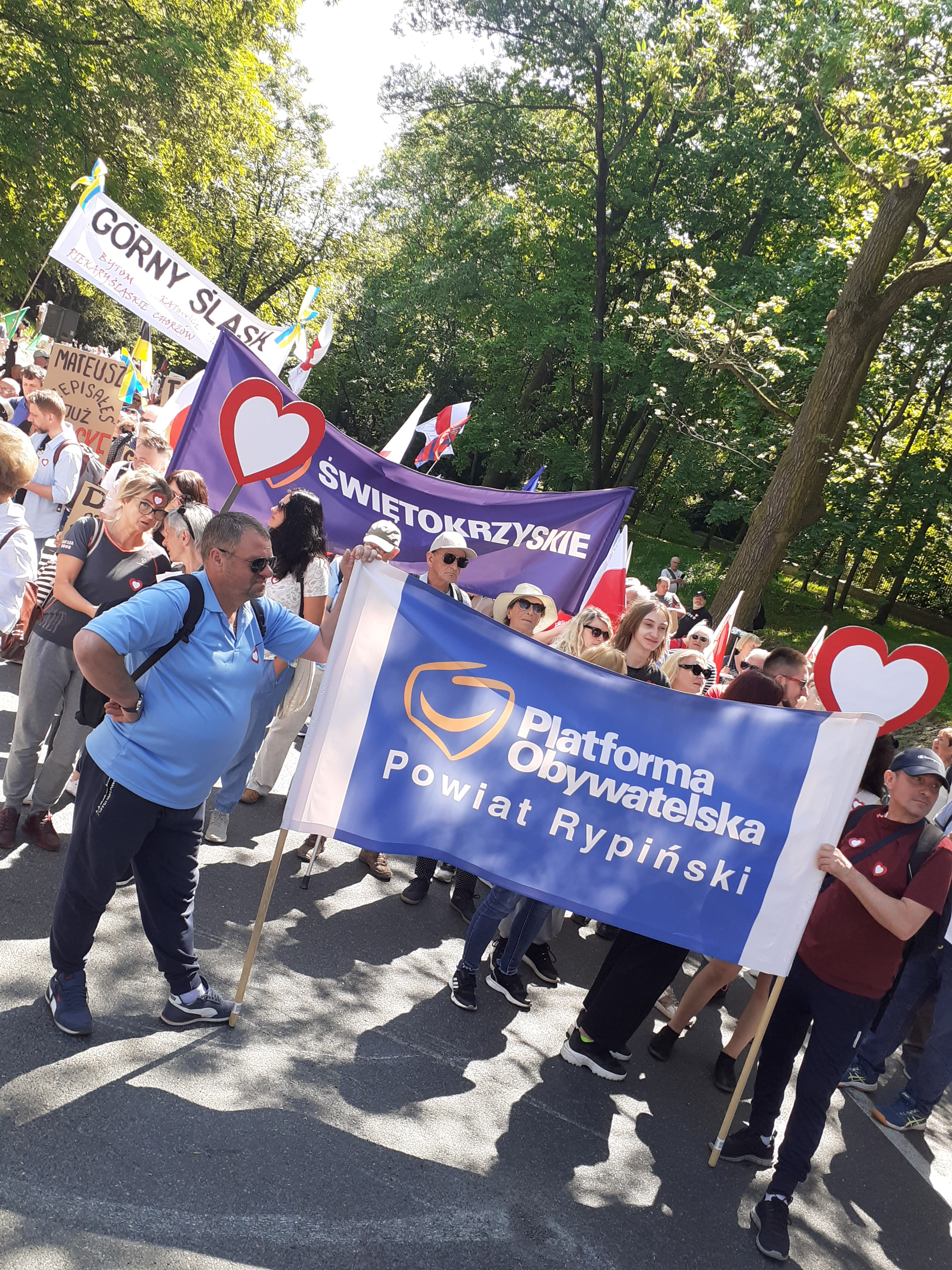
Civic Platform banner carried during the opposition march on 4 June 2023

The Civic Platform was mainly described as a centre-right political party. Due to the peculiarity of Polish politics, as a major liberal opponent of the conservative PiS, the party was also classified as centrist or centre-left, although since 2023 the party was considered to have shifted back towards the centre-right. It has also been described as liberal-conservative, Christian democratic, conservative, conservative-liberal, classical-liberal, liberal, and social-liberal. It was also described as pragmatic and big tent. It supported Poland's membership in the European Union.

Since 2007, when Civic Platform formed the government, the party has gradually moved from its Christian-democratic stances, and many of its politicians hold more liberal positions on social issues. In 2013, the Civic Platform's government introduced public funding of in vitro fertilization program. Civic Platform also supported civil unions for same-sex couples but was against same-sex marriage and the adoption of children by same-sex couples. The party also supported liberalization of the abortion law, which it had opposed while in government. In response to the climate crisis, the Civic Platform pledged to end the use of coal for energy in Poland by 2040.

PO was described as neoliberal, economically liberal, right-wing liberal, and fiscally conservative. It represented moderately conservative positions, and pursued deregulatory economic policies. The Third Cabinet of Donald Tusk led by the Civic Platform pursued economic deregulation, lowering healthcare tax for business, restricting immigration and tax cuts. It also pursued laissez-faire economic policies, such as introducing tax exemptions for self-employed and high earners.

After becoming the biggest opposition party, the Civic Platform became more culturally liberal and populist. This tendency became especially popular among the younger generation of the party's politicians, such as mayor of Warsaw and presidential candidate Rafał Trzaskowski. In contrast, Dan Davison argued that the party's shift on social issues "stem not from any meaningful change in their substantive politics, but rather from cynical triangulation", as "even now, the concessions PO has made to social liberalism are very limited compromises." After returning to the government in 2023, the party adopted an anti-immigration stance to migrants coming from Russia and Belarus.

== Organization ==
=== Party leaders ===
| No. | Image | Chairman | Tenure |
|---|---|---|---|
| 1 | | Maciej Płażyński | 18 October 2001 – 1 June 2003 |
| 2 | | Donald Tusk | 1 June 2003 – 8 November 2014 |
| 3 | | Ewa Kopacz | 8 November 2014 – 26 January 2016 |
| 4 | | Grzegorz Schetyna | 26 January 2016 – 29 January 2020 |
| 5 | | Borys Budka | 29 January 2020 – 3 Jul 2021 |
| 6 | | Donald Tusk | 3 Jul 2021 – 25 October 2025 |

=== Notable politicians ===
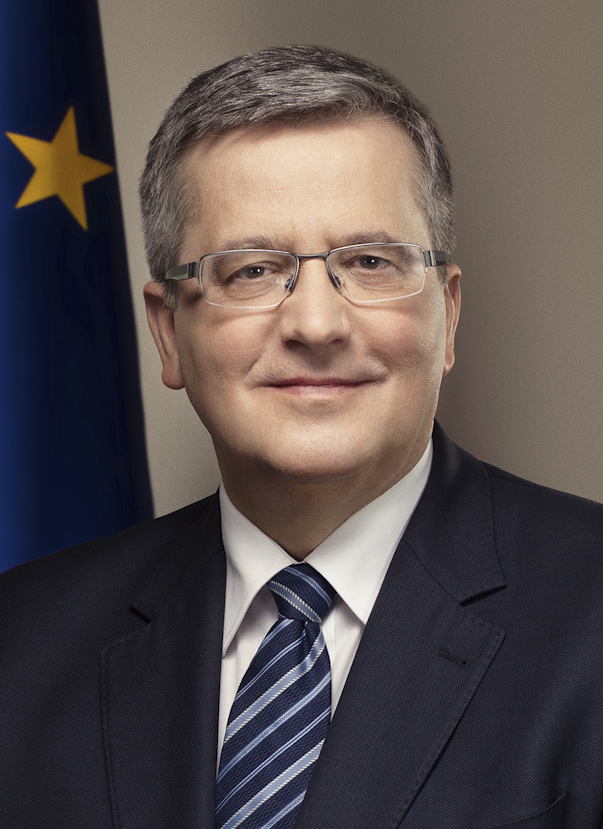
Bronisław Komorowski former president of Poland (2010–2015)

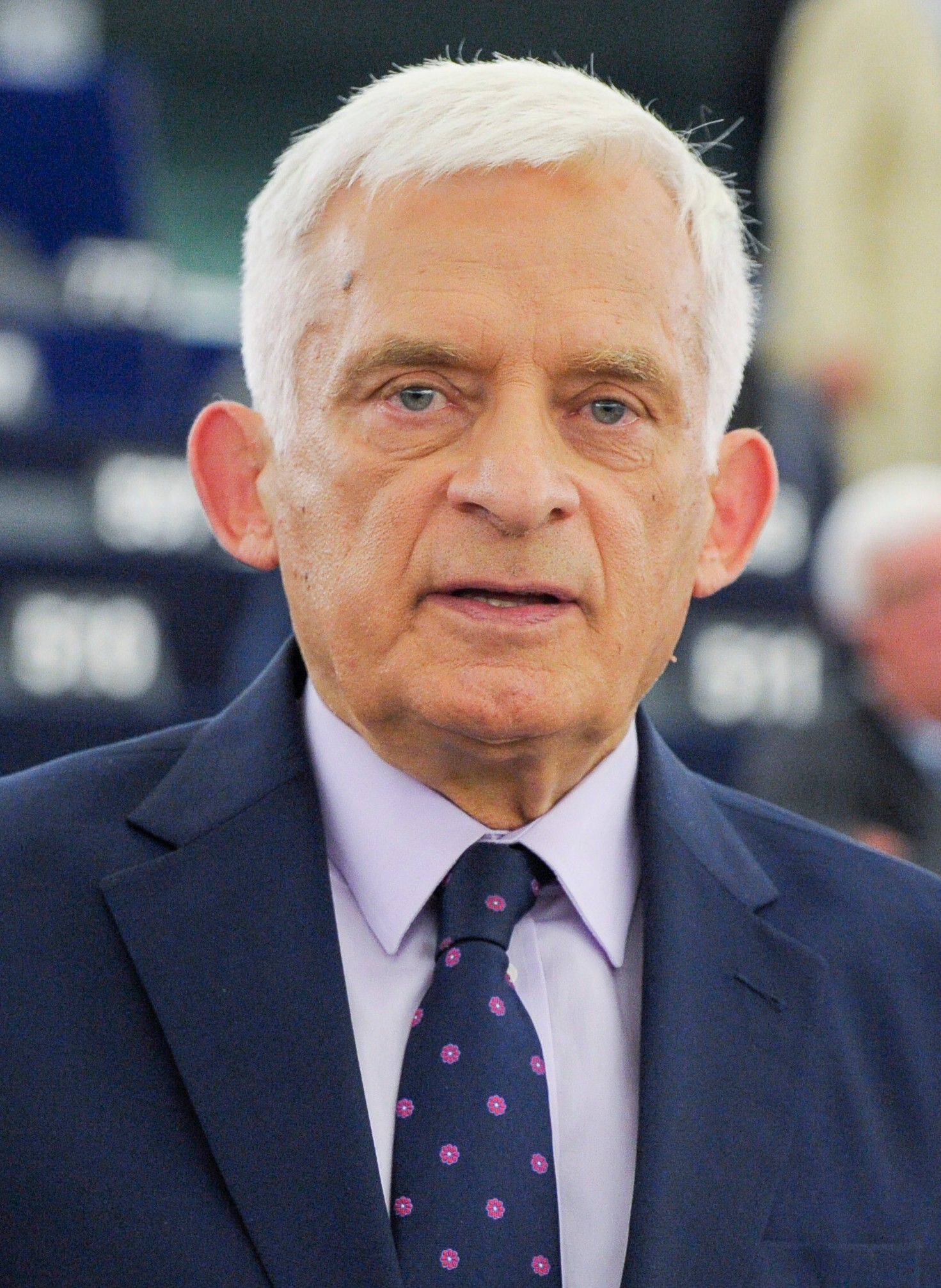
Jerzy Buzek former president of the European Parliament (2009–2012) and former Prime Minister of Poland (1997–2001)

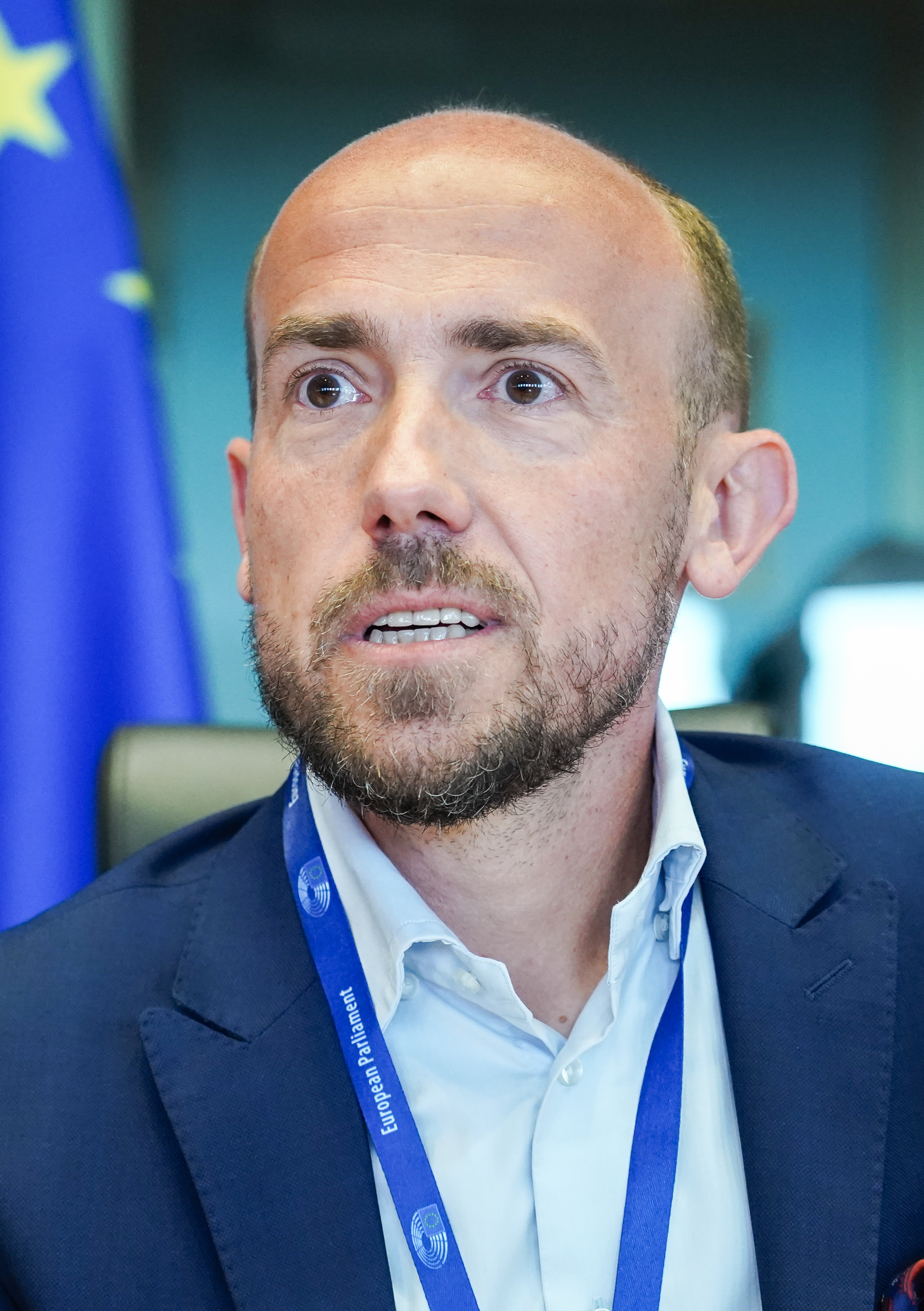
Borys Budka former minister of justice and leader of Platforma Obywatelska (2020–2021)

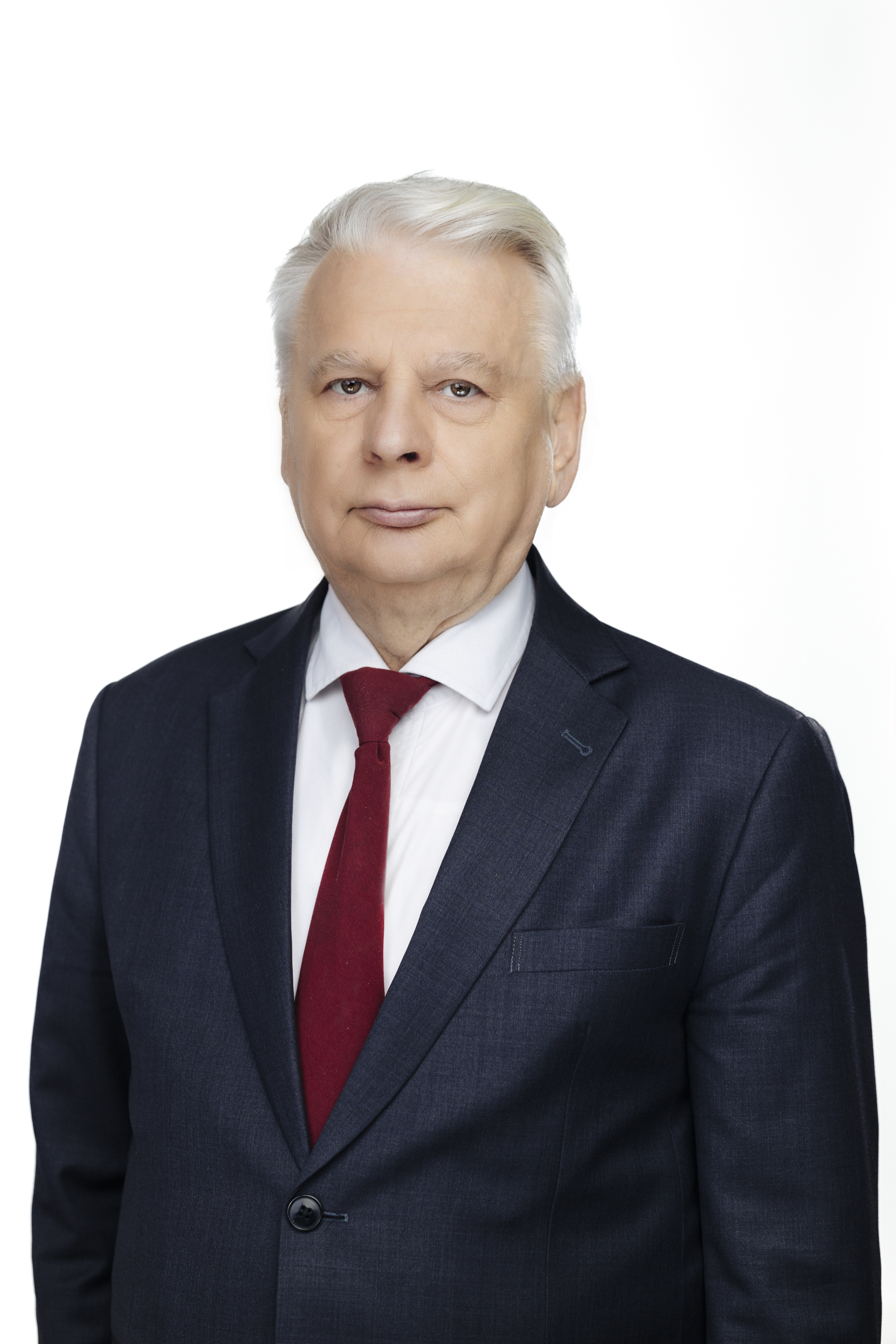
Bogdan Borusewicz former marshal of the Senate (2005–2015)

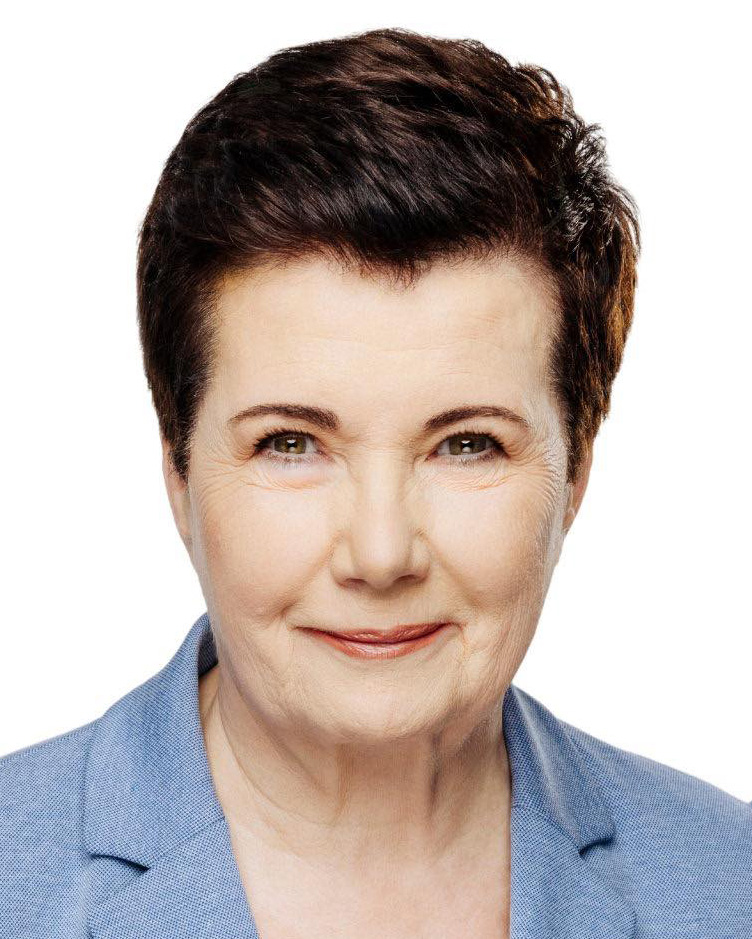
Hanna Gronkiewicz-Waltz former mayor of Warsaw (2006–2018)

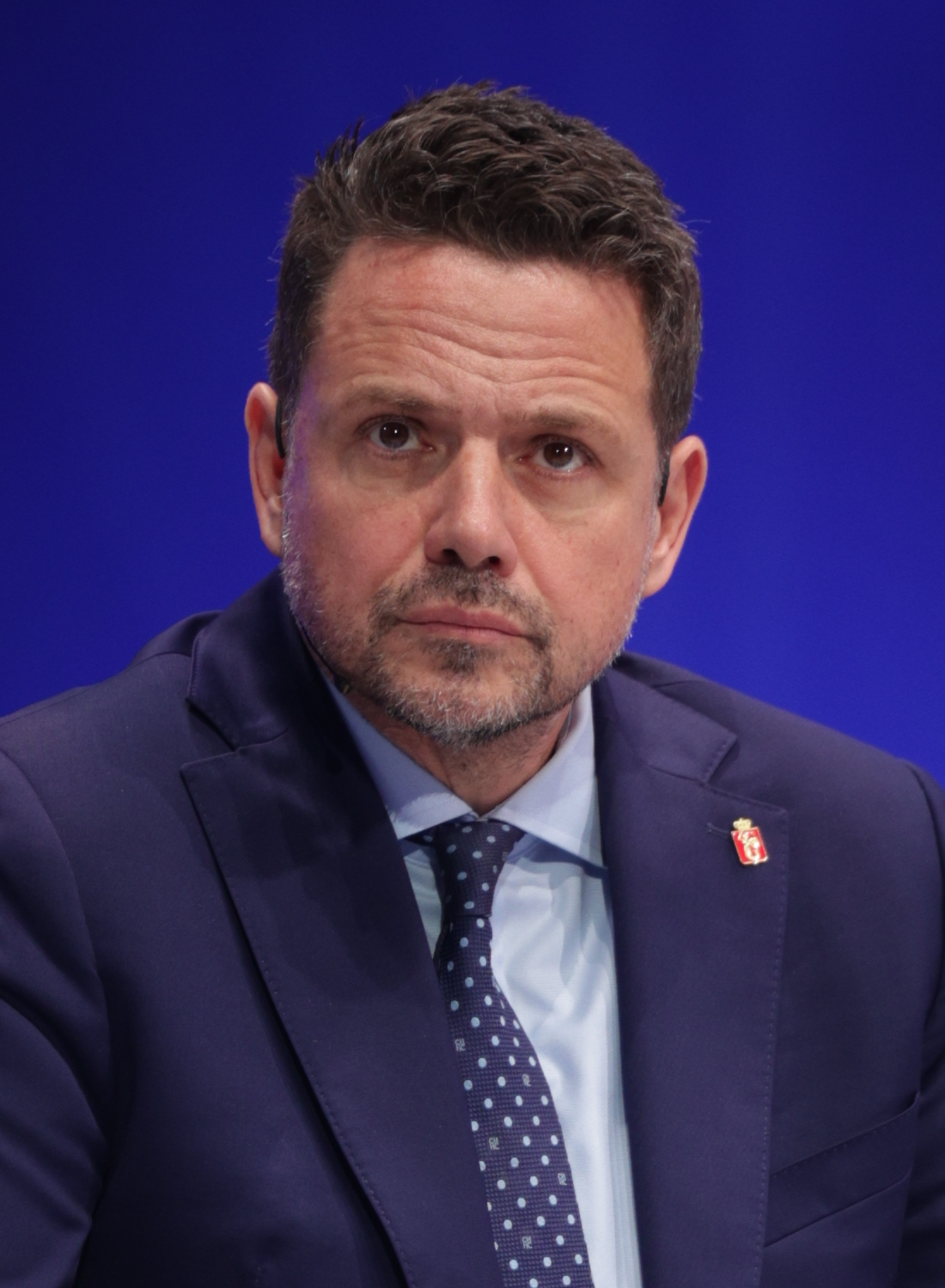
Rafał Trzaskowski Mayor of Warsaw candidate for President of Poland in 2020 and 2025

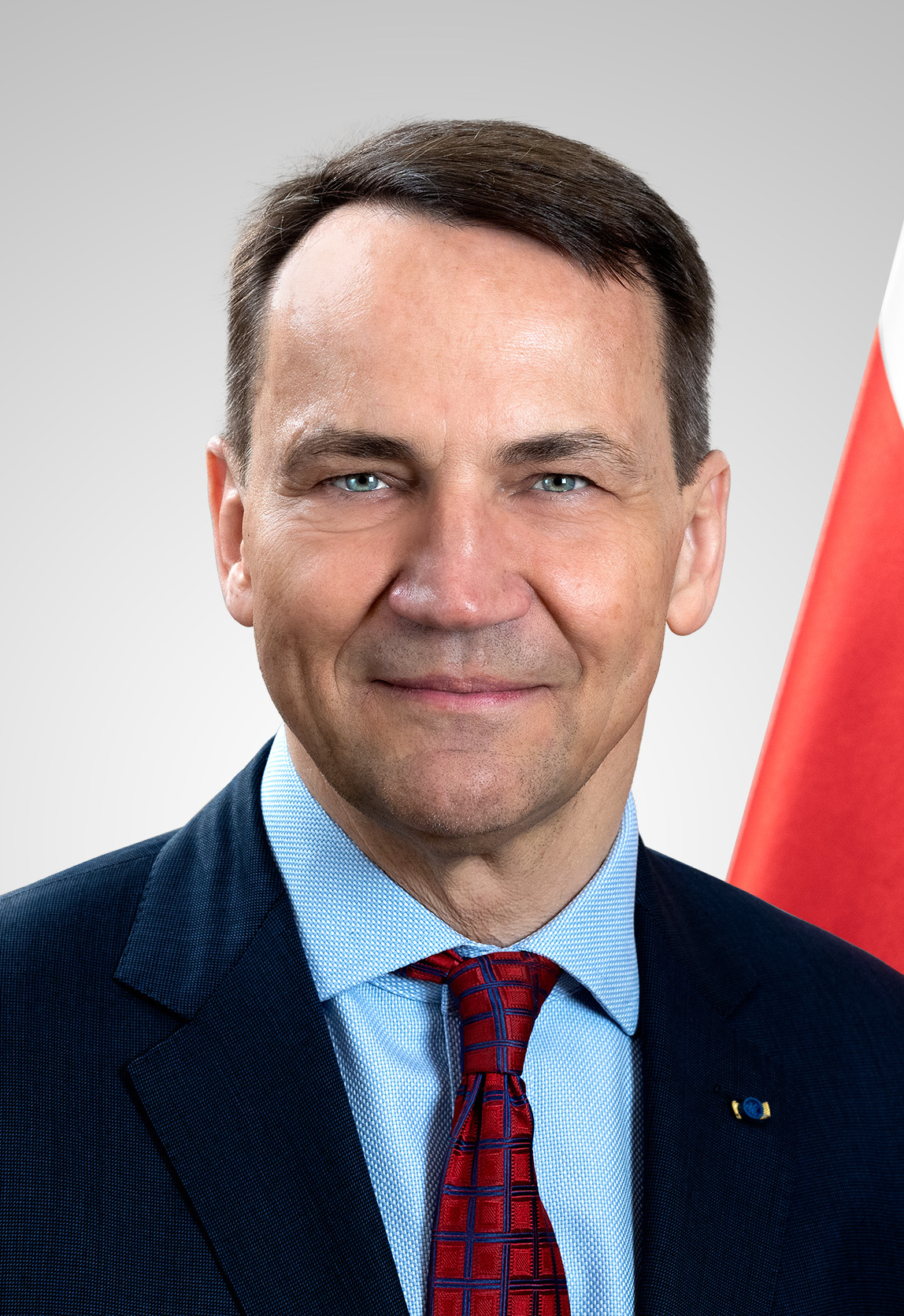
Radosław Sikorski Minister of Foreign Affairs (2007–2014, 2023–present), Deputy Prime Minister (2025–present)

=== Political support ===
Civic Platform's support was concentrated in the west and north of the country. Areas voting for Bronisław Komorowski in 2010 are shaded orange above.

As of 2020, the party enjoyed the greatest support in large cities and among people with higher education and in managerial positions, while in terms of age, the electorate was evenly distributed, and the electoral base of the Civic Platform lay in middle-aged, highly educated gold-collar and white-collar workers of the middle and upper-middle classes. As of 2020, the Civic Platform electorate was made up of more women than men, was disproportionally represented by middle-aged, urban and middle-class voters, and was characterized by higher levels of education, higher position in the socio-professional structure, as well as moderate religiosity and Roman Catholicism. The party consistently enjoyed overwhelming support of workers such as directors, managers and specialists, business owners and co-owners, and administrative workers. At the same time, the party underperformed amongst blue-collar workers, young voters, farmers and students, as well as unemployed voters. In regards to age, Civic Platform performed the best amongst voters aged 40–49, while also performing strongly among 30-39 and 50-59 year olds. The party performs the worst amongst the oldest (aged 60 or more) and the youngest (aged 29 or less) voters. The party strongly appealed to urban voters, as almost a half of voters living in big cities (500,000 people or more) vote for Civic Platform; support for the party remains strong in middle-sized cities but strongly declines in small towns and the countryside, as on average only 15% of rural voters support it.

As of 2016, an overwhelming majority of party's supporters (83%) were Roman Catholics, and 44% of these voters partook in religious practices at least once a week. As of 2016, the party was supported by the Christian left, as well as liberal and moderate Catholics, while most of conservative Catholics in Poland support Law and Justice instead. Churchgoing Catholics are roughly evenly split between Civic Platform and Law and Justice, with a significant minority of churchgoers supporting Polish People's Party as well. Catholics who support Civic Platform "oppose, on the one hand, the state's enforcement of religious norms and, on the other, do not condone their violation". This was largely consistent with the party's attitude towards religion, which combines a moderately conservative and politically Catholic program with left-wing economic slogans, supported by Catholic social teaching and the teaching of John Paul II contained in the encyclical Centesimus annus.

As of 2020, most of Civic Platform's electorate identified as liberal conservatives, centrists and moderate conservatives. No tendency dominates, as the party's supporters are roughly evenly split between political tendencies - 35% of party's supporters identify with political center, 28% as left-wing, and 24% as right-wing. Throughout the 2010s, Civic Platform had been losing left-wing supporters due to the re-emergence of Lewica as well as Janusz Palikot's defection from the party. The party also faced a challenge from Nowoczesna, whose vote "came largely from former Civic Platform supporters, disappointed with its failure to shake off its social conservatism". According to Janusz Jartyś of the University of Szczecin, the ideological base of Civic Platform are "national-conservative, liberal and social-democratic voters", with each faction expecting "at least partial implementation of their demands, stability in the governance of the country and social peace". According to Søren Riishøj, the party was also unpopular amongst the traditionally social-democratic voters, who were opposed to Europeanisation and globalization, and were critical of the Civic Platform's "almost U.S. type of election campaign."

As of 2021, according to CBOS, Civic Platform was overwhelmingly popular amongst pro-European voters, with almost 80% of party's supporters wishing to cooperate with the European Union more. The party was generally supported by moderates, as most of the party's voters wish for a "compromise" on issues such as abortion. Economically, the party was supported by pro-business and welfare-oriented voters alike; while most of Civic Platform's supporters believe that Poland should become a welfare state, they are evenly split on issues such as progressive taxation and flat tax, and nationalization vs. privatization. The party has also enjoyed the support of regionalists, autonomists and voters supportive of decentralization and localism in general. Over 90% of Civic Platform supporters believe that local governments should have more power and that the national government should devolve its power to the regional governments of gminas and voivodeships. The party was supported by Silesian regionalists, and had organized joint electoral lists with Silesian parties like Silesian Autonomy Movement and Silesian Regional Party. Local politicians of the Civic Platform in Silesia are often associated with Silesian regionalism as well. The party also enjoys support from the Kashubians and their local autonomist movement, with the co-founder of the party, Donald Tusk, having expressed his support for autonomous Kashubia in 1992.

In March 2023, Tusk stated that Silesian should be considered a language rather than an ethnolect as it has unique literature and grammar, and promised to recognize Silesian as an official, statutory language of Upper Silesia. Tusk also declared that he was a regionalist.

== Election results ==
=== Presidential ===
| Election year | Candidate | 1st round | | 2nd round | |
| Election year | Candidate | # of overall votes | % of overall vote | # of overall votes | % of overall vote |
|---|---|---|---|---|---|
| 2005 | Donald Tusk | 5,429,666 | 36.3 (#1) | 7,022,319 | 46.0 (#2) |
| 2010 | Bronisław Komorowski | 6,981,319 | 41.5 (#1) | 8,933,887 | 53.0 (#1) |
| 2015 | Supported Bronisław Komorowski | 5,031,060 | 33.8 (#2) | 8,112,311 | 48.5 (#2) |
| 2020 | Rafał Trzaskowski | 5,917,340 | 30.5 (#2) | 10,018,263 | 48.9 (#2) |
| 2025 | Rafał Trzaskowski | 6,147,797 | 31.4 (#1) | 10,237,286 | 49.1 (#2) |

=== Sejm ===
| Election | Leader | Votes | % | Seats | +/– | Government |
|---|---|---|---|---|---|---|
| 2001 | Maciej Płażyński | 1,651,099 | 12.7 (#2) | 65 / 460 | | SLD-UP-PSL (2001-2003) |
| 2001 | Maciej Płażyński | 1,651,099 | 12.7 (#2) | 65 / 460 | | SLD-UP (2003-2005) |
| 2001 | Maciej Płażyński | 1,651,099 | 12.7 (#2) | 65 / 460 | | SLD-UP-SDPL (2004-2005) |
| 2005 | Donald Tusk | 2,849,259 | 24.1 (#2) | 133 / 460 | ▲68 | PiS Minority (2005) |
| 2005 | Donald Tusk | 2,849,259 | 24.1 (#2) | 133 / 460 | ▲68 | PiS–SRP–LPR (2006-2007) |
| 2007 | Donald Tusk | 6,701,010 | 41.5 (#1) | 209 / 460 | ▲76 | PO–PSL |
| 2011 | Donald Tusk | 5,629,773 | 39.2 (#1) | 207 / 460 | ▼2 | PO–PSL |
| 2015 | Ewa Kopacz | 3,661,474 | 24.1 (#2) | 138 / 460 | ▼69 | PiS |
| 2019 | Grzegorz Schetyna | 5,060,355 | 27.4 (#2) | 102 / 460 | ▼36 | PiS |
| 2019 | As part of Civic Coalition, which won 134 seats in total. | | | | | |
| 2023 | Donald Tusk | 6,629,402 | 30.7 (#2) | 127 / 460 | ▲25 | KO-PL2050-KP-NL |
| 2023 | As part of Civic Coalition, which won 157 seats in total. | | | | | |

=== Senate ===
| Election | Vtes | % | Seats | +/– | Majority |
|---|---|---|---|---|---|
| 2001 | 6,582,224 | 24.34 (#2) | 2 / 100 | | SLD–UP |
| 2001 | As part of the Senate 2001 coalition, which won 15 seats. | | | | |
| 2005 | 4,090,497 | 16.94 (#2) | 34 / 100 | ▲32 | No majority - PiS largest (2005) |
| 2005 | 4,090,497 | 16.94 (#2) | 34 / 100 | ▲32 | PiS–SRP–LPR (2006-2007) |
| 2007 | 12,734,742 | 39.14 (#1) | 60 / 100 | ▲26 | PO |
| 2011 | 5,173,300 | 35.60 (#1) | 63 / 100 | ▲3 | PO–PSL |
| 2015 | 4,323,789 | 28.85 (#2) | 34 / 100 | ▼29 | PiS |
| 2019 | 6,490,306 | 35.66 (#2) | 41 / 100 | ▲7 | KO–KP–SLD |
| 2019 | As part of the Civic Coalition, which won 43 seats. | | | | |
| 2023 | 6,187,295 | 28.91 (#2) | 41 / 100 | 0 | KO–PL2050–KP–NL–LR |
| 2023 | As part of the Senate Pact 2023, which won 66 seats. | | | | |

=== European Parliament ===
| Election | Leader | votes | % | Seats | +/– | EP Group |
|---|---|---|---|---|---|---|
| 2004 | Jerzy Buzek | 1,467,775 | 24.1 (#1) | 15 / 54 | New | EPP-ED |
| 2009 | Danuta Hübner | 3,271,852 | 44.4 (#1) | 25 / 50 | ▲10 | EPP |
| 2014 | Danuta Hübner | 2,271,215 | 32.1 (#1) | 19 / 51 | ▼6 | EPP |
| 2019 | Włodzimierz Cimoszewicz | 5,249,935 | 27.89 (#2) | 14 / 51 | ▼5 | EPP |
| 2019 | As part of the European Coalition, that won 22 seats in total. | | | | | |
| 2024 | Marcin Kierwiński | 4,359,443 | 37.04 (#1) | 18 / 51 | ▲4 | EPP |
| 2024 | As part of the Civic Coalition, that won 21 seats in total. | | | | | |

=== Regional assemblies ===
| Election year | % of vote | # of overall seats won | +/– |
|---|---|---|---|
| 2002 | 12.1 (#4) | 79 / 561 | |
| 2002 | In coalition with Law and Justice (POPiS). | | |
| 2006 | 27.2 (#1) | 186 / 561 | |
| 2010 | 30.9 (#1) | 222 / 561 | ▲36 |
| 2014 | 26.3 (#2) | 179 / 555 | ▼43 |
| 2018 | 27.1 (#2) | 194 / 552 | ▲15 |
| 2018 | As the Civic Coalition. | | |
| 2024 | 30.6 (#2) | 210 / 552 | ▲16 |
| 2024 | As the Civic Coalition. | | |

=== Voivodeship Marshals ===
| Name | Image | Voivodeship | Date Vocation |
|---|---|---|---|
| Elżbieta Polak | | Lubusz Voivodeship | 29 November 2010 |
| Marek Woźniak | | Greater Poland Voivodeship | 10 October 2005 |
| Piotr Całbecki | | Kuyavian-Pomeranian Voivodeship | 24 January 2006 |
| Olgierd Geblewicz | | West Pomeranian Voivodeship | 7 December 2010 |
| Mieczysław Struk | | Pomeranian Voivodeship | 22 February 2010 |
| Andrzej Buła | | Opole Voivodeship | 12 November 2013 |

== See also ==
- List of Civic Platform politicians
- Politics of Poland
- List of political parties in Poland
- Liberalism in Poland

== Sources ==
- Adam Zakowski, A leading force, Polityka, March 2009
