= Freedom Union (Poland) =

Freedom Union Unia Wolności
- Abbreviation: UW
- Chairman: Tadeusz Mazowiecki (1994–1995); Leszek Balcerowicz (1995–2000); Bronisław Geremek (2000–2001); Władysław Frasyniuk (2001–2005)
- Founded: 20 March 1994; 32 years ago
- Dissolved: 9 May 2005; 21 years ago
- Merger of: Democratic Union; Liberal Democratic Congress; Splitting off the Alliance of Democrats
- Succeeded by: Democratic Party; Civic Platform
- Ideology: Neoliberalism
- Political position: Centre-right
- European affiliation: European Democrat Union/European People's Party (1996–2002); Alliance of Liberals and Democrats for Europe Group (2002–2005)
- European Parliament group: European Liberal Democrat and Reform Party (2002–2005)

Website
- uw.org.pl (archived)
- Politics of Poland; Political parties; Elections; a: In 24 January 2001, KLD faction split from this party to form Civic Platform.

The Freedom Union (Polish: Unia Wolności, UW) was a liberal democratic political party in Poland that was active from 1994 to 2005, when it rebranded and became the Democratic Party.

== History ==
It was founded on 20 March 1994 out of the merger of the Democratic Union (Unia Demokratyczna, UD) and the Liberal Democratic Congress (Kongres Liberalno-Demokratyczny, KLD). Both of these parties had roots in the Solidarity trade union movement. It represented European democratic and liberal tradition, i.e., it advocated free market economy and individual liberty, rejected extremism and fanaticism, favoured European integration (in the form of European Union membership), rapid privatisation of the enterprises still owned by the Polish state and decentralisation of the government.

Timeline of Polish liberal parties after 1989
• Citizens' Movement for Democratic Action /ROAD (1990–1991)
• Liberal Democratic Congress /KLD (1990–1994)
• Democratic Union /UD (1991–1994)
• Freedom Union /UW (1994–2005)
• Civic Platform (2001–2025)
• Democratic Party /PD (2005–2016)
• Palikot's Movement /RP (2011–2013)
• Your Movement /TR (2013–2023)
• Modern/.N (2015– )
• Poland 2050 (2020– )
• Civic Coalition (2025– )

In the 1991 general elections, the KLD received 7.5% of the vote and 37 seats in the Sejm (out of 460 seats) and the UD got 12.3% of the votes and 62 seats. In 1993 the KLD got 4.0% of the votes and was left without seats; the UD got 10.6% of the votes and 74 seats. In 1997 the UW got 13.4% of the votes and 60 seats.

In January 2001 some members of the FU (mostly from centre-right and KLD factions) decided to move to join the new Civic Platform (Platforma Obywatelska), which got 12.7% of the votes and 65 seats in the September 2001 general elections whilst the FU failed to cross the 5% threshold required to gain entry to the lower house of Parliament, receiving only 3.1%. Surprisingly, the FU managed to cross the required 5% threshold in the 2004 European Parliament elections, receiving 7% of votes and 4 of 54 seats reserved for Poland in the European Parliament as part of the European Liberal Democrat and Reform Party, of which it was a member.

The initiative by the FU leadership to found the centre/social-liberal Democratic Party (Partia Demokratyczna – demokraci.pl) attracted a lot of attention. It was cofounded by Władysław Frasyniuk and economy minister Jerzy Hausner, joined by prime minister Marek Belka. Former FU member Tadeusz Mazowiecki also joined the initiative. Legally the centrist Democratic Party, founded 9 May 2005, is the successor of the FU.

== Election results ==
=== Sejm ===
Election year	# of votes	% of vote	# of overall seats won	+/–	Government
1997	1,749,518	13.4 (#3)	60 / 460	▼14	AWS-UW (1997–2000)
1997	1,749,518	13.4 (#3)	60 / 460	▼14	Opposition (2000–2001)
2001	404,074	3.1 (#9)	0 / 460	▼60	Extra-parliamentary

=== Senate ===
Election year	# of overall seats won	+/–
1997	8 / 100	
2001	5 / 100	▼3
As part of the Senate 2001 coalition, which won 15 seats.

=== Presidential ===
Election year	Candidate	1st round		2nd round	
Election year	Candidate	# of overall votes	% of overall vote	# of overall votes	% of overall vote
1995	Jacek Kuroń	1,646,946	9.2 (#3)	Endorsed Lech Wałęsa	

=== Regional assemblies ===
Election year	% of vote	# of overall seats won	+/–
1998	10.3 (#4)	76 / 855	
2002	2.3 (#7)	3 / 561	▼73

=== European Parliament ===
Election year	# of votes	% of vote	# of overall seats won	+/–
2004	446,549	7.3 (#6)	4 / 54	

== Former leader ==
- Władysław Frasyniuk – Party chairman

== Members of Polish Parliament (Sejm) ==
- None since 2001

== Former Members of Polish Senate ==
- Olga Teresa Krzyżanowska – caucus vice-chairperson
- Dorota Simonides
- Kazimierz Kutz
- Andrzej Jan Wielowieyski – caucus chairman
- Grażyna Staniszewska (until 13 June 2004, elected to the European Parliament)

== Members of the European Parliament of the former Freedom Union ==
- Bronisław Geremek, historian and politician, ex-minister of foreign affairs
- Jan Kułakowski, journalist, ex-Poland-EU negotiator
- Janusz Onyszkiewicz, mathematician and politician, vice-president of the European Parliament
- Grażyna Staniszewska, politician, senator

== Other prominent members ==
- Jan Rokita – now Civic Platform
- Donald Tusk – now Civic Platform
- Janusz Lewandowski – now Civic Platform
- Jacek Kuroń – died 17 June 2004

== See also ==
- Liberalism in Poland
- Liberalism
- Contributions to liberal theory
- Liberalism worldwide
- List of liberal parties
- Liberal democracy
