= Movement for the Reconstruction of Poland =

Former Polish political party

Movement for the Reconstruction of Poland Ruch Odbudowy Polski
- Leader: Jan Olszewski (1995–2011); Stanisław Gogacz (2011–2012)
- Founded: 18 November 1995
- Dissolved: 23 June 2012
- Headquarters: Al. Zjednoczenia 17 lok. 27a, 01-829, Warsaw
- Ideology: Conservatism; Pro-Europeanism
- Political position: Right-wing
- Colours: Red; White
- Politics of Poland; Political parties; Elections; a: Also described as socioculturally right-wing and economically left-wing.

The Movement for the Reconstruction of Poland (Polish: Ruch Odbudowy Polski, ROP) was a conservative political party in Poland.

== History ==
The party was formed in 1995 by former members of the Movement for the Republic and, previously, the Centre Agreement. Its leader was Jan Olszewski, who had obtained 6.9% of the vote in the 1995 presidential election.

The party participated in the 1997 parliamentary election, obtaining 5.6% of the vote.

During the following elections in 2001, two of its members were elected to the Sejm from the League of Polish Families' lists.

In the 2007 parliamentary election, ROP members were elected from the Law and Justice's lists.

In January 2011, Olszewski resigned from party leadership due to his worsening health. He was replaced by Stanisław Gogacz.

The party was disbanded on 23 June 2012.

== Leaders ==
- Jan Olszewski (1995–2011)
- Stanisław Gogacz (2011–2012)

== Sejm members, 2001–2005 ==
- Tadeusz Kędziak, Piotrków Trybunalski
- Henryk Lewczuk, Chełm
- Jan Olszewski, Warsaw
