= 2003 Democratic Left Alliance leadership election =

Polish election

- 29 June 2003
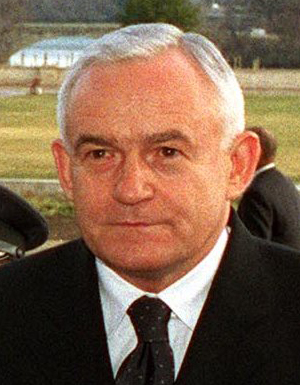
Candidate	Leszek Miller
Popular vote	625
Percentage	80.44%
Leader before election
Leszek Miller
Elected Leader
Leszek Miller

The 2003 Democratic Left Alliance leadership election was held on 29 June 2003 to elect the leader of the Democratic Left Alliance. Leszek Miller, the incumbent leader and Prime Minister of Poland, was re-elected with 80% of the vote.

== Election ==
The election was held on 29 June 2003 at the 2nd Democratic Left Alliance Congress in Warsaw. Incumbent party leader Leszek Miller and general secretary Marek Dyduch were re-elected with no opponents standing against them, gaining 80% and 91% of the vote, respectively. Five deputy leaders were elected: Józef Oleksy (580 votes), Jerzy Szmajdziński (522 votes), Krzysztof Janik (501 votes), Andrzej Celiński (414 votes) and Aleksandra Jakubowska (397 votes in a runoff). The election was a noted success for Miller, with his allies securing key roles in the party.

== Results ==
=== Party leader ===
Candidate	Vote	%
Leszek Miller ✓	625	80.44
Against	152	19.56
Total votes	777	100.00
Source: Wprost

=== General secretary ===
Candidate	Vote	%
Marek Dyduch ✓	705	90.62
Against	73	9.38
Total votes	778	100.00
Source: Wirtualna Polska
