= Left and Democrats =

Centre-left electoral alliance of political parties in Poland

Left and Democrats Lewica i Demokraci
- Leader: Aleksander Kwaśniewski, Jan Lityński
- Founded: 3 September 2006
- Dissolved: April 2008
- Preceded by: Democratic Left Alliance – Labour Union
- Succeeded by: United Left
- Headquarters: ul. Rozbrat 44 A, 00-419 Warsaw
- Ideology: Social democracy Social liberalism
- Political position: Centre-left

Website
- www.lid.org.pl

Left and Democrats (Polish: Lewica i Demokraci, LiD) was a centre-left electoral alliance of political parties in Poland which was created on 3 September 2006, before the Warsaw municipal election of 2006. The coalition's aim was to provide an alternative for both Law and Justice and Civic Platform, which have been Poland's two major political parties since 2005. LiD contested their first national election in October 2007 and won 53 seats to the Polish parliament, the Sejm. The LiD alliance was dissolved in April 2008, following a rift between the member parties.

== Origins ==
On 15 September 2006 the Coalition Election Committee was officially appointed under the name of "SLD+SdPl+PD+UP – Lewica i Demokraci" (containing the abbreviations for all the member parties as well as the name 'Leftists and Democrats'). The four member parties were:

- Democratic Left Alliance (SLD), social-democratic
- Social Democracy of Poland (SDPL), social-democratic
- Labour Union (UP), social-democratic
- Democratic Party – demokraci.pl (PD), social-liberal

At the beginning, the coalition was created only to enter candidates in regional councils. However, later it functioned during elections to many other, smaller units of local government, such as mayorships and town councils.

The September 2006 Agreement that founded the coalition accused the then incumbent government, led by the Law and Justice party, of causing an erosion of democracy in Poland. Wojciech Olejniczak, the chairman of Democratic Left Alliance, argued that the only true alternative to Law and Justice would be a coalition of the centre and left parties, alleging that Civic Platform, then the largest opposition party in the Polish Sejm, was too close politically to the Law and Justice Party.

The party's founding act also emphasized such elements as local government, Poland as part of an "open and modern Europe", protection of democratic institutions and separation of powers, opposition to a "closed" foreign policy, and support for pluralism and tolerance as the hallmarks of a democratic society.

== Polish local elections, 2006 ==
=== Platform ===
Parties creating the coalition decided to follow three main principles in the lead up to the 2006 local elections:

- Civil and democratic local government – self-government authorities have to apply to their constitutional and legal principles completely and according to law. Powers of the local authority should be extended at the cost of the central – national authority.
- Solidary in local government - actions, which are performed by self-government authorities should be based on the rule of social solidarity, based on the tenet that all citizens should have access to essential public services.
- Clear and honest local government – local cliques, corruption, corrupt restrictions and violations of law in local government should be put to an end. Actions of the local authority should be clear and comprehensible to every citizen.

=== Candidates for Mayors ===
This table includes all candidates officially affiliated with, or supported by, the coalition in the 2006 local elections.

candidate	city	party	result (%)	result (votes)	position	other
Marek Borowski	Warsaw	SDPL	23.24%	9889	3	----
Jacek Majchrowski	Kraków	independent	42.31%	103157	1	elected as mayor in the runoff
Krzysztof Pusz	Gdańsk	PD	5.12%	8122	3	----
Jacek Piechota	Szczecin	SLD	27.91%	38059	2	promoted to the runoff
Andrzej Nowakowski	Poznań	SLD	----	----	4	----
Izabella Sierakowska	Lublin	SDPL	25.31%	28777	1	promoted to the runoff
Krzysztof Makowski	Łódź	SLD	23.33%	51758	3	----
Joanna Grzela	Kielce	SLD	20.65%	13575	2	----
Andrzej Namyslo	Opole	SLD	----	----	----	----
Tomasz Czajkowski	Wrocław	SLD	----	----	----	----
Marek Szczerbowski	Katowice	SLD	5.49%	5323	4	----
Janusz Kochan	Białystok	SLD	9.67%	8550	3	----
Stanisław Szatkowski	Olsztyn	SLD	----	----	----	----
Tadeusz Ferenc	Rzeszów	SLD	76.59%	48131	1	elected as mayor
Zbigniew Kosmaty	Piła	independent	46.16%	10577	1	elected as mayor in the runoff
Janusz Kubicki	Zielona Góra	SLD	----	----	----	elected as mayor in the runoff
Tadeusz Jędrzejczak	Gorzów Wielkopolski	independent	50.6%	18575	1	elected as mayor
Kazimierz Górski	Sosnowiec	SLD	51.00%	----	1	elected as mayor
Jan Szczęśniewski	Świętochłowice	SDPL	8.15%	1293	3	----
Krzysztof Matyjaszczyk	Częstochowa	SLD	20.83%	14683	3	----
Jerzy Balon	Bielsko-Biała	SLD	5.25%	3038	5	----
Krzysztof Wójcik	Bytom	SLD	17.29%	8178	3	----
Marzena Dobrowolska	Gdynia	SLD	5.21%	5009	3	----
Henryk Słonina	Elbląg	independent	58.22%	21977	1	elected as mayor
Janusz Łapiński	Gliwice	SLD	12.03%	6482	3	----
Eugeniusz Ochryciuk	Łomża	independent	2.70%	530	7	----
Zbigniew Jastrzębski	Sopot	SLD	----	----	----	----
Sylwester Kwiecień	Starachowice	SLD	----	5963	1	promoted to the runoff
Krzysztof Bazula	Tarnów	SLD	3.63%	1378	6	----
Jerzy Wereta	Zabrze	SLD	----	5172	5	----
Zbigniew Podraza	Dąbrowa Górnicza	SLD	----	----	----	elected as mayor in the runoff
Kazimierz Zięba	Rybnik	SDPL	----	----	----	----
Sławomir Lis	Jastrzębie-Zdrój	SLD	----	----	----	----
Edmund Stachowicz	Starogard Gdański	SLD	58.29%	----	1	elected as mayor

=== Comparison of the Results of the 2006 Elections ===
type of election	number of votes	% of votes	number of the elected	% of the elected
to provincial assemblies	1910009	14.25%	66	11.76%
to district councils	----	8.87%	468	7.45%
to municipal councils	----	8.78%	1357	3.40%
for commune heads and mayors of towns and cities	----	----	42	1.71%

== Polish parliamentary elections, 2007 ==
Although the coalition was initially conceived as a temporary electoral alliance for the 2006 local elections, cooperation between the parties continued, and on 18 January 2007 a Political Negotiating Committee headed by former Polish President Aleksander Kwaśniewski was created, for the purpose of clarifying a common centre-left political program.

The members of the Political Negotiating Committee were:

- Aleksander Kwaśniewski, former President of Poland (non-party)
- Wojciech Olejniczak, Chairman of the Democratic Left Alliance (SLD)
- Jerzy Szmajdziński, Chairman of SLD Parliamentary Caucus (SLD)
- Marek Borowski, Chairman of Social Democracy (SDPL)
- Waldemar Witkowski, Chairman of the Labour Union (UP)
- Janusz Onyszkiewicz, Chairman of the Democratic Party (PD)

LiD contested their first national elections in October 2007. Aleksander Kwaśniewski led the campaign, as the nominal head of the coalition, and its candidate for Prime Minister. LiD managed to take 13.2% of the national vote, and 53 seats, therefore achieving third place after the Civic Platform & Law and Justice parties, respectively. Of the 53 seats gained, the SLD took 37 seats, SDPL took 10, PD took 1, whilst non-party candidates took 5 seats (3 candidates were affiliated with the SLD and 2 affiliated with PD). The 4th coalition partner, the UP, did not win any seats. LiD did not manage to elect any of its members to the upper house Senate. Following the elections, LiD was not invited to participate in the coalition of the victorious Civic Platform with the agrarian Polish People's Party (PSL). Nevertheless, LiD held some leverage in the new Sejm, as the government on occasion needed its votes to overturn presidential vetoes on government legislation. Kwaśniewski announced his resignation from the leadership of LiD, following the outcome of the election.

== LiD Parliamentary parliamentary group (2007-2008) ==
- Wojciech Olejniczak (SLD) - Parliamentary Chairman
- Wacław Martyniuk (SLD) - Parliamentary Secretary
- Jerzy Szmajdziński (SLD) - Vice-Marshall of the Sejm
- Romuald Ajchler (SDPL)
- Leszek Aleksandrzak (SLD)
- Bartosz Arłukowicz (SDPL)
- Marek Balicki (SDPL)
- Anna Bańkowska (SDPL)
- Anita Błochowiak (SLD)
- Marek Borowski (SDPL)
- Andrzej Celiński (SDPL)
- Eugeniusz Czykwin (SLD)
- Marian Filar (independent, affiliated with PD)
- Tomasz Garbowski (SLD)
- Witold Gintowt-Dziewałtowski (SLD)
- Henryk Gołębiewski (SLD)
- Tadeusz Iwiński (SLD)
- Zdzisława Janowska (SDPL)
- Izabela Jaruga-Nowacka (independent, affiliated with SLD)
- Ryszard Kalisz (SLD)
- Tomasz Kamiński (SLD)
- Witold Klepacz (SLD)
- Jan Kochanowski (SLD)
- Sławomir Kopyciński (SLD)
- Bożena Kotkowska (SDPL)
- Janusz Krasoń (SLD)
- Bogdan Lis (PD)
- Krystyna Łybacka (SLD)
- Zbigniew Matuszczak (SLD)
- Jarosław Matwiejuk (independent, affiliated with SLD)
- Krzysztof Matyjaszczyk (SLD)
- Henryk Milcarz (SLD)
- Tadeusz Motowidło (SLD)
- Grzegorz Napieralski (SLD)
- Artur Ostrowski (SLD)
- Grzegorz Pisalski (SDPL)
- Wojciech Pomajda (independent, affiliated with SLD)
- Stanisława Prządka (SLD)
- Stanisław Rydzoń (SLD)
- Joanna Senyszyn (SLD)
- Izabella Sierakowska (SDPL)
- Stanisław Stec (SLD)
- Elżbieta Streker-Dembińska (SLD)
- Wiesław Szczepański (SLD)
- Jolanta Szymanek-Deresz (SLD)
- Tadeusz Tomaszewski (SLD)
- Jerzy Wenderlich (SLD)
- Jan Widacki (independent, affiliated with PD)
- Marek Wikiński (SLD)
- Bogusław Wontor (SLD)
- Stanisław Wziątek (SLD)
- Ryszard Zbrzyzny (SLD)
- Janusz Zemke (SLD)

== Dissolution ==
There were several factors which led to the collapse of the LiD alliance. One of the issues was the internal disappointment with the alliance's performance in the 2007 elections. Some groups within the leading SLD party perceived that the main beneficiaries of the alliance were the SDPL and PD parties, whilst the SLD parliamentary representation dropped from 55 to 40 seats, when compared to the 2005 election. In the view of this group, SLD could have performed just as well or better outside of LiD. Another issue was the ideological and policy differences between the social-democratic parties (SLD, SDPL, UP) and the liberal-centrist PD. Whilst the social democrats were largely opposed to the proposed Missile Defence system project under negotiation between Poland and the U.S., the PD supported the move. The left also supported more liberal abortion laws and a more critical position of the Roman Catholic Church in Poland, whilst the PD had concerns with this direction. Furthermore, there were suspicions within the smaller parties (SDPL, PD) as to SLD's strength and domination of LiD, whilst many of SLD's rank and file members were unhappy with being in alliance with SDPL, which was an offshoot party created through a very public and divisive split within SLD in 2004. On 29 March 2008, SLD leader Wojciech Olejniczak, surprised his allies by issuing a media release announcing that the alliance between SLD and PD was over, as the SLD was unable to work with PD any longer. This essentially meant that the SLD was ejecting PD from the LiD alliance, without having consulted them or the other constituent LiD parties. This decision drew sharp criticism, not only from the PD, but also Aleksander Kwaśniewski, SDPL leader Marek Borowski and even from within the SLD itself. Olejniczak was one of the architects of LiD and one of its strongest defenders within the SLD. Commentators of the Polish political scene generally explain the motivation of the course of action taken by Olejniczak and his supporters, as relating to the impending battle for the leadership of the party at the SLD June party conference, between Olejniczak himself and the party general-secretary, Grzegorz Napieralski, who dominated the SLD left-wing and was known for his LiD-sceptic views. Although Olejniczak indicated his hope that the LiD parliamentary caucus would remain intact irrespective of the LiD/PD split, on 1 April, the 3 PD parliamentarians left the LiD caucus, to form a separate parliamentary group. After the SDPL leadership consulted on how that party should respond to the crisis within LiD, Borowski announced his party's support for a resumption of talks between all parties, with the aim of rebuilding LiD, to the satisfaction of all parties concerned. This proposal was rejected by the SLD, and consequently, on 19 April Borowski announced his party's withdrawal from LiD. On 23 April, 8 out of 10 SDPL's M.P's, left the LiD caucus, to form the separate grouping called SDPL-New Left (SDPL-Nowa Lewica). The remainder of LiD M.P's (40 from SLD and 2 from SDPL) renamed themselves "Lewica" - The Left, and the LiD alliance formally came to an end.
