= Jerzy Szmajdziński =

Polish politician (1952–2010)

Jerzy Andrzej Szmajdziński KBE
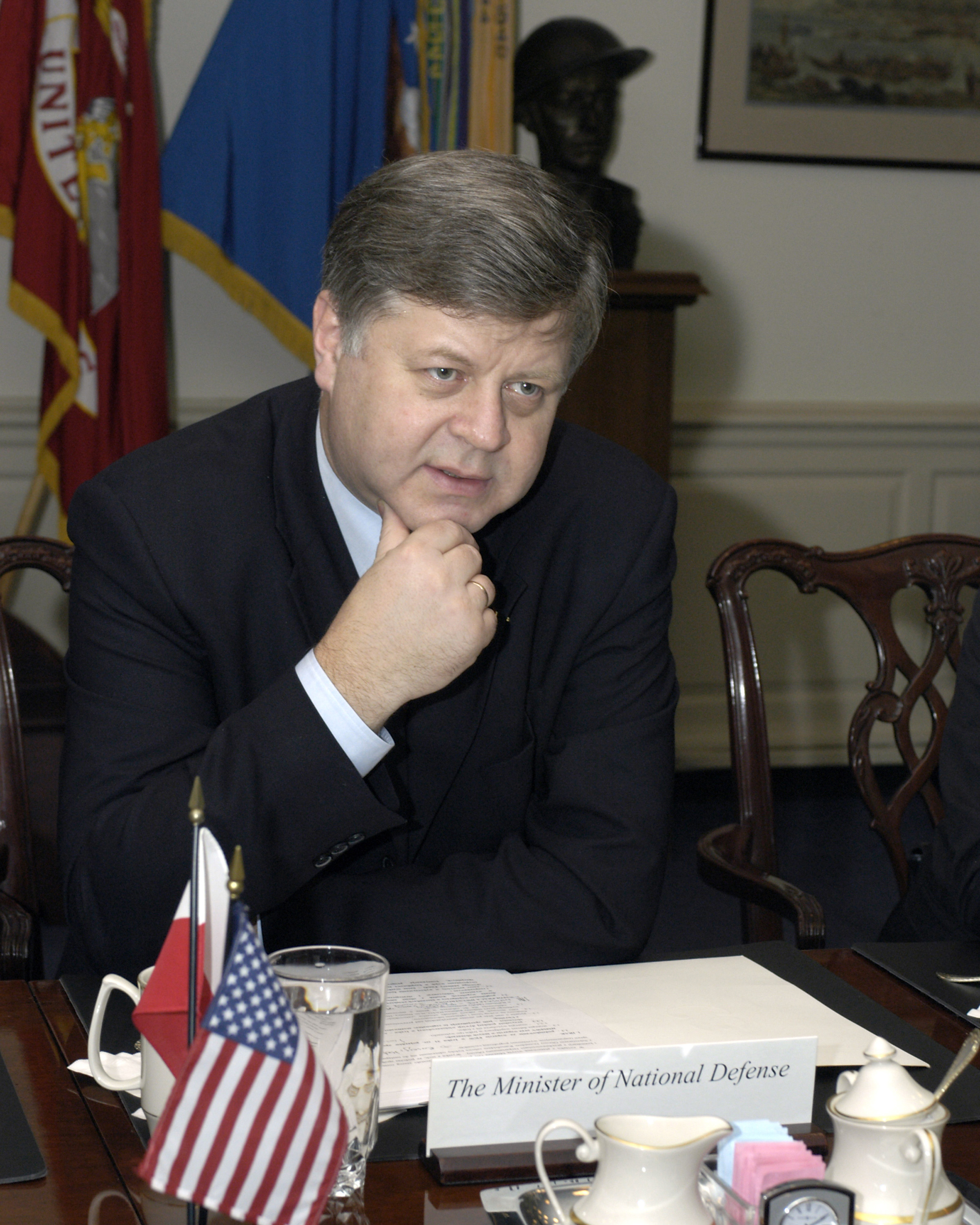

Minister of National Defence
- In office 19 October 2001 – 31 October 2005
- Prime Minister: Leszek Miller; Marek Belka
- Preceded by: Bronisław Komorowski
- Succeeded by: Radosław Sikorski

Minister of the Interior and Administration
- Acting; 21 April 2004 – 2 May 2004
- Prime Minister: Leszek Miller
- Preceded by: Józef Oleksy
- Succeeded by: Ryszard Kalisz

Deputy Marshal of the Sejm
- In office 6 November 2007 – 10 April 2010; Serving alongside: Jarosław Kalinowski; Stefan Niesiołowski; Krzysztof Putra
- Preceded by: Janusz Dobrosz, Jarosław Kalinowski, Bronisław Komorowski, Wojciech Olejniczak, Genowefa Wiśniowska

Member of the Sejm, I, II, III, IV, V and IV
- In office 25 November 1991 – 10 April 2010

Personal details
- Born: 9 April 1952 Wrocław, Poland
- Died: 10 April 2010 (aged 58) Smolensk, Russia
- Party: Polish United Workers' Party (1973–1990); Social Democracy of the Republic of Poland (1990–1999); Democratic Left Alliance (1999–); Left and Democrats (caucus, 2007–)
- Spouse: Małgorzata Sekuła-Szmajdzińska
- Profession: Economist
- Awards: Commander's Cross with Star of the Order of Polonia Restituta Knight Commander of the Order of the British Empire

Jerzy Andrzej Szmajdziński KBE (Polish pronunciation: [ˈjɛʐɨ ʂmajˈdʑiɲskʲi], 9 April 1952 – 10 April 2010) was a Polish politician who was a Deputy Marshal of Polish Sejm and previously served as Minister of Defence. He was a candidate for President of Poland in the 2010 election.

Szmajdziński graduated from the Wrocław University of Economics. In the 1970s and 1980s he was an activist for the Union of Socialist Youth and Polish Socialist Youth Union, serving as its chairman from 1986–1989. He remained a member of Polish United Workers' Party from 1973 until its end in 1990. Later, he entered the leadership position of the Social Democracy of the Republic of Poland party. In December 1999, he became the deputy chairman of the Democratic Left Alliance (SLD).

He became a member of the Sejm in 1990, and in his second term Szmajdziński was chairman of the National Defense Committee and in the third term a deputy chairman of that commission. He was Minister of National Defence from 19 October 2001 to 2005. He was elected to the Sejm on 25 September 2005, gaining 20,741 votes in 1 Legnica district as a candidate from the SLD list.

On a national SLD convention in December 2009 he was chosen as the party's candidate in the 2010 presidential elections in Poland. His candidacy received 11% of the votes in March's pre-election poll.

Szmajdziński died on the day after his 58th birthday, in the plane crash that also involved President Lech Kaczyński and 94 others.

== Electoral history ==
Sejm
Election	Party	Votes	%	Constituency	Elected?
1991	Democratic Left Alliance	5,706	2.15	Jelenia Góra	Yes
1993	Democratic Left Alliance	20,677	11.21	Jelenia Góra	Yes
1997	Democratic Left Alliance	44,397	25.68	Jelenia Góra	Yes
2001	Democratic Left Alliance – Labour Union	72,719	22.15	Legnica	Yes
2005	Democratic Left Alliance	20,741	7.32	Legnica	Yes
2007	Left and Democrats	42,724	10.56	Legnica	Yes

== Honours and awards ==
In 2002, Szmajdziński was made an honorary citizen of Jelenia Góra and in 2004 an honorary citizen of Bolków.

In 2004, he was appointed an honorary Knight Commander of the Order of the British Empire.

On 16 April 2010 he was posthumously decorated with the Commander's Cross with Star of the Order of Polonia Restituta. On the same day, the Parliament of the Province of Lower Silesia posthumously awarded him the title of Honorary Citizen of Lower Silesia. On 20 May 2010 Wrocław city council granted him the title of Honorary Citizen of Wrocław and on 28 March 2011 Legnica City Council gave him the title of Honorary Citizen of Legnica.

== Private life ==
Married to Małgorzata, the couple had two children together, Agnieszka and Andrzej.

== See also ==
- Members of Polish Sejm 2005–2007

Government offices
Preceded by Bronisław Komorowski	Minister of National Defense; 2001–2005	Succeeded by Radosław Sikorski
Preceded by Józef Oleksy	Acting Minister of Interior and Administration; 2004	Succeeded by Ryszard Kalisz
Party political offices
Preceded by Włodzimierz Cimoszewicz	Presidential Candidate for Democratic Left Alliance; 2010 (deceased)	Succeeded by Grzegorz Napieralski
