= Małgorzata Sekuła-Szmajdzińska =

Polish politician (born 1956)

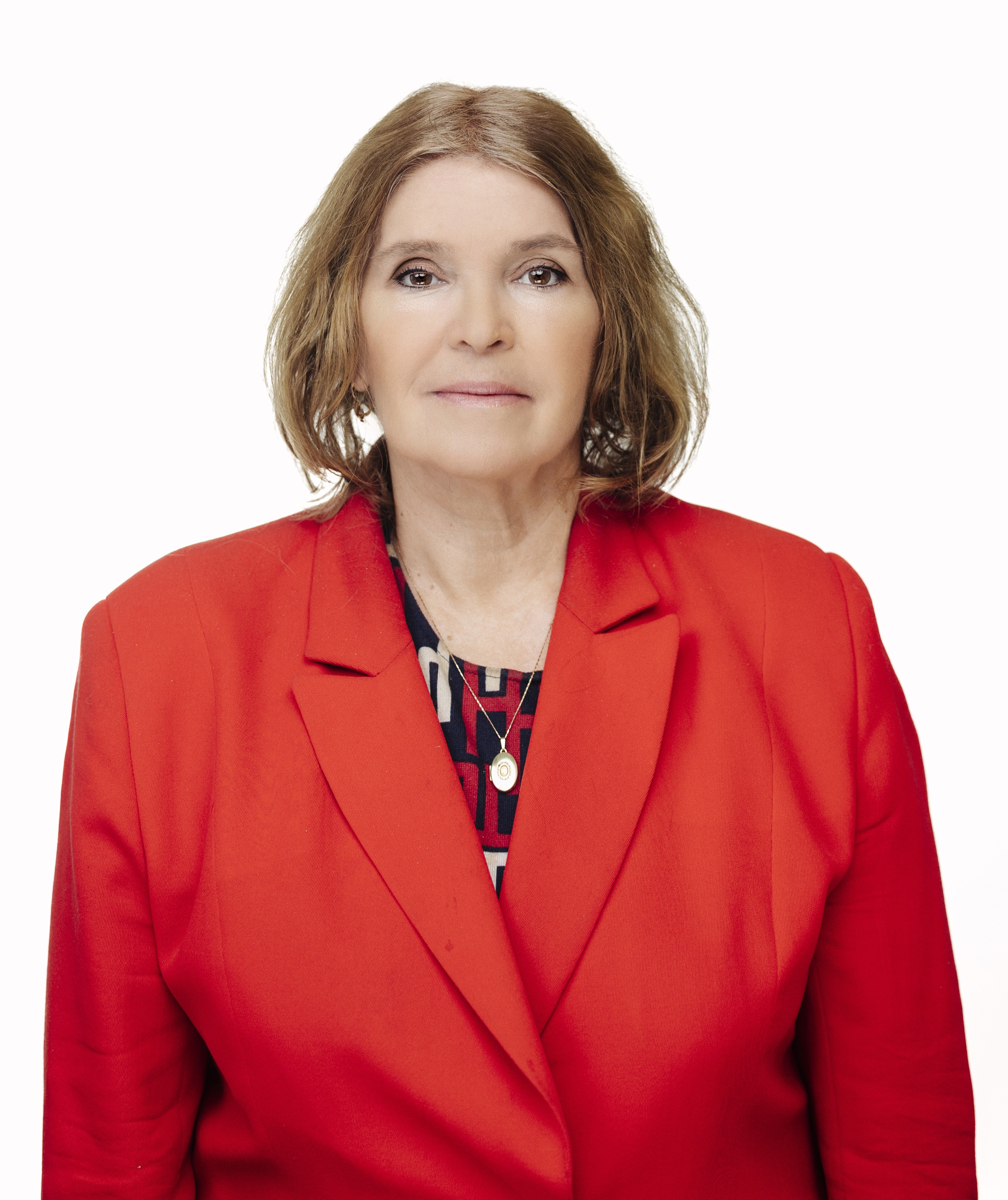

Member of the Senate
- Incumbent
- Assumed office 13 November 2023

Member of the Sejm
- In office 8 November 2011 – 11 November 2015; 12 November 2019 – 12 November 2023

Personal details
- Born: 19 April 1956 (age 69) Warsaw, Poland
- Party: Democratic Left Alliance (since 2006)

Małgorzata Helena Sekuła-Szmajdzińska (born 19 April 1956) is a Polish lawyer and politician.

== Biography ==
Born in Warsaw, she moved to Wrocław at a young age. She studied at University of Wrocław, and as a lawyer she worked at the Ministry of Justice.

== Electoral history ==
She ran unsuccessfully to the Warsaw city council in 2006, but in 2010 she was elected to the council. In 2011 she was elected to the Sejm. In 2015, despite getting individual votes, she was not elected as the Democratic Left Alliance did not pass the electoral threshold as a list. In May 2019 she ran for MeP, but was not elected. She was elected to the Sejm again in October 2019.

Sejm
| Election | Party | Votes | % | Constituency | Elected? |
| 2011 | Democratic Left Alliance | 15,883 | 4.61 | Legnica | Yes |
| 2015 | United Left | 17,800 | 4.99 | Legnica | No |
| 2019 | Democratic Left Alliance | 41,480 | 9.59 | Legnica | Yes |

== Private life ==
She is the widow of Jerzy Szmajdziński, who died in Smolensk air disaster. The couple has two children, Agnieszka and Andrzej.
