= Marek Dyduch =

Polish politician (born 1957)

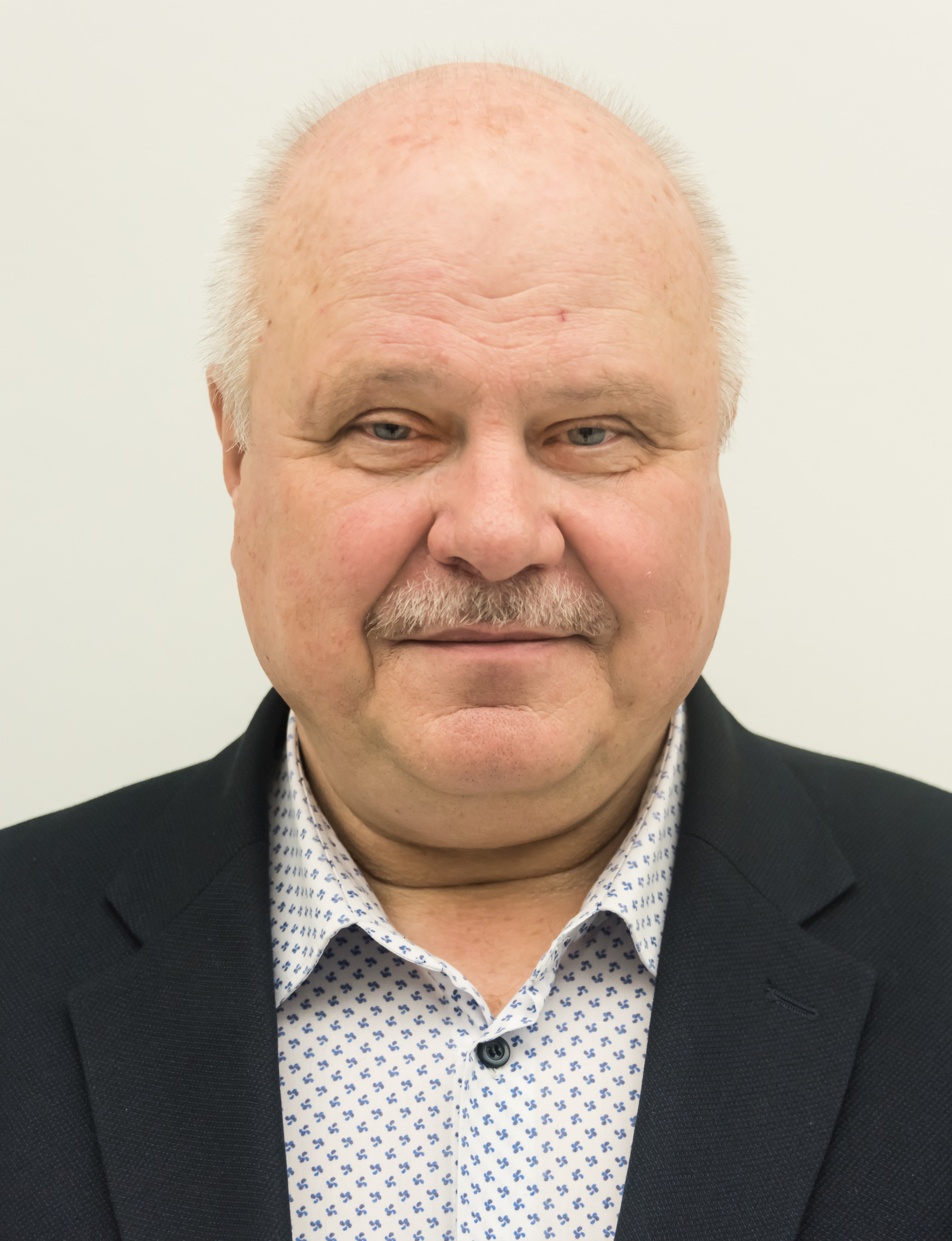
- Marek Dyduch (2022)

Member of the Sejm, II, III, IV, and IX terms
- In office 1993–2005
- In office 2019–2023

Deputy Minister of Treasury
- In office 2001–2002

Personal details
- Born: August 27, 1957 (age 69) Świdnica
- Party: PZPR, SdRP, SLD, New Left
- Education: University of Wrocław
- Occupation: Politician

Marek Dyduch (born August 27, 1957, in Świdnica) is a Polish politician who served as a Member of the Sejm of the Republic of Poland in the II, III, IV, and IX terms. He was also the Secretary of State at the Ministry of State Treasury from 2001 to 2002 and the general secretary of the SLD from 2002 to 2005.

== Biography ==
In 1991, he graduated in law from the Faculty of Law and Administration at the University of Wrocław. He completed postgraduate studies in management and marketing at the Higher School of Management and Entrepreneurship in Wałbrzych (1997) and in real estate valuation at the Wrocław University of Environmental and Life Sciences (2007). In the 1980s, he joined the Polish United Workers' Party. From 1986 to 1991, he served as the chairman of the provincial board of the Polish United Workers' Party in Wałbrzych. From 1990, he was active in the Social Democracy of the Republic of Poland, and in 1999, he joined the Democratic Left Alliance.

From 1993 to 2005, he served as a member of the Sejm for the II, III, and IV terms representing the SLD, elected in the Wałbrzych constituencies: district No. 48 and No. 2. Additionally, from 1998 to 2000, he held the position of a councilor in the Lower Silesian Voivodeship Sejmik and led the SLD councilors' club. In 2005, he unsuccessfully ran for the Senate seat from district No. 2. From 2001 to 2002, he served as the Secretary of State at the Ministry of Treasury in Leszek Miller's government. On February 23, 2002, he was elected Secretary-General of the SLD (he was re-elected to this position in 2003 and 2004), at which point he resigned from the position of Deputy Minister. On May 29, 2005, he resigned from the position of Secretary-General. After leaving parliament, he engaged in his own business activities.

In 2006, he was elected as a councilor of the Lower Silesian Regional Assembly representing the coalition of the Left and Democrats. In September 2007, he left the SLD after not being placed on the LiD's candidate list for parliament. In March 2008, he co-founded a separate group of councilors for the Polish People's Party in the regional assembly. In January 2010, he returned to the SLD, and the following month, he left the PSL group in the regional assembly. That same year, he was again elected as a regional councilor and assumed the position of chairman of the SLD-PSL councilors' club. In 2011, he unsuccessfully ran for a parliamentary seat. In 2014, he retained his seat in the regional assembly for another term. In 2015, he ran for parliament again as the leader of the Wałbrzych electoral list of the United Left (this coalition did not exceed the electoral threshold). In 2018, he unsuccessfully ran for re-election in the regional assembly.

In January 2019, the Mayor of Wrocław, Jacek Sutryk, appointed him as his social advisor for the development of the Wrocław agglomeration. In the parliamentary elections of the same year, Marek Dyduch again obtained a parliamentary seat representing the SLD. In the 9th term of the Sejm, he became the deputy chairman of the Committee on Environmental Protection, Natural Resources, and Forestry. In October 2021, he was elected as the vice-chairman of the New Left, formed from the transformation of the SLD. In 2023, he unsuccessfully ran for re-election to parliament. In 2024, he once again ran in the regional assembly elections.

== Electoral history ==
Elections	Party	District	Result
1993	Democratic Left Alliance	Sejm II	9113 (3.53%)
1997	Democratic Left Alliance	Sejm III	27,097 (11.35%)
2001	Democratic Left Alliance – Labour Union	Sejm IV	33,287 (14.11%)
2005	Democratic Left Alliance	Sejm VI	36,564 (18.78%)
2011	Democratic Left Alliance	Sejm VII	7,950 (3.53%)
2015	United Left	Sejm VIII	7,370 (3.15%)
2019	Democratic Left Alliance	Sejm IX	14,451 (5.11%)
2023	New Left	Sejm X	7,507 (2.32%)
