= Krzysztof Janik =

Polish politician

Krzysztof Jan Janik
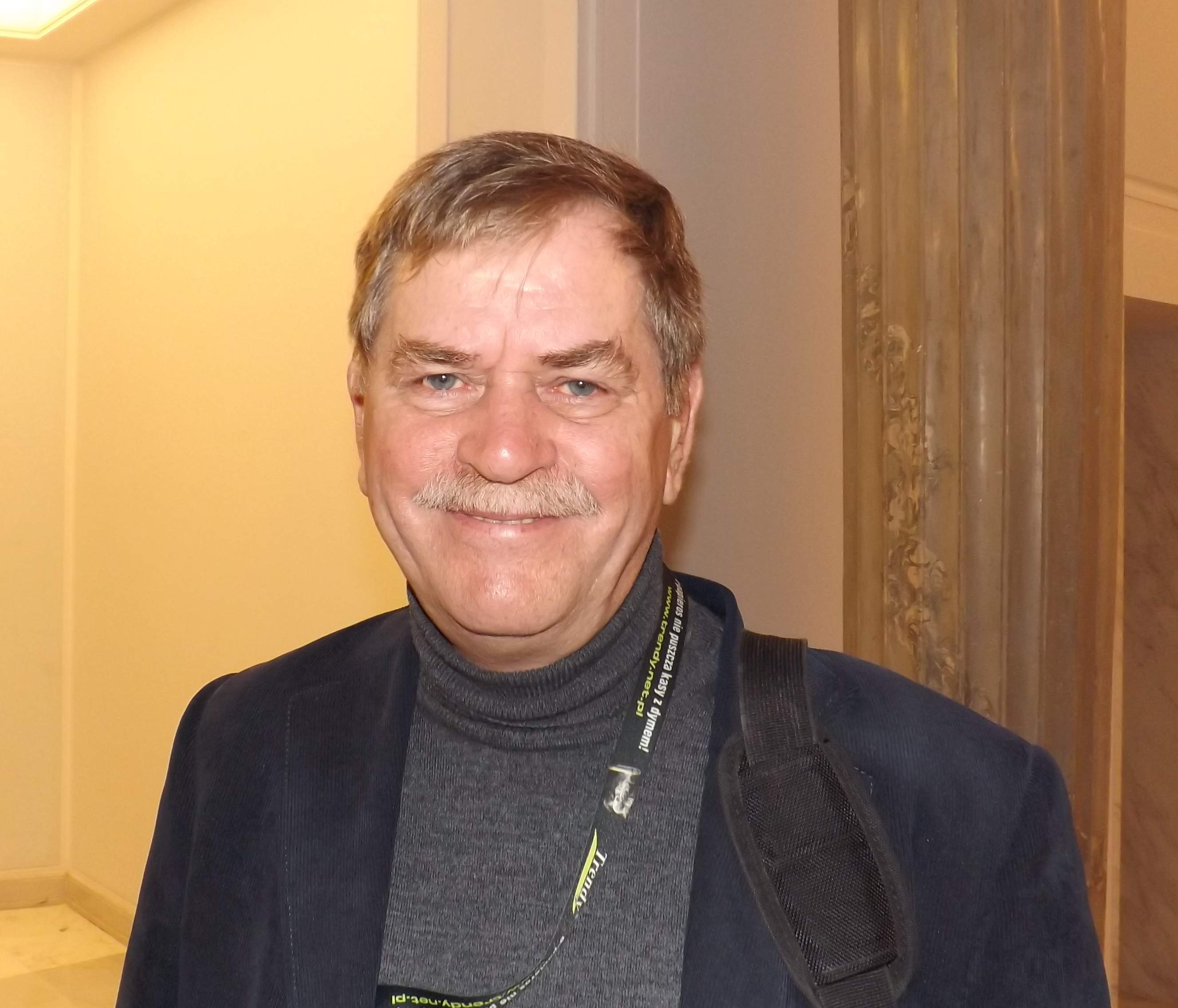

Minister of Interior and Administration
- In office 19 October 2001 – 21 January 2004
- President: Aleksander Kwaśniewski
- Prime Minister: Leszek Miller
- Preceded by: Marek Biernacki
- Succeeded by: Józef Oleksy

Leader of Democratic Left Alliance
- In office 4 March 2004 – 18 December 2004
- Preceded by: Leszek Miller
- Succeeded by: Józef Oleksy

Member of the Sejm, II, III and IV
- In office 14 October 1993 – 18 October 2005

Personal details
- Born: 11 June 1950 (age 75) Kielce, Poland
- Party: Polish United Worker's Party (1968–1990); Social Democracy of the Republic of Poland (1990–1999); Democratic Left Alliance (1999–)
- Profession: Political scientist

Krzysztof Jan Janik (pronounced [ˈkʂɨʂtɔf ˈjanik]; born 11 June 1950 in Kielce) is a Polish left-wing politician. He is a member of the Democratic Left Alliance and from 6 March 2004 to 18 December 2004 was the leader of this party.

He was Ministers of Internal Affairs and Administration from 2001 to 2004 when he resigned. He was also a member of the parliament from 1993 to 2005.
