= Social Democratic Youth Federation (Poland) =

Youth-wing of Democratic Left Alliance in Poland

Social Democratic Youth Federation Federacja Młodych Socjaldemokratów
- Leader: Adam Wojech
- Secretary General: Artur Jaskulski
- Founded: 2003
- Merger of: Youth Left Alliance; Association of the Young Democratic Left
- Headquarters: Warsaw, Poland
- Membership: 10,000
- Ideology: Social democracy
- Colours: Red
- Mother party: Democratic Left Alliance
- International affiliation: International Union of Socialist Youth
- European affiliation: Young European Socialists
- Website: mlodzisocjaldemokraci.pl

The Social Democratic Youth Federation (Polish: Federacja Młodych Socjaldemokratów, FMS) was the youth wing of the Democratic Left Alliance.

== History ==
The FMS was established in 2003 from the merger of the Youth Left Alliance and the Association of the Young Democratic Left.

== Aim ==
In its mission statement, FMS sought to promote among young people the ideas of equality of freedom, social justice, ecological and active lifestyle. The FMS was against xenophobia, fascism, intolerance, violations of democratic principles and human rights.
