= Stanisław Rydzoń =

Polish politician (born 1950)

Member of the Sejm
- In office 19 October 2001 – 7 November 2011
- Constituency: 12 – Chrzanów

Personal details
- Born: 1950 (age 75–76)
- Party: Democratic Left Alliance

Stanisław Rydzoń (born 8 March 1950 in Brzezinka) is a Polish politician. He was elected to Sejm on 25 September 2005, getting 7,787 votes in 12 Chrzanów district as a candidate from Democratic Left Alliance list.

He was also a member of Sejm 2001-2005.

== See also ==
- Members of Polish Sejm 2005-2007
