= Andrzej Celiński =

Polish politician (born 1950)

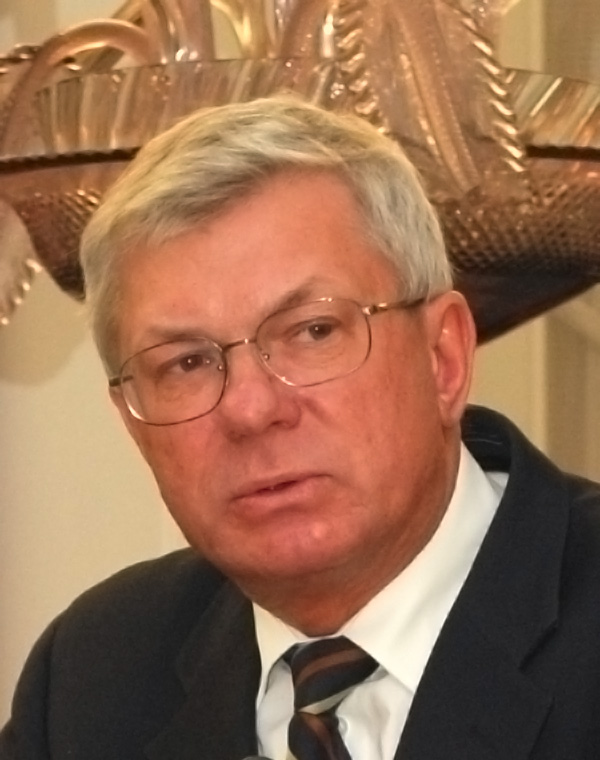
Andrzej Celiński

Andrzej Bohdan Celiński (pronounced [ˈandʐɛj t͡sɛˈlij̃skʲi]; born 26 February 1950 in Warsaw) is a Polish politician. Until 1989 activist of the democratic opposition in Poland. Former Member of Senate and Sejm. Minister of Culture in the government of Prime Minister Leszek Miller (2001-2002).

He was a member of Social Democracy of Poland (SdPl), and previously Democratic Left Alliance and Freedom Union. As Sejm Member he was a member of Left and Democrats caucus.

He is a graduate of University of Warsaw (social sciences). After this he became a prominent member of independent scouting movement, Workers' Defence Committee and later Solidarity. He was one of the leaders of independence movement during the communist time in Poland. From September 1980 he was the secretary of the Inter-Enterprise Strike Committee in Gdansk, and then head of the cabinet for the Chairman of Solidarity Lech Wałęsa. Arrested after declaration of martial law in Poland on 13 Debcember 1981; he was incarcerated for 12 months until 7 December 1982. In years 1983-1989 he was a close advisor to Lech Wałęsa.

He took part in the Round Table Negotiations that lasted from February to April 1989. Elected Senator from Solidarity he served from 1989 to 1993 (two terms). He later became Sejm member (1993-2005).

Originally a member of the Democratic Union and Freedom Union, where he was a member of left-wing, be joined Democratic Left Alliance (SLD) in 1999.

He was one of the party vice chairmen. After SLD electoral victory he was named Minister of Culture in Leszek Miller's cabinet. He served in the government from 19 October 2001 until 6 July 2002.

He left SLD with a group of fellow MP's, led by Sejm Marshal Marek Borowski and created new party - SdPl. He lost re-election to Sejm in 2005 and SdPl lost all seat as well. However, after SLD, SdPl, Labor Union and Democratic Party created coalition Lewica i Demokraci, he returned to the Sejm.

Celiński is a nephew of Jan Józef Lipski, socialist and opposition leader.
