= Grzegorz Napieralski =

Polish politician (born 1974)

Grzegorz Bernard Napieralski
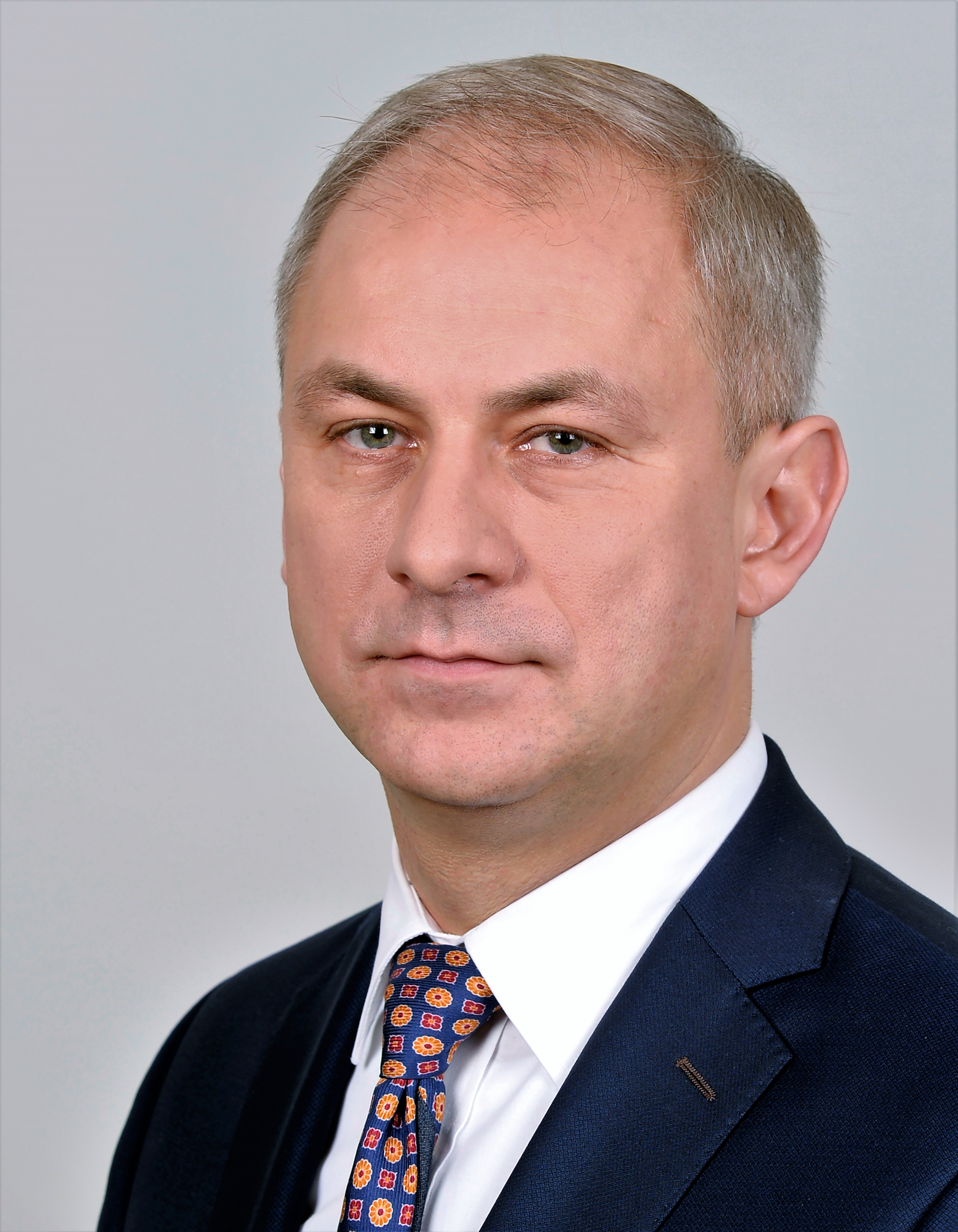

Leader of the Democratic Left Alliance
- In office 31 May 2008 – 10 December 2011
- Preceded by: Wojciech Olejniczak
- Succeeded by: Leszek Miller

Member of Sejm
- Incumbent
- Assumed office 12 November 2019
- Constituency: 41-Szczecin
- In office June 24, 2004 – 12 November 2015
- Constituency: 41-Szczecin

Member of the Senate
- In office 12 November 2015 – 12 November 2019
- Constituency: 98 - West Pomeranian

Personal details
- Born: March 18, 1974 (age 52) Szczecin, Poland
- Party: Democratic Left Alliance (1995–2015); Polish Initiative (since 2019)
- Other political affiliations: Left and Democrats (2006–2008); Civic Coalition (since 2019)
- Spouse: Małgorzata Napieralska
- Education: University of Szczecin
- Profession: Political scientist

Grzegorz Bernard Napieralski (pronounced [ˈɡʐɛɡɔʂ napjɛˈralski]; born March 18, 1974) is a Polish politician. He is an MP (member of the Sejm) and was chairman of the Democratic Left Alliance (SLD) from 2008 to 2011.

== Education and political career ==
Napieralski was born in Szczecin in 1974. After graduating from mechanics school in Szczecin, Napieralski studied Political Science at the University of Szczecin, obtaining his master's degree in 2000. From 1995 to 1999 he was the secretary of Szczecin division of Social Democracy of the Republic of Poland, which later became the Democratic Left Alliance. In 2002 he became the aide to the Voivode in West Pomeranian Voivodeship. In 2004, he was elected to Sejm, taking the place of Bogusław Liberadzki, who became a member of the European Parliament. Napieralski was subsequently elected again in 2005, 2007 and 2011.

In 2004 Napieralski became the vice-chairman of the SLD and a year later its secretary general. On May 31, 2008, he was chosen the new chairman of the Democratic Left Alliance, defeating Wojciech Olejniczak. From 2009 to 2011 he was also chairman of the Lewica parliamentary fraction.

On April 22, 2010, the Democratic Left Alliance chose Napieralski to replace Jerzy Szmajdziński, who had died in a plane crash, as its candidate in the upcoming presidential election. Napieralski finished third, receiving 13.68% of the votes, and did not advance to the second round of the election.

On December 10, 2011, in the wake of what was perceived to be his party's electoral failure, he was succeeded by Leszek Miller as the party chairman.

On January 9, 2015, he was suspended from the SLD. He decided, however, that the decision was illegal, and sued the chairman of the party in a court of law. On March 30 the same year he was suspended by the court party for three years in performing party. On June 22 has been hung up by the court party. Five days later, however, occurred with the Democratic Left Alliance. On June 29 he joined The Whites and Reds party.

== Political positions ==
Napieralski called for withdrawing Polish troops from Afghanistan as quickly as possible. He also supports more progressive taxation. He is in favor of liberalizing the abortion law in Poland and of government reimbursement of in vitro fertilization and contraception. He supports same sex civil unions, although he opposes adoption of children by such pairs. He is a supporter of separation of church and state and criticizes the Catholic Church's privileged position in Poland.

== Personal life ==
He is married to Małgorzata Napieralska (née Juras) has one daughter, Alicja and one son, Daniel.

== See also ==
- Members of Polish Sejm 2005-2007
- List of Polish senators (2015–2019)

Party political offices
Preceded by Wojciech Olejniczak	Chairman of the Democratic Left Alliance; 2008-2011	Succeeded by Leszek Miller
