= Wojciech Pomajda =

Polish politician

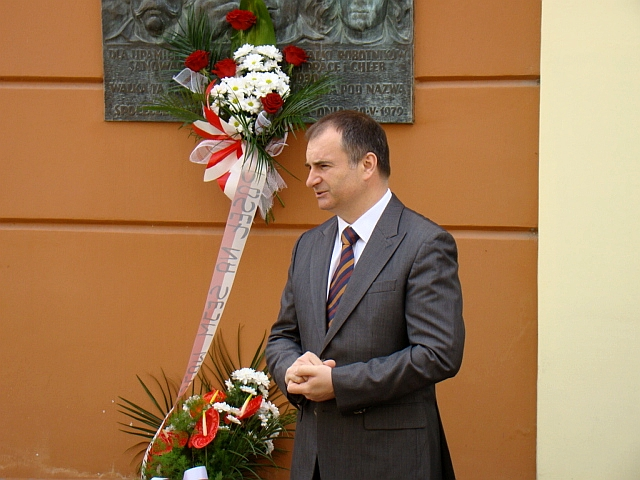

member of Sejm 2005-2007
- In office 18 October 2005 – 7 November 2011

Personal details
- Born: 1968 (age 57–58)
- Party: Democratic Left Alliance

Wojciech Tadeusz Pomajda (born August 18, 1968, in Przemyśl) is a Polish politician. He was elected to the Sejm on September 25, 2005, receiving 6622 votes in the 22nd Krosno district. Pomajda was the candidate of the party Democratic Left Alliance.

== See also ==
- Members of Polish Sejm 2005-2007
