= 2010 Polish presidential election =

- 20 June 2010 (first round); 4 July 2010 (second round)
- Turnout: 54.92% (first round) ▲5.20pp 55.30% (second round) ▲4.32pp
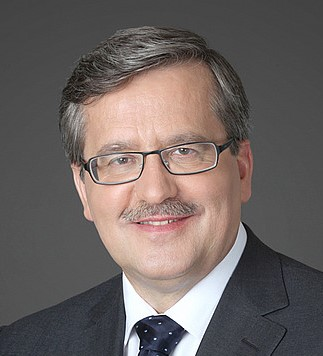

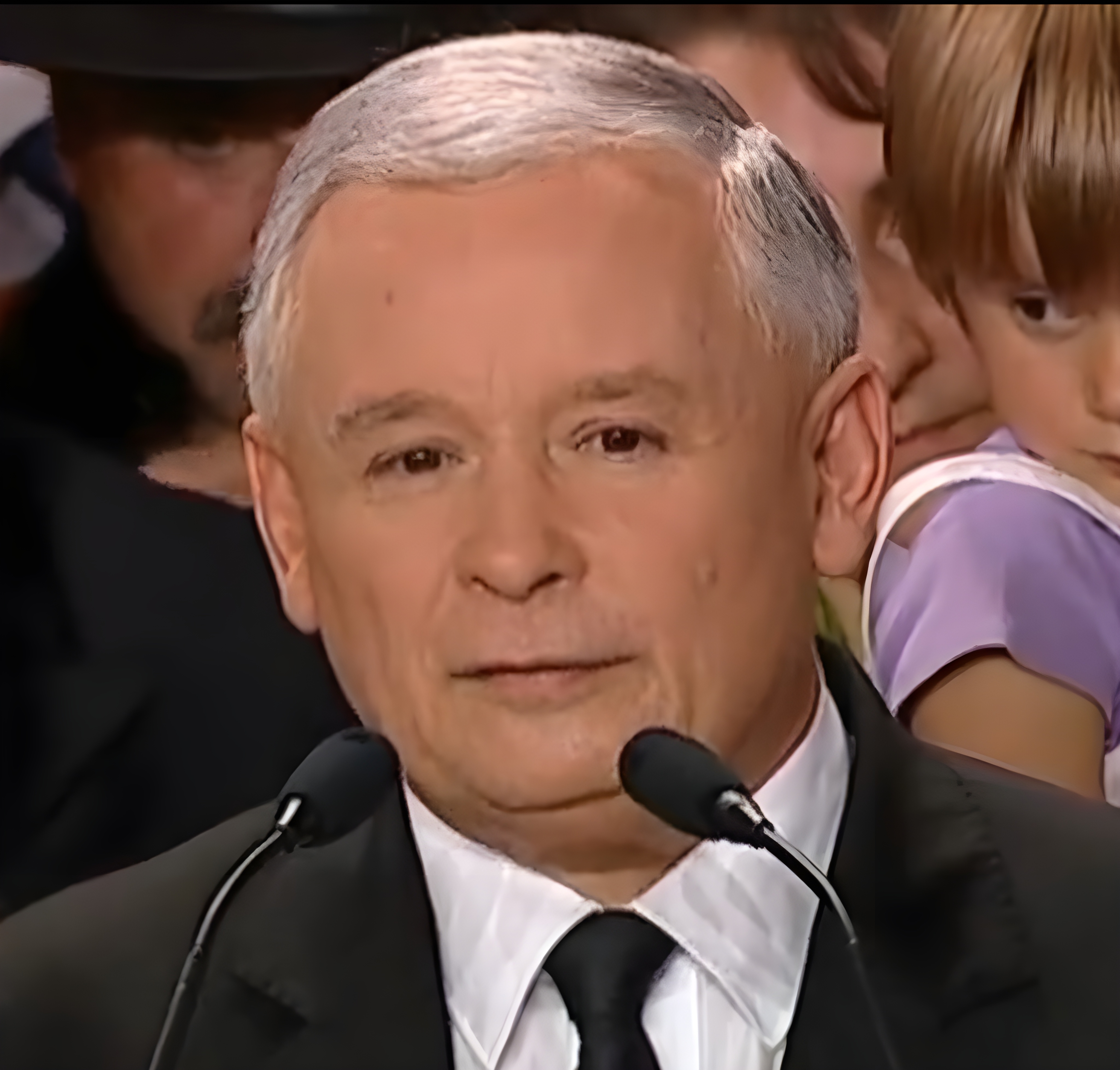
| Nominee | Bronisław Komorowski | Jarosław Kaczyński |
| Party | PO | PiS |
| Popular vote | 8,933,887 | 7,919,134 |
| Percentage | 53.01% | 46.99% |
- Second round results by powiat
President before election
Bronisław Komorowski (acting) (Note: Komorowski, the incumbent Marshal of the Sejm, became Acting President on 10 April 2010 after the death of Lech Kaczyński. He resigned from both offices on 8 July 2010, after being confirmed as the winner of the election, leaving Marshal of the Senate Bogdan Borusewicz (Independent, PO caucus) as Acting President for less than a day. The Sejm reconvened later that same day to elect Grzegorz Schetyna (PO) as Marshal, and thus Acting President until Komorowski's inauguration on 6 August.)
PO
Elected President
Bronisław Komorowski
PO

Presidential elections were held in Poland on 20 June 2010. As no candidate received a majority of votes in the first round, a second round was held on 4 July 2010. Bronisław Komorowski, the acting President of Poland and vice-chairman of the Civic Platform, defeated Jarosław Kaczyński, twin brother of the recently deceased President Lech Kaczyński and chairman of Law and Justice (PiS). The 2008 financial crisis, flooding in Poland and the Smolensk disaster were the main themes in the last months of the election campaign.

As of 2026, this remains the last Polish presidential election won by a non PiS-aligned candidate and the only election won by a candidate from PO.

== Background ==
The 2010 presidential election was expected to be a rematch of the 2005 election between Lech Kaczyński and Donald Tusk. Since the last presidential election, Polish politics had become centered around the rivalry between Law and Justice and the Civic Platform. President Kaczyński and Prime Minister Tusk were constantly battling each other over who should represent Poland on the international stage. Tusk was leading Kaczyński in all the opinion polls (as he did ahead of the 2005 elections, which he ultimately lost) and the election was expected to be a dirty one. However, this rematch never came to be. Donald Tusk announced in January 2010 that he will not run for President because he wants to remain Prime Minister. Lech Kaczyński was set to declare his candidacy for re-election on 23 May but he died on 10 April in the Smolensk air disaster, while he was attending the remembrance for the 70th anniversary of the Katyn massacre.

After Donald Tusk declined to run for president, the Civic Platform organized a presidential primary. The primary was won by Bronisław Komorowski who defeated Radosław Sikorski receiving 68.5% of the vote to Sikorski's 31.5%. Bronisław Komorowski consistently lead Lech Kaczyński by double digits in the first round and by a 2-to-1 margin in the second round. No other candidate registered support in the double digits.

After President Lech Kaczyński's death in a plane crash, the Constitution required the Marshal of the Sejm to declare the date within two weeks, with the election to take place on a weekend within the following 60 days, i.e. 20 June at the latest. On 21 April, the Marshal, Bronisław Komorowski, announced the election date as 20 June 2010. Candidates were required to register by 26 April 2010 (with 1,000 signatures of voters in support) and submit 100,000 signatures by 6 May 2010.

Originally, Lech was up for re-election between 19 September and 3 October; the exact date would have been announced between 23 May and 23 June, before the end of his first five-year term of office.

Two candidates for the election died in the crash. Incumbent Lech Kaczyński was nominated as the Law and Justice party candidate (he had yet to accept the nomination, but it was widely believed that he would do so), and Jerzy Szmajdziński was to have run for the Democratic Left Alliance. Jarosław Kaczyński ran for president as the replacement for his deceased twin brother. Jerzy Szmajdziński's replacement was Grzegorz Napieralski.

Senate by-elections to fill the three seats whose senators died in the crash – Krystyna Bochenek (PO), Janina Fetlińska (PiS) and Stanisław Zając (PiS, himself elected in a by-election on 22 June 2008 to replace Andrzej Mazurkiewicz) – were held on the same day.

== Candidates ==
In total, 23 candidates registered with the Polish National Electoral Commission on, or just following, the 26 April deadline. 17 of the 23 candidacies were accepted by the commission, whilst the remaining 6 were rejected because they had not gathered the required 1000 signatures.

Only ten candidates collected the required 100,000 signatures and were eligible to run for president.

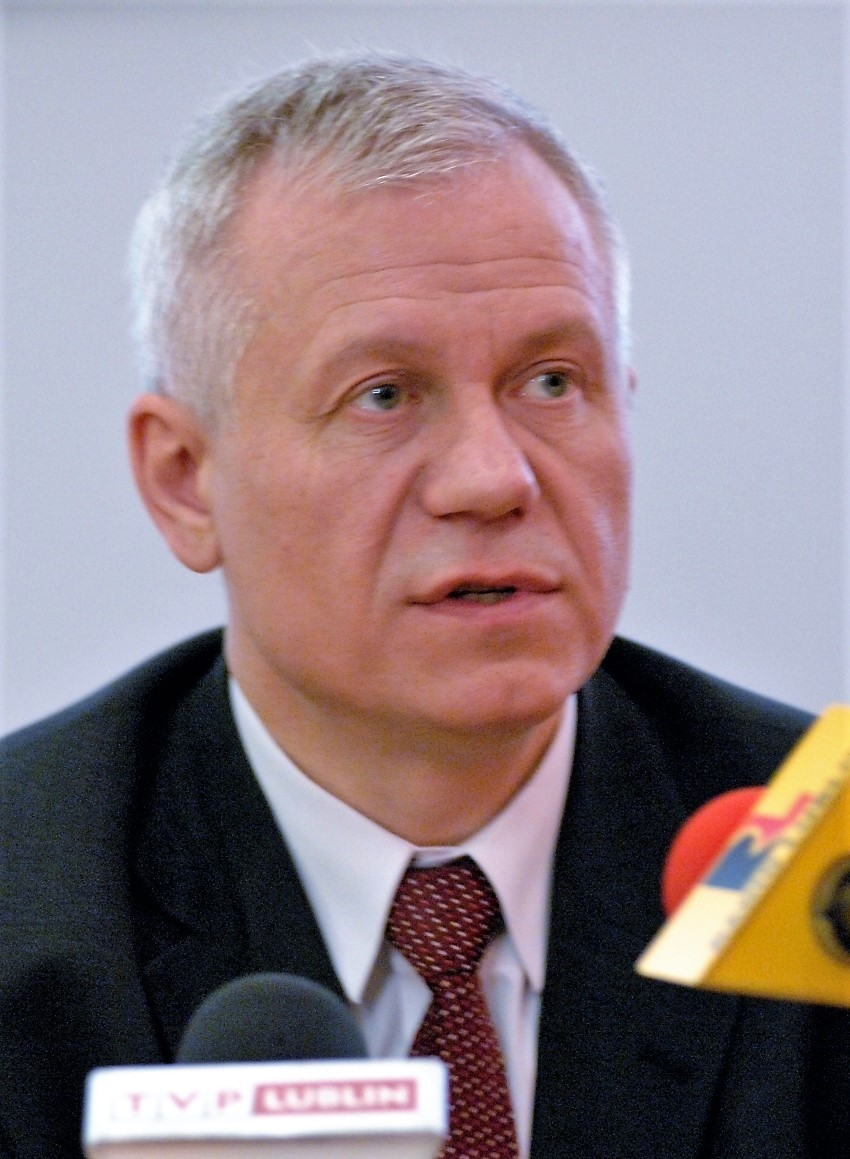
Former Marshal of the Sejm Marek Jurek (Right of the Republic), 49

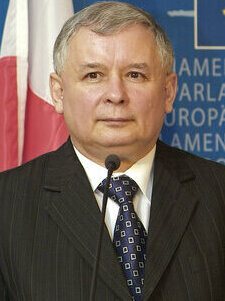
Former Prime Minister and PiS Chairman Jarosław Kaczyński (Law and Justice), 60

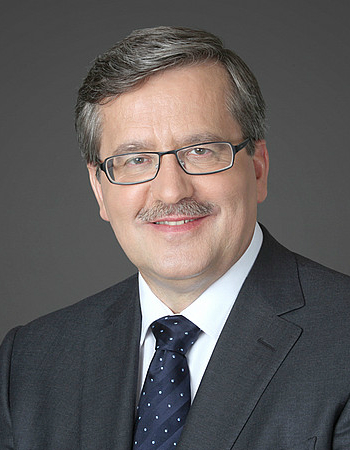
Marshal of the Sejm and Acting President Bronisław Komorowski (Civic Platform), 58

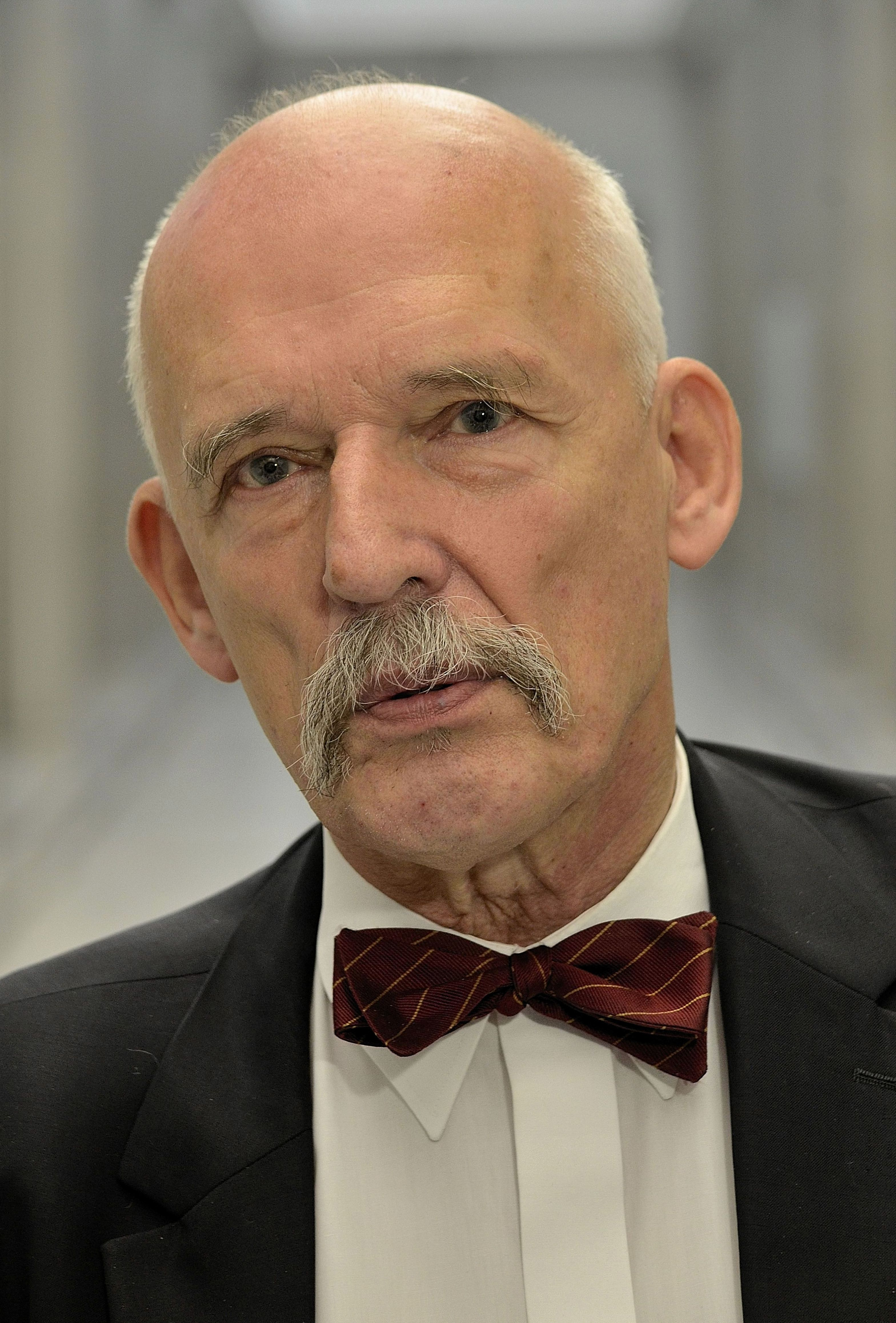
Former Member of the Sejm Janusz Korwin-Mikke (Liberty and Lawfulness), 67

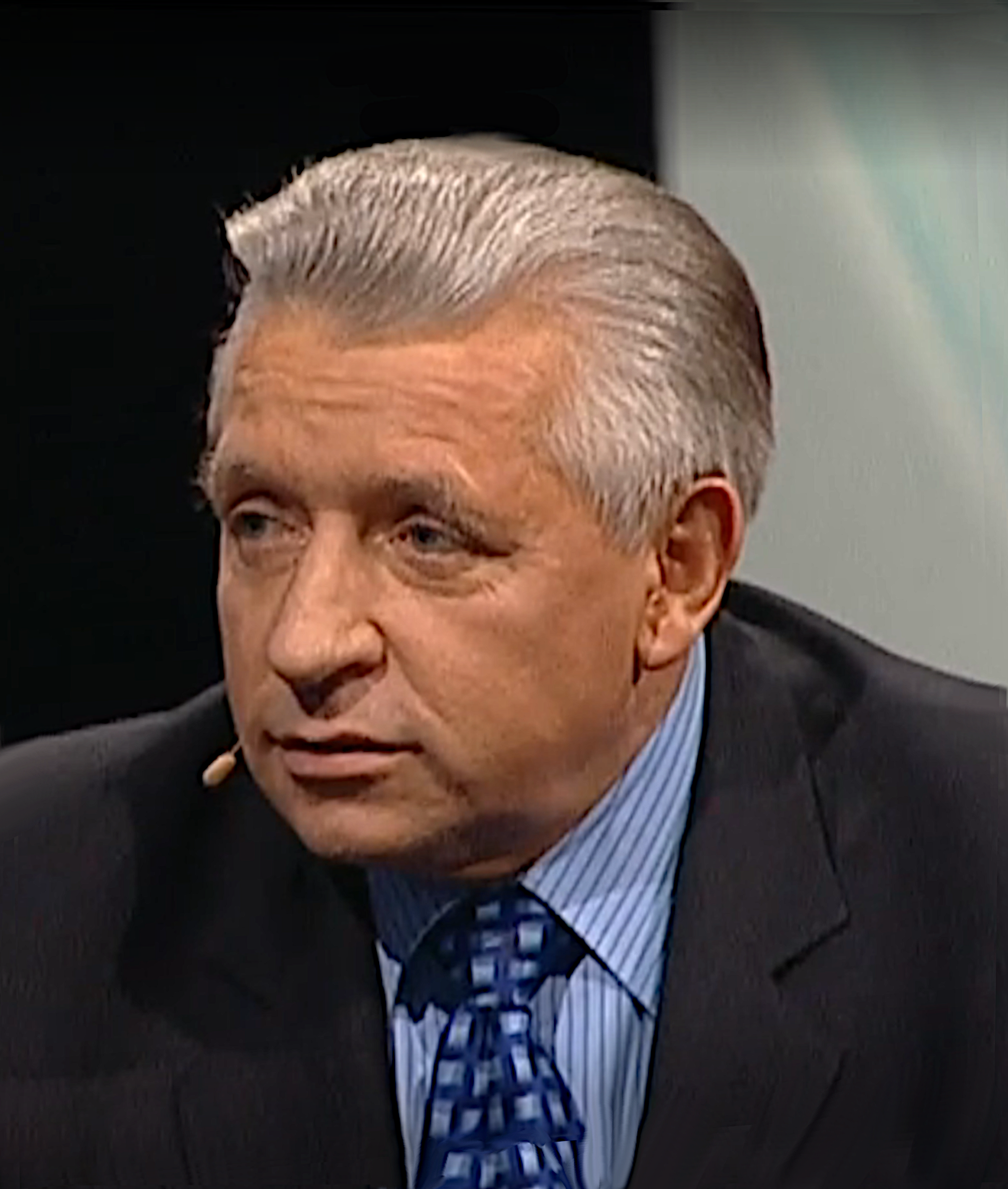
Former Deputy Prime Minister Andrzej Lepper (Self-Defence of the Republic of Poland), 55

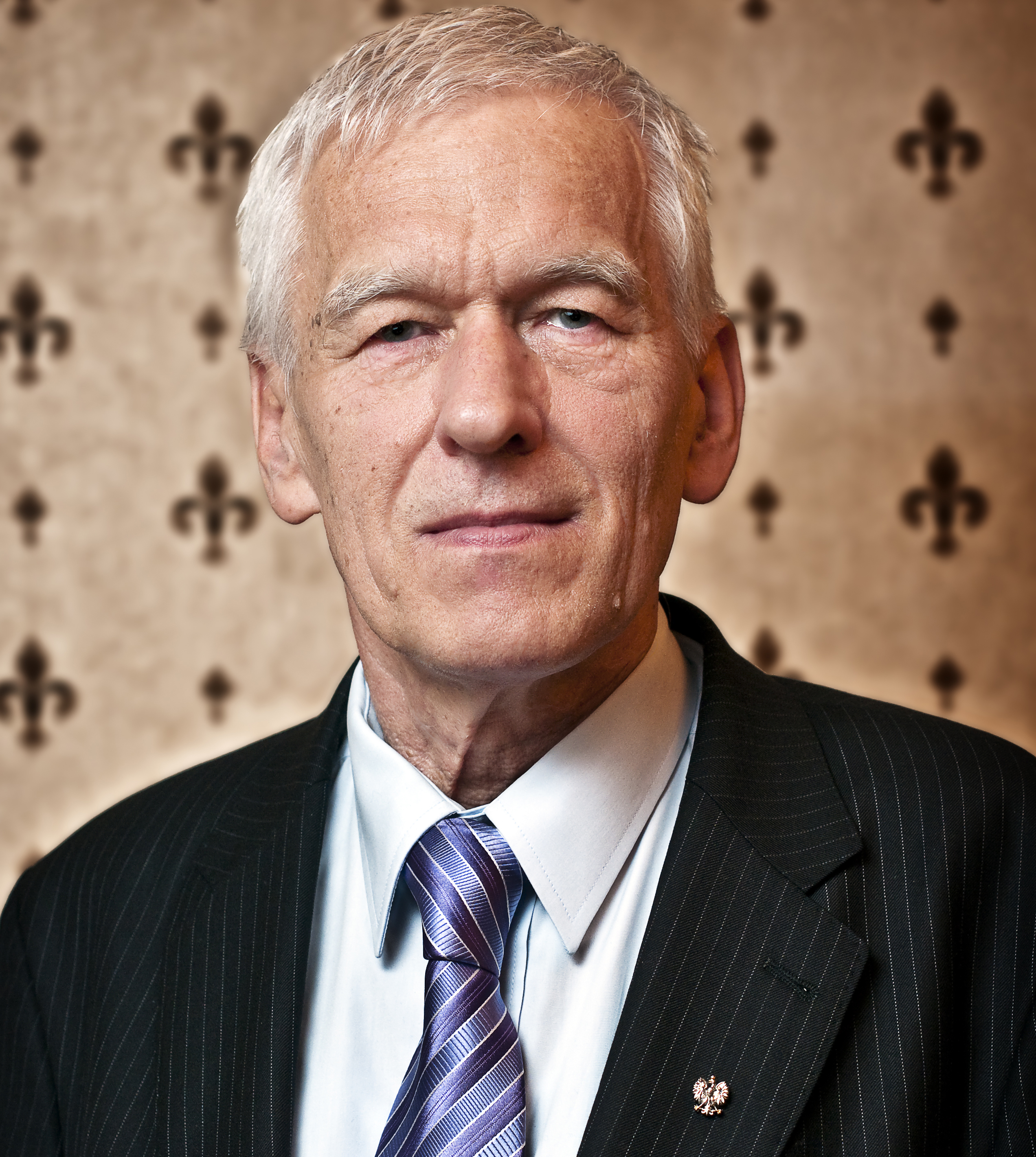
Founder and leader of Fighting Solidarity Kornel Morawiecki (Independent), 69

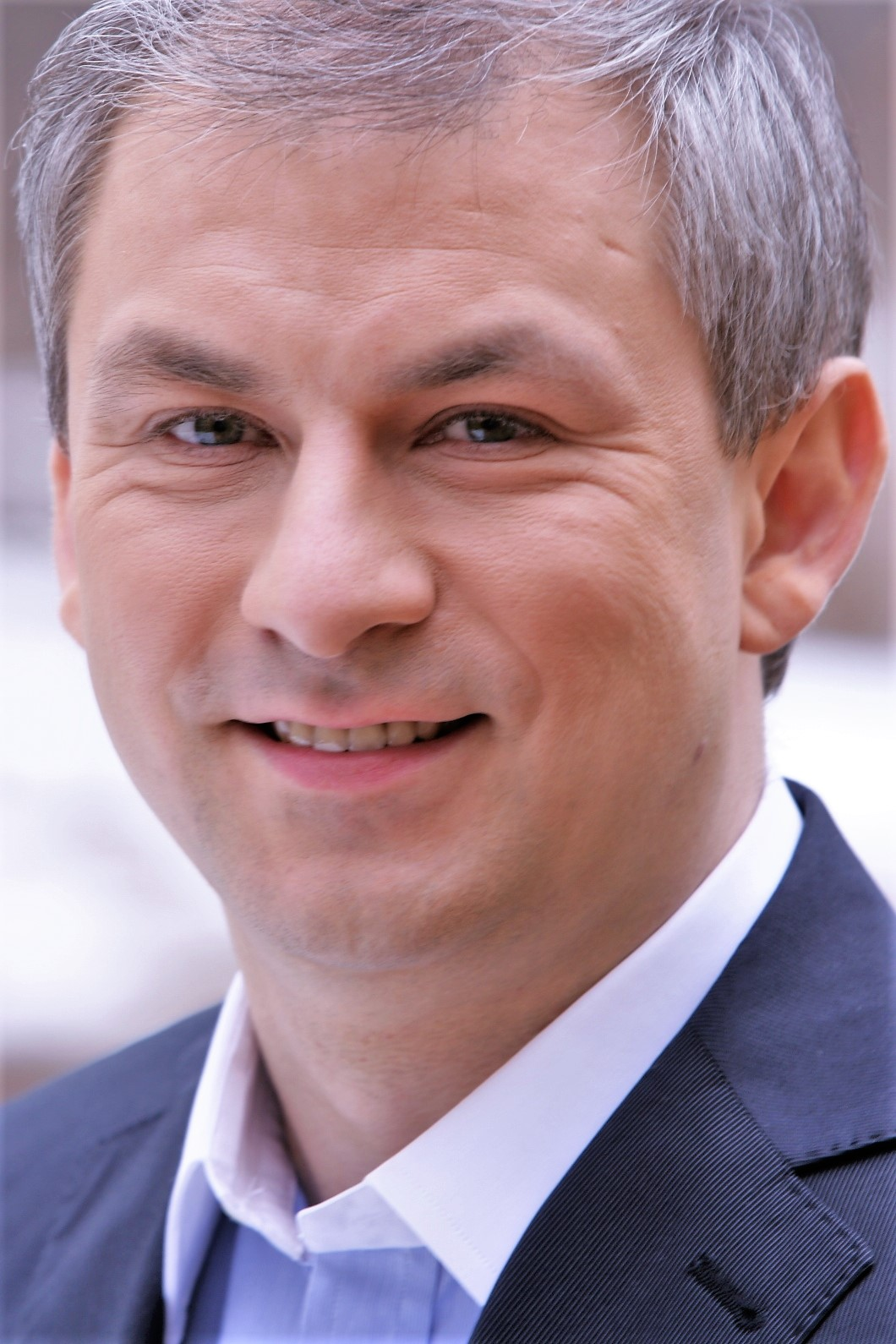
Party Chairman and Sejm Member Grzegorz Napieralski (Democratic Left Alliance), 36

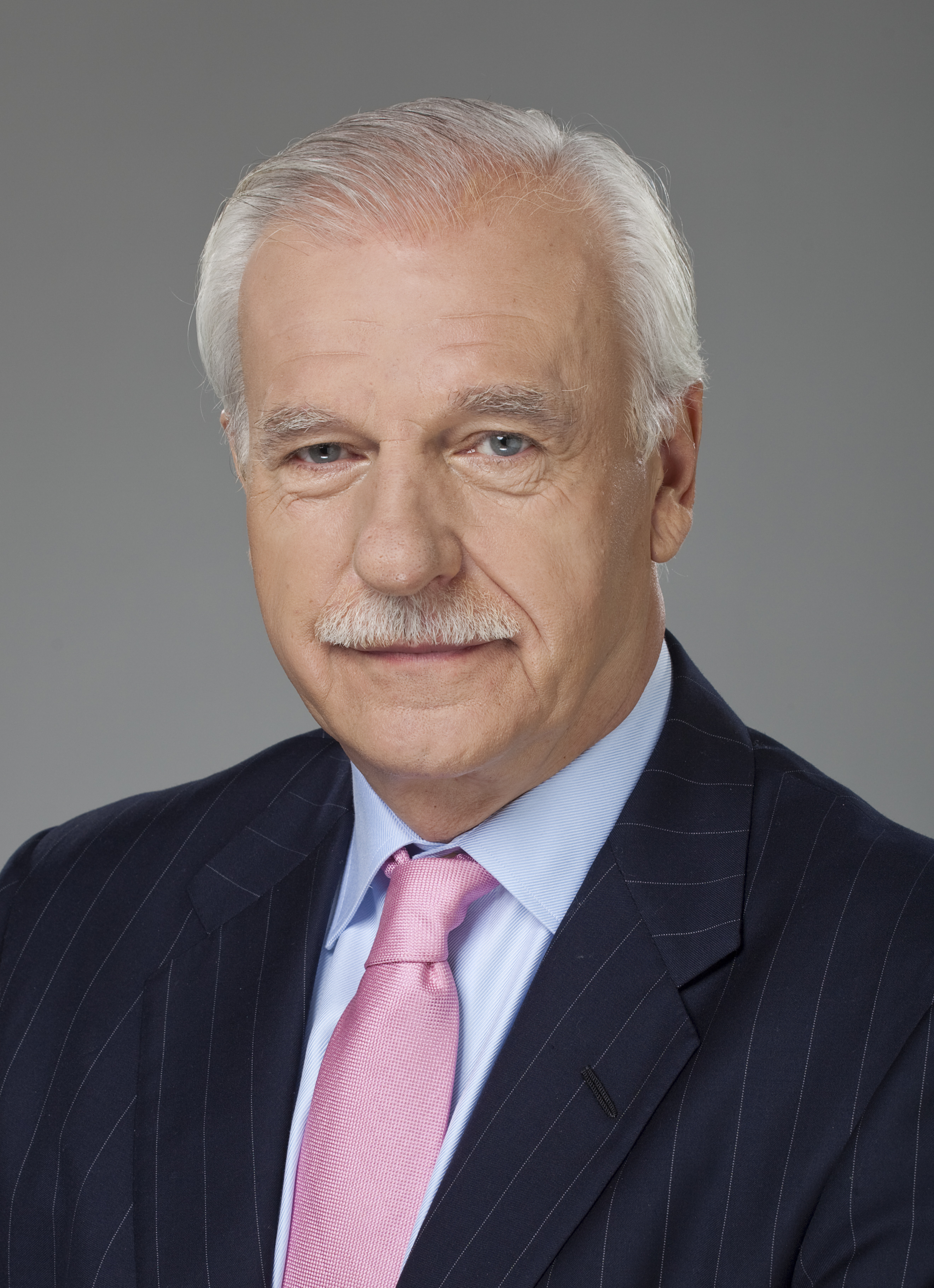
Former Minister of Foreign Affairs Andrzej Olechowski (Independent), 62

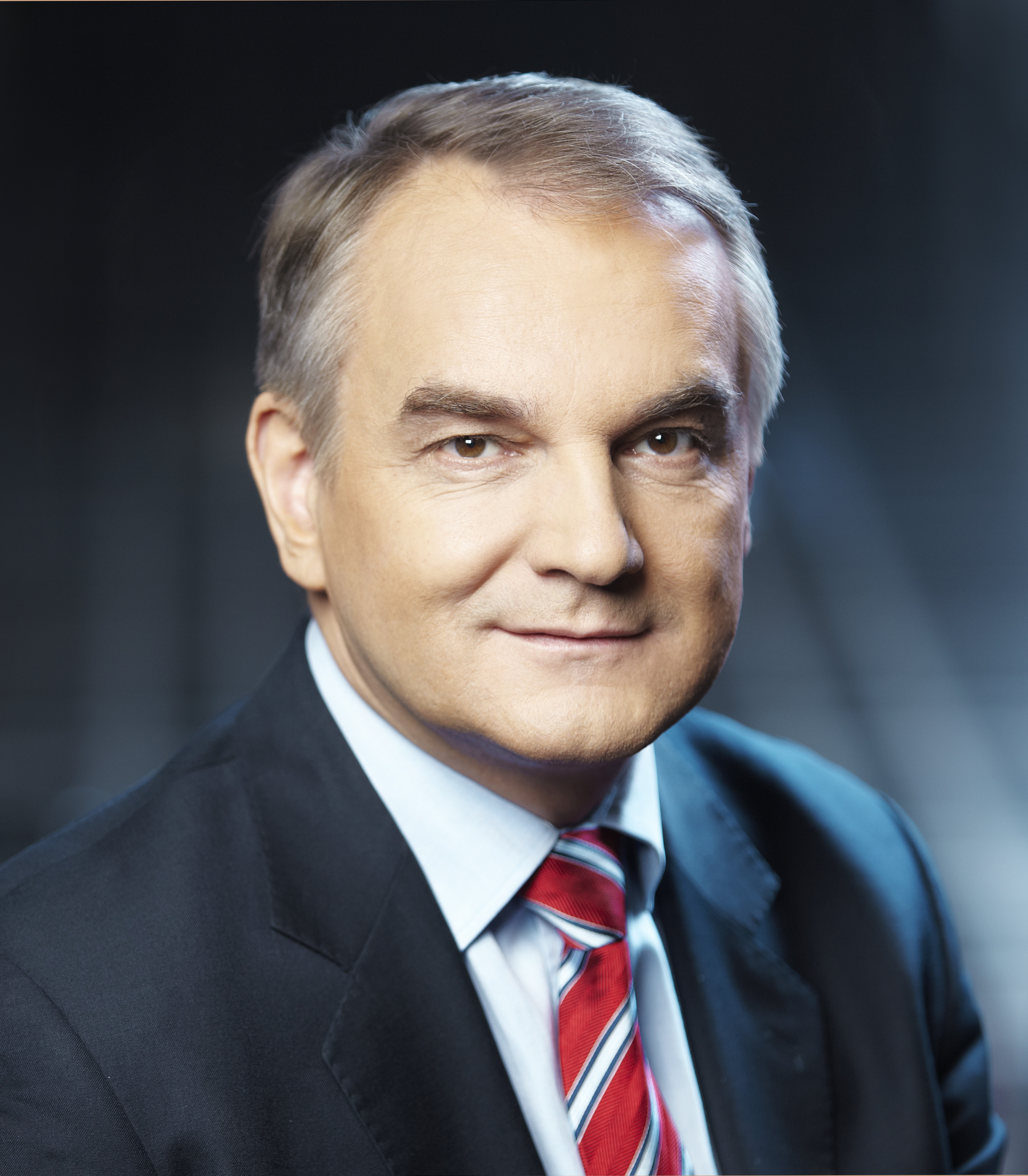
Former Prime Minister and current Deputy Prime Minister Waldemar Pawlak (Polish People's Party), 50

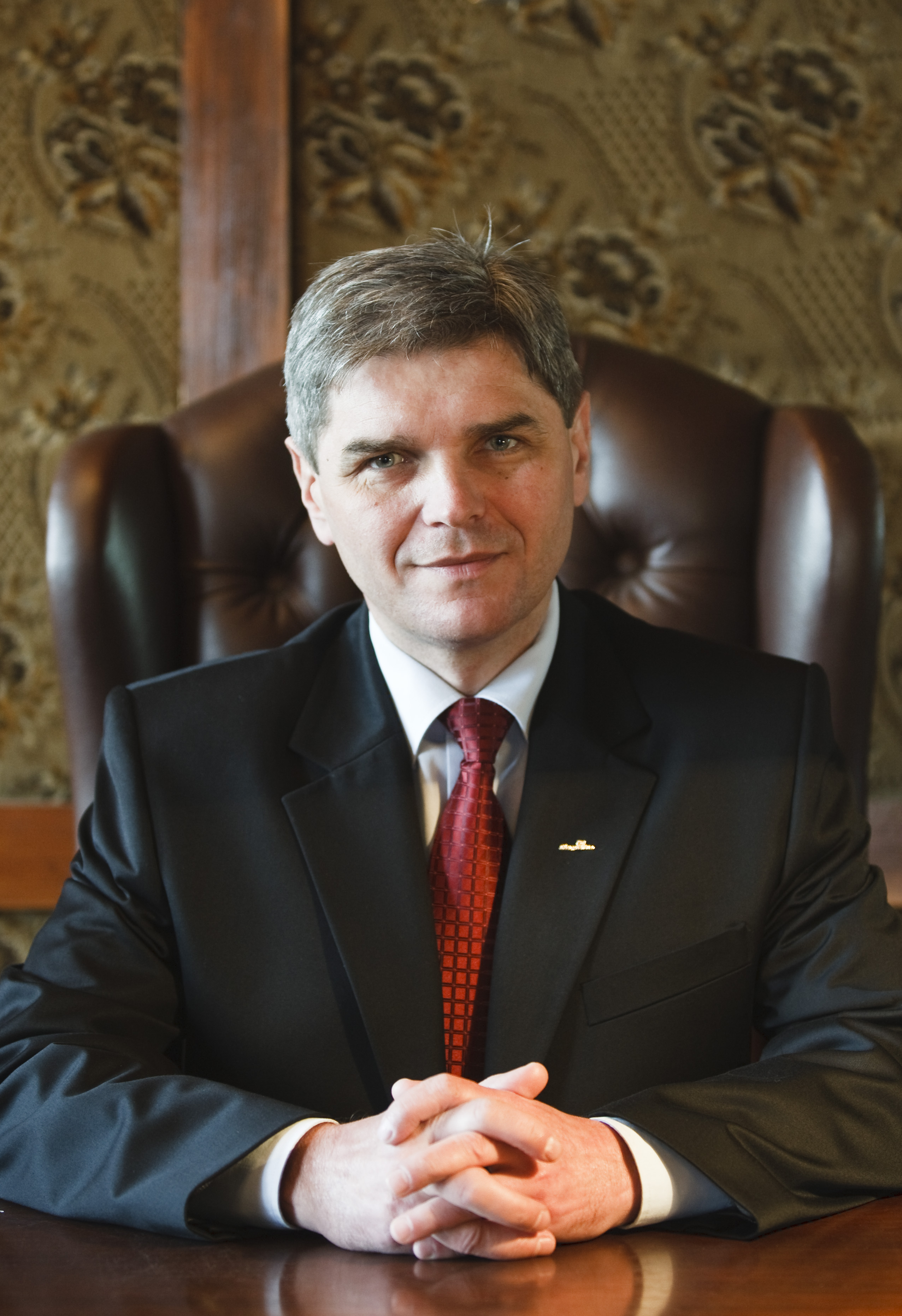
Chairman of Free Trade Union "August '80" Bogusław Ziętek (Polish Labour Party), 45

=== Rejected candidates ===
- Zdzisław Jankowski
- Gabriel Janowski – national-conservative, former Minister of Agriculture
- Dariusz Kosiur
- Bartłomiej Kurzeja – artist, self-described as "the National Sculptor"
- Krzysztof Mazurski – scientist, geographer
- Paweł Pietrzyk
- Roman Sklepowicz
- Paweł Soroka – political scientist
- Bogdan Szpryngiel – a former Libertas candidate to the European Parliament
- Ludwik Wasiak
- Józef Wójcik
- Waldemar Urbanowski

=== Withdrawn ===
- Ludwik Dorn – former Marshal of Sejm (Law and Justice), candidate of liberal-conservative party Poland Plus.
- Tomasz Nałęcz – former Vice-Marshal of Sejm, candidate of Social Democracy of Poland (SdPl).
- Zdzisław Podkański – former member of the European Parliament (Polish People's Party), leader of the national-conservative party Piast.

=== Dead ===
- Lech Kaczyński – President who applied to start for reelection. First candidate of Law and Justice.
- Jerzy Szmajdziński – former Minister of Defence, Vice-Marshal of Sejm. First candidate of Democratic Left Alliance.

== Campaign ==
Bronisław Komorowski's campaign slogan was "Unity builds" (Zgoda buduje) and his strategy was to portray himself as an independent politician ready to work with everyone to fix the nation's problems. He pledged to work closely with the government of Prime Minister Donald Tusk to adopt the euro in about five years, end the unpopular military mission in Afghanistan and promote pro-market reforms.

Jarosław Kaczyński's campaign slogan was "Poland is the most important" (Polska jest najważniejsza) and he aimed to soften his own image and present himself as someone ready for compromise. He praised his late twin brother's legacy and promised to continue his policies as President. He made it a priority to fight crime and corruption, scale back market reforms to preserve a strong welfare state and promote Roman Catholic values

== Opinion polls ==
=== Graphical summary ===
Graphical summary of the first round opinion polls: B. Komorowski J. Kaczyński G. Napieralski Waldemar Pawlak A. Olechowski Andrzej Lepper J. Korwin-Mikke ~~Lech Kaczyński~~

=== First round ===
| Polling firm/Link | Fieldwork date | Sample size | Komorowski PO | J. Kaczyński PiS | Napieralski SLD | Pawlak PSL | Olechowski ind. | Lepper SRP | Korwin-Mikke WiP | Jurek PR | Morawiecki ind. | Ziętek PPP | Others | Don't know | Lead |
|---|---|---|---|---|---|---|---|---|---|---|---|---|---|---|---|
| 2010 presidential election | Election result | 16,806,170 | 41.54 | 36.46 | 13.68 | 2.48 | 1.75 | 1.44 | 1.28 | 1.06 | 0.18 | 0.13 | | | 5.08 |
| Millward Brown SMG/KRC | 18 June | | 44 | 29 | 13 | 2 | 2 | 1 | 3 | 1 | 0 | 0 | | 5 | 15 |
| TNS OBOP | 17 June | | 42 | 35 | 13 | 2 | 2 | 1 | 3 | 1 | 0 | 0 | | | 7 |
| Millward Brown SMG/KRC | 16 June | 1,001 | 41 | 29 | 12 | 2 | 1 | 1 | 2 | 1 | | | | | 12 |
| GfK Polonia | 16 June | | 48 | 34 | 9 | 2 | 2 | 2 | 3 | 1 | 1 | 1 | | | 14 |
| CBOS | 10–16 June | 977 | 42 | 28 | 10 | 2 | 2 | 1 | 3 | 1 | 0 | 0 | | 8 | 14 |
| TNS OBOP | 10–15 June | 965 | 41 | 31 | 8 | 2 | 1 | 1 | 3 | 1 | 0 | 0 | | 12 | 10 |
| GfK Polonia | 12 June | | 42 | 29 | 11 | 4 | 1 | 1 | 2 | 1 | 0 | 0 | | 9 | 13 |
| SMG/KRC Millward Brown | 9 June | | 45 | 31 | 7 | 2 | 2 | 1 | 2 | 0 | 0 | 0 | | 5 | 14 |
| SMG/KRC Millward Brown | 7 June | | 43 | 32 | 8 | 3 | 2 | 1 | 2 | 1 | 0 | 1 | | 5 | 11 |
| Homo Homini | 5 June | | 46.5 | 32.4 | 6.1 | 4.4 | 2.2 | 0.6 | 0.4 | 0.4 | 0.1 | 0 | | 6.4 | 14.1 |
| SMG/KRC Millward Brown | 4 June | | 42 | 31 | 6 | 1 | 1 | 1 | 3 | 0 | 0 | 0 | | 15 | 11 |
| PBS DGA | 2 June | | 48 | 33 | 8 | 3 | 2 | 2 | 2 | 0 | 0 | 0 | | | 15 |
| SMG/KRC Millward Brown | 31 May | | 46 | 30 | 9 | 1 | 1 | 1 | 3 | 0 | 0 | 0 | | 5 | 16 |
| Homo Homini | 29 May | | 47.6 | 32.5 | 6.1 | 4.2 | 1.6 | 0.7 | 0.6 | 0.7 | 0.1 | 0.1 | | 5.6 | 15.1 |
| GfK Polonia | 22 May | | 53 | 28 | 4 | 3 | 4 | 4 | 3 | 1 | 0 | 0 | | | 25 |
| SMG/KRC Millward Brown | 17 May | | 49 | 29 | 3 | 2 | 3 | 3 | 1 | 1 | 0 | 0 | | 7 | 20 |
| Homo Homini | 15 May | | 42.2 | 35.9 | 4.7 | 5.7 | 2.3 | 0.6 | 0.7 | 1.9 | 0 | 0 | | 6 | 6.3 |
| GfK Polonia | 15 May | | 48 | 30 | 5 | 2 | 4 | 2 | 2 | 1 | 0 | 0 | | 6 | 18 |
| TNS OBOP | 7–10 May | 949 | 45 | 33 | 3 | 2 | 2 | 1 | 1 | 1 | | | 0 | 12 | 12 |
| GfK Polonia | 12 May | | 41 | 28 | 4 | 0 | 3 | 0 | 0 | 0 | 0 | 0 | | 16 | 13 |
| SMG/KRC Millward Brown | 10 May | | 45 | 34 | 5 | 4 | 3 | 1 | 2 | 1 | 0 | 0 | | | 11 |
| CBOS | 8–13 May | 1,000 | 50 | 27 | 5 | 3 | 3 | 2 | 2 | 1 | 0 | 0 | | 8 | 23 |
| TNS OBOP | 6 May | 1,000 | 50 | 36 | 4 | 3 | 2 | 2 | 1 | 1 | | | | | 14 |
| | 26 April | Jaroslaw Kaczyński enters the race | | | | | | | | | | | | | |
| | 10 April | Lech Kaczyński dies from plane crash | | | | | | | | | | | | | |
| CBOS | 4–10 March | 995 | 38 | | | | 5 | | 3 | 1 | 0 | | 41 (Note: Lech Kaczyński — 20, Szmajdziński — 2, Nałęcz — 1, Dorn — 1, Others — 17) | 12 | 18 |
| CBOS | 4–10 February | 1,021 | 28 | | | | 8 | | 2 | 4 | 0 | | 42 (Note: Lech Kaczyński — 18, Szmajdziński — 3, Nałęcz — 0, Others — 21) | 16 | 10 |
| CBOS | 7–13 January | 1,052 | 2 | | | 1 | 5 | 1 | | | | | 52 (Note: Tusk — 20, Lech Kaczyński — 14, Cimoszewicz — 4, Szmajdziński — 3, Jolanta Kwaśniewska — 2, Aleksander Kwaśniewski — 2, Sikorski — 2, Kalinowski — 1, Others — 4) | 39 | 6 |

=== Second round ===
| Date | Institute | Candidate | | Undecided | Source |
| Date | Institute | Bronisław Komorowski | Jarosław Kaczyński | Undecided | Source |
|---|---|---|---|---|---|
| 7 May 2010 | TNS OBOP | 61% | 39% | – | |
| 10 May 2010 | SMG/KRC | 54% | 41% | 5% | |
| 12 May 2010 | GfK Polonia | 53% | 34% | 13% | |
| 14 May 2010 | TNS OBOP | 55% | 39% | 6% | |
| 17 May 2010 | SMG/KRC Millward Brown | 58% | 33% | 9% | |
| 2 June 2010 | PBS DGA | 64% | 36% | – | |
| 4 June 2010 | SMG/KRC Millward Brown | 56% | 35% | 9% | |
| 9 June 2010 | SMG/KRC Millward Brown | 54% | 36% | 7% | |
| 16 June 2010 | SMG/KRC Millward Brown | 60% | 40% | – | |
| 18 June 2010 | MillwardBrown SMG/KRC | 56% | 33% | 11% | |
| 30 June – 1 July 2010 | TNS OBOP | 45% | 37% | 18% | |
| 1 July 2010 | GfK Polonia | 47% | 49% | 4% | |
| 2 July 2010 | Millward Brown SMG/KRC | 51% | 44% | 5% | |
| 2 July 2010 | Homo Homini | 47.6% | 45.2% | 7.2% | |

== Results ==
Results of the first round

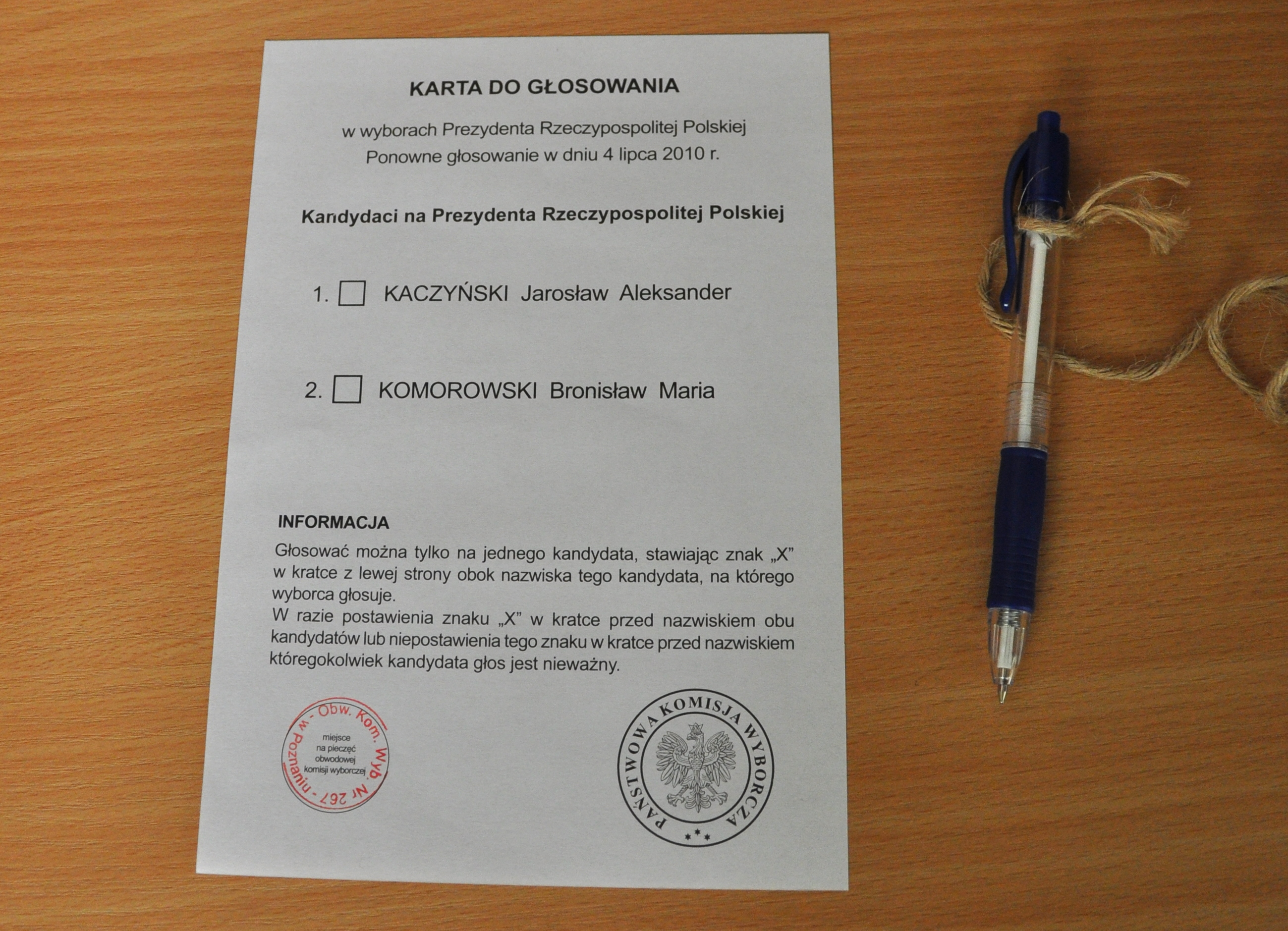
Second round voting card

There were 10 candidates in the first round of voting. Bronisław Komorowski of Civic Platform received 41.5% and Jarosław Kaczyński of Law and Justice received 36.5%, causing a second round of voting between the two. The other eight candidates were eliminated.

Soon after exit polls were released in the second round, Jarosław Kaczyński conceded that he had been defeated. Bronisław Komorowski appeared to tentatively claim victory, stating: "Tonight we will open a small bottle of champagne and tomorrow we will open a big bottle." The exit polls put Komorowski ahead of Kaczyński by 53% to 47%. On the following day, Komorowski was declared the winner of the election. The final result put Komorowski with 53.01% of the vote, and Kaczyński with 46.99%. Komorowski's win resulted in Civic Platform holding both the Presidency and the government (under Prime Minister Donald Tusk). Correspondents in US and British business newspapers suggested that Komorowski's win would mean closer engagement with the European Union, and such domestic economic reforms as deficit reduction.

| Candidate | Party | First round | | Second round | |
| Candidate | Party | Votes | % | Votes | % |
|---|---|---|---|---|---|
| Bronisław Komorowski | Civic Platform | 6,981,319 | 41.54 | 8,933,887 | 53.01 |
| Jarosław Kaczyński | Law and Justice | 6,128,255 | 36.46 | 7,919,134 | 46.99 |
| Grzegorz Napieralski | Democratic Left Alliance | 2,299,870 | 13.68 | | |
| Janusz Korwin-Mikke | Liberty and Lawfulness | 416,898 | 2.48 | | |
| Waldemar Pawlak | Polish People's Party | 294,273 | 1.75 | | |
| Andrzej Olechowski | Independent (SD) | 242,439 | 1.44 | | |
| Andrzej Lepper | Self-Defense of the Republic of Poland | 214,657 | 1.28 | | |
| Marek Jurek | Right Wing of the Republic | 177,315 | 1.06 | | |
| Bogusław Ziętek | Polish Labour Party - August 80 | 29,548 | 0.18 | | |
| Kornel Morawiecki | Independent (SW) | 21,596 | 0.13 | | |
| Total | | 16,806,170 | 100.00 | 16,853,021 | 100.00 |
| Valid votes | | 16,806,170 | 99.30 | 16,853,021 | 98.84 |
| Invalid/blank votes | | 117,662 | 0.70 | 197,396 | 1.16 |
| Total votes | | 16,923,832 | 100.00 | 17,050,417 | 100.00 |
| Registered voters/turnout | | 30,813,005 | 54.92 | 30,833,924 | 55.30 |
Source: PKW, PKW

Vote share
Second round
| Komorowski | 53.01% |
| J. Kaczyński | 46.99% |
First round
| Komorowski | 41.54% |
| J. Kaczyński | 36.46% |
| Napieralski | 13.68% |
| Korwin-Mikke | 2.48% |
| Pawlak | 1.75% |
| Olechowski | 1.44% |
| Lepper | 1.28% |
| Jurek | 1.06% |
| Others | 0.31% |

== Analysis ==
A post-election poll by Centre for Public Opinion Research showed a divergence from the official results, with Jarosław Kaczyński underperfoming in the poll and Bronisław Komorowski overperforming, especially in the second round — in the poll, Kaczyński only received 37.2% in the second round, whereas he received 47% in the election. Given this disparity, in the poll, 5% of Kaczyński's second-round voters had supported Grzegorz Napieralski in the first round, compared with 16% of Komorowski's electorate. 81% of Kaczyński's second-round electorate stated they were voting for Kaczyński rather than against Komorowski, while the equivalent figure among Komorowski's voters was 63%. The poll also indicated that more frequent churchgoers were more likely to vote for Kaczyński in the second round.

== Aftermath ==
The atmosphere of the election heavily discouraged negative campaigning, given the president Lech Kaczyński's death and the fact that his brother, Jarosław Kaczyński, was a presidential candidate. Both Kaczyński and Komorowski utilized what the media dubbed "politics of love". This allowed Jarosław Kaczyński to improve his hitherto very negative reputation — according to March 2010 polls, only 29% of Poles trusted Jarosław Kaczyński, associating him with unethical and corrupt tactics that he resorted to as prime minister between 2006 and 2007 to eliminate Law and Justice's coalition partners, Self-Defence of the Republic of Poland and League of Polish Families, from the political life. In May 2010, 42% of poll correspondents trusted Kaczyński, and by the end of the election, 57% saw him positively, 42% neutrally, and 1% negatively. Using conciliatory rhetoric, Kaczyński was able to present himself as a "Polish Job" and a "father of the nation".

Despite his victory, the election was considered to have gone poorly for Bronisław Komorowski. Initially, his campaign heavily relied on attacking Kaczyński; the libertarian wing of PO represented by Janusz Palikot harshly attacked Kaczyński, and Komorowski's campaign also aired spots meant to ridicule Kaczyński and portray his as insincere and hypocritical. Negative campaigning backfired, and given Kaczyński's marked rise in the polls towards the end of campaign, put Komorowski and his political environment on the defensive. Prime Minister Donald Tusk heavily involved himself in Komorowski's campaign, while Komorowski vigorously attended meetings across Poland and utilized public institutions to gain votes, including having the government send letters to thousands of soldiers assuring them that the existing pension system would be maintained. Political scientist Paweł Jakubowski stated that Komorowski's campaign was marred by "a lack of coordination and an ineffective narrative", and "failed to reflect the changed situation brought about by the mood of mourning and the floods." Jakubowski argued:

[Komorowski's] narrow victory calls into question the effectiveness of the Marshal’s campaign team, which needed a major mobilisation in the face of unfavourable polls. Paradoxically – despite the defeat – Jarosław Kaczyński can claim success, as he achieved the party’s strategic objectives. Firstly, he managed to mobilise the broad coalition that emerged after 10 April. He succeeded in seamlessly taking over the electorate from his late brother, as well as expanding it, thereby rebuilding the patriotic-nationalist bloc following the defeat in 2007. The second point is the setting of the campaign agenda and the effective framing of events. A change in image and rhetoric allowed the vision of the “Fourth Republic” to be pushed into the background, relying instead on sentiment and emotion.

The election was also considered a success for Grzegorz Napieralski and his party, the Democratic Left Alliance. Napieralski was able to overcome the opposition within his own party, as initially Napieralski polled poorly (below 6%) and the party's key members considered removing Napieralski from party leadership. Ultimately, Napieralski won almost 14% of the popular vote, which was seen as "a personal success and a surprise to many political observers". He consolidated and expanded the Democratic Left Alliance's electorate, gained a mandate to continue leading the party, which maintained its position as the third political force.

However, the consequences of the election proved to be short-lived. In the 2011 Polish parliamentary election, the Democratic Left Alliance lost half its seats, which was considered an unmitigated disaster and led to Napieralski quickly resigning as the party leader. Meanwhile, Kaczyński's better-than-expected election result did not strengthen Law and Justice, as the party quickly regressed after the campaign ended and underperformed in 2011, achieving a slightly worse result compared to its 2007 performance.
