= Wacław Martyniuk =

Polish politician

Member of Sejm 2005-2007
- In office 25 November 1991 – 7 November 2011

Personal details
- Born: 10 November 1949 (age 76)
- Party: Democratic Left Alliance

Wacław Andrzej Martyniuk (pronounced [ˈvat͡swaf marˈtɨɲuk]; born 10 November 1949 in Bytom) is a Polish politician. He was elected to Sejm on 25 September 2005, receiving 11,339 votes in the 29th Gliwice district, running on the Democratic Left Alliance (SLD) list.

He was also a member of Sejm 1991-1993, Sejm 1993-1997, Sejm 1997-2001, and Sejm 2001-2005.

== See also ==
- Members of Polish Sejm 2005-2007
