= Artur Ostrowski =

Polish politician (born 1968)

member of Sejm 2005-2007
- In office 18 October 2005 – 11 November 2015

Personal details
- Born: 29 August 1968 (age 57)
- Party: Democratic Left Alliance

Artur Ostrowski (born 29 August 1968 in Piotrków Trybunalski) is a Polish politician. He was elected to the Sejm on 25 September 2005, getting 7,043 votes in 10 Piotrków Trybunalski district as a candidate from Democratic Left Alliance list.

== See also ==
- Members of Polish Sejm 2005-2007
