= Wojciech Olejniczak =

Polish politician (born 1974)

Wojciech Michał Olejniczak
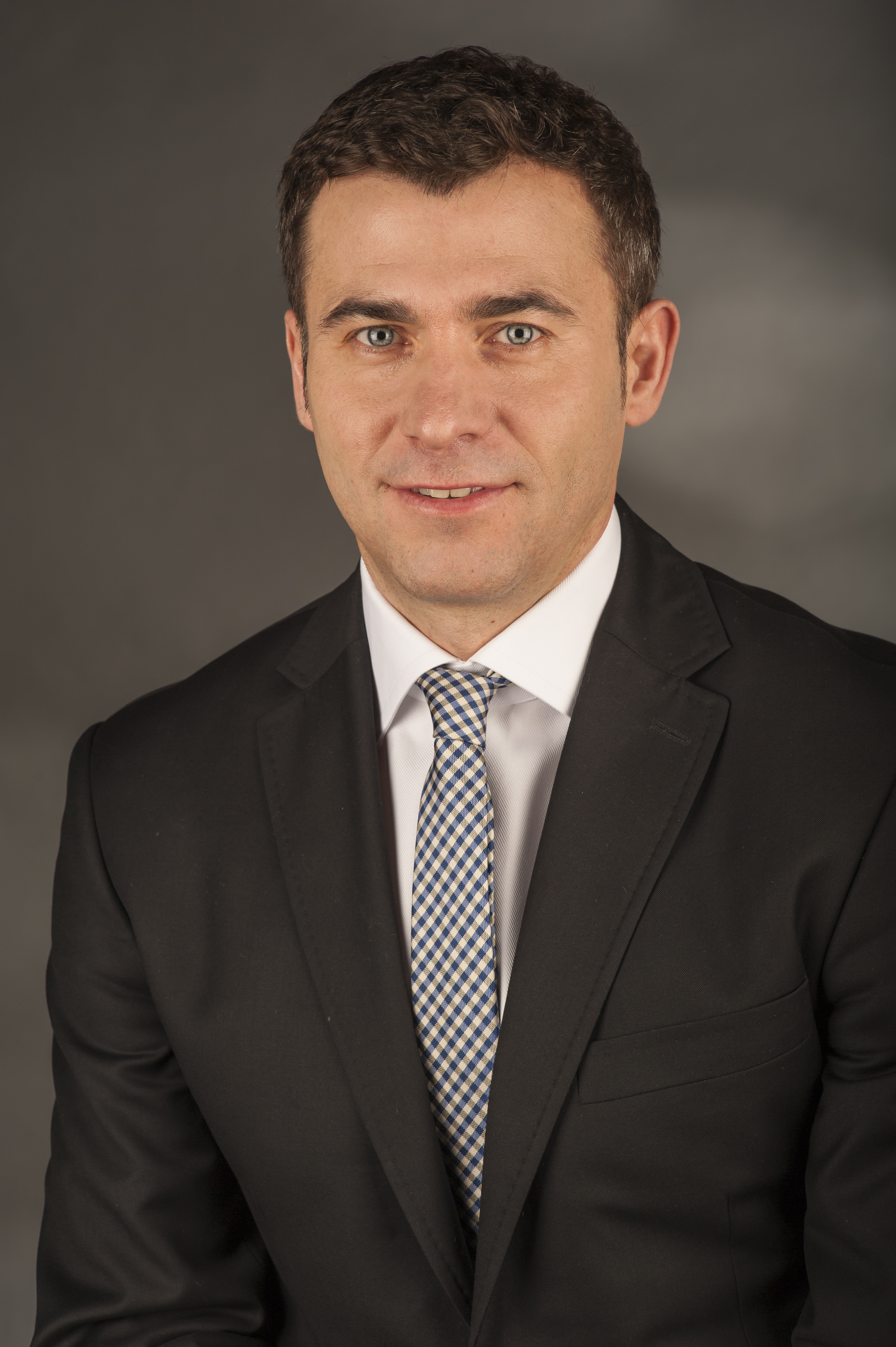

Member of the European Parliament
- In office 14 July 2009 – 1 July 2014
- Constituency: Warsaw

Member of the Sejm
- In office 19 October 2001 – 10 June 2009
- Constituency: Łódź

Minister of Agriculture and Rural Development
- In office 2 July 2003 – 31 May 2005
- Prime Minister: Leszek Miller
- Preceded by: Adam Tański
- Succeeded by: Jerzy Pilarczyk

Leader of Democratic Left Alliance
- In office 29 May 2005 – 31 May 2008
- Preceded by: Józef Oleksy
- Succeeded by: Grzegorz Napieralski

Personal details
- Born: 10 April 1974 (age 52) Łowicz, Poland
- Party: Democratic Left Alliance
- Spouse: Anna Olejniczak
- Profession: Economist

Wojciech Michał Olejniczak (pronounced [ˈvɔjt͡ɕɛx ɔlɛjˈɲit͡ʂak]; born 10 April 1974) is a Polish former leftist politician, member of the European Parliament, and banker.

He hold degrees in both engineering and economics (PhD). He was the chairman of the Democratic Left Alliance (SLD) from 29 May 2005, to 31 May 2008 (the first chairman of that party that was not a member of Polish United Workers' Party) and the vice-speaker of Sejm since 26 October 2005. From 2 July 2003, to 31 May 2005, Olejniczak was the Minister of Agriculture and Rural Development.

He was elected to the Sejm on 25 September 2005 getting 31,471 votes in the 11th Sieradz district, running on the SLD list. He was also a member of Sejm 2001–2005. He was reelected on 21 October 2007 getting 51,865 votes in the 9th Łódź district.

On 7 June 2009 he was elected as a Member of the European Parliament for the Warsaw constituency, gaining 72,854 votes.

Since 2024, he is a suspect in two cases of economic misdemeanor, with one concerning his activity in Agro Alior Bank, another in PZU. He has no allegiance to the current party New Left.

== See also ==
- Members of Polish Sejm 2005–2007
- Members of Polish Sejm 2007–2011
