= Józef Oleksy =

46th Prime Minister of Poland from 1995 to 1996

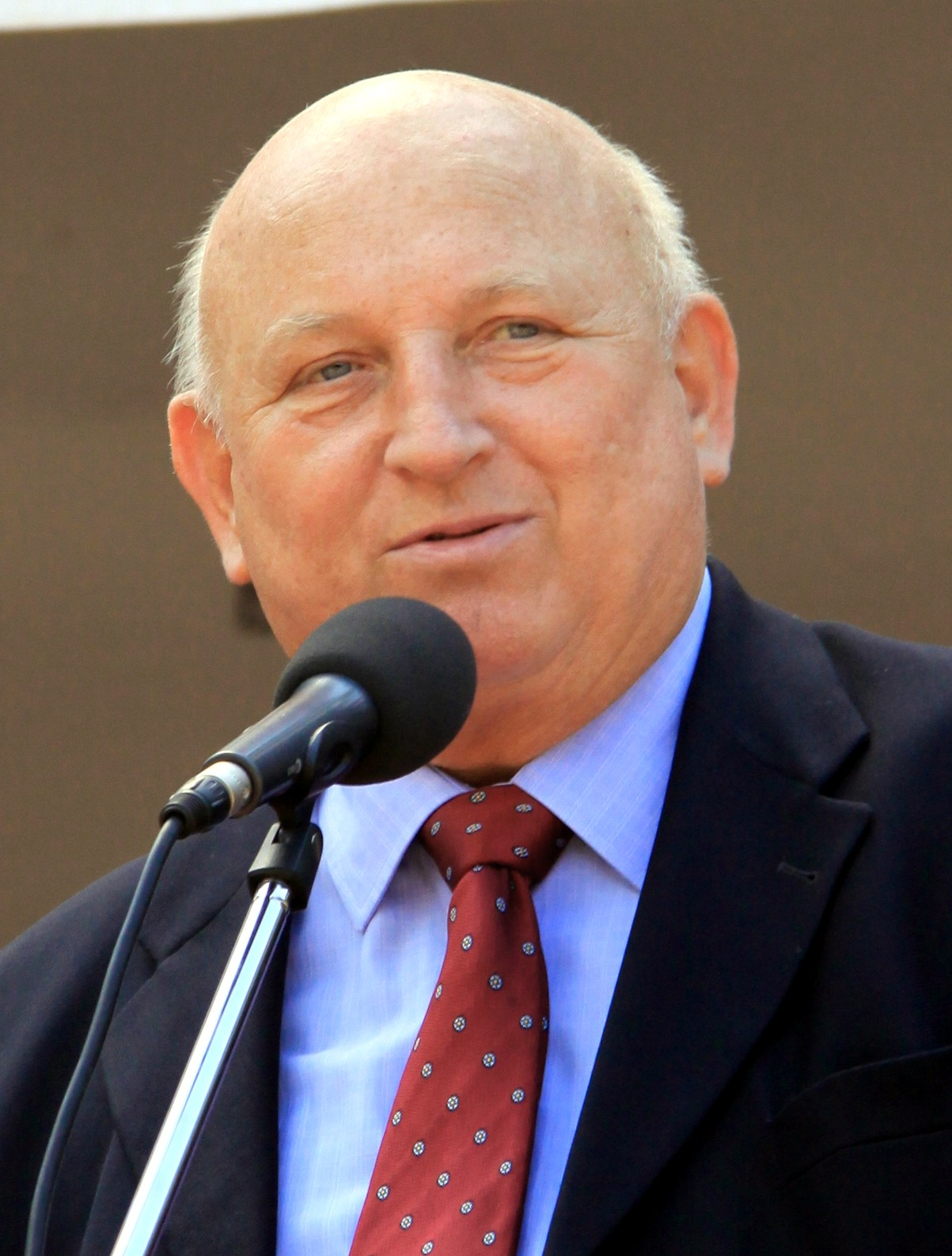
- Oleksy in 2009

Prime Minister of Poland
- In office 7 March 1995 – 7 February 1996
- President: Lech Wałęsa; Aleksander Kwaśniewski
- Deputy: Roman Jagieliński; Grzegorz Kołodko; Aleksander Łuczak
- Preceded by: Waldemar Pawlak
- Succeeded by: Włodzimierz Cimoszewicz

Leader of Democratic Left Alliance
- In office 18 December 2004 – 21 May 2005
- Preceded by: Krzysztof Janik
- Succeeded by: Wojciech Olejniczak

Marshal of the Sejm
- In office 21 April 2004 – 5 January 2005
- Preceded by: Marek Borowski
- Succeeded by: Włodzimierz Cimoszewicz
- In office 14 October 1993 – 3 March 1995
- Preceded by: Wiesław Chrzanowski
- Succeeded by: Józef Zych

Deputy Prime Minister of Poland
- In office 21 January 2004 – 21 April 2004
- Prime Minister: Leszek Miller
- Preceded by: Grzegorz Kołodko
- Succeeded by: Izabela Jaruga-Nowacka

Minister of Interior and Administration
- In office 21 January 2004 – 21 April 2004
- Prime Minister: Leszek Miller
- Preceded by: Krzysztof Janik
- Succeeded by: Ryszard Kalisz

Leader of Social Democracy
- In office 23 December 1995 – 21 September 1997
- Preceded by: Aleksander Kwaśniewski
- Succeeded by: Leszek Miller

Member of the Sejm, X, I, II, III and IV
- In office 4 June 1989 – 18 October 2005

Personal details
- Born: 22 June 1946 Nowy Sącz, Poland
- Died: 9 January 2015 (aged 68) Warsaw, Poland
- Party: Social Democracy of the Republic of Poland, Democratic Left Alliance
- Spouse: Maria Oleksy
- Profession: Economist
- Awards: Order of Polonia Restituta Cross of Merit (Poland) Medal of the 40th Anniversary of People's Poland Medal of Merit for National Defence KEN (Poland) Order for Merits to Lithuania Order of Merit of the Federal Republic of Germany

Józef Oleksy (pronounced [ˈjuzɛf ɔˈlɛksɨ]; 22 June 1946 – 9 January 2015) was a Polish left-wing politician who served as Prime Minister of Poland from 7 March 1995 to 7 February 1996, when he resigned due to espionage allegations. He was chairman of the Democratic Left Alliance (Sojusz Lewicy Demokratycznej, SLD).

== Early life and education ==
In his youth he lived in Nowy Sącz, and was an altar boy at St. Margaret church. He graduated from Kazimierz Brodziński High School in Tarnów. Later on, he graduated from the Faculty of Foreign Trade of the Warsaw School of Planning and Statistics (currently SGH Warsaw School of Economics). He obtained a doctoral degree in economics. He was a dean and lecturer at the Faculty of International Relations at the SGH Warsaw School of Economics and the Vistula University in Warsaw.

== Career ==
From 1968 to 1990 he was a member of the communist Polish United Workers' Party (PZPR). He was a member of the board of the main Socialist Union of Polish Students. He chaired the National Council of Young Scientists. He was the secretary of the PZPR University Committee at the Warsaw School of Planning and Statistics. In 1977 he went to work in party apparatus at the Department of Ideological and Educational Work of the Central Committee of the Polish United Workers' Party. From 1981 to the X Congress of the Party, he headed the office of the Central Committee of the Party. In 1987-1989 he was the First Secretary of the Provincial Party Committee in Biala Podlaska. In 1989, he served as Minister-Council member for cooperation with trade unions. In the same year he took part in the round table talks on the government side. Oleksy represented the Communist leadership in round table talks with the opposition Solidarity movement in early 1989.

In 1990 he was one of the founders of the Social Democracy of the Republic of Poland, he was the chairman of this party from 28 January 1996 to 6 December 1997, and co-founded the Democratic Left Alliance in 1999. In the years 1989–2005, he was the member of the Sejm.

In the years 1993-1995 he was the Marshal of the Sejm. From 7 March 1995 to 7 February 1996, he served as Prime Minister of Poland. He resigned after being accused by Interior Minister Andrzej Milczanowski for spying for Russia under the pseudonym "Olin". These allegations have never been confirmed.

In the years 2001-2005 he was a chairman of the European Union Committee in the Sejm which was responsible for aligning all Polish laws and regulations before Poland joined European Union in 2004. In 2004 he was a member of the European Parliament and the Convention on the Future of Europe, which was responsible to produce a draft constitution for the European Union for the European Council to finalise and adopt.

In early 2004 he took the office of the Minister of Internal Affairs. Between 21 April 2004 and 5 January 2005 he was the Marshal of the Sejm.

A record of a private conversation Józef Oleksy had with one of Poland's richest businessmen Aleksander Gudzowaty leaked to the media on 22 March 2007. The tapes suggested corruption in the SLD party. Oleksy accused former president Aleksander Kwaśniewski of illegal financial procedures, and spoke very harshly of then SLD leader Wojciech Olejniczak and several other members of the party. He soon left the SLD. He re-joined the SLD on 1 February 2010 and on 12 May 2012 he became vice-president of this party.

== Private life ==
Józef Oleksy was married to Maria Oleksy. He had two children.

Since 2005 he had been struggling with cancer. He died on 9 January 2015. Funeral ceremonies with representatives of the state authorities, including President Bronisław Komorowski, Prime Minister Ewa Kopacz and Marshal of the Sejm Radosław Sikorski, took place on 16 January 2015 in the Field Cathedral of the Polish Army in Warsaw. Józef Oleksy was buried at the Powązki Military Cemetery.

== Honours and awards ==
- Poland :
  - Grand Cross of the Order of Polonia Restituta (2015, posthumously)
  - Officer's Cross of the Order of Polonia Restituta
  - Knight's Cross of the Order of Polonia Restituta (1984)
  - Silver Cross of Merit (1972)
  - Medal of Merit for National Defence
- Germany : Grand Cross 1st Class Order of Merit of the Federal Republic of Germany
- Lithuania :Grand Commander Cross of the Order for Merits to Lithuania (2004)

== See also ==
- Politics of Poland
- List of political parties in Poland
- List of politicians in Poland

Political offices
Preceded by Wiesław Chrzanowski	Marshal of the Sejm; 1993–1995	Succeeded by Józef Zych
Preceded by Waldemar Pawlak	Prime Minister of Poland; 1995–1996	Succeeded by Włodzimierz Cimoszewicz
Preceded by Marek Borowski	Marshal of the Sejm; 2004–2005	Succeeded by Włodzimierz Cimoszewicz
Party political offices
Preceded by Aleksander Kwaśniewski	Leader of the Social Democracy; 1995–1997	Succeeded by Leszek Miller
Preceded by Krzysztof Janik	Leader of the Democratic Left Alliance; 2004–2005	Succeeded by Wojciech Olejniczak
