= Democratic Left Alliance (Poland) =

Polish centre-left political party

Democratic Left Alliance Sojusz Lewicy Demokratycznej
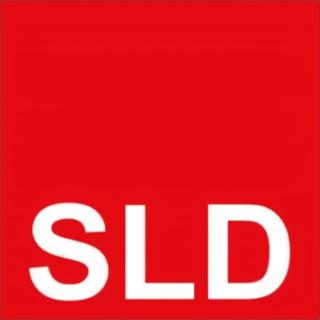
- Leader: Włodzimierz Czarzasty
- Founder: Aleksander Kwaśniewski
- Founded: 9 July 1991; 35 years ago (as a coalition); 15 April 1999; 27 years ago (as a party)
- Dissolved: 9 October 2021; 5 years ago
- Merger of: SdRP, minor parties (1991)
- Merged into: New Left
- Headquarters: ul. Złota 9 Warsaw
- Youth wing: Social Democratic Youth Federation
- Membership (2018): 33,554
- Ideology: Social democracy Pro-Europeanism; Atlanticism
- Political position: Centre-left
- National affiliation: The Left
- European affiliation: Party of European Socialists
- European Parliament group: Progressive Alliance of Socialists and Democrats
- International affiliation: Progressive Alliance
- Colours: Red

Website
- lewica.org.pl
- Politics of Poland; Political parties; Elections; A: Previously SLD-UP (2001–14), Left and Democrats (2006–08), United Left (2015) and the European Coalition (2019). B: It was also described as economically right-wing.

The Democratic Left Alliance (Polish: Sojusz Lewicy Demokratycznej) was a social-democratic political party in Poland. It was formed on 9 July 1991 as an electoral alliance of centre-left parties, and became a single party on 15 April 1999. It was the major coalition party in Poland between 1993 and 1997, and between 2001 and 2005, with four Prime ministers coming from the party: Józef Oleksy, Włodzimierz Cimoszewicz, Leszek Miller and Marek Belka. It then faded into opposition, overshadowed by the rise of Civic Platform and Law and Justice.

In February 2020, the party initiated a process to merge with the Spring party, choosing the name New Left (Polish: Nowa Lewica), and changing to a more modern logo.

The party was a member of the Party of European Socialists and Progressive Alliance.

== History ==
=== Ideology and support patterns ===
The party can be classified as centre-left. However, during the 1990s, it managed to attract voters from the pro-market and even right-wing camp. The main support for SLD came from middle-rank state sector employees, retired people, former communist Polish United Workers' Party (PZPR) and All-Poland Alliance of Trade Unions (OPZZ) members and those who were unlikely to be frequent church-goers. The core of the coalition (Social Democracy of the Republic of Poland) rejected concepts such as lustration and de-communization, supported a parliamentarian regime with only the role of an arbiter for the president and criticized the right-wing camp for the introduction of religious education into school. The ex-communists criticized the economic reforms, pointing to the high social costs, without negating the reforms per se.

=== Coalition ===
SdRP, SDU and some other socialist and social-democratic parties had formed the original Democratic Left Alliance as a centre-left coalition just prior to the nation's first free elections in 1991. In 1999 the coalition became a party but lost some members.

At the time, the coalition's membership drew mostly from the former PZPR. An alliance between the SLD and the Polish People's Party (PSL) ruled Poland in the years 1993–1997. However, the coalition lost power to the right-wing Solidarity Electoral Action in the 1997 election as the right-wing opposition was united this time and because of the decline of support for SLD's coalition partner PSL, though the SLD itself actually gained votes.

=== Electoral victory ===
SLD formed a coalition with Labour Union before the 2001 Polish election and won it overwhelmingly at last by capturing about 5.3 million votes, 42% of the whole and won 200 of 460 seats in the Sejm and 75 of 100 in the Senate. After the elections, the coalition was joined by the Polish People's Party (PSL) in forming a government and Leszek Miller became the Prime Minister. In March 2003, the PSL left the coalition.

=== Rywin affair ===
By 2004, the support for SLD in the polls had dropped from about 30% to just below 10%, and several high-ranking party members had been accused of taking part in high-profile political scandals by the mainstream press, including the Rywin affair, in which film producer Lew Rywin, claiming to be acting on behalf of the government, sought a bribe from the editor of the Gazeta Wyborcza newspaper in return for favourable amendments to a proposed new law on media ownership. Prime Minister Leszek Miller was obliged under Polish law to report the attempted bribery to the police when it was brought to his attention, but did not do so.

On 6 March 2004, Miller resigned as party leader and was replaced by Krzysztof Janik. On 26 March, the Sejm speaker Marek Borowski, together with other high-ranking SLD officials, announced the creation of a new centre-left party, the Social Democratic Party of Poland. On the next day, Leszek Miller announced he would step down as Prime Minister on 2 May 2004, the day after Poland joined the European Union. Miller proceeded to do so.

=== Decline after Rywin-gate ===
In the 2004 European Parliament election, it only received 9% of the votes, giving it 5 of 54 seats reserved for Poland in the European Parliament, as part of the Party of European Socialists.

Wojciech Olejniczak, the former Minister of Agriculture and Rural Development, was elected the president of SLD on 29 May 2004, succeeded Józef Oleksy, who resigned from the post of Polish Prime Minister due to false accusations of links to the KGB.

=== Opposition and decline: 2005 and after ===
The 2004 European elections foreshadowed the SLD's huge defeat in the 2005 parliamentary election, in which it won only 11.3% of the vote. This gave the party 55 seats, barely a quarter of what it had had prior to the election. It also lost all of its senators. In late 2006, a centre-left political alliance called Left and Democrats was created, comprising SLD and smaller centre-left parties, the Labour Union, the Social Democratic Party of Poland, and the liberal Democratic Party – demokraci.pl. The coalition won a disappointing 13% in the 2007 parliamentary election and was dissolved soon after in April 2008. On 31 May 2008, Olejniczak was replaced by Grzegorz Napieralski as an SLD leader.

In the 2009 European election, the Democratic Left Alliance-Labor Union joint ticket received 12% of the vote and seven MEPs were elected as part of the newly retitled Socialists & Democrats group.

In the 2011 parliamentary election, SLD received 8.24% of the vote which gave it 27 seats in the Sejm. After the elections, one of the party members, Sławomir Kopyciński, decided to leave SLD and join Palikot's Movement. On 10 December 2011, Leszek Miller was chosen to return as the party leader.

In the 2014 European elections, on 25 May 2014, the SLD received 9.4% of the national vote and returned four MEPs.

In July 2015, the SLD formed the United Left electoral alliance along with Your Movement (TR), Labour United (UP) and The Greens (PZ) and minor parties to contest the upcoming election.

In the 2015 parliamentary election held on 25 October 2015, the United Left list received 7.6% of the vote, below the 8% threshold (electoral alliances must win at least 8% of the vote, as opposed to the 5% for individual parties), leaving the SLD without parliamentary representation for the first time. Indeed, for the first time since the end of Communism, no centre-left parties won any seats in this election.

In 2017, the party withdrew from the Socialist International, while maintaining ties with the Progressive Alliance.

For the 2019 parliamentary election, SLD formed an alliance with Razem and Wiosna, known as The Left. In the 2019 parliamentary election, the alliance won 12.6% of the vote and 49 seats in the Sejm, with the SLD winning 24. Later, it was announced that the Democratic Left Alliance would form with the Spring new political party called the New Left. The creation was delayed due to the COVID-19 pandemic.

== Voter base ==
The SLD is usually seen as the face of the standard Polish left, having achieved notable electoral success during the 90s and benefitting from a strongly organized network of local offices, which span 320 of Poland's 380 administrative counties. For this reason, it was often viewed as the go-to party for left-leaning Poles for the majority of Poland's modern history. The party's monopoly on mainstream left-wing economic ideas in Poland however ended, after the right-wing Law and Justice party adopted many economically interventionist positions, which led a considerable portion of economically left-wing Poles to vote for Law and Justice instead. Political scientist Marcin Ślarzyński wrote that despite being the main left-leaning force in Poland between the 1990s and 2010s, SLD "did not have an economically left-wing, redistributive agenda".

Besides self-described left-wingers, the party enjoys the support of many members of the country's police and military, but its largest voting bloc resides among former PZPR members, government officials and civil servants during the PPR period, which are seen as the party's core supporters. The loyal support of this voting bloc enabled the SLD to remain the largest party of the Polish left, even throughout the scandals that rocked the party in the early 2000s.

However, this electoral bloc was seen as unreliable by political observers, as despite the fact that it originally constituted a huge voting bloc, that segment of the population would inevitably shrink as its members steadily age. Following the passage of a "degradation law" by the ruling right-wing PiS party, which cut pensions and disability benefits to thousands of former bureaucrats, however, the party has undergone a revival, as more and more people's primary income came to be threatened by the new government policy. This led many of those affected to support the SLD, thus enlarging and mobilizing the formerly shrinking voting bloc.

The SLD nonetheless made a significant effort to broaden its political appeal by joining forces with two smaller left-wing parties in 2019, creating The Left political alliance, which poses itself as a 'modern' take on leftism.

== Election results ==
=== Sejm ===
Election year	Leader	# of votes	% of vote	# of overall seats won	+/–	Government
1991	Aleksander Kwaśniewski	1,344,820	11.99 (#2)	60 / 460	▼113	PC–ZChN–PSL-PL–SLCh (1991–1992)
1991	Aleksander Kwaśniewski	1,344,820	11.99 (#2)	60 / 460	▼113	UD–ZChN–PChD–KLD–PSL-PL–SLCh–PPPP (1992–1993)
1993	Aleksander Kwaśniewski	2,815,169	20.41 (#1)	171 / 460	▲111	SLD–PSL
1997	Włodzimierz Cimoszewicz	3,551,224	27.13 (#2)	164 / 460	▼6	AWS–UW (1997–2000)
1997	Włodzimierz Cimoszewicz	3,551,224	27.13 (#2)	164 / 460	▼6	AWS Minority (2000–2001)
2001	Leszek Miller	5,342,519	41.04 (#1)	200 / 460	▲32	SLD–UP–PSL (2001–2003)
2001	Leszek Miller	5,342,519	41.04 (#1)	200 / 460	▲32	SLD–UP (2003–2004)
2001	Leszek Miller	5,342,519	41.04 (#1)	200 / 460	▲32	SLD–UP–SDPL (2004–2005)
2001	As part of the SLD-UP coalition, which won 216 seats in total.					
2005	Wojciech Olejniczak	1,335,257	11.31 (#4)	55 / 460	▼145	PiS Minority (2005)
2005	Wojciech Olejniczak	1,335,257	11.31 (#4)	55 / 460	▼145	PiS–SRP–LPR (2006–2007)
2005	Wojciech Olejniczak	1,335,257	11.31 (#4)	55 / 460	▼145	PiS Minority (2007)
2007	Wojciech Olejniczak	2,122,981	13.15 (#3)	40 / 460	▼15	PO–PSL
2007	As part of the Left and Democrats coalition, which won 53 seats in total.					
2011	Grzegorz Napieralski	1,184,303	8.24 (#5)	27 / 460	▼13	PO–PSL
2015	Leszek Miller	1,147,102	7.55 (#5)	0 / 460	▼27	Extra-parliamentary
2015	As part of the United Left coalition, which did not win any seats.					
2019	Włodzimierz Czarzasty	2,319,946	12.56 (#3)	49 / 460	▲49	PiS

=== Senate ===
Election year	# of votes	% of vote	# of overall seats won	Seat change	Majority
1991	2,431,178	21.2	4 / 100	▲4	
1993	4,993,061	35.7	37 / 100	▲33	SLD–PSL
1997	6,091,721	45.7	28 / 100	▼9	AWS
2001	10,476,677	38.7	70 / 100	▲42	SLD-UP
2001	As part of the SLD-UP coalition, which won 75 seats in total.				
2005	3,114,118	12.9	0 / 100	▼70	PiS–SRP–LPR
2007	4,751,281	14.6	2 / 100	Steady	PO
2007	As part of the Left and Democrats coalition, which won 1 seat.				
2011	1,307,547	9.0	2 / 100	Steady	PO-PSL
2015	595,206	4.0	0 / 100	Steady	PiS
2015	As part of the United Left coalition, which did not win any seats.				
2019	415,745	2.3	2 / 100	Steady	KO-PSL-SLD

=== Presidential ===
Election year	Candidate	1st round		2nd round	
Election year	Candidate	# of overall votes	% of overall vote	# of overall votes	% of overall vote
1990	Supported Włodzimierz Cimoszewicz	1,514,025	9.2 (#4)		
1995	Aleksander Kwaśniewski	6,275,670	35.1 (#1)	9,704,439	51.7 (#1)
2000	Supported Aleksander Kwaśniewski	9,485,224	53.9 (#1)		
2005	Supported Marek Borowski	1,544,642	10.3% (#4)		
2010	Grzegorz Napieralski	2,299,870	13.7 (#3)		
2015	Supported Magdalena Ogórek	353,883	2.4 (#5)		
2020	Supported Robert Biedroń	432,129	2.2 (#6)		

=== European Parliament ===
Election year	# of votes	% of vote	# of overall seats won	+/–
2004	569,311	9.4 (#5)	5 / 54	▲5
2009	908,765	12.3 (#3)	7 / 50	▲2
2014	667,319	9.4 (#3)	5 / 51	▼2
2019	812,584	5.95 (38,47) (#2)	5 / 51	Steady
As part of the European Coalition, which won 22 seats in total.

=== Regional assemblies ===
Election year	% of vote	# of overall seats won	+/–
1998	31.8 (#2)	329 / 855	
2002	24.7 (#1)	189 / 561	
2006	14.3 (#3)	66 / 561	▼123
As part of the Left and Democrats coalition.
2010	15.2 (#4)	85 / 561	▲19
2014	8.8 (#4)	28 / 555	▼57
As part of the SLD – The Left Together coalition.
2018	6.7 (#4)	11 / 552	▼17
As part of the SLD – The Left Together coalition.

== Presidents and Prime Ministers ==
=== Presidents of the Republic of Poland from SLD ===
Name	Image	From	To
Aleksander Kwaśniewski		23 December 1995	23 December 2005

=== Prime Ministers of the Republic of Poland from SLD ===
Name	Image	From	To
Józef Oleksy		7 March 1995	7 February 1996
Włodzimierz Cimoszewicz		7 February 1996	31 October 1997
Leszek Miller		19 October 2001	2 May 2004
Marek Belka		2 May 2004	31 October 2005

== See also ==
- List of Democratic Left Alliance politicians
- Democratic Left Alliance-Labor Union
