= First Belka cabinet =

- 11th Cabinet of Poland
- May–June 2004
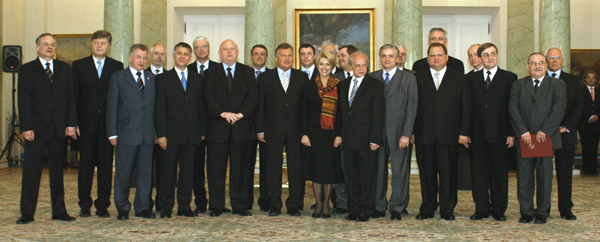
- First Cabinet of Marek Belka (2004)
- Date formed: 2 May 2004
- Date dissolved: 11 June 2004

People and organisations
- President: Aleksander Kwaśniewski
- Prime Minister: Marek Belka
- Deputy Prime Minister: Jerzy Hausner; Izabela Jaruga Nowacka
- Ministers removed: 0 resigned
- Member party: Democratic Left Alliance; Labour Union
- Status in legislature: Minority (coalition)
- Opposition party: Civic Platform; Samoobrona; Law and Justice; League of Polish Families; Polish People's Party; Social Democracy of Poland
- Opposition leader: Donald Tusk

History
- Election: 2001 parliamentary election
- Predecessor: Miller
- Successor: Belka II

The First Cabinet of Marek Belka in Poland was appointed on 2 May 2004. It failed a vote of confidence in parliament on 15 May 2004.

== The Cabinet ==
Office	Image	Name	Party	From	to
Prime Minister		Marek Belka	Democratic Left Alliance	2 May 2004	14 June 2004
Chairman of the Committee for European Integration		Marek Belka	Democratic Left Alliance	2 May 2004	14 June 2004
Deputy Prime Minister		Jerzy Hausner	Democratic Left Alliance	2 May 2004	14 June 2004
Minister of Economy and Labor		Jerzy Hausner	Democratic Left Alliance	2 May 2004	14 June 2004
Deputy Prime Minister		Izabela Jaruga-Nowacka	Labour Union	2 May 2004	14 June 2004
Minister without portfolio		Izabela Jaruga-Nowacka	Labour Union	2 May 2004	14 June 2004
Minister of National Defence		Jerzy Szmajdziński	Democratic Left Alliance	2 May 2004	14 June 2004
Minister of Foreign Affairs		Włodzimierz Cimoszewicz	Democratic Left Alliance	2 May 2004	14 June 2004
Minister without portfolio		Sławomir Cytrycki	Democratic Left Alliance	2 May 2004	14 June 2004
Minister of Agriculture and Rural Development		Wojciech Olejniczak	Democratic Left Alliance	2 May 2004	14 June 2004
Minister of Interior and Administration		Ryszard Kalisz	Democratic Left Alliance	2 May 2004	14 June 2004
Minister of Finance		Andrzej Raczko	Independent	2 May 2004	14 June 2004
Minister of Justice		Marek Sadowski	Independent	2 May 2004	14 June 2004
Minister of State Treasury		Jacek Socha	Independent	2 May 2004	14 June 2004
Minister of Health		Wojciech Rudnicki	Independent	2 May 2004	14 June 2004
Minister of Environment		Jerzy Swatoń	Independent	2 May 2004	14 June 2004
Minister of Culture		Waldemar Dąbrowski	Independent	2 May 2004	14 June 2004
Minister of Infrastructure		Krzysztof Opawski	Independent	2 May 2004	14 June 2004
Minister of National Education and Sport		Mirosław Sawicki	Independent	2 May 2004	14 June 2004
Minister of Social Policy		Krzysztof Pater	Independent	2 May 2004	14 June 2004
Minister of Science and Information		Michał Kleiber	Independent	2 May 2004	14 June 2004
