= Opinion polling on the 2001–2005 Miller–Belka governments =

Polish government opinion polling

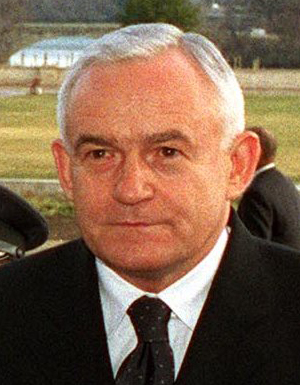
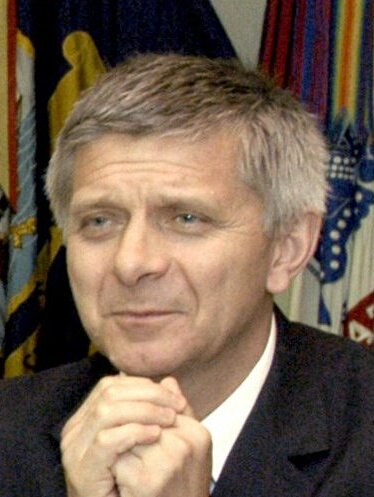
PM Leszek Miller in 2002, PM Marek Belka in 2004.

The Miller, Belka I and Belka II cabinets governed Poland throughout 2001–2005, succeeding the Buzek cabinet. The cabinets were formed by the Democratic Left Alliance – Labour Union—Polish People's Party coalition, which was first elected in the 2001 Polish parliamentary election and lost power in the 2005 election. Throughout their period in power, several polling agencies conducted opinion polls researching support for related issues.

== Prime Ministerial approval polls ==
=== Prime Minister Leszek Miller ===
Graphical summary of approval polls

Date(s) conducted	Polling firm/Link	Sample size	Approve	Disapprove	Don't know	Net approval
2–5 Apr 2004	CBOS	993	9	78	13	–69
5–8 Mar 2004	CBOS	1,022	10	75	14	–65
Apr 2004	OBOP		7	87	6	–80
4–7 Mar 2004	OBOP	1,005	11	82	7	–71
6–9 Feb 2004	CBOS	1,024	14	68	18	–54
5–8 Feb 2004	OBOP	1,005	11	82	7	–71
10–12 Jan 2004	OBOP	1,005	18	74	8	–56
9–12 Jan 2004	CBOS	1,057	17	65	18	–48
6–8 Dec 2003	OBOP	1,005	16	76	8	–60
5–8 Dec 2003	CBOS	1,000	16	67	17	–51
8–10 Nov 2003	OBOP	1,005	14	78	8	–64
7–10 Nov 2003	CBOS	1,088	15	70	15	–55
4–6 Oct 2003	OBOP	1,005	14	78	8	–64
3–6 Oct 2003	CBOS	1,016	20	63	17	–43
6–8 Sep 2003	OBOP	1,005	16	75	9	–59
5–8 Sep 2003	CBOS	1,105	16	66	18	–50
9–11 Aug 2003	OBOP	1,000	14	74	12	–60
1–4 Aug 2003	CBOS	880	19	62	19	–43
5–7 Jul 2003	OBOP	1,005	18	71	11	–53
4–7 Jul 2003	CBOS	952	15	68	17	–53
7–9 Jun 2003	OBOP	1,004	15	74	11	–59
29 May – 1 Jun 2003	CBOS	1,260	19	63	28	–44
10–12 May 2003	OBOP	1,007	16	72	12	–56
9–12 May 2003	CBOS	1,264	17	59	24	–42
5–7 Apr 2003	OBOP	1,004	16	72	12	–56
4–7 Apr 2003	CBOS	1,229	16	65	19	–49
8–10 Mar 2003	OBOP	1,005	26	62	12	–36
1–4 Mar 2003	CBOS	975	31	50	19	–19
8–10 Feb 2003	OBOP	1,001	29	56	15	–27
1–4 Feb 2003	CBOS	1,006	33	44	23	–11
11–13 Jan 2003	OBOP	1,007	41	45	14	–4
3–6 Jan 2003	CBOS	1,025	35	41	24	–6
29 Nov – 2 Dec 2002	CBOS	986	29	47	24	–18
Dec 2003	OBOP		30	56	14	–26
12–14 Nov 2002	OBOP	1,006	30	53	17	–23
8–11 Nov 2002	CBOS	1,042	39	38	23	1
11–14 Oct 2002	CBOS	1,231	38	38	24	Tie
5–7 Oct 2002	OBOP	1,008	35	51	14	–16
6–9 Sep 2002	CBOS	1,235	34	41	25	–7
Sep 2002	OBOP		37	47	16	–10
24–26 Aug 2002	OBOP	1,003	35	50	15	–15
3–5 Aug 2002	OBOP	1,017	31	50	19	–19
2–5 Aug 2002	CBOS	967	34	39	27	–5
5–8 Jul 2002	CBOS	1,024	33	44	23	–11
Jul 2002	OBOP		34	52	14	–18
8–10 Jun 2002	OBOP	1,010	36	49	15	–13
7–10 Jun 2002	CBOS	1,060	35	40	25	–5
11–13 May 2002	OBOP	1,019	38	45	17	–7
10–13 May 2002	CBOS	1,047	40	36	24	4
5–8 Apr 2002	CBOS	1,044	39	35	26	4
Apr 2002	OBOP		39	41	20	–2
9–11 Mar 2002	OBOP	1,017	39	40	21	–1
1–4 Mar 2002	CBOS	1,065	39	36	25	3
9–11 Feb 2002	OBOP	1,005	43	34	23	9
1–4 Feb 2002	CBOS	954	47	30	23	17
10–14 Jan 2002	CBOS	973	46	28	26	18
Jan 2001	OBOP		46	29	25	17
7–10 Dec 2001	CBOS	960	47	25	28	22
Dec 2001	OBOP		47	20	33	27
9–12 Nov 2001	CBOS	968	53	22	25	31
Nov 2001	OBOP		47	9	44	38

=== Will Miller be a good prime minister? ===
Date(s) conducted	Polling firm/Link	Sample size	Good	Decent	Bad	Don't know/Neutral	Net approval
12–15 Oct 2001	CBOS	1,020	45	26	7	22	38

== See also ==
- 2001 Polish parliamentary election
- 2005 Polish parliamentary election
