= LPR =

LPR may refer to:

- Laryngopharyngeal reflux, a form of acid reflux
- Lawful permanent resident
- Lazarus Program file
- Libertarian Party of Russia
- License plate recognition, a technology that uses optical character recognition on images to read vehicle registration plates to create vehicle location data
- Liga Puerto Rico, top division association football league in Puerto Rico
- Line Printer Remote/Daemon protocol (RFC1179)
- League of Polish Families (Liga Polskich Rodzin), a Polish political party
- Liga Prawicy Rzeczypospolitej (League of the Right of the Republic), a Polish political alliance
- Light pollution reduction
- Living Planet Report, a WWF analysis on the health of our planet
- (Le) Poisson Rouge, a music venue in New York City
- Lotnicze Pogotowie Ratunkowe (Polish Medical Air Rescue), Polish air ambulance service
- Low-power radio
- Long Preston railway station, station code LPR
- LPR (cycling team), a former professional cycling team
- Luhansk People's Republic, a self-proclaimed statelet in eastern Ukraine
- A US Navy hull classification symbol: Amphibious transport, small (LPR)
