= League and Self-Defense =

League and Self-Defense Liga i Samoobrona (Polish)
- Fox plush toy presented by Lepper and Giertych as the logo of LiS in July 2007
- Abbreviation: LiS (Fox)
- President: Andrzej Lepper
- Chairperson: Roman Giertych
- Presidium: List: Radosław Parda Mirosław Orzechowski Wojciech Wierzejski Genowefa Wiśniowska Krzysztof Sikora
- Founded: 16 July 2007
- Registered: 17 July 2007
- Dissolved: 7 September 2007
- Succeeded by: League of the Right of the Republic (LPR)
- Headquarters: ul. Kinowa 19 U1, 04-030 Warsaw
- Membership (2007): ~100,000 (Samoobrona); ~14,000 (League of Polish Families)
- Ideology: National agrarianism Catholic nationalism Nationalist socialism (Note: Both Samoobrona and LPR were described to represent 'national socialism' programmatically. This ideology was also attributed to LiS itself.); Left-wing populism Anti-capitalism; Catholic left
- Political position: Left-wing (Note: League and Self-Defense was a combination of a far-left and a far-right party, but the dominance of left-wing elements, especially on economic issues, was noted. The coalition was also considered "not very right-wing". The dissolution of LiS was also considered a "shift to the right". The far-left Samoobrona dominated LiS, as it had more recognition, MPs, popularity and was 7 times larger than LPR. Polish media noted that within LiS, the far-right LPR was dependent on Samoobrona. To accentuate it, some referred to LiS as Lepper i Spółka ("Lepper and others"). International media also observed that Samoobrona held a hegemonic position in LiS. Polish commentator Krzysztof Wołodźko described the party as Catholic left, stating that it followed the tradition of "social[ist] left" as its main message, mixing it with religion and moral conservatism.); League of Polish Families: Far-right (Note: The LPR is also considered economically left-wing. Polish political scientist Katarzyna Czarniecka also argued that national populism better reflects the nature of the party than a 'far-right' or 'extreme-right' classification.); Samoobrona: Far-left
- Religion: Roman Catholic
- Colours: Orange (customary); Yellow (Samoobrona); Blue (League of Polish Families)
- Slogan: Strong as a lion, cunning as a fox (Polish: Mocny jak lew, chytry jak lis)

Logos of LPR and Samoobrona combined together, used by the news channel TVN24 to depict LiS

League and Self-Defense (Polish: Liga i Samoobrona, LiS — lis also means fox in Polish) was a short-lived Polish political alliance between the left-wing populist Self-Defense of the Republic of Poland (Samoobrona) and the national conservative Christian right League of Polish Families (LPR) in July 2007. The alliance was directed against right-wing populist Law and Justice (PiS) that first formed a coalition with both parties, but then gradually marginalized them and shuffled away their ministers. The coalition was marked by mutual distrust as the parties had radically different outlooks, tied together by Euroscepticism, opposition to capitalism and aversion to PiS. The coalition was only polling 6% (below the 8% threshold for coalitions), and was dissolved by September 2007, shortly before the election. In the 2007 Polish parliamentary election, both LPR and Samoobrona failed to reach the 5% electoral threshold, losing all their 92 Sejm and 10 Senate seats. The downfall of both parties is considered to have been caused by PiS appropriating their political rhetoric.

Despite being a coalition of a far-left Samoobrona and a far-right LPR, League and Self-Defense produced a coherent program that emphasized the common points of both parties, such as their opposition to the European Union, NATO, the Iraq War and War in Afghanistan. Both parties also shared a voter base that wished for the return of security of the socialist welfare state and protection from the risks of open markets. This allowed the coalition to position itself as anti-capitalist. The coalition had a basic social program based on "protection of life from the moment of conception until natural death", anti-corruption and "zero tolerance" reforms for schools. Economically, the coalition sought a halt to privatization, empowering trade unions and greatly expanding welfare, social pensions and the minimum wage, as well as tackling foreign capital and big business. Given its higher amount of seats and popular support, the left-wing Samoobrona dominated the coalition, which gave League and Self-Defense an ideologically left-wing profile, especially economically.

== Origins ==
=== LPR and Samoobrona ===
Initially, the two parties that would found League and Self-Defence had nothing in common. Self-Defence of the Republic of Poland (Samoobrona) was considered a far-left, socialist party similar to neocommunism ideologically. Polish political scientist Jarosław Tomasiewicz described it as a "radical-populist" party that combined agrarianism, nationalism and "Soviet-style" communism. Samoobrona cooperated with fellow left-wing parties, first in the anti-austerity coalition Social Alliance for the 1998 Polish local elections, and then by supporting the 2001-2003 government of social-democratic, post-communist Democratic Left Alliance (SLD) and agrarian Polish People's Party (PSL), as well as forming local coalitions with the SLD. Samoobrona withdrew its support of the SLD-PSL government and broke all of its agreements with SLD following the decision of the SLD to forcefully break up farmer protests and continue privatization measures. PSL itself also withdrew from the coalition after SLD lifted custom duties meant to protect Polish agriculture.

In contrast, the League of Polish Families was a far-right, Catholic nationalist party that was a continuation of the National Party, an idiosyncratic party that attempted to unite nationalist movements and continue the legacy of Roman Dmowski and his movement of National Democracy. LPR mostly focused on social, cultural and moral issues, along with opposition to the European Union. In contrast to the traditionally laissez-faire, free-market outlook of Dmowski and his nationalist movement, the LPR denounced the post-communist transition to capitalism in Poland as a "socio-economic experiment" that had "greatly deleterious effects on the Polish families". LPR campaigned on an unambiguously right-wing, Catholic nationalist and traditionalist program, appealing to patriotic, nationalist and anti-capitalist values; it promoted Catholic values as "moral and material protectors" and presented itself as the defender of Polish national interests which, according to the party, were compromised by the EU, foreign capital, big companies, privatization and social welfare cuts.

=== Ideological overlap ===
The anti-capitalism of LPR allowed for some overlap, on both partisan and voter level. According to political scientists, Tomasz Zarycki and George Kolankiewicz, LPR "held objectively left-wing views on issues such as privatisation, state intervention in the economy and redistribution of wealth", combined with "strong opposition to Polish EU membership and, more generally, a nationalist and anti-cosmopolitan worldview." Samoobrona, meanwhile, presented itself as the defender of the working class, the weak, and the needy; Polish farmers and the poor began to consider Lepper their advocate. To this end, both Samoobrona and LPR appealed to those who considered themselves "losers" of the capitalist transformation and felt marginalized and excluded by the socioeconomic changes that dismantled the socialist system in Poland. Samoobrona focused almost exclusively on socioeconomic interests and had a vague cultural outlook that attempted to appeal to socially marginalized groups, including LGBT (along with SLD, Samoobrona was the only party to support same-sex civil unions in 2004), but at the same time avoid alienating the socially conservative working class. However, Samoobrona and LPR shared their opposition to the European Union and globalization. Given how Samoobrona considered SLD to have betrayed left-wing values by 2003, both LPR and Samoobrona began to see themselves as the only alternative to the establishment and economic liberalism.

=== Samoobrona's ideological shift ===
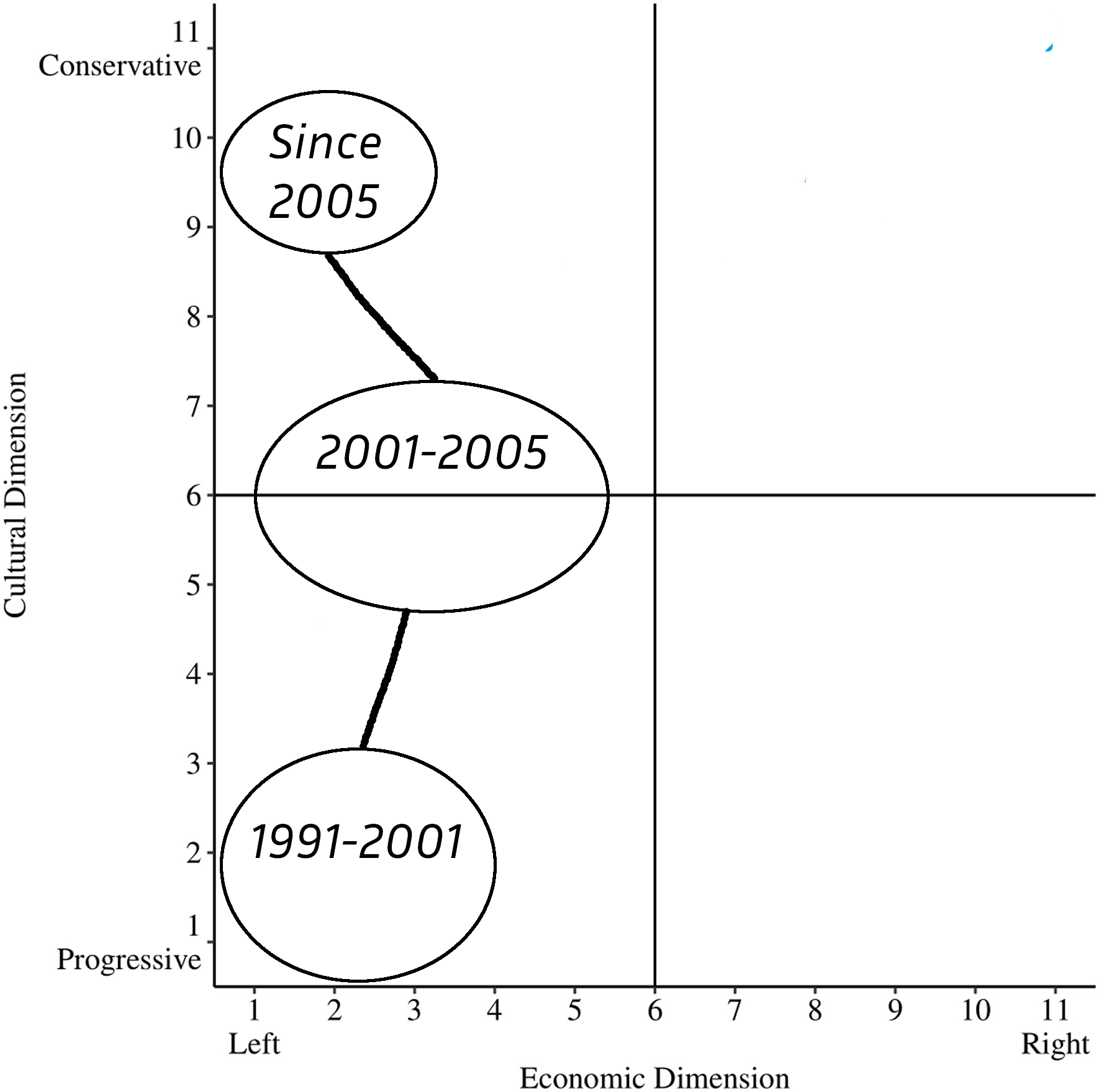
Ideological evolution of Samoobrona - since 2001, Samoobrona has been shifting towards social conservatism, making a coalition with LPR possible.

Until around 2006, the relationship between Samoobrona and LPR was cold, as LPR was hostile towards Samoobrona; this was caused by the fact that until 2003, Samoobrona was a close ally of social democratic Democratic Left Alliance. In contrast, Samoobrona was always cordial towards LPR. In 2004, Samoobrona wrote that it shared LPR's opposition to the European Union, and praised it as a new, refreshing force in the Polish politics, in contrast to establishment parties. Gazeta Wyborcza also wrote about Samoobrona's leader: "Lepper, while criticising other parties, always found a few words of praise for the LPR". However, the leader of LPR, Roman Giertych, said in 2004 that "God forbid Samoobrona ever comes to power", accusing the party of "extreme demagoguery" and "Janosik-style populism". Despite this attack, later in 2004, Lepper stated: "People are fed up with these political dabblers: the wheeler-dealers from the Democratic Left Alliance, the jumpers from the Civic Platform, the converts from Law and Justice and the bunglers from the Polish People's Party. Fortunately, there are national, Polish forces in the Sejm: Samoobrona and LPR." Nevertheless, LPR was still uncertain of Samoobrona in 2005. In a 2005 debate just two days before the 2005 Polish parliamentary election, both Lepper and Giertych were invited by Polsat to a debate with journalist Tomasz Lis. In the debate, Giertych stated: "There will be no coalition between the League of Polish Families and Self-Defence. Our programmes are like fire and water." Lepper surprised Giertych by instead wishing LPR success and arguing that both Samoobrona and LPR have some policies in common. He concluded: "Shouldn't we, the pro-Polish forces from Self-Defence, the League and PiS, form a coalition?"

Mateusz Piskorski argues that there has been a gradual shift in the ideology of Samoobrona. Throughout the 1990s, as an extra-parliamentary but an increasingly recognizable party, Samoobrona combined its far-left socioeconomic postulates with social progressivism. This culminated in Samoobrona becoming an ally of the social-democratic Democratic Left Alliance (SLD) before and shortly after the 2001 Polish parliamentary election. As a reward, SLD voted in favor of Lepper becoming the Deputy Marshal of the Sejm. However, despite being elected on a social-democratic program, SLD instead embraced neoliberalism and pursued deregulation and market liberalization - it suspended collective agreements and allowed for a suspension of working regulations "where the existence of a firm is threatened", cut overtime pay, made it easier for employers to fire workers, and reduced sickness pay. The party also implemented "Hausner Plan", named after its Finance Minister Jerzy Hausner, who abolished the annual rise in pensions and public service pay, cut business tax, reduced subsidies for mines and railways, cut sickness allowance, cut subsidies for companies employing disabled workers and increased retirement age for women. This liberal economic time made the PSL, SLD's coalition partner, leave the coalition. As a minority government, SLD continued its shift, with Leszek Miller, the leader of the SLD-led minority government, proposing to implement a flat-income tax rate. This made Samoobrona break off with the SLD, and SLD retaliated by removing Lepper as the Deputy Marshal. Afterwards, Samoobrona gradually moved away from social progressivism and started approaching social conservatism. After the 2005 Polish parliamentary election, Samoobrona further moved towards the cultural right, and became a left-authoritarian party. After the 2005 election, it was described as far-left socioeconomically and centre-right culturally. From 2006 onwards, Samoobrona was also described as a left-wing, but "radical socially conservative" party.

=== People's National Bloc ===
League and Self-Defense came directly from the Samoobrona's concept of "People's National Bloc", or "National-Agrarian Bloc" (Polish: Blok Ludowo-Narodowy). The concept of this bloc first appeared in 1999 and was actively pursued with Samoobrona until 2001; it initially referred to a possible alliance of Samoobrona with Polish People's Party as well as left-wing trade unions, such as August 80. Alliance talks were temporarily abandoned after the decision of Polish People's Party to form a government with SLD, although Samoobrona supported this government. After the SLD-PSL government fell in 2003, the concept was again brought up by Samoobrona. In the 2004 European Parliament election in Poland, LPR massively overperformed, finishing second. At this point, the concept of the "National-Agrarian Bloc" was modified to be a coalition of Samoobrona, Polish People's Party and League of Polish Families. Between 2004-2005, the prospect of this coalition appeared likely as even the leader of PSL, Janusz Wojciechowski, was supportive of the idea. However, this plan was foiled by the 2005 Polish parliamentary election, in which LPR and PSL underperformed; a Samoobrona-PSL-LPR would only have 115 seats, half of the amount needed to form a majority government.

Before Samoobrona and LPR agreed to form a coalition with Law and Justice in May 2006, Law and Justice ruled as a minority government, which sparked suggestions of early elections to allow a majority government. Law and Justice tried to form a coalition with neoliberal Civic Platform, in what would have been known as POPiS. In January 2006, Samoobrona and LPR declared that they would run together in case of early election, calling it "People's National Self-Defence-LPR Bloc" (Polish: Blok Ludowo-Narodowy Samoobrona-LPR), effectively becoming the "proto-LiS" coalition. PSL was initially hesitant towards reactivating the concept of the "People's National Bloc", stating that it would not run together with LPR and Samoobrona to Sejm, but that it is interested in organizing such coalition for the Senate. The coalition was mocked by Donald Tusk, the leader of Civic Platform, who called it "the coalition of the weak" and stated that in case talks with PiS fail, early election would take place on 26 March 2006. Ultimately, PSL changed its stance and stated it interest in forming the "People's National Bloc" together with Samoobrona and LPR. While the early 2006 election ultimately did not take place and both Samoobrona and LPR formed a coalition with PiS, this made both parties consider themselves 'natural partners'. LPR was greatly influenced by its talks with Samoobrona, abandoning its ties to National Democracy, moderating its image and putting an emphasis on agrarian issues.

Political alignment of Polish parties by political scientists Seongcheol Kim and Endre Borbáth. Samoobrona, LPR and PiS occupy socioeconomically left-wing and socioculturally conservative positions (TAN in a TAN/GAL dimension), showing alignment that made the coalition possible.

== History ==
=== Background ===
The coalition pact between Samoobrona, LPR and PiS was divided into a "rigid" and "flexibe" part. The rigid part mainly postulated the establishment of the Central Anticorruption Bureau (CBA). The "flexible" part mainly included proposals of LPR and Samoobrona: benefits for an unemployed people, and the so-called senior benefits - an annual pension of 500 PLN for the poorest pensioners. In addition, this part included a bill to expand social housing, annual indexation of pensions and disability benefits, as well as a controversial proposal to implement the "vetting of public trust professions", including ambassadors, members of the Monteray Policy Counil, bank presidents, and state-owned company executives. Reactions to the coalition were mixed - on one hand PiS was criticized for allowing LPR and Samoobrona, seen as extremist and populist parties, to enter the government, while on the other hand the coalition was seen as a success for PiS, assigning it to a dominant role in the coalition and reducing, in view of some observers, its coalition partners to "vassals".

In 2007 in Masuria, on the orders of PiS Minister of Justice Zbigniew Ziobro, Central Anti-Corruption Bureau officers posed as entrepreneurs and attempted to persuade Samoobrona MPs to accept bribes in exchange for allowing the de-agriculturalization of attractive plots of land in Masuria. The provocation was supposed to work, but the leader of Samoobrona, Andrzej Lepper, was warned about the plot by pro-Samoobrona elements in PiS. Although the plan failed, on July 9, Prime Minister Kaczyński alleged that "there are sufficient grounds to claim that Andrzej Lepper is involved in criminal activity" and removed him from the government. Lepper held the positions of Minister of Agriculture and deputy prime minister. This turn of events surprised all actors on the Polish political scene. Opposition parties filed motions for the Sejm to dissolve itself, along with motions of no confidence against all of Kaczyński's ministers. Lepper protested his innocence and claimed to have been the victim of a politically motivated 'sting' operation. He demanded that a parliamentary inquiry be conducted to investigate the legality and motivation of the CBA operation mounted against him.

Following his dismissal, Lepper participated in numerous conferences in which he accused Law and Justice politicians of illegal actions. He also filed a denunciation lawsuit against the minister coordinator of services Zbigniew Wassermann, while also stating that the head of the Central Anticorruption Bureau, Mariusz Kamiński, broke the law by initiating the sting operation against him. He lastly attacked the leader of Law and Justice and prime minister Jarosław Kaczyński of "unbelievable cynicism", as Kaczyński had long talks with Lepper about the future of the coalition, knowing that he would soon dismiss him.

=== Formation ===
Lepper's stance drew him support from his own Samoobrona party and the LPR. On 16 July 2007, a merger of the two parties was announced at a press conference conducted by Lepper and his LPR counterpart, Roman Giertych. The nature of this new 'LiS' was not made clear, and the leaders could not give any specifics as to whether LiS would take the form of a newly unified party or simply an electoral alliance of two autonomous parties. It was indicated however, that the platform of this new alliance would be mainly eurosceptic and anti-privatization. LiS also served to exert more pressure on PiS.

According to the declarations of both parties involved, the new grouping would preserve the identity of both parties. On the creation of the new party, Lepper stressed that "great injustice has been done to Samoobrona" and that one of the demands of the new grouping will be to investigate the circumstances regarding the sting operation against him. On 16 July 2007, the presidencies of both political groupings met. On 17 July 2007, the party's executive board was appointed, with Andrzej Lepper as president and Roman Giertych as chairman. On the same day, the documents for the registration of the new party were filed with the court. Party board members from the LPR included Radosław Parda, Deputy Education Minister Mirosław Orzechowski, Deputy Leader of the League Wojciech Wierzejski, while from the side of Samoobrona, board members included Deputy Speaker of the Sejm Genowefa Wiśniowska and acting head of the club Krzysztof Sikora.

The statutory bodies of the new party were the president and the chairman, which were to be elected by the party board for a 3-year-term. Both the chairman and president had the same competences, which meant a shared rule of both Lepper and Giertych. Apart from the executive board, which had 14 members, LiS also appointed its own political council, which was to consist of 20 to 60 members, as well as the program council tasked with developing the program of the party. According to the party's statute, all party bodies were to have the same number of representatives from LPR and Samoobrona, and LiS members were also allowed to remain members of their parent parties. Right before registering the party, Lepper also visited Tadeusz Rydzyk of the influential, politically involved Catholic radio station Radio Maryja, to receive Rydzyk's blessing for the new party and secure his support.

After the formation of the League and Self-Defense, Law and Justice began making demands that both Samoobrona and LPR withdraw from the idea of setting up a commission to investigate the CBA action, after which Andrzej Lepper lost his deputy prime minister's seat. Law and Justice then started replacing the ministers of the parties in the government, stripping LPR and Samoobrona of influential positions such as labour ministry ad minister of agriculture. The government lost a lot of support, especially since it also abolished ministries created specifically for the LPR and Samoobrona, such as the ministry of maritime economy and the ministry of construction. Law and Justice defended the dismissals as "these were routine resignations unrelated to politics", but the media attacked the party for nepotism. In July 2007, only 31% of voters were satisfied with the Prime Minister Jarosław Kaczyński and his Law and Justice party. The actions of Law and Justice were criticized for breaching the coalition agreement, as one of the key points of the agreement including giving Samoobrona the Ministry of Agriculture; Kaczyński's decision to fire Samoobrona's minister and replace him with one from PiS was considered to have marked a de facto end of the PiS-Samoobrona-LPR coalition.

=== Reactions ===
The reaction to the coalition within both parties were mixed, with the more radical members of LPR objecting to forming a coalition with a left-wing party; others admitted the idea of a temporary alliance, but feared integration. Some members within the party nevertheless praised the idea and claimed that they got along, especially stressing the "pro-social" stance of both groups, especially when referring to the shared opposition to privatization and deregulation measures.

The media greatly emphasized the seemingly absurd nature of the coalition. Gazeta Wyborcza wrote that Lepper is a "former communist, radical trade unionist, once an SLD ally, with fond memories of collective farms", while Giertych was described as "an heir to the National Democrats, a right-winger and a fan of Margaret Thatcher". The media also noted that Samoobrona promoted nostalgia towards the communist Polish People's Party, praising the communist secretary Edward Gierek while greatly opposing the Polish transition to capitalism, which Samoobrona emphasized by its famous slogan "Balcerowicz must go!". However, the media noted that despite the ideological conflicts, both parties were now united by their opposition to Law and Justice, along with their populist and Eurosceptic appeal; the 2006 formation of "National Agrarian Bloc" was also noted. Some Polish media were accused of being biased against the party, focusing on the scandals regarding its founding parties.

Amongst international media, the reaction was relatively positive. Austrian daily newspaper Der Standard argued that League and Self-Defense had great potential as long as it focused on the Samoobrona's socioeconomic appeal, namely its socialist orientation, protectionism and nostalgic feelings towards communist Poland. The presence of League of Polish Families, Der Standard argued, would not shock voters because of the existence of PiS, which already tried to combine left-leaning economics with social conservatism, although with a strong dominance of the latter. Andrzej Rychard argued that by reversing the configuration of PiS and instead greatly emphasizing socioeconomic issues and presenting a staunchly left-wing economic profile, League and Self-Defense could become "a better PiS". Rychard also noted that LiS polled as much as 23% in the polls. Polish media also described LiS as "a better PiS, which wants to take care of those whom PiS has forgotten".

=== Internal disputes ===
However, from the very beginning, relations between the leaders of the two groupings were marked by a high degree of distrust, and Lepper himself admitted that the coalition was situational and tactical in nature, calculated to strengthen both groupings in the eyes of the largest coalition partner. Cooperation with the LPR resulted in Samoobrona's acceptance of a proposal to table a constructive vote of no-confidence with J. Kaczmarek's candidacy for prime minister, which was Giertych's idea. As it turned out, it did not produce the expected results and the idea was soon finally abandoned.

The coalition was dominated by Samoobrona and its left-wing program. In comparison to the far-right League of Polish Families, Samoobrona had more seats in both the Sejm as well as the Senate, and had 7 times more members than LPR overall. In case of an independent run in the election, August 2007 polls showed that Samoobrona would win 8% of the vote, compared to LPR winning only 3%, which would leave the party short of the 5% electoral threshold needed to enter the Sejm. Political surveys also showed that Lepper was by far preferable to Giertych as the leader of LiS, although a majority of the surveyed wanted League and Self-Defense to nominate a young, new politician as its leader instead. To accentuate this, some Polish media commented that "without Samoobrona there is no LPR". Referencing the slogan of the party given by Lepper, "strong as a lion, cunning as a fox", Swiss newspaper Neue Zürcher Zeitung remarked that "Lepper is both a lion and a fox, while Giertych is best suited as some moraliser in a provincial church."

The domination of Samoobrona within the party was also reflected in the planned electoral lists of LiS - Samoobrona's MP Maria Zbyrowska was to lead its electoral lists in the Subcarpathian Voivodeship. Regional LPR branch protested this decision, but felt powerless to stop it. An LPR activist interviewed by the media stated: "It should be our man first because in the last two elections, we were better than Samoobrona in Podkarpacie. But we know that protests will not work." The media also used nicknames for LiS to accentuate the situation, such as "Lepper i Spółka" ("Lepper and others") or "Lewo i Sprawiedliwość" ("Left and Justice"), referring to the dominance of left-wing influences in the party.

=== Talks with PiS ===
In late July, Law and Justice attempted to maintain the ruling coalition with Samoobrona and League of Polish Families, and sent LiS conditions needed to maintain the coalition. League and Self-Defense were to agree to unconditionally support the cabinet's bills, oppose strikes, vote in favor of waiving parliamentary immunity at the request of the prosecutor's office, and abandon the demand to set up a commission of inquiry into the actions of CBA. League and Self-Defense sent a counterproposal, demanding that PiS restore the laid off ministers, depoliticise secret services, fulfill the demands of protesting trade unions, increase pensions and minimum wage, and demand higher EU subsidies for Polish farmers. Lepper also announced that he would waive his immunity if the Sejm convenes on August 2 and adopts a resolution to establish a parliamentary commission of inquiry to investigate the activities of the CBA. However, PiS rejected these proposals, and stated that the conditions of LiS would "disorganize the work of the CBA".

Jarosław Kaczyński outlined his vision for cooperation with LiS in a letter entitled “Conditions for good governance.” These conditions included the new party's support for all government proposals, refraining from any strike actions, opposition to the establishment of a parliamentary commission to investigate the CBA's action in Masuria, waiving the immunity of suspected MPs, removing from the government those who had committed serious moral abuses, and renouncing nepotism in government agencies. The conditions presented by the prime minister were aimed at completely breaking up Samoobrona and provoking its individual parliamentarians to switch to PiS or RLN, with LPR facing the same fate in the second instance. LiS agreed to the demands contained in the “Conditions for Good Governance,” stipulating, however, that social demands must be met, especially the increase in pensions and disability benefits. Kaczyński, unsatisfied with this response, began removing LiS members from the cabinet, starting with Daniel Pawłowiec, who held the position of deputy head of the Office of the Committee for European Integration. He then appointed Wojciech Mojzesowicz as Minister of Agriculture, which was a personal insult for Lepper, as he had a personal grudge against Mojzesowicz. This move by Kaczyński was seen as the official and final end of the coalition.

On 1 August 2007, Law and Justice made its last attempt to maintain a coalition by making an offer to Roman Giertych, the leader of League of Polish Families, that would include maintaining the coalition without left-wing Samoobrona. This was to be done with the help of defectors from Samoobrona, such as the People's National Movement and Self-Defence Rebirth. League of Polish Families was to absorb the dissident Samoobrona MPs and become a "pro-PiS version of LiS" that could continue the coalition. While such government would be a minority government, Law and Justice believed that it could convince more Samoobrona MPs to cross the floor by appointing Wojciech Mojzesowicz, a former high-ranking Samoobrona member and a respected farmer activist that defected to PiS, as the Minister of Agriculture. However, Giertych rejected the proposal, stating that he desires to continue League and Self-Defense together with Samoobrona; he also argued that Law and Justice has its own internal divisions, which the party is desperate to contain by maintaining the coalition.

Political illustration by Magda Wosik depicting LiS as a fox devouring a duck (symbolizing the Kaczyński brothers and PiS). LiS was considered a direct competitor to PiS with potential to displace it from its major position in Polish politics.

=== End of the government ===
Ultimately, Law and Justice did not agree to the proposals of League and Self-Defense, and on 5 August 2007, the leadership of Samoobrona voted to dissolve the cabinet coalition with Law and Justice, with 61 votes for and 8 against. On the same day, League of Polish Families also declared the coalition over and called for a new Prime Minister, denouncing Jarosław Kaczyński. However, the party also emphasized that it is open to a new coalition should PiS agree to the conditions of both LPR and Samoobrona and replace Kaczyński. In its party declaration, League of Polish Families accused Law and Justice of breaking the coalition, writing: "PiS broke the coalition - it broke the coalition agreement repeatedly. The appointment of a PiS MP as Minister of Agriculture was the most blatant proof of this. Kaczyński tore up the agreement he had signed with his own hand." Giertych also assured that League of Polish Families remains committed to League and Self-Defence, and Samoobrona consulted its decision to withdraw from the PiS-LPR-Samoobrona coalition with him. Giertych also acknowledged that early elections were now inevitable. Some PiS politicians such as Andrzej Mikołaj Dera expressed interesting of forming a reformed coalition with LiS after the election.

After dissolving the coalition, League and Self-Defense started courting the Catholic Church and the Catholic Radio Maryja, including initiating talks with Father Tadeusz Rydzyk, considered the "grey eminence" of the Polish Catholic Church, who was an ardent supporter of Law and Justice. By 22 August, 57% of Poles wanted the government to call early elections and to hold them before the end of 2007. The Sejm voted to dissolve itself on 7 September 2007, a move that was opposed by LiS, but supported by PiS as well as the opposition parties. Despite LiS mainly attacking Law and Justice, the coalition was also deeply opposed to the neoliberal Civic Platform, which was the strongest contender in the upcoming 2007 election. Danuta Hojarska, the MP of Samoobrona, accused Donald Tusk, the leader of Civic Platform, of domestic violence against his wife and drunk driving, claiming to have evidence that incriminated Tusk.

=== Rivalry with PiS ===
League and Self-Defense competed directly with PiS for votes; Samoobrona as well as LPR touted their consistent opposition to the capitalist transformation in Poland. Lepper argued that the transformation had led to misery and poverty for millions of people, the collapse of all areas of the economy except trade, and takeover of the Polish economy by foreign capital. LiS mocked the Law and Justice's slogan of the Fourth Polish Republic, arguing that it was LiS that had first the courage to criticize the changes, and to demand that "the looting of Poland" be stopped. League and Self-Defense particularly criticized PiS for its support of Polish membership in the European Union, stating that the conditions PiS agreed to join the EU were unequal. It particularly noted the bad situation of the Polish farmers, arguing that they receive the lowest production subsidies despite being most affected by the competition of other EU member states. LiS also attacked its former coalition partner for a pro-American foreign policy, and demanded immediate Polish withdrawal from Iraq and Afghanistan. It also accused PiS of neglecting the poor, and its actual policy stopping short of the universal healthcare that LiS postulated. The failure of PiS to realize policies included in the coalition agreement, such as persecuting those responsible for privatization, was also claimed by League and Self-Defense.

Polish media closely followed the emerging rivalry between both parties, which was likewise encouraged by LiS itself. Andrzej Lepper played into the media's depiction of LiS as a fox (as "lis" means "fox" in Polish) and PiS as a duck (referring to the Kaczyński brothers), using slogans such as "No bird can handle LiS" and "The Prime Minister [Jarosław Kaczyński] is leading the drive to break up LiS, but the fox is not afraid of ducks. In the wild it is that ducks are afraid of the fox." The wordplay on anthropomorphic representation of both parties was commonly mentioned by journalists, and often gave interviews with representatives of both PiS and LiS a humorous tone. When interviewing Lepper, Jacek Żakowski claimed that foxes do not swim, to which Lepper replied: "Foxes can swim. They swim the rivers, they jump into the water after the ducks and the ducks don't stand a chance." Jarosław Kaczyński responded to Lepper's remark by stating: "Predatory ducks can kidnap the fox and lift it into the air." However, Polish ornithologist Jan Lontkowski noted that it is impossible, ridiculing Kaczyński's response.

Journalist Tomasz Lis wrote of the atmosphere before the 2007 election: "Law and Justice has come under artillery fire, and from two sides. Self-Defense attacks Kaczynski's party on the social level, explaining that it has duped the voters, that it has not been able to find money to increase wages in the health and education sectors, and that it has remained deaf to the demands of the peasants. At the same time, the liberals of the Civic Platform will accuse the Kaczynski brothers of inefficiency and dictatorial tendencies. They will hold them responsible for the deterioration of political life because of their tendency to quarrel and blackmail, and their desire to destroy everyone and everything." Mirosława Drozd-Piasecka also noted the prevalence of bon mots that speak of LiS being "a fox that hunts ducks". Polish media observed that the mere survival of LiS (crossing the 8% electoral threshold for coalitions) would be a defeat for Law and Justice.

After the collapse of the government coalition, League and Self-Defense had a contradictory relationship with other main parties. It stated that it was open to another coalition with Law and Justice as long as Jarosław Kaczyński would be excluded from it in favour of a different PiS Prime Minister. At the same time, Lepper sparked controversy by encouraging a coalition between Civic Platform and Left and Democrats. When asked about Lepper's proposal, Giertych stated: "Mr Andrzej Lepper is known for his provocative statements, which are often very accurate, sometimes accurately malicious." Lepper complained about Law and Justice's authoritarian attitude towards the government and its coalition partners; he described his experience with PiS as following: "We have nothing to say. Only PiS is right, only PiS knows how to fix Poland, and we have to listen and politely raise our hands." Lepper argued that instead of snap elections, there should be a transitory government led by the Civic Platform that LiS would be willing to support; this transitory government was to open investigation into potential abuse of power committed by PiS.

=== Dissolution ===
While up to mid-August polls gave LiS 23% of popular vote, a late-August poll estimated the party's support at 12%, which then rose to 15% by 30 August. However, early September polls estimated the party's support at only 6%, which was insufficient to pass the 8% electoral threshold for coalition groupings. By 7 September, media reported that both Samoobrona and LPR activists were increasingly distancing themselves from League and Self-Defense. Samoobrona members believed that they could have won enough votes and secure their re-election on an independent Samoobrona run, and argued that because LiS electoral lists were composed together with LPR, prominent MPs of Samoobrona could lose their seats because they would occupy lower positions on the list. Samoobrona also believed that associating itself with LPR was damaging to its plans to win over left-wing voters. In turn, LPR activists increasingly preferred to run together with minor right-wing parties rather than Samoobrona.

These reports were confirmed later, as on the same day, 7 September, Roman Giertych and Andrzej Lepper announced the end of League and Self-Defence; this was caused by the opposition of the MPs of League of Polish Families and their demand that the joint lists of Self-Defence of the Republic of Poland should not include people with legal problems or burdened by moral scandals. By early September it was clear that LiS would not arise. The membership of the two parties had not been properly consulted as to their support for this idea, and the merits of the proposition had not been discussed. Many of the members of both groups saw little common ground between the two parties. Furthermore, opinion polls did not necessarily reflect that there was a significant advantage to an alliance. LPR and Samoobrona therefore decided to start independently of each other at the early 21 October legislative elections.

Most decisive behind the dissolution of League and Self-Defense was the executive committee of League of Polish Families, majority of which opted to go to the 2007 elections with the Right Wing of the Republic of Marek Jurek and the Real Politics Union instead of Self-Defence of the Republic of Poland. Later commenting on the dissolution of the coalition, Lepper also stated that no agreement has been found amongst the grassroots members of his party, who argued that the Samoobrona brand cannot disappear from the electoral lists. Lepper claimed that the Samoobrona field activists did not agree to collect signatures for LiS electoral lists. Media generally praised the decision to dissolve the party given how Samoobrona had a radically left-wing program whereas League of Polish Families was the trademark radical right populist party in Poland. Commenting on the dissolution of LiS, Samoobrona MPs stated that a major factor behind this decision was the belief that cooperation with LPR was undermining Samoobrona's credibility as a left-wing party, and discouraged the party's left-wing electorate. In a 2008 interview, Lepper spoke of LiS:

The alliance with the LPR did not come to fruition, firstly because our structures and activists were hostile to it. They absolutely did not want it at that time. Secondly, it was also impossible because we could not agree on the question of places on the lists, and no one was willing to give in to anyone else. Looking back, I think this project was a big mistake...

In a 2024 interview with Newsweek, Roman Giertych said of the coalition:

In 2007, Lepper and I agreed to run together in the LiS (Liga and Samoobrona) coalition. It was a rescue plan to help us both pass the electoral threshold, but for unknown reasons, he broke his word. I took offense and we stopped talking.

=== 2007 elections ===
After the coalition was cancelled, Samoobrona moved even further to the left and invited left-wing activists the party, such as Leszek Miller and a socialist Piotr Ikonowicz. In response, LPR condemned its erstwhile coalition partner, accusing Samoobrona of cooperating with "communist apparatchiks". LPR joined forces with Real Politics Union and Right of the Republic to form a new alliance called League of the Right of the Republic (Liga Prawicy Rzeczypospolitej). However, both parties sharply dropped in the polls following the dissolution of LiS. LPR's coalition with Real Politics Union and Right of the Republic was seen as even more ideologically inconsistent than LiS - the League of the Right of the Republic was unable to present an economic program, as the LPR held social and anti-capitalist positions, while the Real Politics Union under Janusz Korwin-Mikke presented capitalist libertarian views. This warded off LPR's voters, and the party lost 67% of its 2005 electorate to Law and Justice.

In late September, Giertych organized a press conference in which he claimed that "Lepper has gone mad", in which he attacked his former partner for inviting "communist apparatchiks" to Samoobrona's electoral lists. Giertych avoided attacking Samoobrona directly, but argued that many independents that Lepper invited to his party's electoral lists are not left-wing enough for Samoobrona, as they came from the 2001-2005 government led by social-democratic SLD. Giertych accused the members of the 2001-2005 government of "abolishing the alimony fund, deepening the poverty of pensioners and disability pensioners, wrecking the health care system and disastrous negotiations with the European Union", and appealed to Samoobrona voters to vote for LPR instead.

Elections were held on 21 October 2007, in which the LPR Committee received 209,171 or 1.30% of the vote and did not enter parliament. Polls gave the party a slightly higher support of 3 per cent. Samoobrona failed to fare much better, as it won 247,335 votes, which amounted to 1.53% of the popular vote, which meant that it also failed to keep any of its seats. This result devastated the party. Lepper and his party faced significant financial issues, and it was reported that Samoobrona's goal was not crossing the 5% electoral threshold in order to win parliamentary seats, but rather to cross at least the 3% threshold needed for state-paid reimbursement of election campaign costs. This escalated the financial problems of Samoobrona. After losing all their seats in the 2007 election, neither Samoobrona nor LPR regained political relevance. Andrzej Lepper died in August 2011 in unclear circumstances, with some ruling it as assassination and others as suicide. The Central Anticorruption Bureau, responsible for the unlawful sting operation against Lepper that ultimately ended his political career, grew unpopular and was disbanded in March 2024.

=== Continued informal existence ===
Despite the dissolution of LiS and political downfall of both LPR and Samoobrna in 2007, in 2008 and 2009 it was reported that LiS continued to exist as a "television coalition" under the PO-PSL government (2007-2015). In light of the Civic Platform's victory in the 2007 election, opposition parties such as Law and Justice and Democratic Left Alliance (SLD), as well as the president Lech Kaczyński, worked together to prevent the new PO-led government from changing the leadership of Telewizja Polska (TVP), state-owned Polish television. As a result, the leadership of TVP was dominated by members of Samoobrona and LPR who were assigned to these positions under the PiS-Samoobrona-LPR coalition. Polish political scientist Jarosław Flis remarked that the "television LiS" was also left-wing, especially as a result of its close cooperation with the social-democratic SLD, and was kept alive by the president and opposition parties in order to extract concessions from the PO-PSL governing coalition, and limit the government's influence over public media. Flis concluded that this reiteration of ‘LiS has dug himself a pretty safe burrow and it won't be easy to throw him out.’

LiS was also mentioned in the 2010 Polish presidential election. Lepper became a presidential candidate in the election, and prepared for it by reactivating Samoobrona and rebuilding its branches. He rebuilt party structures, making them heavily integrated with and based on the structures of his trade union - ZZR Samoobrona. Lepper presented himself as the candidate of the "weakest", "ordinary people" and "people from villages, small towns and cities". His rhetoric was influenced by his experiences with LiS - he portrayed himself as a "social patriot" and argued that "small communities are one of the last strongholds of Polishness in times of blind copying of American and Western models". Similarly to the intimate connection of LiS to Radio Maryja, Samoobrona heavily utilized its folk Catholicism, and Lepper frequently participated in religious practices during the campaign. Apart from his devotion to Catholicism, Lepper also appropriated the social conservatism of LiS, stating his opposition to same-sex marriage, abortion and adoption by same-sex couples. At the same time, Samoobrona retained its far-left orientation - it stated its opposition to ‘soulless capitalism’ and the European Union, arguing that Poles are treated as ‘second-class citizens’ by it. Lepper declared his sympathy and admiration for Hugo Chávez and Evo Morales, and embraced "socialism of the 21st century". This ideology was also evoked by Samoobrona in its 2007 campaign. During the election, Lepper directly referenced LiS, stating that it informally continues to exist as the Samoobrona's party convention was attended by many LPR members, and that he remains close friends with Giertych. He also said that he had forgiven Giertych his words about him after the dissolution of LiS in 2007.

== Program ==
The main objectives of the coalition were to create a commission of inquiry into the Central Anticorruption Bureau and its operations, blocking the ratification of the European Union reform treaty that both members of the coalition were opposed to, stop the privatization process and "strengthen the constitutional protection of life", which would include introducing additional restrictions on abortion. Both Samoobrona and LPR stressed opposition to the European Union as one of the main goals of the party, as both parties did not accept the EU Reform Treaty. LiS was described as a "radical, anti-European, anti-market economy and nationalist" party; Polish politicians also called it 'exotic' and 'national-socialist'. Others classified it as social nationalist. The coalition was ultimately dominated by Samoobrona which had more Sejm and Senate seats than League of Polish Families, and polled 8% on its own in August 2007, compared to LPR's 3% (which would be below the 5% electoral threshold, thus putting LPR at risk of losing all its seats). According to the polls, Lepper was also preferred to become the leader of League and Self-Defence over LPR's leader Giertych, though a majority preferred the coalition to put forward a new, "fresh face" politician as its leader instead. Polish daily Dziennik Polska-Europa-Świat remarked that "Without Samoobrona there is no LPR".

=== Foreign issues ===
Both parties were deeply opposed to the introduction of the Euro currency in Poland and also questioned the rule of supremacy of the EU law over the Polish one. According to League and Self-Defence, the European Union pursues centralization reforms that will lead to "transformation of the Union into a super-state". The coalition speculated that the European Union might plan to introduce the position of an EU president and a foreign minister, which would overrule the policy of individual member states in favor of enforcing one-for-all rulings. Both parties also agreed on their opposition to NATO, and strongly opposed the presence of Polish troops in Iraq and Afghanistan, calling for immediate withdrawal. League and Self-Defense also sought to improve Polish relations with Russia.

=== Social issues ===
On social issues, League and Self-Defense stressed its anti-corruption stance and referred to the unlawful actions of the Central Anticorruption Bureau that led to the collapse of the PiS-LPR-Samoobrona coalition. The coalition pledged to ensure that special services and authorities in Poland will behave in legal manner. The coalition also proposed to guarantee protection of life from the moment of conception until natural death, as well as an extensive education reform that would introduce "zero tolerance" program for violence and bullying at school. League and Self-Defense also postulated the foundation of a special investigative unit that would persecute and punish individuals and companies for lobbying. LiS was heavily supportive of the Catholic clergy and sought to gain the support of politically active, conservative clergy; in July 2007, Lepper made a trip to Jasna Góra Monastery to meet Tadeusz Rydzyk and ask him for an endorsement. The spokesman of Rydzyk also stated that "a large part of priests support LPR and Samoobrona". The party was publicly supported by Sławoj Leszek Głódź, the Bishop of Warsaw. The Catholicism of LiS and its connection to Catholic clergy was so strong that Lepper remarked: "Father Rydzyk and several Church hierarchs were undoubtedly the godfathers of this coalition." LiS was also referred to as "an alliance of family values".

=== Economic issues ===
Political alignment of post-1989 Polish political parties on a two-dimensional spectrum. Samoobrona is coded as SRP, League of Polish Families as LPR. Both parties are shown to align on the economic dimension.

Economically, League and Self-Defense called itself "solidarist", and envisioned a "solidarist state". The coalition called itself "pro-social" and was distinguished by its strong hostility towards privatization, which it combined with a proposal to greatly limit foreign capital in Poland and ban foreign individuals from buying Polish companies. The coalition postulated universal healthcare, and supported trade unions and labour strikes, particularly the health service employees' protest that took place in Poland in 2007. Moreover, LiS postulated a sharp rise of social pensions and the minimum wage. It also sought to diversify energy supply and develop biofuel production in Poland, which it saw as an opportunity for Polish agriculture to modernize, combined with agrarian protectionist measures and generous subsidies for Polish farmers. LiS presented itself as a party that "defends the interests of the poorest people, pensioners, farmers and employees", and represents "a kind of safety net for these people against the dangerous advances of [economic] liberalism."

Both parties forming LiS were described as socialist. When leaving the coalition with Law and Justice, LPR accused it of abandoning the "national-socialist" program that was agreed upon in the coalition pact. The economic doctrine of LPR was called "populist/socialist", and "overtly anti-capitalist". Samoobrona meanwhile, was commonly considered socialist in political science, and openly called for a return of socialism as the economic system of Poland. Similarly to LPR, Samoobrona was also referred by some as "national-socialist", Polish political scientist Jarosław Tomasiewicz described the ideology Samoobrona as consisting of the traditions of "agrarian movements, Catholic social teaching, nationalism and ‘real socialism’", as well as "combining elements of agrarianism, nationalism and communism of the Polish People's Republic".

Other common economic points of both Samoobrona and LPR that were included in the program of LiS were "family-friendly taxes" - these were to be additional taxes on the wealthy, of which the proceeds would be redistributed to low-income families. LiS also postulated an establishment of a special investigative commission that would persecute privatization and focus on halting any further privatization attempts. This commission was also to investigate Polish lobbyists and businessmen, such as Marek Dochnal. The party also stressed the need to diversify the energy supply of Poland, and opposed the construction of Nord Stream 1, a Russia-Germany Northern Gas Pipeline. The party also criticized Law and Justice for inadequate preparations for UEFA Euro 2012, and pledged to speed up the preparations. It also called for "initiating talks and meeting the demands of protesting labour groups, increasing pensions and disability benefits, increasing assistance for families, and taking action at the EU level to incrase subsidies for Polish farmers".

Explaining its concept of solidarist economy, the coalition declared: "Our program meets these expectations. It contains important elements hitherto overlooked and ignored by neo-liberal decision-makers. It is a clear programme providing social security for the most vulnerable social groups, giving hope for stabilisation and harmony. It is an incisive programme providing social security for the most vulnerable social groups, giving hope for stabilisation and harmonious development of our country." League and Self-Defense condemned the last 16 years (1991-2007) of economic policies, describing it as neoliberal and capitalist. Solidarist economy, according to LiS, was based on the protection of the poorest and the weakest, as well as disempowering and redistributing the wealth of the rich, which the coalition perceived as corrupt and greedy.

League and Self-Defense rejected capitalism as a system that causes the "McDonaldization of the planet"; conversely, neoliberalism and the tradition of economic liberalism in general were condemned as "lumpenliberalism" that is characterized by consumptionism and hedonism rather than serving the needs of the poor and disadvantaged. Both League of Polish Families and Samoobrona were anti-capitalist. League of Polish Families was described as an overtly anti-capitalist party, and Polish economist Oleg Gorbaniuk even classified LPR as an economically left-wing party. This was even stronger in case of Samoobrona, which argued that "capitalism is that system which has already outlived itself" and openly declaring itself as an anti-capitalist party, denouncing capitalism as "degenerate consumerism". The leader of Samoobrona, Lepper, also called for a return of socialism in Poland, arguing that it had "not yet reached full maturity".

=== Other stances ===
LiS accused PiS of obstructionism, and proposed to amend the rules of Sejm's procedures that would allow the chamber presidium to introduce additional entries to bills despite the Speaker of the Sejm opposing them. It also criticized PiS for the conditions of Polish membership in the EU, denouncing them as unfair and exploitative towards Poland. Giertych stated that it is one of the main goals of LiS to prevent the ratification of the EU treaty. The party was fiercely opposed to the EU and strongly opposed introduction of the Euro in Poland and the rule of EU's law supremacy over the Polish one, arguing that it would lead to the "transformation of the Union into a super-state". In order to closely regulate Polish relationship with the EU, LiS proposed to introduce a new position known as "EU President and a Foreign Minister", which would be elected for 2.5 years and directly represent Polish interests before the EU.

=== Self-description ===
The coalition referred to itself as "national agrarian" and "people's national", as to stress the right-wing character of LPR as well as the agrarian and leftist nature of Samoobrona. League and Self-Defense maintained that its creation marks the beginning of "the people's national movement". The coalition itself was considered "not very right-wing" by Polish media despite the presence of LPR in it, who noted the far-reaching criticism of privatization process in Poland and a clearly left-wing economic program. The coalition wanted to build a "vast national popular movement". Samoobrona was considered a "peasant-left" and a far-left party that sought to look after the rural voters, combined with agrarian socialist demands and an ambition to represent people who struggle financially. League of Polish Families was a far-right party described as Catholic nationalist.

Krzysztof Wołodźko, Polish commentator of the Polish state media Polskie Radio, argued that League and Self-Defense marked an important point in the political history of Poland as it represented an alliance of a post-Solidarity (LPR) and a post-communist (Samoobrona) party, thus breaking the lingering elements of the old political anti-communist/post-communist dichotomy. Wołodźko stated that the new coalition, despite its contradictions, represents the Catholic left and has a potential to become "a sovereign entity on the political scene" that integrates the "social[ist] left" with moral conservatism and religion. It descripted itself as a "true left" and "the only pro-social party" that is "an alternative to liberals". Speaking on LiS, Andrzej Lepper stated that the party "is moving towards a normal, patriotic left wing, and we are maintaining that direction".

=== Left-wing identity ===
Ideological alignment of 2007 Polish political parties. Both Samoobrona and LPR were far-left on socioeconomic issues, and right-leaning on sociocultural ones.

Samoobrona positioned itself as strongly anti-neoliberal and ran to the far-left, much left than the social-democratic and post-communist Democratic Left Alliance. While this threatened the stability of the (ultimately short-lived coalition), it also gave it a discernible left-wing populist leaning. Polish sociologist Andrzej Rychard noted that the coalition was ultimately anti-capitalist and economy-oriented, as the voters of both parties shared longing for the security of the socialist welfare state and protection from the risks of open markets. LiS responded to this not only through its anti-capitalist rhetoric, but also through its proposals such as higher pensions and minimum wage and special subsidies for the unemployed and subsidies for agriculture. The coalition also mixed in nationalist rhetoric, proposing a bill that would severely limit foreign land ownership and capital in Poland, especially the German one. Some also referred to LiS as "Left and Justice" (Polish: Lewo i Sprawiedliwość), to accentuate the similarity of the acronym to PiS and the LiS' leftist identity.

In the coalition, Samoobrona centered the electoral message of League and Self-Defense on 'human dignity', which Samoobrona aspired to portray itself as its guardian. Despite the presence of League of Polish Families in the coalition, Samoobrona created an image of a left-wing identity for the party, running to the left of the electoral alliance the Left and Democrats and representing the people in need of state support in economic and social terms. Political pundits observed that the Samoobrona tried to maintain its image as an agrarian party representing rural environments, while also affirming its far-left identity and attracting far-left voters. League of Polish Families left the economic imagery to Samoobrona and tried to 'complete' the coalition's image by stressing the importance of tradition, Catholic values and patriotism. LPR appealed directly to PiS voters through law-and-order and anti-corruption rhetoric.

German magazine Stern noted the dominating role of Lepper, which it called "Polish Hugo Chávez" and described his ideology as "populist mixture of socialism and nationalism." Describing his decision to create the LiS coalition, Stern described it as risky, but noted the potential of his rhetoric, writing that Lepper "shouts out loud what the poor and frustrated only dare to whisper."

By the initiative of Samoobrona, League and Self-Defence also attempted to enter agreements with left-wing parties and expand LiS beyond just the two founding parties. LiS reached out to a newly formed Leftist Agreement (Polish: Porozumienie Lewicy) composed of the Reason Party, Edward Gierek's Economic Revival Movement, Polish Socialist Party and the Polish Labour Party - August 80. Lepper wrote a letter that was presented at the founding congress of Leftist Agreement. Meanwhile, LPR sought to reach out to centrist and right-wing parties within LiS, but only for the sake of a temporary agreement to collectively oppose the new treaty with the European Union; this anti-EU bloc was to include the Polish People's Party, Piast Faction, Right Wing of the Republic and Real Politics Union. However, these parties stated that they would not cooperate with LiS, and would only enter potential agreements with LPR individually.

=== Conflicting nature ===
Commenting on the conflicting nature of the coalition, Kurier Poranny remarked: "Such a marriage, however, is surprising, and above all to the voters of both Samoobrona and LPR. For how can one explain to a farmer from Sokółka that his new party, apart from direct subsidies, is going to fight with some Gombrowicz or argue about the national character of the state in Brussels? On the other hand, how will an LPR activist feel about being soiled in pig mud?" This referred to the fact that Samoobrona was a left-wing (both by self-identification as well as political classification) and had an almost exclusively economic-oriented rhetoric, wishing to represent the farmers and disadvantaged groups. Dutch political scientist Gerrit Voerman remarked that Samoobrona sought to represent those who "found themselves on the edge of poverty and despair" as a result of capitalist reforms and described it as "the voice of the poor, deprived and humiliated"." In contrast, League of Polish Families was a national-Catholic and an ultra-nationalist party that was placed in the far-right. Both parties nevertheless found common points and accentuated them, such as their opposition to the Polish involvement in Afghanistan and Iraq, along with a denunciation of the foreign policy of the United States.

There were also some notable differences between the programs of Samoobrona and LPR, beyond their completely different positions on the political spectrum. Samoobrona supported the abolition of Polish Senate, envisioning an alternative chamber that would instead field trade unions and represent their interests; LPR, in contrast, defended the Senate as a symbol of Polish statehood. Samoobrona was also heavily opposed to conscription and postulated a completely professional Polish army. League of Polish Families, however, envisioned compulsory universal military service. Polish sociologist Jacek Wódz also noted the contradictory nature of the party when it comes to its place in Polish politics, as it was unknown what parties LiS could form a coalition with, if any. Wódz concluded that a coalition of LiS with an ideologically incompatible party would be possible. He concluded: "Anything is possible in Polish politics. Since Law and Justice, an extremely anti-communist party, has reached an agreement with Samoobrona, a grouping one hundred percent derived from the previous [communist] system, then further volleys will no longer be a sensation."

On 17 July 2007, Dziennik Polski interviewed famous Polish political scientist Antoni Dudek, in regards to LiS. Dudek argued that Samoobrona and LPR were extremely different from each other, and they are only united in their opposition to Law and Justice. Dudek stated both parties were economically populist, but otherwise LPR was a radically nationalist party, whereas Samoobrona was "clearly leftist" given that its voter base was heavily supportive of the Polish People's Republic. He also noted that while both parties were extremist, the extremism of Samoobrona was not ideological in nature, but "pragmatic". Dudek believed that the electorate of LPR will not be satisfied by the populism and pragmatism of Samoobrona, as the support for LPR was based on Catholic fundamentalism and social conservatism, whereas Samoobrona gathered following thanks to communist nostalgia and its socialist proposals.

=== Support base ===
Both Samoobrona and LPR had a similar voter base, as they were overwhelmingly backed by poor and rural voters, and generally performed the best in Eastern Poland as well as areas that experienced decline under the free market - peripheral cities and industrial wastelands. In August 2007, Centre for Public Opinion Research surveyed the LiS electorate (election forecast - 6%). The electorate of this coalition was of various ages, with the 35-44 age group being relatively the most numerous (10%). The coalition found the greatest acceptance primarily among residents of rural areas and small towns (up to 20,000 inhabitants). The specificity of this group in terms of education and professional profile was clear - more often people with primary education, unskilled workers and farmers, most often working on private farms. A large overrepresentation (in relation to the election forecast) was recorded in the group of housewives (as many as 17% of all housewives). LiS voters are those who declare rather active (1-2 times a month) participation in religious practices (10%). Less than half of the electorate allowed voting for the parties that make up LiS (Samoobrona's negative electorate - 55%, LPR - 46%). The position of both parties in this context has deteriorated significantly over several months.

== Election results ==
=== Sejm ===
Election year	Party	# of votes	% of vote	# of overall seats won	+/–	Government
2007	Samoobrona	247,335	1.5 (#5)	0 / 460	▼56	Extra-parliamentary
2007	League of Polish Families	209,171	1.3 (#6)	0 / 460	▼34	Extra-parliamentary

=== Senate ===
Election year	Party	# of votes	% of vote	# of overall seats won	+/–	Government
2007	Samoobrona	345,427	1.1 (#5)	0 / 100	▼3	Extra-parliamentary
2007	League of Polish Families	293,289	0.9 (#6)	0 / 100	▼7	Extra-parliamentary

== See also ==
- Lithuanian Farmers, Greens and Christian Families Union
- Self-Defence of the Republic of Poland
- League of Polish Families
- Social Alliance (Poland)
- Querfront
- Justicialist Party
