= Parda =

Parda may refer to:

- Lablab purpureus, a species of bean
- L-DOPA, a chemical also known by the trade name Parda
- Parda (grape), a Spanish wine grape
- Parda (surname), people with this name
- A feminine form of pardo

== See also ==
- Parda Hai Parda (disambiguation)
- Purdah, a religious and social practice of female seclusion prevalent among some Muslim and Hindu communities
- Purdah (film), 2018 Indian documentary against the practice
- Purdah (pre-election period), election rules in the United Kingdom
