= POPiS =

Coalition between Civic Platform and Law & Justice in Poland

Civic Platform – Law and Justice Platforma Obywatelska – Prawo i Sprawiedliwość
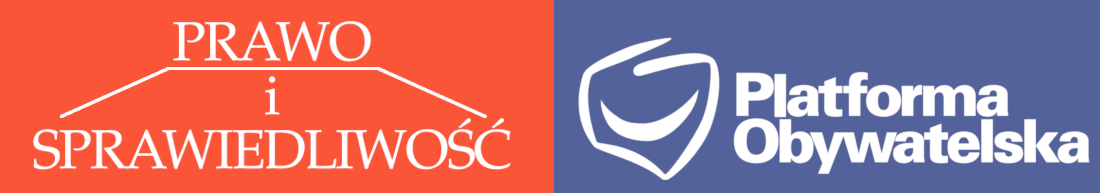
- Founder: Maciej Płażyński (PO) Donald Tusk (PO) Lech Kaczyński (PiS) Jarosław Kaczyński (PiS)
- Founded: 2002
- Dissolved: 2005
- Ideology: Christian democracy Liberal conservatism
- Political position: Centre-right
- Constituent parties: Civic Platform Law and Justice

POPiS was a coalition of Civic Platform (PO) and Law and Justice (PiS) in 2002 Polish local elections and predicted coalition above all in the 2005 Polish parliamentary election. The PO-PiS Committee issued letters to 14 out of 16 voivodeship assemblies and to the municipal council of Rzeszów. In the Podkarpackie Voivodeship, PO and PiS also started from joint lists, but a number of other formations were also present on them (derived from AWS), and the committee was called Podkarpacie Razem. Only in the Masovian Voivodeship did PO and PiS issue separate letters to the regional assemblies. In the elections to district councils, municipal councils (except for Rzeszów) and mayors, the PO-PiS committee was not appointed (these parties often ran separately). The PO-PiS committee obtained 12.11%, winning 79 seats placing 4th.

Following Law and Justice' victory at the 2005 elections, with Civic Platform achieving second place, the two parties attempted to negotiate a coalition agreement. On September 27, 2005, Law and Justice (PiS) proposed Kazimierz Marcinkiewicz for the position of Prime Minister. The first round of negotiations, held on September 29, brought no results. On October 19, 2005, the day of the first sitting of the 5th Sejm and the resignation of Marek Belka’s government, President Aleksander Kwaśniewski designated Kazimierz Marcinkiewicz as Prime Minister. At the same time, several meetings took place between Kazimierz Marcinkiewicz and Jan Rokita regarding a coalition agreement and the formation of a cabinet. The PiS leadership demanded that Civic Platform (PO) provide the name of its candidate for the position of Deputy Prime Minister. A few days later, PO announced that it was Jan Rokita.

The talks were hampered by conflicts between both sides due to the presidential campaign taking place at the same time. However, after Lech Kaczyński’s victory in the presidential elections, the negotiations became more difficult as the situation of the potential coalition partners had changed. Both sides emphasized that reaching an agreement was not a foregone conclusion.

On October 26, 2005, a confrontation between the two parties took place in the Sejm. Civic Platform (PO) put forward Bronisław Komorowski, not supported by Law and Justice (PiS), as a candidate for Speaker of the Sejm. However, the candidate backed by PiS, MP Marek Jurek, was elected instead, while Bronisław Komorowski became Deputy Speaker. PO leader Donald Tusk then questioned the possibility of forming a joint government between PiS and PO. Since the failed negotiations between the two parties in 2005–2006, the Civic Platform and Law and Justice have become bitter opponents. The Polish political scene has since been dominated by the rivalry of these two groups. The prospects of any collaboration between these two parties in the immediate future appear to be slight. In May 2006, Law and Justice instead successfully negotiated a coalition agreement with the controversial Samoobrona and League of Polish Families parties.

The Polish word popis means a 'show' or 'display', and is now used mostly in an ironic context. In later years, the term POPiS also became a term used by supporters of groups other than PO and PiS, in relation to the dominance of these parties on the political scene, a kind of political duopoly, or as a presumption of a behind-the-scenes deal.

== Electoral history ==
=== Regional assemblies ===
Election year	Votes	% of vote	# of overall seats won	+/–
2002	1,351,856	12.11 (#4)	79 / 561	New

== See also ==
- Senate 2001
- Solidarity Electoral Action
- Uniparty
- PSD–PNL Alliance (equivalent union of the two largest Romanian parties)
