= Second Belka cabinet =

Polish cabinet appointed in June 2004

- 12th Cabinet of Poland
- 2004–2005
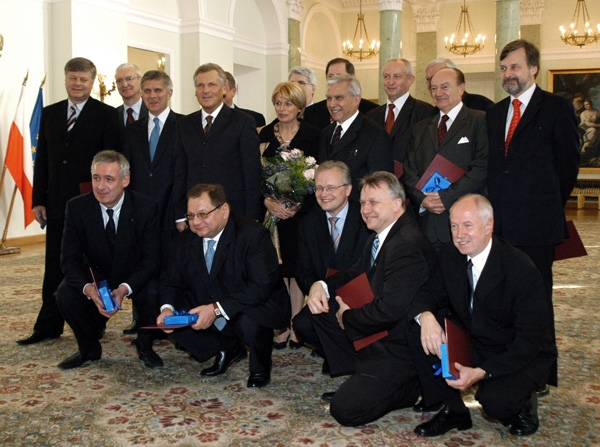
- Date formed: 11 June 2004
- Date dissolved: 31 October 2005

People and organisations
- President: Aleksander Kwaśniewski
- Prime Minister: Marek Belka
- Prime Minister's history: 2004 – 2005
- Deputy Prime Ministers: Jerzy Hausner; Izabela Jaruga-Nowacka
- No. of ministers: 17
- Member parties: Democratic Left Alliance Labour Union Social Democracy of Poland
- Status in legislature: Minority (coalition)
- Opposition party: Civic Platform Samoobrona Law and Justice Polish People's Party League of Polish Families
- Opposition leader: Donald Tusk

History
- Election: 2001 parliamentary election
- Predecessor: Belka I
- Successor: Marcinkiewicz

The second Cabinet of Marek Belka was appointed on 11 June 2004, passed the votes of confidence in parliament on 24 June 2004 and 15 October 2004.

== The Cabinet ==
Office	Image	Name	Party	From	to
Prime Minister		Marek Belka	Democratic Left Alliance	11 June 2004	31 October 2005
Chairman of the Committee for European Integration		Marek Belka	Democratic Left Alliance	11 June 2004	31 October 2005
Minister of Sport		Marek Belka	Democratic Left Alliance	1 September 2005	31 October 2005
Deputy Prime Minister		Jerzy Hausner	Democratic Left Alliance	11 June 2004	31 March 2005
Minister of Economy and Labor		Jerzy Hausner	Democratic Left Alliance	11 June 2004	31 March 2005
Deputy Prime Minister		Izabela Jaruga-Nowacka	Labour Union	11 June 2004	31 October 2005
Minister without portfolio		Izabela Jaruga-Nowacka	Labour Union	11 June 2004	24 November 2004
Minister of Social Policy		Izabela Jaruga-Nowacka	Labour Union	24 November 2004	31 October 2005
Minister of Foreign Affairs		Włodzimierz Cimoszewicz	Democratic Left Alliance	11 June 2004	5 January 2005
Minister without portfolio		Sławomir Cytrycki	Democratic Left Alliance	11 June 2004	31 October 2005
Minister of Interior and Administration		Ryszard Kalisz	Democratic Left Alliance	11 June 2004	31 October 2005
Minister of Science and Information		Michał Kleiber	Independent	11 June 2004	31 October 2005
Minister of Agriculture and Rural Development		Wojciech Olejniczak	Democratic Left Alliance	11 June 2004	31 May 2005
Minister of National Defence		Jerzy Szmajdziński	Democratic Left Alliance	11 June 2004	31 October 2005
Minister of Culture		Waldemar Dąbrowski	Independent	11 June 2004	31 October 2005
Minister of Social Policy		Krzysztof Pater	Independent	11 June 2004	24 November 2004
Minister of State Treasury		Jacek Socha	Independent	11 June 2004	31 October 2005
Minister of Finance		Andrzej Raczko	Independent	11 June 2004	21 July 2004
Minister of Infrastructure		Krzysztof Opawski	Independent	11 June 2004	31 October 2005
Minister of National Education and Sport		Mirosław Sawicki	Independent	11 June 2004	1 September 2005
Minister of National Education		Mirosław Sawicki	Independent	1 September 2005	31 October 2005
Minister of Environment		Jerzy Swatoń	Independent	11 June 2004	25 April 2005
Minister of Health		Marian Czakański	Independent	11 June 2004	15 July 2005
Minister of Justice		Marek Sadowski	Independent	11 June 2004	6 September 2004
Minister of Economy and Labor		Jacek Piechota	Democratic Left Alliance	31 March 2005	31 October 2005
Minister of Agriculture and Rural Development		Józef Pilarczyk	Democratic Left Alliance	31 May 2005	31 October 2005
Minister of Health		Marek Balicki	SDPL	15 July 2005	31 October 2005
Minister of Finance		Mirosław Gronicki	Independent	21 July 2004	31 October 2005
Minister of Justice		Andrzej Kalwas	Independent	6 September 2004	31 October 2005
Minister of Foreign Affairs		Adam Rotfeld	Independent	5 January 2005	31 October 2005
Minister of Environment		Tomasz Pogdajniak	Independent	25 April 2005	31 October 2005
