= Parda (surname) =

Parda is a surname. Notable people with the surname include:

- Catarina Parda (1862–?), Brazilian slave and prostitute
- Radosław Parda (born 1979), Polish politician
