= Parda Hai Parda =

Parda Hai Parda (transl. It's a purdah) may refer to:

- "Parda Hai Parda" (song), a song by Mohammed Rafi and Amit Kumar from the 1977 Indian film Amar Akbar Anthony
- Parda Hai Parda (film), a 1992 Indian Hindi-language film

== See also ==
- Parda (disambiguation)
