= Witold Bałażak =

Polish politician (born 1964)

Deputy of the V Sejm
- In office 2005 – 2007
- Constituency: 17 Radom

Personal details
- Born: 15 November 1964 (age 60); Radom, Polish People's Republic
- Political party: League of Polish Families

Witold Mieczysław Bałażak (born 15 November 1964 in Radom) is a Polish politician. He was elected to the Sejm on 25 September 2005, gaining 6,420 votes in 17 Radom district as a candidate from the League of Polish Families list.

Since 10 October 2009, Bałażak has been the chairman of the League of Polish Families.

== See also ==
- Members of Polish Sejm 2005-2007
