= Izabela Jaruga-Nowacka =

Polish politician (1950–2010)

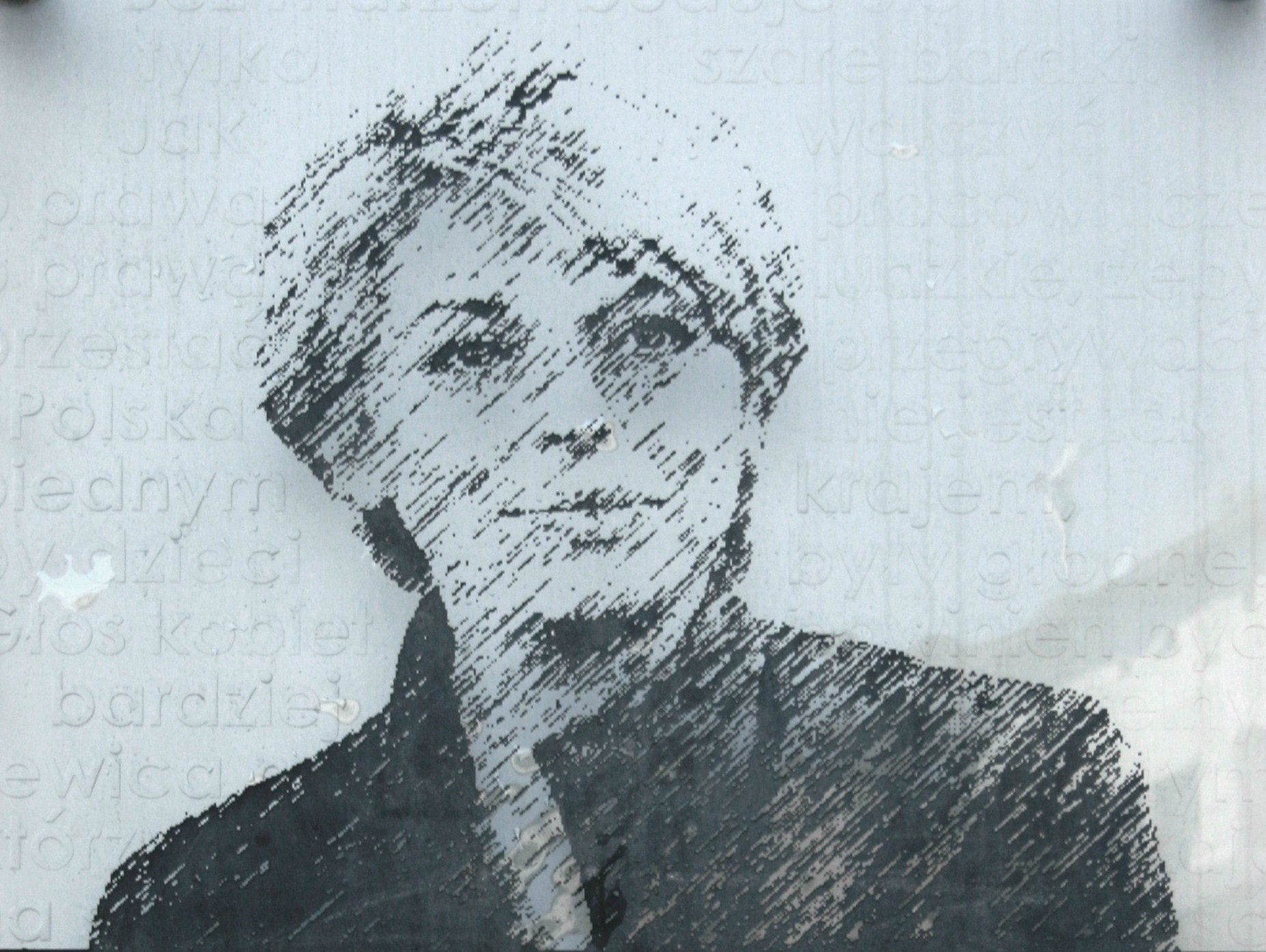

Deputy Prime Minister of Poland
- In office 2 May 2004 – 31 October 2005
- President: Aleksander Kwaśniewski
- Prime Minister: Marek Belka
- Preceded by: Marek Belka; Jarosław Kalinowski; Marek Pol
- Succeeded by: Ludwik Dorn; Zyta Gilowska; Roman Giertych; Andrzej Lepper

Minister of Social Policy
- In office 24 November 2004 – 31 October 2005
- President: Aleksander Kwaśniewski
- Prime Minister: Marek Belka
- Preceded by: Krzysztof Pater
- Succeeded by: Krzysztof Michałkiewicz

Member of the Sejm
- In office 14 October 1993 – 20 October 1997
- Constituency: 26 - Słupsk
- In office 19 October 2001 – 10 April 2010

Government Plenipotentiary for Equal Treatment
- In office 17 December 2001 – 16 August 2004
- Succeeded by: Magdalena Środa

Personal details
- Born: 23 August 1950 Gdańsk, Poland
- Died: 10 April 2010 (aged 59) Smolensk, Russia
- Cause of death: Airplane Crash
- Party: Democratic Left Alliance
- Children: 2, including Barbara

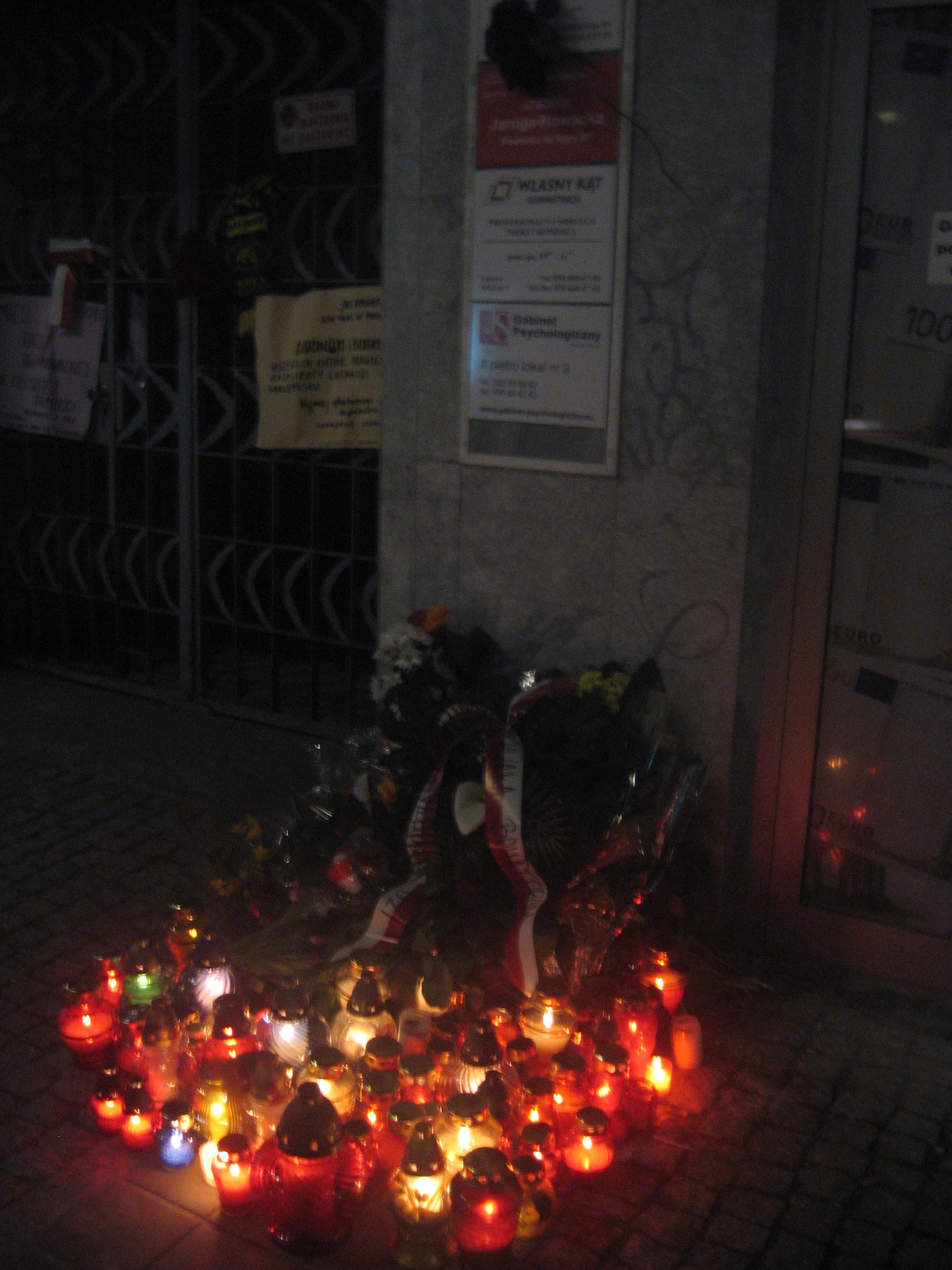
Flowers and candles before office of Izabela Jaruga-Nowacka in Gdynia

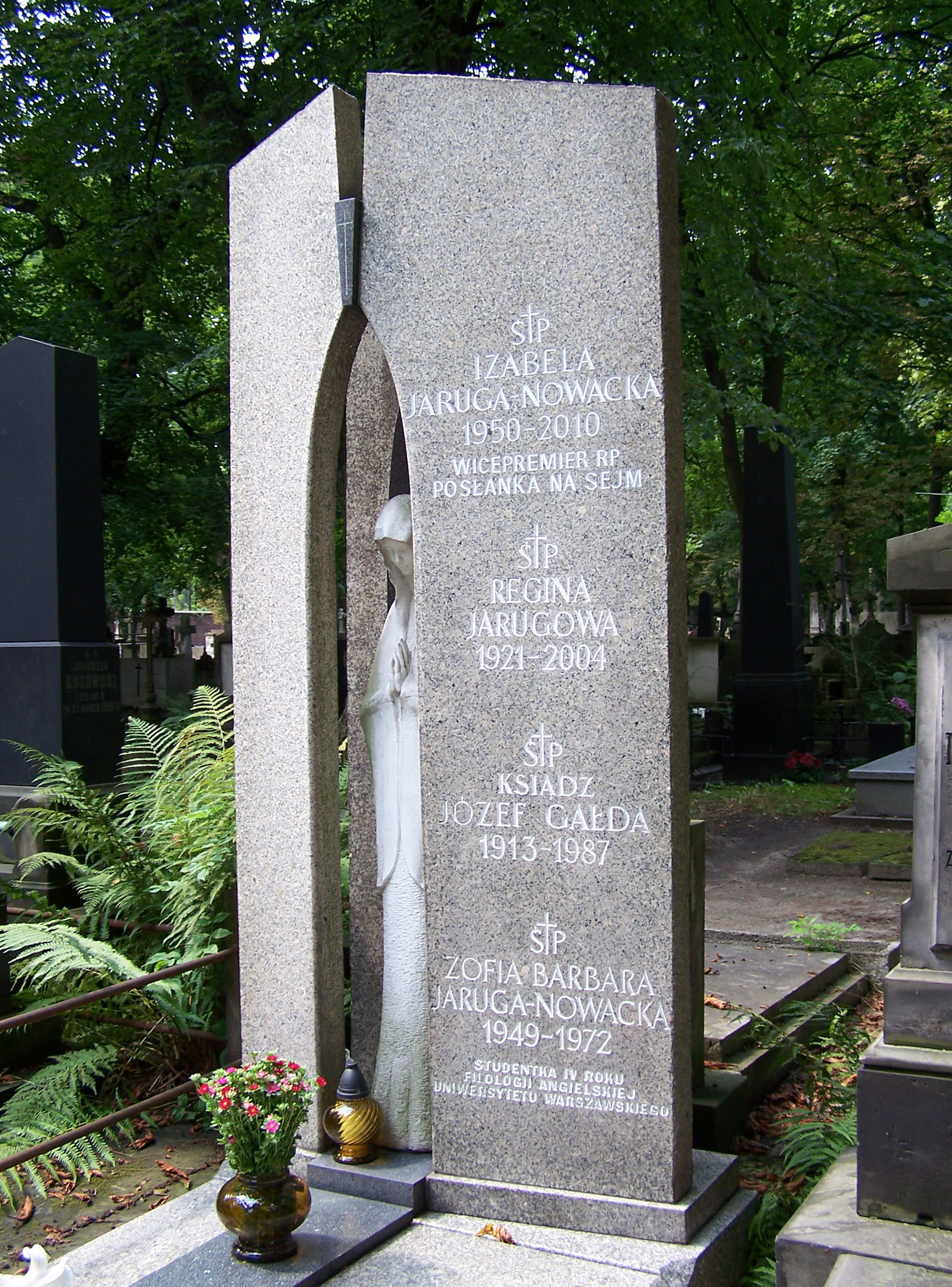
Family grave at Powązki Cemetery in Warsaw

Izabela Walentyna Jaruga-Nowacka [izaˈbɛla jaˈruɡa nɔˈvat͡ska] (23 August 1950 – 10 April 2010) was a Polish political figure who had served in the national Parliament (Sejm) since 1993 (with a four-year hiatus in 1997–2001) and, in May 2004, rose to become Deputy Prime Minister under Prime Minister Marek Belka, serving until October 2005, while also, concurrently, filling in his cabinet, from November 2004 to October 2005, the position of Minister Polityki Społecznej [Minister for Social Policy].

A native of the Baltic seaport city of Gdańsk, the capital of the Pomeranian Voivodeship, Izabela Jaruga-Nowacka earned a degree in ethnography from the University of Warsaw and, during the 1970s and 80s was employed at the Institute for Science Policy and Higher Education (1974–76) and the Institute of Socialist Nations at the Polish Academy of Sciences (1976–86). Although not politically active during the Communist period, near its end, in the mid-1980s, she joined the League of Polish Women then, in 1991, became active in Ruch Demokratyczno-Społeczny [Democratic-Popular Movement] and, in the election of 1993, was elected to the Sejm as a member of the Labor Union party.

A dedicated feminist, she remained a member of Sejm 1993–97, Sejm 2001–05, Sejm 2005–07 and was elected for the fourth time in October 2007, running on the platform of the new Left and Democrats party.

Izabela Jaruga-Nowacka and her husband, mathematician Jerzy Nowacki, rector of the Warsaw-based Polish-Japanese Institute of Information Technology, have two daughters, Barbara and Katarzyna.

She was listed on the flight manifest of the Tupolev Tu-154 of the 36th Special Aviation Regiment carrying the President of Poland Lech Kaczyński which crashed near Smolensk-North airport near Pechersk near Smolensk, Russia, on 10 April 2010, killing all aboard.

On 16 April 2010, Jaruga-Nowacka was posthumously awarded the Commander's Cross with Star of the Polonia Restituta.
