= Radosław Parda =

Polish politician (born 1979)

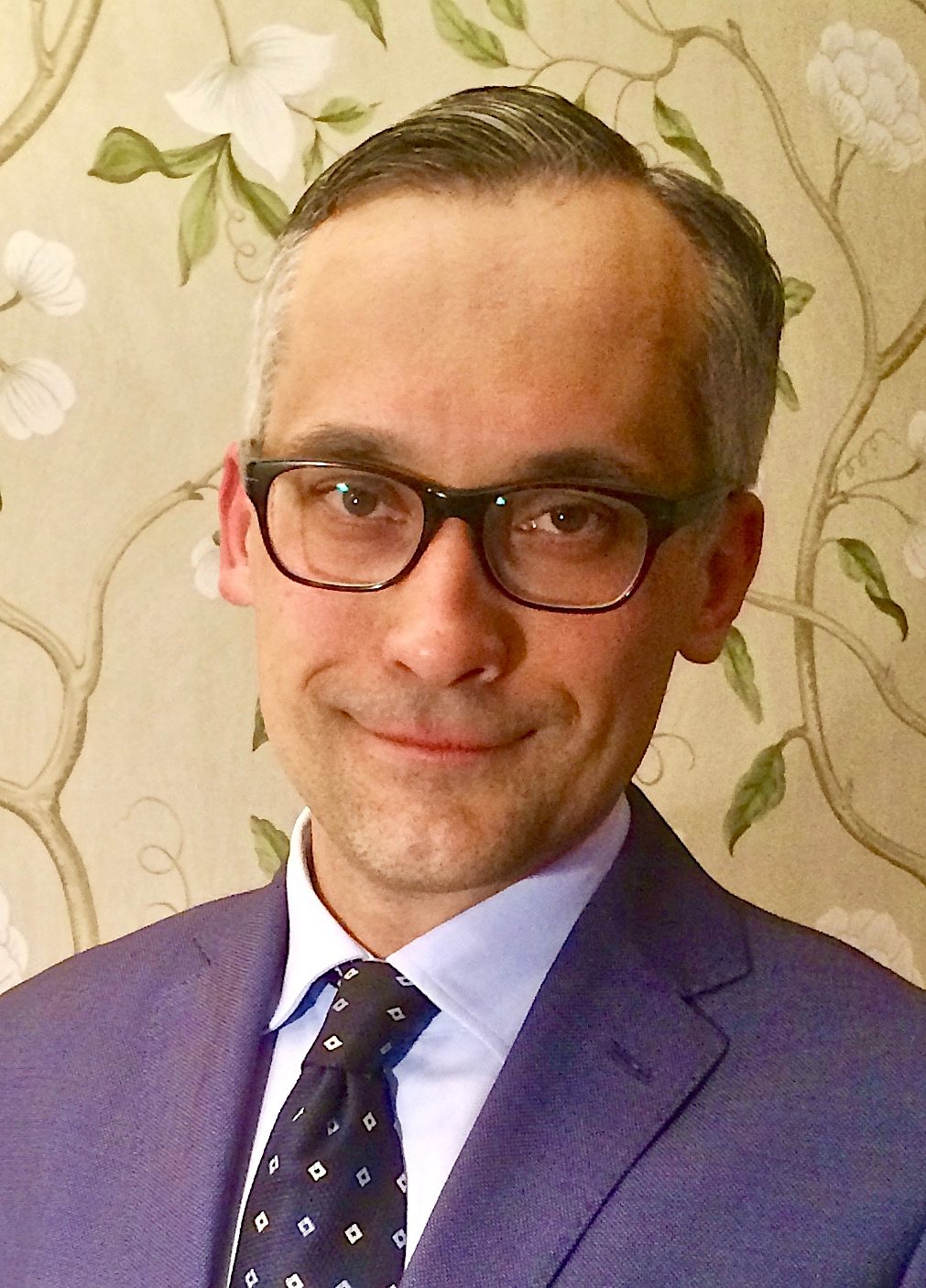

member of Sejm 2005-2007
- In office 25 September 2005 – 2007

Personal details
- Born: 28 June 1979 (age 46)
- Party: League of Polish Families

Radosław Parda (born 28 June 1979 in Wrocław) is a Polish politician. He was elected to the Sejm on 25 September 2005, getting 7856 votes in 33 Kielce district as a candidate from the League of Polish Families list.

== Biography ==
In 2004 he graduated from law studies at the University of Wrocław, and in 2009 also post-graduate studies at the Warsaw School of Economics. From 1993 to 1999 he belonged to the Polish Scouting and Guiding Association. In 1994, he joined the All-Polish Youth, in which he was president of the Wrocław circle, vice-president and then president of the Lower Silesian region. In the years 2002-2004, he served as a member of the general council and treasurer of this organization. Then until April 2005 its president, and from November 2005 to December 2006, chairman of the court of friends. From 2002 to 2005 he was a member of the Lower Silesian Regional Assembly, and held the position of its chairman for a year.

From the list of the League of Polish Families he unsuccessfully applied for parliamentary elections in 2001 to the Sejm in the Wrocław district (he received 293 votes), and in the 2004 elections to the European Parliament in the Lower Silesian-Opole region (received 4507 votes). Before the presidential election in 2005, he managed the election staff of Maciej Giertych.

In the 2005 Polish parliamentary election, he obtained a parliamentary mandate from the Kielce District with 7856 votes. He sat on the Ministry on Sport and Tourism, the European Union Affairs Committee, the Administration and Internal Affairs Committee and the Justice and Human Rights Committee. He was also the treasurer and then the vice-president of the parliamentary club. From 13 May 2006 to 27 April 2007 he was the secretary of state in the Ministry of Sport. In early parliamentary elections in 2007, he unsuccessfully applied for re-election in the Sejm elections (he received 1126 votes).

In December 2007, he became the proxy for Euro 2012 in Telewizja Polska. Then he became the deputy administrative director of TVP. In 2010, he became the president of a company operating in the lobbying services sector.

== See also ==
- Members of Polish Sejm 2005-2007
