= League of the Right of the Republic =

Short-lived Polish political alliance

The League of the Right of the Republic (Polish: Liga Prawicy Rzeczypospolitej, LPR) was a short-lived Polish political alliance between the national conservative Christian right League of Polish Families (LPR), the conservative-libertarian Real Politics Union and the conservative Right of the Republic on 10 September 2007, in the run-up to the 2007 parliamentary election. The merger was decided when it became apparent that the merger between the League of Polish Families and the Self-Defense of the Polish Republic called League and Self-Defense would not take place. The coalition disbanded however very quickly after the elections.

== Well-known politicians ==
- Marek Jurek, former Sejm's Speaker (Right of the Republic)
- Roman Giertych, former Minister of Education (League of Polish Families)
- Janusz Korwin-Mikke, (Real Politics Union)
