= Krzysztof Michałkiewicz =

Polish politician (born 1953)

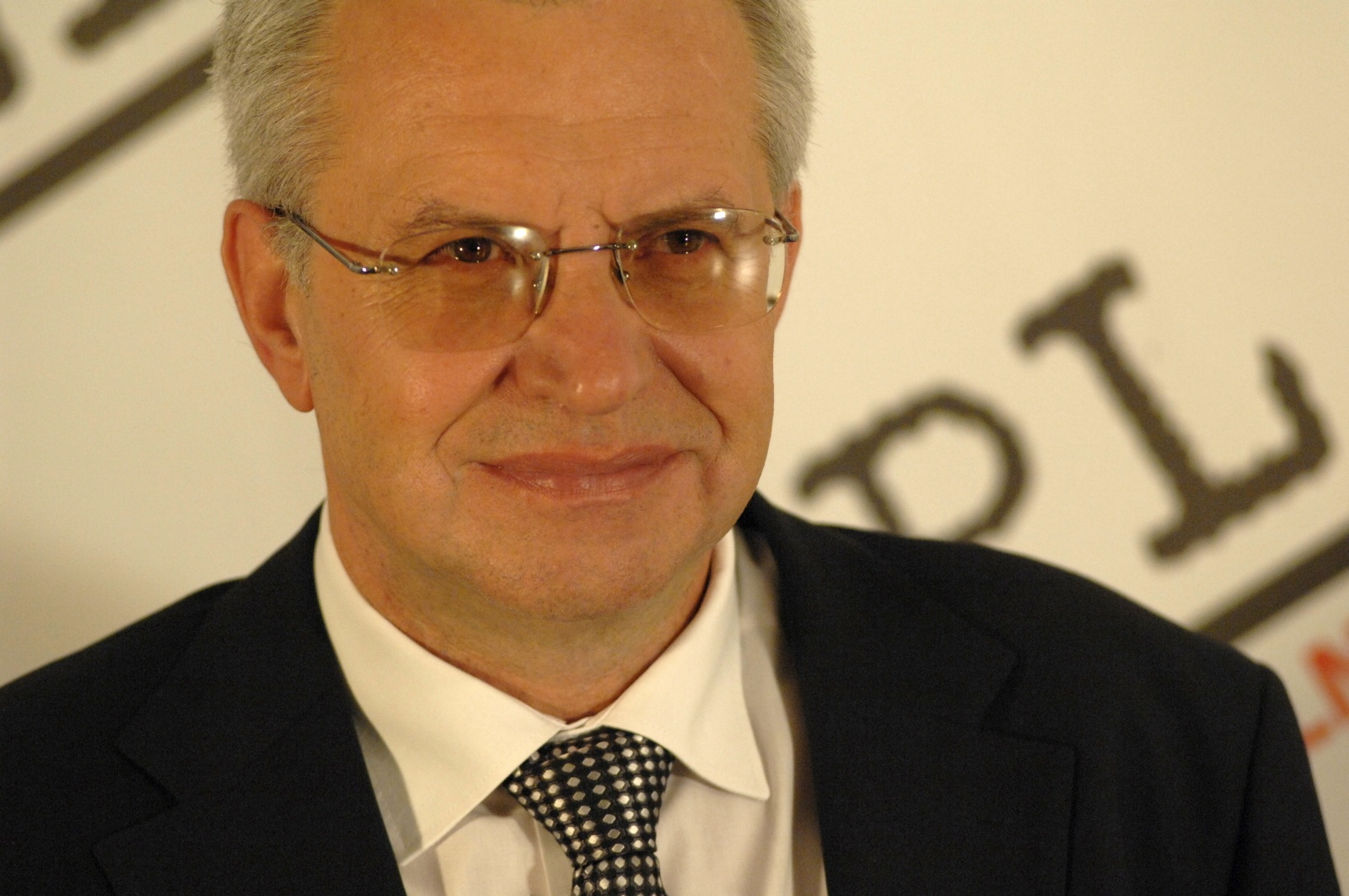

Member of the Sejm
- In office 18 October 2005 – 12 November 2019
- Constituency: 6 – Lublin

Minister Labour and Social Policy
- In office 31 October 2005 – 5 May 2006

Personal details
- Born: 1953 (age 72–73)
- Party: Law and Justice

Krzysztof Stefan Michałkiewicz (born 26 September 1953 in Oborniki Śląskie) is a Polish politician. He was elected to the Sejm on 25 September 2005, getting 11,246 votes in 6 Lublin district as a candidate from the Law and Justice list.

== See also ==
- Members of Polish Sejm 2005-2007
