= Catarina Parda =

Enslaved Brazilian woman

- Born: c. 1862; Rio Grande do Norte, Brazil
- Occupation: Enslaved domestic worker
- Known for: Legal testimony against sexual exploitation of enslaved women
- Notable work: Judicial case (Rio de Janeiro, 1879)

Catarina Parda (born c. 1862) was an enslaved Brazilian woman. Her name surname "Parda" means brown or mulatto in English, and she appears in documents of judicial processes that were emblematic for discussion on individual rights during her lifetime.

== History ==
Parda was born on a farm in Rio Grande do Norte, Brazil. She was sold into slavery at 17 years of age to João Fonseca, Rio de Janeiro, who then sold her to Mrs. Amélia Francelina Cabral de Azevedo.

In 1879 in Rio de Janeiro, Cabral de Azevedo was reported to police for prostituting her underage seventeen year old slave, Catarina Parda. Parda's statement to police confirmed the reports that she was being exploited sexually, financially and physically by Azevedo. Parda stated that she was forced into prostitution and displayed half-naked at the window of the home to passers-by. She was physically and financially abused if she failed to get enough clients, and was threatened with the House of Correction if she refused to comply.

The laws of the time protected the interests of property owners over the rights of slaves and Parda was released back into the custody of Azevedo.

== Influence ==
Parada's case, and many others reported by Municipal judge, Miguel Jose Tavares in 1871, served to highlight the public outcry against what was described at the time as the "immoral scandal of the prostitution of slave women".
