= Ministry of Social Policy (Poland) =

Ministry of Social Policy was established on 2 May 2004 be the government of Marek Belka. It was separated from the Ministry of Economy, Labour and Social Policy. It was liquidated by the government of Kazimierz Marcinkiewicz, who included social policy in the newly established Ministry of Labour and Social Policy.

== List of ministers ==
- Krzysztof Pater (2004)
- Izabela Jaruga-Nowacka (2004–2005)
