= League of Polish Families =

League of Polish Families Liga Polskich Rodzin
- Abbreviation: LPR
- Leader: Witold Bałażak
- Founder: Roman Giertych
- Founded: 30 May 2001; 25 years ago
- Merger of: National Democratic Party; National Party
- Headquarters: ul. Hoża 9, 00-528 Warsaw
- Ideology: Current: Christian conservatism Social conservatism Civic nationalism Familialism; Pro-Europeanism; Historical: National democracy Polish nationalism Anti-capitalism; National conservatism Hard Euroscepticism
- Political position: Right-wing; Historical: Far-right
- Religion: Roman Catholicism
- National affiliation: Civic Coalition
- European affiliation: European Christian Political Party
- Colours: Sky blue
- Anthem: "Rota"
- Sejm: 0 / 460
- Senate: 0 / 100
- European Parliament: 0 / 51

Website
- e-lpr.pl
- Politics of Poland; Political parties; Elections; A: The party is also considered economically left-wing.

The League of Polish Families (Polish: Liga Polskich Rodzin [ˈli.ɡa ˈpɔl.skix ˈrɔ.d͡ʑin], LPR) is a social conservative political party in Poland, with many far-right elements in the past. The party's original ideology was that of the National Democracy movement which was headed by Roman Dmowski, however, in 2006 its leader Roman Giertych distanced himself from that heritage.

It was represented in the Polish parliament, forming part of the cabinet of Jarosław Kaczyński until the latter dissolved in September 2007. In the 2007 parliamentary election, it failed to gain the 5% threshold required to enter the Sejm and lost all its seats, even failing to cross the 3% threshold for eligibility to receive government funding. Since then, the party has become a minor political force, but continues to exist.

The All-Polish Youth used to be affiliated with the party as its youth wing, but these two organisations later severed their relations.

== History ==
The LPR was created just before the elections in 2001 and gained 8% of the vote, giving it 38 out of 460 seats in the Sejm and two seats in the Senate. Its former leader, Roman Giertych, studied Law and History at Adam Mickiewicz University in Poznań. During his career his political alliances have included such Polish National Democrats as Jan Łopuszański, Antoni Macierewicz, Gabriel Janowski.

Roman Giertych reactivated the "All-Polish Youth" (Młodzież Wszechpolska) organisation in 1989, becoming its chairman; he remains honorary chairman. For several years he was a member of the National-Democratic Party (Stronnictwo Narodowo-Demokratyczne) and the National Party (Stronnictwo Narodowe), which merged with several other organisations to form the League of Polish Families (Liga Polskich Rodzin, LPR) in 2001.

Roman Giertych's father, Maciej Giertych, also a member of LPR, is a former member of the European Parliament. His grandfather was a member of parliament of the Second Polish Republic prior to World War II from the National Democracy Party. Some sources claim that the LPR owes much of its success to Radio Maryja, a Catholic radio station with a nationalist, ultra-conservative agenda.

The performance of League of Polish Families in the September 2001 elections, has been partly attributed to its well publicized and uncompromising attitude towards the Jedwabne pogrom. During the election campaign Ryszard Bender, one of the LPR founders and leaders, participated in LPR television broadcasts denying the facts of the Jedwabne pogrom of 1941 and accusing President Aleksander Kwaśniewski, who participated in commemoration ceremony, that took place in the village of Jedwabne in July 2001, of bowing to Jewish interest groups.

Soon after the election in 2001 a group of deputies separated from LPR, creating a new party known now as Polish Agreement led by Jan Łopuszański and Catholic-National Movement (Ruch Katolicko-Narodowy) led by Antoni Macierewicz.

In the 2004 elections to the European Parliament, LPR received 15,2% votes, which gave it 10 out of 54 seats reserved for Poland in the European Parliament. This made the LPR the second-largest party in Poland in that election, second only to the liberal conservative Civic Platform (PO), and well ahead of the then ruling post-communist Democratic Left Alliance, the populist Samoobrona and the conservative Law and Justice (PiS). However, the overall turnout of that election was less than 20% of eligible voters. Thus, the long-term significance of the LPR's strong performance in that election is unclear. In the 2005 elections, LPR again received 8% of votes, but saw its seats reduced from 38 to 34. However, it gained five seats in the Senate, taking it up to seven.

The 2005 election produced no clear winner, producing a political gridlock and a possibility of new elections. The two largest parties, PiS and PO, entered negotiations in order to form a "grand coalition". The PiS-PO coalition was supported by 44% of PiS voters and 78% of PO voters. However, PO broke off negotiations - PO complained that although PiS offered it half of the Polish 16 ministries, none of them included the so-called "power-ministries" (interior, justice and secret services), which led to fears that PiS would abuse its control over the Polish justice system. PO also noted that PiS had been shifting to the left economically, whereas PO was staunchly neoliberal.

Ultimately, PiS settled down for a minority government, composed entirely of PiS members. However, the party began losing popular support in 2006, which eventually forced it to form a "stabilization pact" with League of Polish Families and Samoobrona. All three parties were, to varying degrees, socially conservative and economically left-leaning. For its part, LPR demanded the withdrawal of the Polish army from Iraq, renegotiation of the EU accession treaty, as well as "pro-family" economic policy.

However, the coalition broke down in August 2007 - PiS sought to "neutralize" LPR and Samoobrona, aware of a significant overlap between the voter bases of all parties involved. To this end, PiS arranged a sting operation against the leader of Samoobrona, Andrzej Lepper, in order to expose his supposed bribery. The plot failed, and PiS expelled Samoobrona from the government. LPR also abandoned the coalition, accusing PiS of abandoning what LPR called the “national-socialist program” that all three parties agreed to in the stabilization pact.

Samoobrona and LPR then joined forces to form a single formation, the League and Self-Defense (LiS). Initially, LiS was seen positively by the press and the electorate - political scientist Andrzej Rychard argued that it had a chance to become "a better PiS", outflank on left-wing economic appeal, and attract voters nostalgic towards communism. In the summer of 2007, LiS was polling as much as 23%. However, the formation rapidly declined in polls as Samoobrona and LPR clashed with each other, which led to dissolution of LiS in September 2007.

Ultimately, Samoobrona and LPR ran separately. In the 2007 Parliamentary election, both parties failed to gain the 5% of votes required to enter the Sejm and lost all its seats, in addition to failing meeting the 3% of votes requirement for eligibility to receive government funding. The leader of LPR, Roman Giertych, stepped down from his post as the party's leader, while Lepper died in 2011. The left-wing populist appeal of Samoobrona was taken and consolidated by PiS. Likewise, PiS "neutralized" LPR by appropriating its Catholic nationalist rhetoric and sociocultural stances.

Some present or former members of LPR (including Janusz Dobrosz) and five of its MEPs moved to Forward Poland in 2008/9.

In the 2010s, the party became more moderate and changed its attitude towards the European Union. In parliamentary and presidential elections, it usually supports the candidates of the Civic Platform or the Polish People's Party. In 2019, LPR declared its accession to the European Coalition. Roman Giertych is an active politician in the ruling coalition, and has stated successfully ran for the Sejm in the 2023 Polish parliamentary election as part of the Civic Coalition.

== Ideology ==
Political alignment of post-1989 Polish political parties on a two-dimensional spectrum. League of Polish Families is coded as LPR.

The party was described as belonging to the populist current in European politics, that juxtaposes the 'simple man' and the 'corrupt elite'.

The Journal of Communist Studies and Transition Politics described the party as clerical-nationalist, the party's agenda combining conservative social values, Christian solidarity and nationalism. Adam Michnik has characterized the groups that formed the party as the heirs of the chauvinist, xenophobic and antisemitic organizations of the pre-war Poland. In 2023, the party was described as "Christian Democrat, manifesting their conservatism and attachment to Christian values".

The party takes economically anti-capitalist stances, campaigning on re-nationalization of the Polish economy, promoting welfare programs, and strongly opposing cuts in social spending and taxation. Its economic stances are based on the party's own interpretation of the Catholic social teaching. containing many populist as well as socialist policies and proposals.

=== Economic issues ===
Economically, the party takes an interventionist and anti-capitalist stance. It is strongly critical of Balcerowicz Plan, the neoliberal economic reforms that transitioned Polish economy to free-market capitalism in the 1990s. LPR argues that it enrichened very few, creating oligarchs in Poland who formed local "capital empires", called "children of Balcerowicz" by the party. The party contrasts them with the 'victims of Balcerowicz', such as the farmers, unemployed, poor and disadvantaged, who were "robbed by Balcerowicz financial politics". The party supports economic interventionism and nationalization of the economy - it is strongly opposed to privatization and cuts in social welfare, and calls for expelling foreign firms and capital from the Polish economy. LPR called for nationalization of several economic sectors such as the banking, energy, oil, mining, telecommunication and transport industries. It denounced privatization, especially of sectors such as insurance and healthcare, denouncing such proposals as social Darwinism and "Neo-Malthusianism".

According to political scientists Tomasz Zarycki and George Kolankiewicz, LPR holds "objectively left-wing views on issues such as privatisation, state intervention in the economy and redistribution of wealth", combined with "strong opposition to Polish EU membership and, more generally, a nationalist and anti-cosmopolitan worldview." Similarly, Oliver Kossack argued that LPR is "clearly positioned on the left end of the socio-economic spectrum". Some also called LPR the "national left", which was also a classification applied to Samoobrona.

The party supports for the "defense of Polish property" through nationalization of most Polish industries, development of domestic agriculture via state intervention and protectionist measures, as well as creating a economy that would prioritize care for Polish families and the homeless. It claims to be a voice of the disadvantaged groups that became the "losers" of socioeconomic changes in Poland, caused by globalization, privatization and austerity. LPR rejects capitalism as a system that causes the "McDonaldization of the planet"; it also condemns neoliberalism and the tradition of economic liberalism in general as "lumpenliberalism" that is characterized by consumptionism and hedonism rather than serving the needs of the poor and disadvantaged. It postulates the creation of an extensive system of welfare and social protection. Political scientist Tim Bale described LPR as an overtly anti-capitalist party, and Ashley Timidaiski considers the economic ideology of the LPR to be a combination of populism and socialism.

LPR argues that after 1989, Polish economy should have remained state-owned, and made to serve the interests of the Polish nation. The party considers the privatization of crucial industries such as the energy, mining, road and railway industries particularly detrimental to the interests of Polish people. It accused the cabinets that carried out privatization to have sold the Polish economy to foreign capital for personal gain and causing widespread poverty and misery. It also harshly attacked privatization of the armaments industry, concluding that the Polish transition of capitalism was "economic colonialism". It decried privatization as "pathological" and undemocratic, arguing that any kind of privatization should have been voted on in the Sejm. The solution proposed by the party was renationalization of the Polish economy and a creation of investigative committees that would persecute and criminalize "unfair" and "treasonous" cases of privatization and deregulation.

In addition to its support of a state-owned industry, the party also envisioned an extensive spending program that would greatly increase spending on education and healthcare, as well as provide generous subsidies to core industrise as well as research in order to spur innovation. LPR believes that Poland should be self-sufficient in regards to energy and food, and prioritize the development of Polish agriculture. The agricultural proposals of the party include a referendum on banning foreign ownership of arable land in Poland, land reform that would break up large farms in favor of "family farms", as well as a program that would guarantee full employment to the impoverished rural regions. LPR also postulated environmental improvements and development of biofuels in order to guarantee "ecologically high" quality of Polish agricultural products. The party consistently supported farmer protests, and spoke against suppressing them through police intervention.

The party is also highly protectionist, listing protection of Polish economy from foreign capital and competition as one of its main goals. According to LPR, Polish economic regulations favor foreign capital and suppress local industries; the party proposes to reverse the situation by heavily limiting the presence and possibilities of foreign capital in Poland, and introducing a package of reforms that would favor Polish producers over foreign ones. Foreign corporations in Poland are to be obliged to invest at least 50% of their profit from Poland to local economies. The party also attacked what it perceived to be a monopolizaton of the Polish economy, described as an emergence of large corporations and chain stores; LPR particularly called for regulation and extensive taxation of "hypermarkets" and supermarkets, and blamed them for the decline of family stores.

=== Social issues ===
Some of the policies the LPR opposes include: the selling of land to foreigners (especially German expellees), abolishing the draft, legalization of "soft drugs", legalization of abortion, euthanasia, and gay marriage. It supports capital punishment, maintaining universal health care and public education, and supports the withdrawal of Polish troops from Iraq. The LPR also supports the publication of the complete archives of the Polish communist secret police—in other words, full "de-Communization".

The party particularly appealed to voters sympathetic towards traditional social values, the Catholic faith, and the concept of Polish national sovereignty. Its policies also attract some who feel lost in the post-1989 political transformation of the country, although the populist Andrzej Lepper's Samoobrona ("Self Defense"), also speaking out for the 'simple man', menaced by the post 1989 changes thus, appeal more directly to so-called marginalized voters. The press close to the party has published antisemitic articles; some of the Polish politicians like Adam Michnik have been characterized as pink hyenas representing non-Polish interests, assisted by Mossad and "godless, satanical masons propagating nihilism and demoralisation." Those "dark forces" are said to be fiercely opposed to a Catholic state of the Polish nation.

The party was considered staunchly homophobic, and its opposition to same-sex marriage and several other demands of Polish gays and lesbians has led to condemnation of the party by the European Commission. It was also labelled as antisemitic by some authors.

In the 2010s, LPR ceased to arouse controversy and began gradually moving to the centre. The party is no longer xenophobic and Eurosceptic. Its views on religion have also become more moderate.

=== Stance towards the European Union ===
The party was anti-EU. The Economist reported in 2002 that the LPR spreads the word that the EU is a communist conspiracy. Although it was the only significant political force in Poland that unconditionally opposed Polish membership in the European Union (believing that a union controlled by social liberals could never be reformed), after Polish accession to the EU the party participated in European Parliament elections, in order to have actual influence over decisions made regarding Poland. During the 2004 controversy surrounding Rocco Buttiglione (the conservative Italian nominee as European Commissioner for "Justice, Freedom, and Security"), the LPR deputies demanded the dissolution of the parliament, feeling that it was too much under the influence of a homosexual lobby.. In 2004, 31 MEPs from the UK, Poland, Denmark and Sweden formed the new Independence/Democracy, formerly the group for Europe of Democracies and Diversities. The main goals of this group were the rejection of any European Constitution and opposition to any plans for a federal Europe. Currently, LPR is pro-European and considers membership in the European Union as the will of the Polish nation. Although it retains its nationalistic ideology, it mainly supports the EU.

== Election results ==
=== Sejm ===
Election	Votes	%	Seats	+/–	Government
2001	1,025,148	7.9 (#6)	38 / 460	New	SLD-UP-PSL (2001-2003)
2001	1,025,148	7.9 (#6)	38 / 460	New	SLD-UP Minority (2003-2004)
2001	1,025,148	7.9 (#6)	38 / 460	New	SLD-UP-SDPL Minority (2004-2005)
2005	940,762	8.0 (#5)	34 / 460	▼4	PiS Minority (2005)
2005	940,762	8.0 (#5)	34 / 460	▼4	PiS–SRP–LPR (2006-2007)
2005	940,762	8.0 (#5)	34 / 460	▼4	PiS Minority (2007)
2007	209,171	1.3 (#6)	0 / 460	▼34	PO–PSL

=== Senate ===
Election	Seats	+/–
2001	2 / 100	New
2005	7 / 100	▲5
2007	0 / 100	▼7

=== European Parliament ===
Election	Votes	%	Seats	+/–
2004	969,689	15.9 (#2)	10 / 54	New
2009	83,754	1.1 (#8)	0 / 50	▼10
2009	Running as part of Libertas Poland.			

=== Regional assemblies ===
Election	Votes	%	Seats	+/–
2002	1,603,081	14.4 (#4)	92 / 561	New
2006	568,935	4.7 (#6)	11 / 561	▼81
2010	87,545	0.7 (#13)	0 / 561	▼11
2014	34,054	0.3 (#19)	0 / 555	Steady

== Literature ==
- The League of Polish Families between East and West, past and present by Sarah L. de Lange and Simona Guerrab. In: Communist and Post-Communist Studies. Volume 42, Issue 4, December 2009, pp. 527–549

== See also ==
- List of League of Polish Families politicians
- Radio Maryja
- League and Self-Defense
- League of the Right of the Republic
- National Movement
