= Karol Nawrocki =

President of Poland since 2025

His Excellency Karol Nawrocki
- Nawrocki in 2026

President of Poland
- Incumbent
- Assumed office 6 August 2025
- Prime Minister: Donald Tusk
- Preceded by: Andrzej Duda

President of the Institute of National Remembrance
- In office 23 July 2021 – 6 August 2025
- Preceded by: Jarosław Szarek
- Succeeded by: TBD

Director of the Museum of the Second World War
- In office 19 October 2017 – 23 July 2021
- Preceded by: Paweł Machcewicz
- Succeeded by: Grzegorz Berendt

Personal details
- Born: 3 March 1983 (age 43) Gdańsk, Poland
- Party: Independent
- Other political affiliations: Law and Justice (2025)
- Spouse: Marta Smoleń (m. 2010)
- Children: 3
- Education: University of Gdańsk (PhD); Gdańsk University of Technology (MBA)
- Occupation: Politician; historian
- Awards: Order of White Eagle Order of Polonia Restituta Silver Cross of Merit (Poland) Bronze Cross of Merit (Poland) Pro Patria Medal (Poland) Bene Merito honorary badge

Academic background
- Thesis: Social Resistance to Communist Rule in the Elbląg Voivodeship, 1976–1989 (2013)
- Academic advisor: Grzegorz Berendt

Academic work
- Discipline: History
- School or tradition: Policy of memory
- Institutions: Institute of National Remembrance (2009–2017); Museum of the Second World War (2017–2021)
- Main interests: Anti-communist resistance in Poland; Organised crime; sports history

Karol Tadeusz Nawrocki (Note: Polish: [ˈkarɔl naˈvrɔt͡skʲi]) (born 3 March 1983) is a Polish historian and politician who has served as the president of Poland since 2025. He served as the director of the Institute of National Remembrance (IPN) from 2021 to 2025, and was the director of the Museum of the Second World War in Gdańsk from 2017 to 2021.

Born in Gdańsk, Nawrocki studied history at the University of Gdańsk, earning a PhD in 2013 with a dissertation on anti-communist activities in the former Polish People's Republic. His academic work centres on themes such as anti-communist resistance in Poland, organised crime, and the history of sports, a subject related to his own background as an active youth athlete, particularly in football and boxing. Nawrocki's early professional career was closely aligned with institutions dedicated to preserving and promoting Poland's historical memory. He joined the Institute of National Remembrance (IPN) in 2009 and gained recognition for reorienting Poland's historical institutions toward a patriotic and anti-communist narrative. In the 2025 Polish presidential election, Nawrocki was chosen as the presidential candidate of the right-wing populist Law and Justice (PiS) party, ran as a nonpartisan "citizens' candidate" and defeated the liberal Rafał Trzaskowski.

As president, Nawrocki has reflected a broader anti-liberal realignment in Poland's political landscape, aligning with populist and right-wing cultural shifts. (Note: Prawica (lit. "right wing") in Polish politics refers to those parties that sit on the right side of the national legislature (Sejm), reflecting mostly those parties with patriotic, communitarian, and pro-religious values, and since the 2010s also populism, although typically not right-wing nor liberal economics (aside from the smaller Confederation coalition).) However, he holds a pro-welfare and protectionist economic stance described by some as left-wing. He pledged to implement new policies that will combat "unfair competition" in the Polish economy. Since his inauguration on 6 August 2025, Nawrocki has been following a confrontational course with the 15 October Coalition and professed opposition to its leader, Donald Tusk. Nawrocki strives to strengthen power around the presidency, supporting constitutional reform into a semi-presidential system. His chancellery is made up of PiS politicians and his IPN affiliates.

== Early life and education ==
Karol Nawrocki was born on 3 March 1983 in Gdańsk. His father, Ryszard (1949–2008), was a turner and a member of Solidarity. His mother, Elżbieta, was a bookbinder. He has a younger sister named Nina who is a pastry cook and works in a restaurant in Kraków. He completed primary school and the 4th High School in his home city. After passing his final exams (matura) in 2002, he graduated in 2003 from the Post-Secondary School of Business and Administration in Gdańsk with the title of Personnel Management Specialist. In the same year, he began his university studies at Faculty of History at the University of Gdańsk, which he completed in 2008 with a master's degree.

At the same institute, he obtained a PhD in the humanities based on his dissertation titled: Social Resistance to Communist Rule in the Elbląg Voivodeship, 1976–1989. In 2023, he completed the International MBA in Strategy, Programme and Project Management postgraduate studies at the Gdańsk University of Technology. In his youth, Nawrocki developed a strong interest in physical fitness, spending time working out at the gym, and participating in football and boxing.

== Early career ==
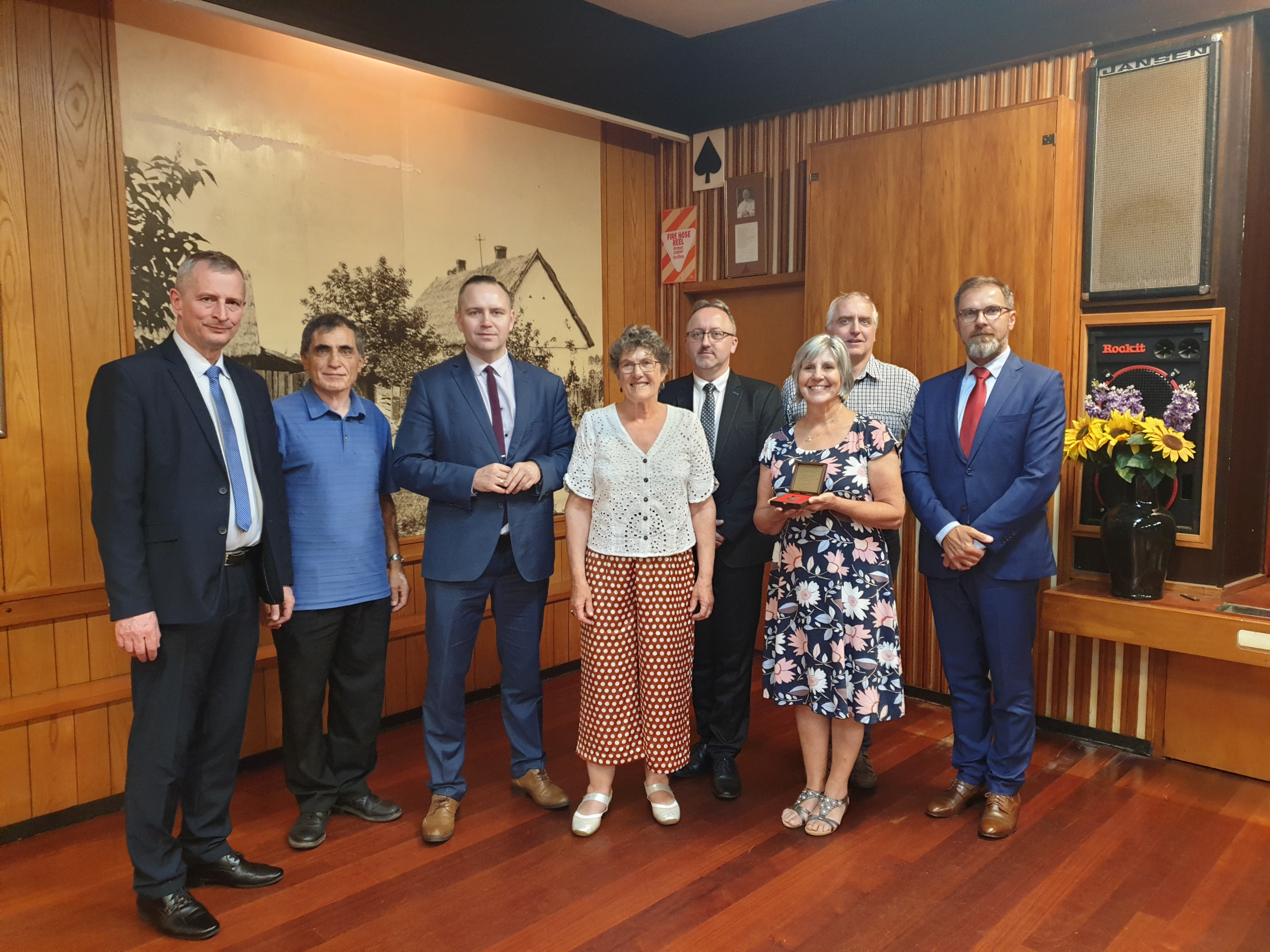
Nawrocki as the director of the Museum of the Second World War during a meeting with Polish diaspora in New Zealand, February 2020

Nawrocki worked at the Institute of National Remembrance in the years 2009–2017, heading its Branch Public Education Office in Gdańsk from 2013 to 2017. He also served as the chairman of the Siedlce District Council in Gdańsk between 2011 and 2017.

In 2017, Nawrocki was appointed the director of the Museum of the Second World War in Gdańsk, a job he held until 2021. He then returned to the Institute of National Remembrance, becoming its deputy president in June 2021. In July 2021, he took office as the head of the Institute of National Remembrance after being elected by the Sejm and approved by the Senate of Poland. Nawrocki is the author or co-author of several books as well as numerous scientific and popular science papers on anti-communist opposition, organised crime in the Polish People's Republic and the history of sports.

Nawrocki used the pen name "Tadeusz Batyr" to write a book about a gangster living in 1980s Communist Poland. Nawrocki in 2018 went on television as Tadeusz Batyr, wearing a hat and having the television broadcast blur his face, where he said that Nawrocki "inspired me" and highlighted how Nawrocki "was the first person to examine organised crime in communist Poland". Meanwhile, on social media, Nawrocki wrote that "Tadeusz Batyr contacted me for some guidance" and "thanked me for my help with an interesting book, which I recommend".

== Presidential campaign ==
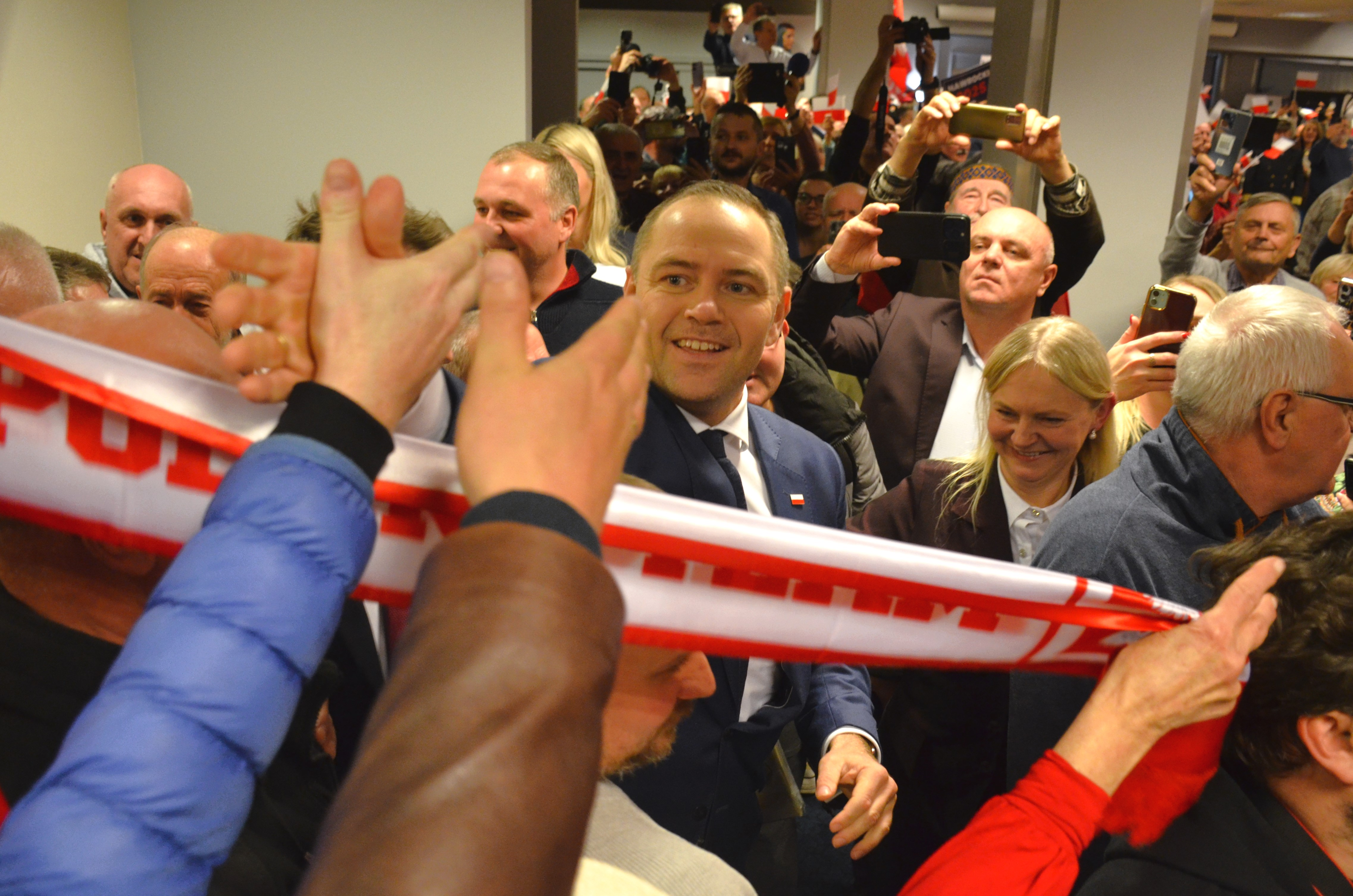
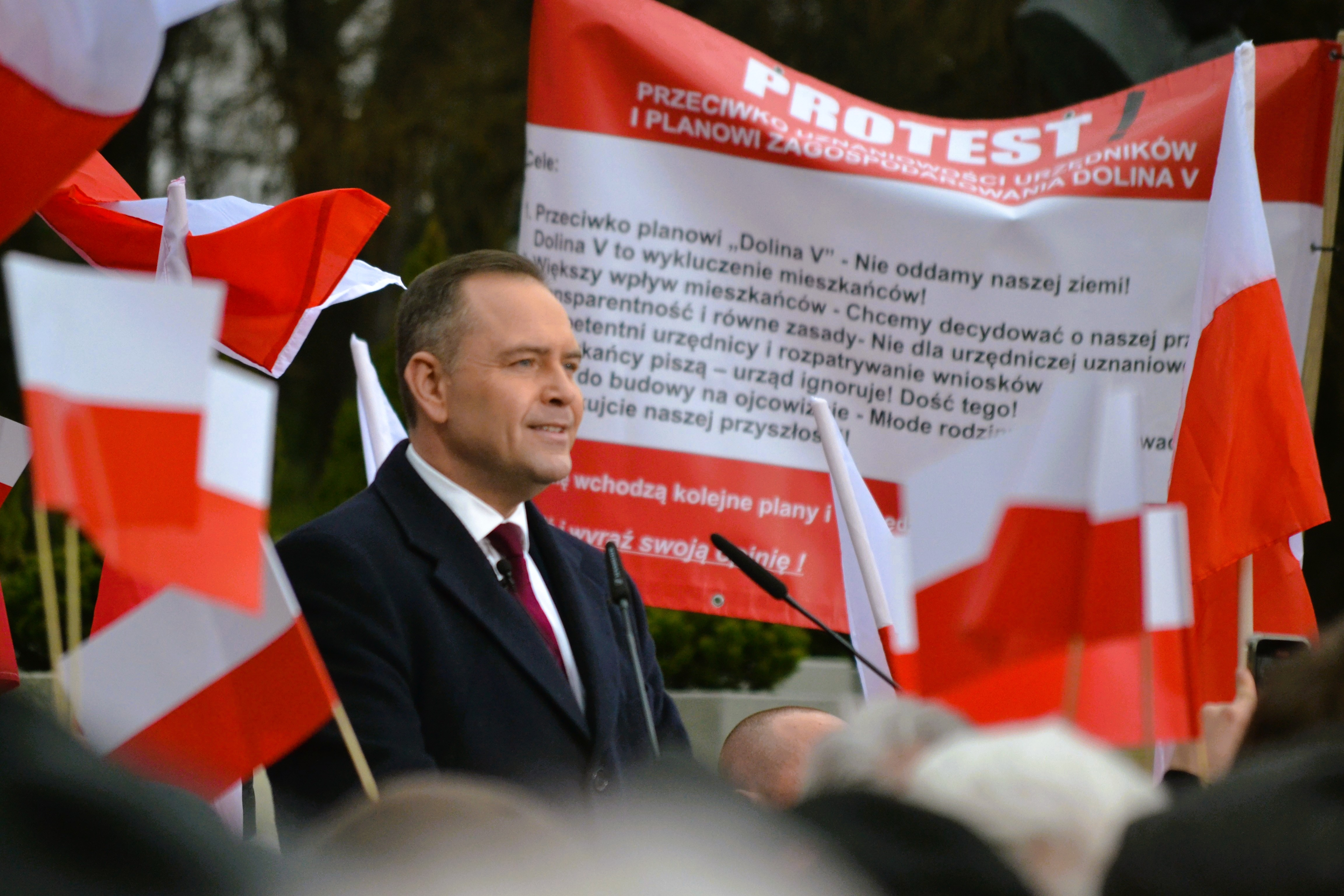
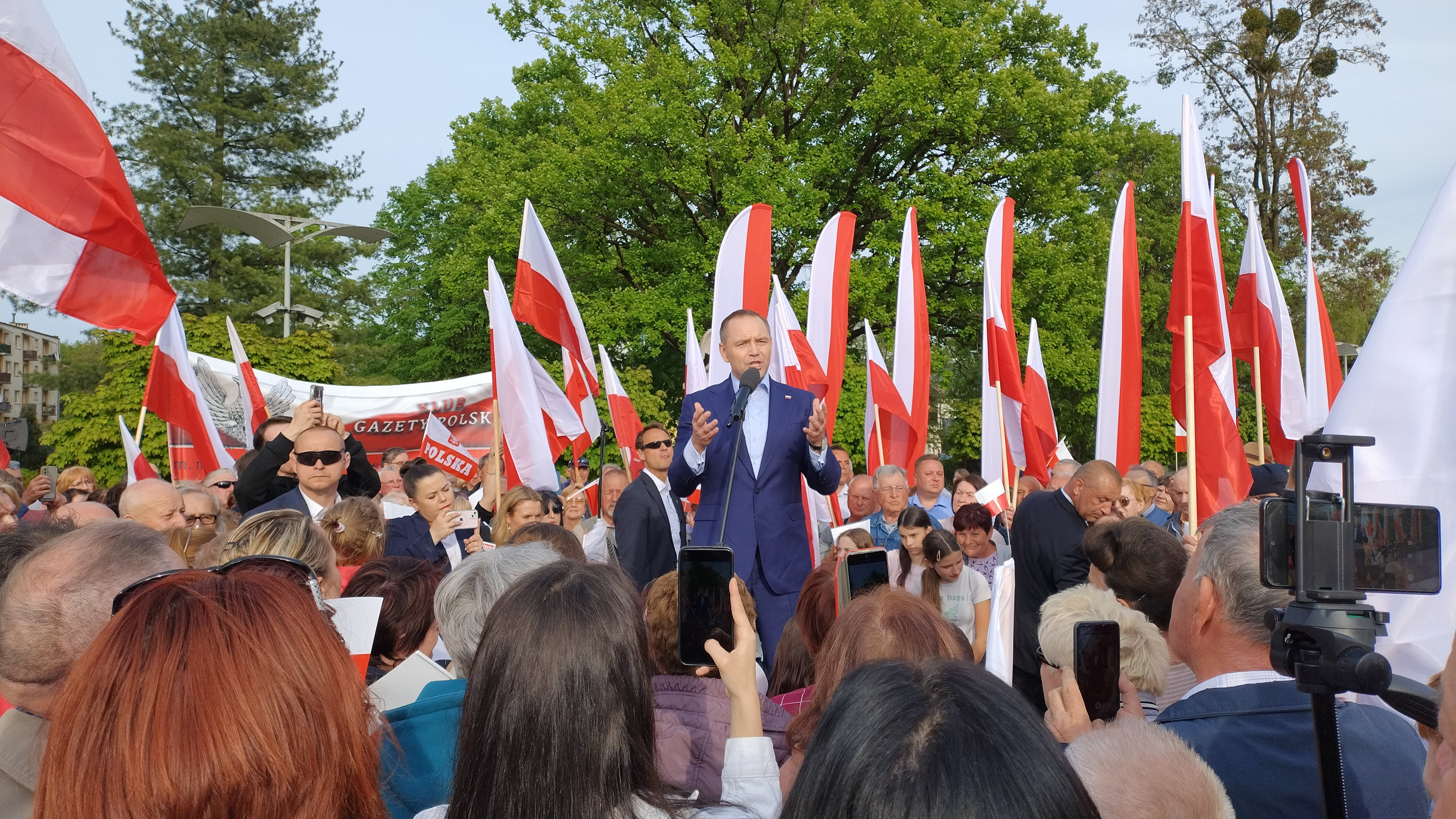
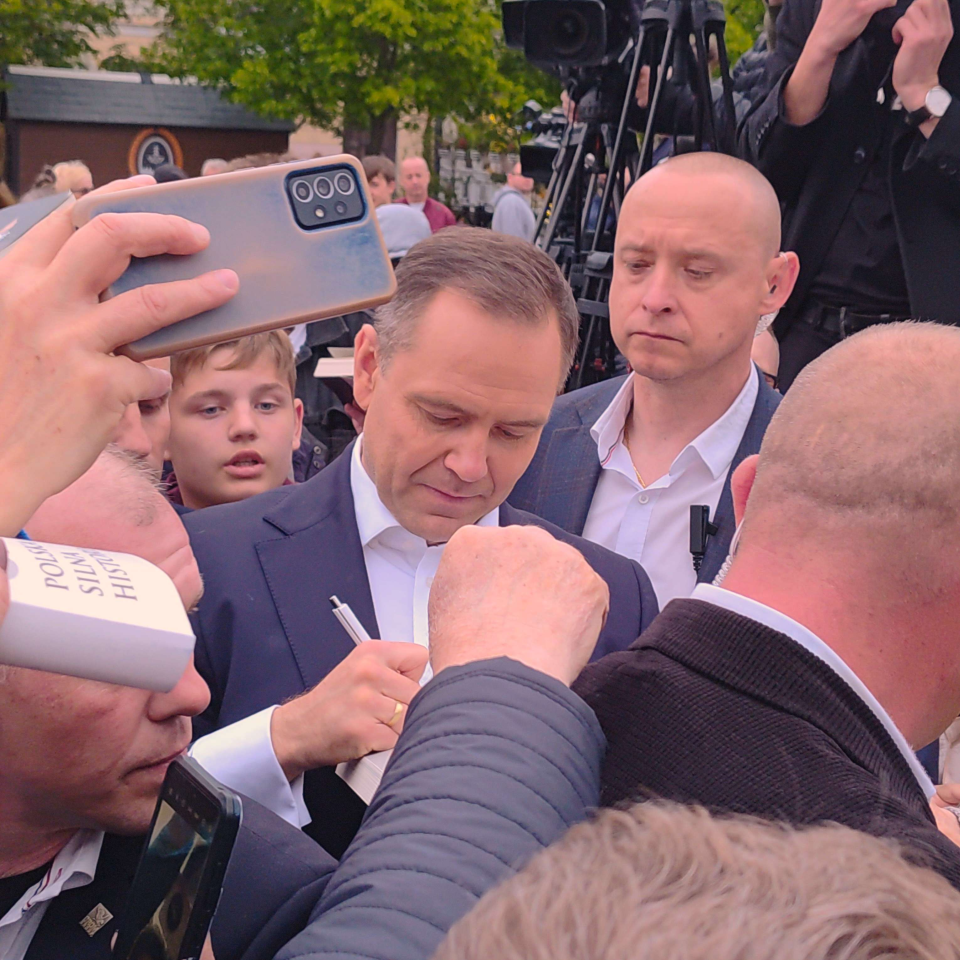
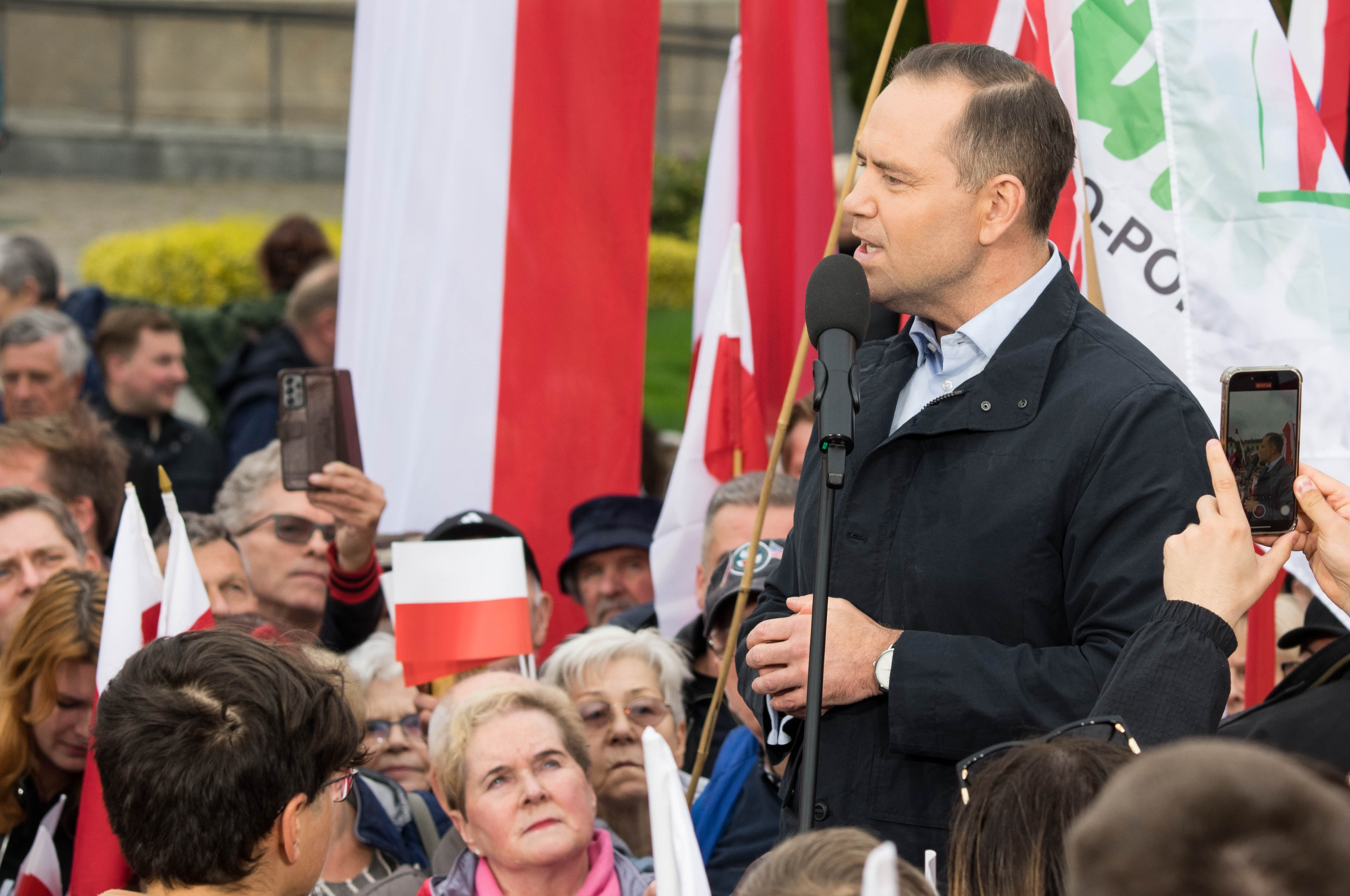
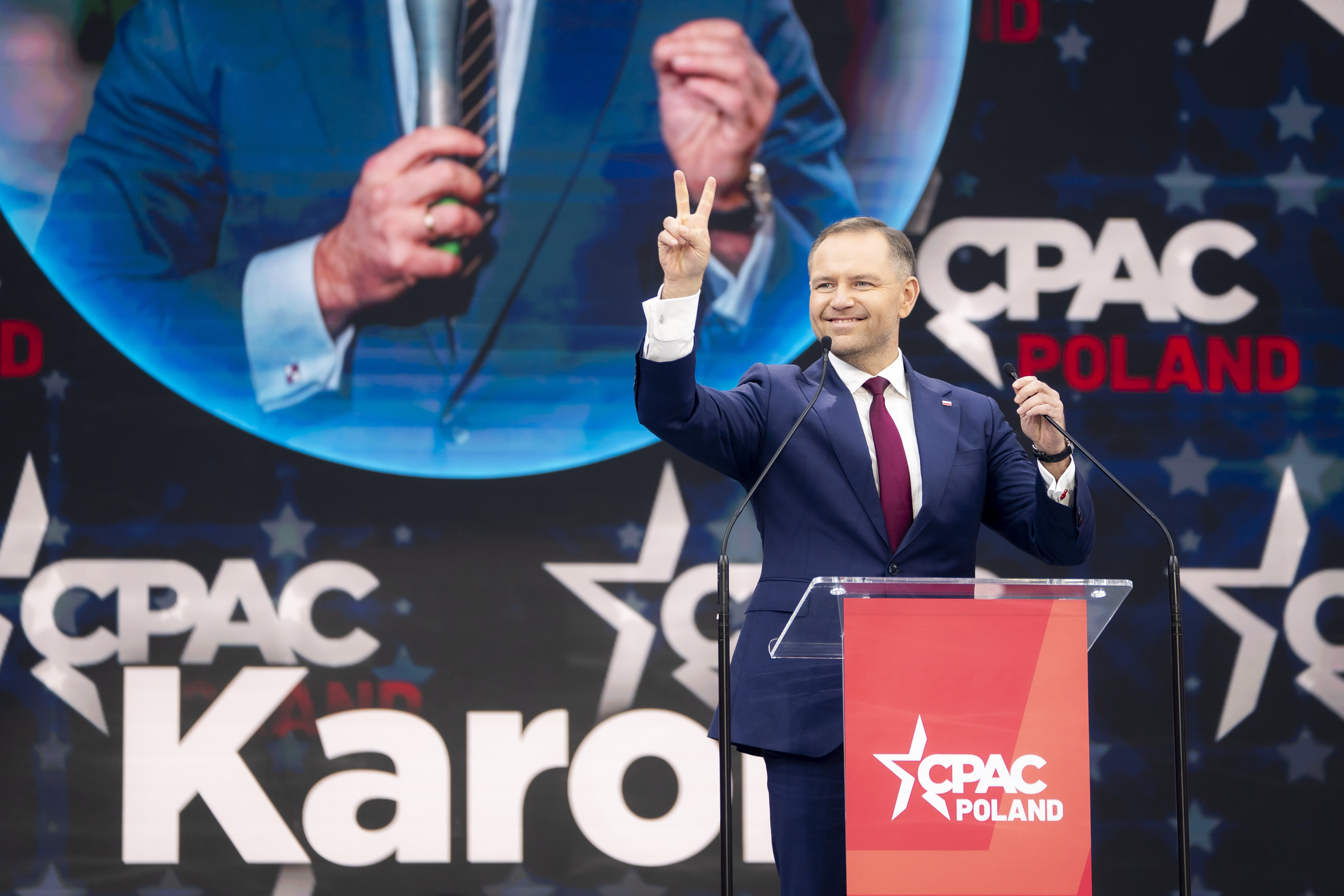
Nawrocki at campaign events, left to right and top to bottom: Bielsko-Biała on 2 December 2024, Sanok on 30 March 2025, Nowa Dęba on 29 April, Płock on 7 May, Bydgoszcz on 19 May, CPAC event on 27 May

=== Rise to candidacy ===
Nawrocki was in consideration among speculative candidates such as PiS parliamentary leader Mariusz Błaszczak, MEP Tobiasz Bocheński, poseł Zbigniew Bogucki, former Minister Przemysław Czarnek, MEP Patryk Jaki, former Prime Minister Mateusz Morawiecki, poseł Arkadiusz Mularczyk, poseł Kacper Płażyński, former Deputy Minister Tomasz Szatkowski and MEP Dominik Tarczyński, among others. President of the World Anti-Doping Agency, Witold Bańka, was also considered Kaczyński's favoured candidate, but he refused to run in the election.

Because of the centralised nature of the party, the choice for selecting who the party's candidate would be fell primarily to the party chairman, Jarosław Kaczyński, based on social research and the balance of factional power within the party. In an August Radio Maryja interview, Kaczyński stated that the selection of possible candidates was narrowing, and described that the PiS candidate must be a "young, tall, imposing, handsome" male "[with] a family". A United Surveys poll in September 2024 suggested 29% of PiS voters supported Błaszczak, 21% supported Morawiecki, 11% supported Czarnek, 7% supported Nawrocki, 6% supported Bocheński and 6% supported Tarczyński. The possibility of a primary election for the party was rumored, but ultimately, never announced.

By November 2024, media speculation regarding the candidates narrowed down to, most frequently, Bocheński, Czarnek and Nawrocki. According to Newsweek Polska, Nawrocki was supported internally by party activists such as Adam Bielan, Joachim Brudziński, Sławomir Cenckiewicz, Marta Kaczyńska, and Mateusz Morawiecki (despite initially desiring to be the candidate himself). Ultimately, at 13.15 on 22 November, Nawrocki was informed that he had been selected as the party's presidential candidate in a meeting with Kaczyński and his opponent, Bocheński.

Speculation began on whether PiS would replace Nawrocki when it was revealed that he had contact with a future criminal during his time as a boxer two decades prior, for which he was attacked by opposing politicians. Polling showed that the vast plurality of people did not expect Nawrocki to be replaced. Nawrocki continued being PiS' presidential candidate going into the first round.

The selection of Nawrocki without consultation with outgoing president Andrzej Duda (the previous PiS candidate) strained relations between him and Nawrocki, although Duda eventually endorsed Nawrocki at his election convention in Łódź on 26 April.

=== First round of the presidential election ===
Days before the first round, Nawrocki and Romanian presidential candidate George Simion campaigned together in the city of Zabrze, with Nawrocki praising Simion as the "future president of Romania". Donald Tusk criticised cooperation between the two, stating that “Russia rejoices” at such political ties. Critics say this refers to nationalist Călin Georgescu whose victory in the 2024 Romanian presidential election got cancelled citing Russian interference.

On 24 November 2024, at the Sokół Gymnastics Society Building, during a civic congress organised by Law and Justice, Nawrocki was announced by Andrzej Nowak as an independent candidate supported by the party in the 2025 presidential election. Nawrocki's campaign's platform was described as "patriotic, pro-Christian, pro-NATO, pro-Western, and pro-Donald Trump". On 1 May 2025, Nawrocki met with Donald Trump in the Oval Office. He finished second in the first round held on 18 May 2025 with 29.54% of the vote, and faced Civic Platform candidate Rafał Trzaskowski in a runoff on 1 June.

During the course of the campaign, public criticism emerged over Nawrocki's acquisition of a second apartment from an elderly man in pre-trial detention. As Nawrocki had declared to own just one apartment during a debate, Onet.pl publicised information about him owning a second one. The candidate proceeded to declare that he had acquired the second apartment from the elderly man for pledging lifelong care in exchange; it was revealed the man was placed in a state care facility without Nawrocki's involvement. Amid accusations of exploitation, Nawrocki defended the deal's legality and donated the property to charity, after which some journalists said the man regained access to the property. He also stated he had regularly tried to visit the elderly man, but without success.

=== Second round of the presidential election ===
On 22 May 2025, Nawrocki met with Sławomir Mentzen, who placed third in the first round of the election. They reportedly discussed possible concessions that could lead to Mentzen endorsing Nawrocki. Mentzen presented a set of eight points (Note: The declaration included commitments to not allow for: the introduction of new taxes or increasing existing ones; introduction of the Euro in Poland; the restricting of freedom of speech, abiding by the constitution; sending soldiers to Ukrainian territory; allowing Ukrainian accession to NATO; the restricting of access to arms for private citizens; transfer of additional powers to European Union institutions; signing of European Union treaties that would weaken Poland) for a candidate to sign onto, which were signed by Nawrocki. Former candidates Marek Jakubiak, Marek Woch, Grzegorz Braun and Artur Bartoszewicz endorsed Nawrocki in the runoff. On 1 June 2025, Nawrocki won the runoff election with 50.9% of votes, beating Trzaskowski, who received 49.1% of votes.

Throughout the second round, Nawrocki encountered a set of new incidents involving his personal life, beginning with the revelation that he had previously participated in a 70 vs 70 football hooligans' fight (Polish: ustawka) between fans of Lechia Gdańsk and Lech Poznań. Facing criticism, he said that Prime Minister Tusk likewise participated in football hooliganism in his youth, and called the fights "noble battles". It also came to light that Nawrocki had Chelsea and Lechia Gdańsk tattoos on his torso. There were allegations of him having worked as a bodyguard for sex workers at the five-star Grand Hotel in Sopot in his youth and using a nicotine pouch while on air during a presidential debate, which raised concerns about a possible nicotine addiction.

== President of Poland (2025–present) ==
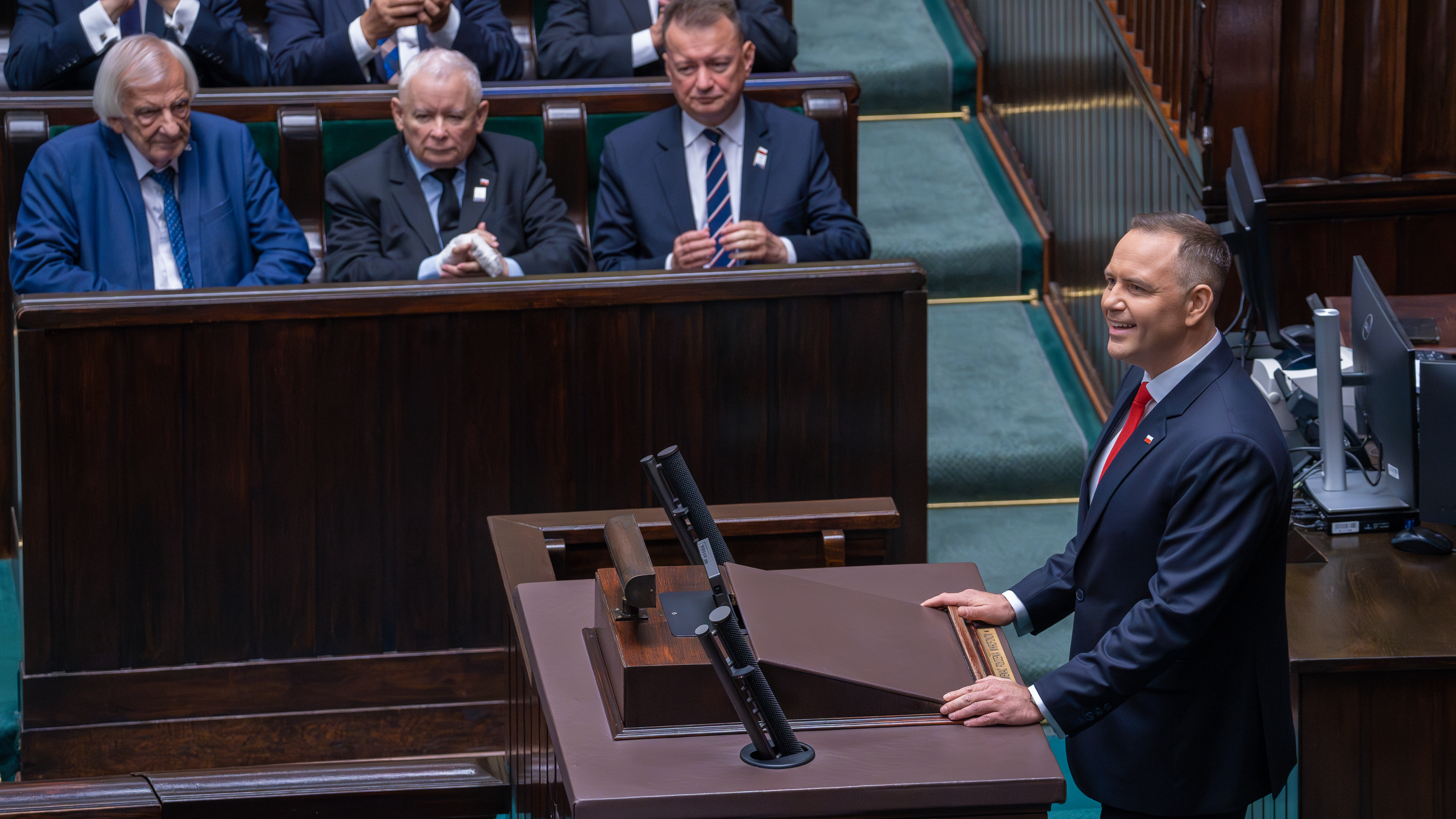
Karol Nawrocki giving a speech at his inauguration on 6 August 2025

Nawrocki was inaugurated as president of Poland on 6 August 2025, succeeding Andrzej Duda. On the same day, he participated in the ceremony of accepting the authority of the President of Poland on the Polish Armed Forces.

=== Domestic policy ===
==== Relations with the Prime Minister and government ====
Nawrocki's presidency was marked by a confrontational stance against Prime Minister Donald Tusk and his ruling coalition, citing his large and recent social mandate after the recent presidential election. Nawrocki views Tusk as the worst Prime Minister of the Third Polish Republic, but expresses willingness to work with him regardless. Analysts consider the downfall of Tusk's coalition and early parliamentary elections as a goal for Nawrocki, with him also seen as competing with Tusk's government in matters of lawmaking and governance despite the president having a primarily representative role, announcing he is seeking a "new formula of cooperation" between the President and parliament. Nawrocki held his first meeting with Tusk on 14 August, and on 27 August convened the first Cabinet Council, oriented on finances, investments and agriculture.

==== Partisan affiliations ====
Karol Nawrocki was elected primarily with the support of the Law and Justice (PiS) party and, despite being officially independent, was considered the PiS candidate in the 2025 presidential election. However, Nawrocki's affiliation as a "PiS president" is debated, with some suggesting he could be a more independent president, or could cooperate with the far-right Confederation as well, despite its libertarian economic policies conflicting with PiS. Alongside seeking to empower his role in governance of the country and reform Poland into a semi-presidential republic, Nawrocki is perceived as aspiring to lead the "right wing" of politics, possibly threatening the position of established political leaders such as Jarosław Kaczyński of the economically interventionist Law and Justice party.

==== Constitutional reform ====
At his inaugural speech, Nawrocki announced his intention to create a new Constitution by 2030, announcing the creation of a Council for the Reform of the System of the State (Polish: Rada ds. Naprawy Ustroju Państwa). Soon after, Paweł Szefernaker, Nawrocki's appointed cabinet chief, elaborated that Nawrocki aims to empower the presidency. According to RMF FM, the Council is to be chaired by presidential advisor Dariusz Dudek, and seek to reform, among others, the form of government from the current parliamentary-cabinet system to a semi-presidential system. In November 2025, Nawrocki stated that if the government continued what he described as the "process of destabilisation of Poland" by non-recognition of judicial authorities, he would work to initiate a constitutional referendum in the subsequent year.

On 3 May 2026, Nawrocki created a new Council for a New Constitution (Polish: Rada Nowej Konstytucji). Members of the council as of founding were: Julia Przyłębska, Ryszard Piotrowski, Barbara Piwnik, Józef Zych, Marek Jurek, Ryszard Legutko, Anna Łabno, Piotr Andrzejewski, Zdzisław Krasnodębski and Jacek Majchrowski.

==== Legislative initiatives and vetoes ====
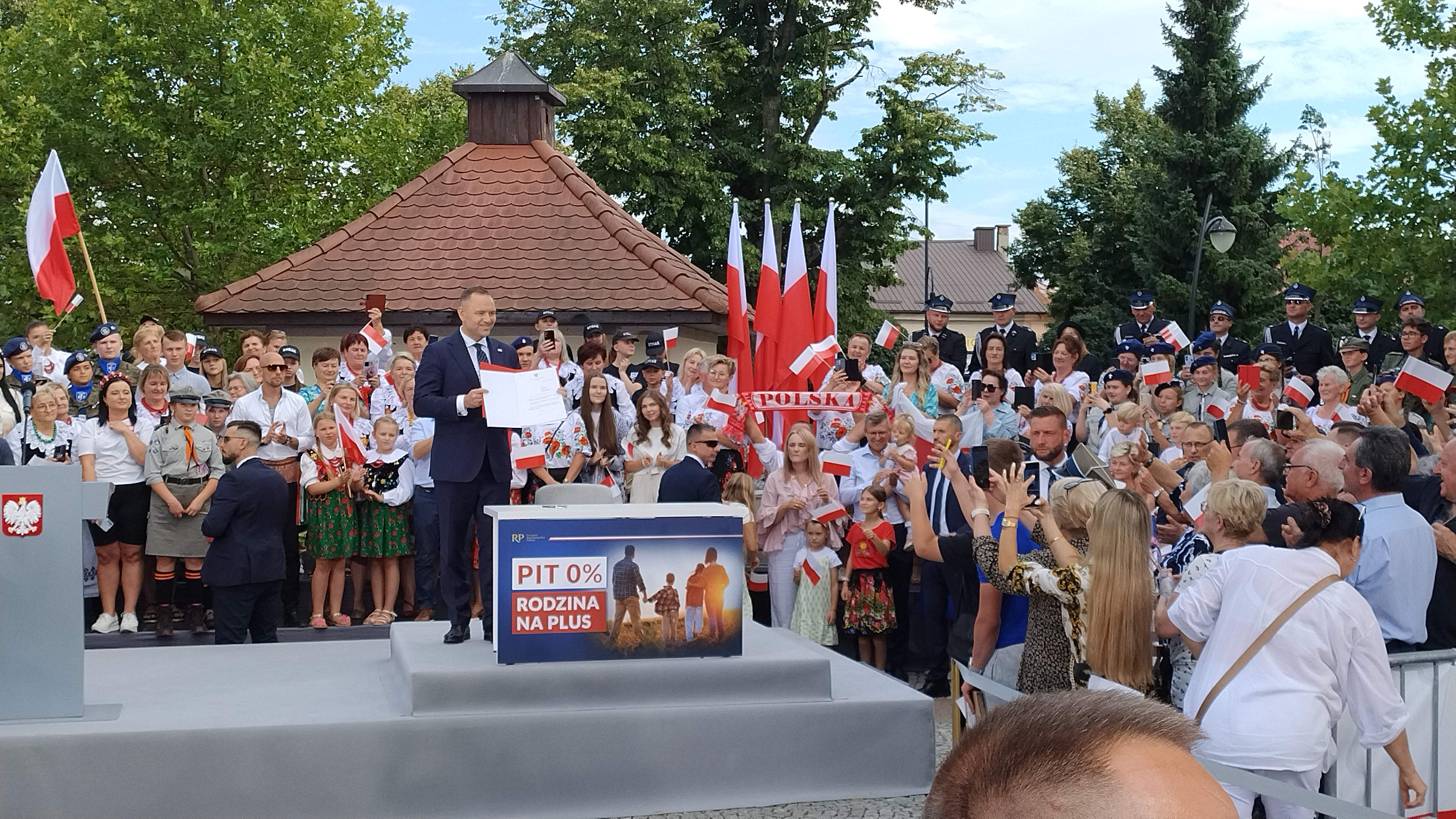
Nawrocki signing the 0% PIT for families bill on 8 August 2025

Part of Nawrocki's conflict strategy against the Tusk cabinet is to use his privilege as president to introduce laws to parliament and to reshape coalition legislation by vetoing laws and re-submitting them with the disputed provisions removed. In the first weeks of Nawrocki's presidency, Nawrocki introduced legislation that would restore the old project of the Central Communication Port, abolish personal income tax for families with more than one child, increase the income tax threshold to an annual income of 140,000 PLN, extend the prohibition of sale of Polish land to foreigners. On 21 August, Nawrocki for the first time used the presidential veto against an omnibus bill regarding wind turbine deregulation and the extension of energy price freeze period, criticising the deregulation as pushed by a wind turbine lobby and unsafe, stating he would propose his own price freeze bill.

On 3 November 2025, Nawrocki introduced a proposed bill titled "Retiring with Dignity", which would raise the minimum wage to 2,000 PLN (up from 1,878 PLN), and introduce the indexation of social pensions both as a percentage and by a fixed amount, with a guaranteed increase of at least 150 PLN for the lowest pensions. Dual pension indexation was one of Tusk's 100 pledges in the 2023 election.

===== Veto counteraction =====
Nawrocki has become the target of criticism from politicians of the governing 15 October Coalition and some commentators because of his record-breaking use of the presidential veto. During the first 11 months of his presidency (from August 2025 to July 2026), Nawrocki vetoed 41 bills, the highest number in the history of the Third Polish Republic.

Government circles have accused the president of blocking legislations in order to deliberately obstruct the government and pursue the political objectives of the opposition. Karol Nawrocki and officials from his presidential chancellery have rejected these accusations, arguing that the vetoes are not intended as a political weapon but rather a genuine effort to prevent the enactment of poorly drafted legislation, defend the constitutional order, and protect citizens' rights.

Because of the record number of vetoed bills, politicians from the Civic Coalition and media outlets supportive of the government began referring to Nawrocki as the “veto machine” (Polish: wetomat).

==== Historical policy ====
During his presidency, Nawrocki has been opposed to Ukrainian ultranationalist and Nazi collaborationist symbolism and activities. Nawrocki pursued the criminalisation of Banderite ideology in Poland, including the equalisation of Banderite symbols with Nazi and communist symbolism. On 31 August 2025, the 45th anniversary of the August Agreements which created the Solidarity trade union, Nawrocki criticized former union leader and president Lech Wałęsa, stating that while Wałęsa cannot be forgotten, he must be correctly and truthfully remembered.

Nawrocki advocates for pursuing World War II reparations from Germany, which Poland never received. On a World War II anniversary on 1 September 2025, Nawrocki "unequivocally" demanded Germany pay Poland war reparations worth over 6 trillion PLN (1.4 trillion Euros), continuing the course set by the Law and Justice party. During a visit to Germany in September 2025, Nawrocki attempted to discuss the topic of war reparations, but was rejected, with Germany stating that the matter of war reparations is "definitively regulated". An alternative solution to paying war reparations proposed by Nawrocki was for Poland to receive financial aid for its military industry.

=== Foreign policy ===
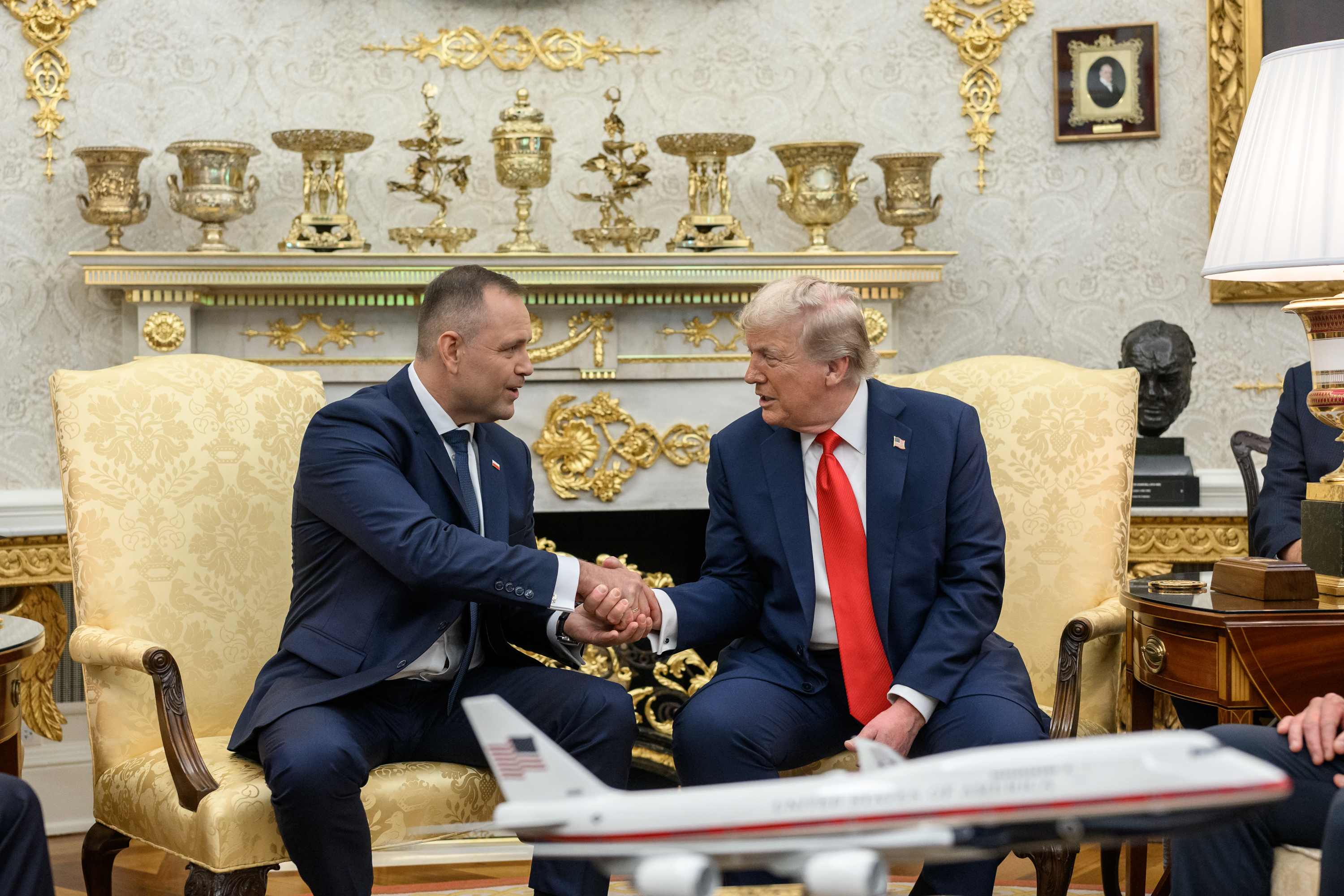
Nawrocki at a bilateral meeting with U.S. President Donald Trump on 3 September 2025
Nawrocki at a state banquet with Philippine President Bongbong Marcos in Manila on 6 October 2026

According to analysts, the dispute over whether the President or Prime Minister should represent Poland at international meetings is an axis of conflict between Tusk and Nawrocki, titled as a "war for the seat". On 13 August, Nawrocki represented Poland at a teleconference of Trump and European leaders regarding the upcoming 2025 Russia–United States summit in Alaska, a change from Tusk previously representing the country in international conferences. However, the lack of any Polish representation at an 18 August White house meeting caused controversy, with some blaming Nawrocki for not representing the country at the meeting.

During his presidency, Nawrocki attended many international meetings, and in September 2025, he began travelling abroad. In September alone, he visited: 3 September — Washington, D.C. for a meeting with Donald Trump, 5 September — a meeting with Pope Leo XIV, Italian Prime Minister Giorgia Meloni and President Sergio Mattarella in Rome; 8 September — in Vilnius with President of Lithuania Gitanas Nauseda; 9 September — in Helsinki with President of Finland Alexander Stubb; 16 September — a meeting in Berlin with Chancellor of Germany Friedrich Merz and President Frank-Walter Steinmeier; and with President of France Emmanuel Macron in Paris; 21–24 September — a visit to the United States in Doylestown, Pennsylvania, to meet with the local Polish diaspora, and New York for the 80th session of the United Nations General Assembly.

Soon after his inauguration, Nawrocki was invited to the White House by US President Donald Trump. With Nawrocki bringing no Ministry of Foreign Affairs delegates to the meeting, foreign minister Radosław Sikorski met separately with United States Secretary of State Marco Rubio. On 3 September, Nawrocki arrived to the meeting, where Trump affirmed his intention to maintain the presence of American troops in Poland and invited Nawrocki to the upcoming G20 summit in Florida.

In 2025, Nawrocki cancelled a planned meeting with Hungarian Prime Minister Viktor Orbán. One of Nawrocki's Chancellery members, Marcin Przydacz, explained how the president disapproved of Orbán's relationship with Russian President Vladimir Putin and the fact that the Hungarian leader had recently visited the Russian president. Przydacz added that President Nawrocki will seek to limit his diplomatic contacts with Orbán solely to Visegrád Group meetings.

In October 2026, Nawrocki became the first President of Poland to visit the Philippines since the two countries established diplomatic relations in 1973. During his state visit, he met with President of the Philippines Bongbong Marcos in Manila to discuss bilateral cooperation in defense, trade, investment, agriculture, technology, and other areas, as well as regional and international affairs.

==== Foreign policy stances toward the European Union ====
As president, Nawrocki opposes the EU–Mercosur Association Agreement, promising to uphold the slogan "Polish farmer, Polish field, Polish bread on the Polish table" (Polish: Polski rolnik, polskie pole, polski chleb na polskim stole). Nawrocki opposes the implementation of the EU Digital Services Act as proposed by the Tusk government, with the members of his Chancellery calling the proposed ability of the President of the Office of Electronic Communications to block content "too far-reaching".

==== Foreign policy stances toward Ukraine ====
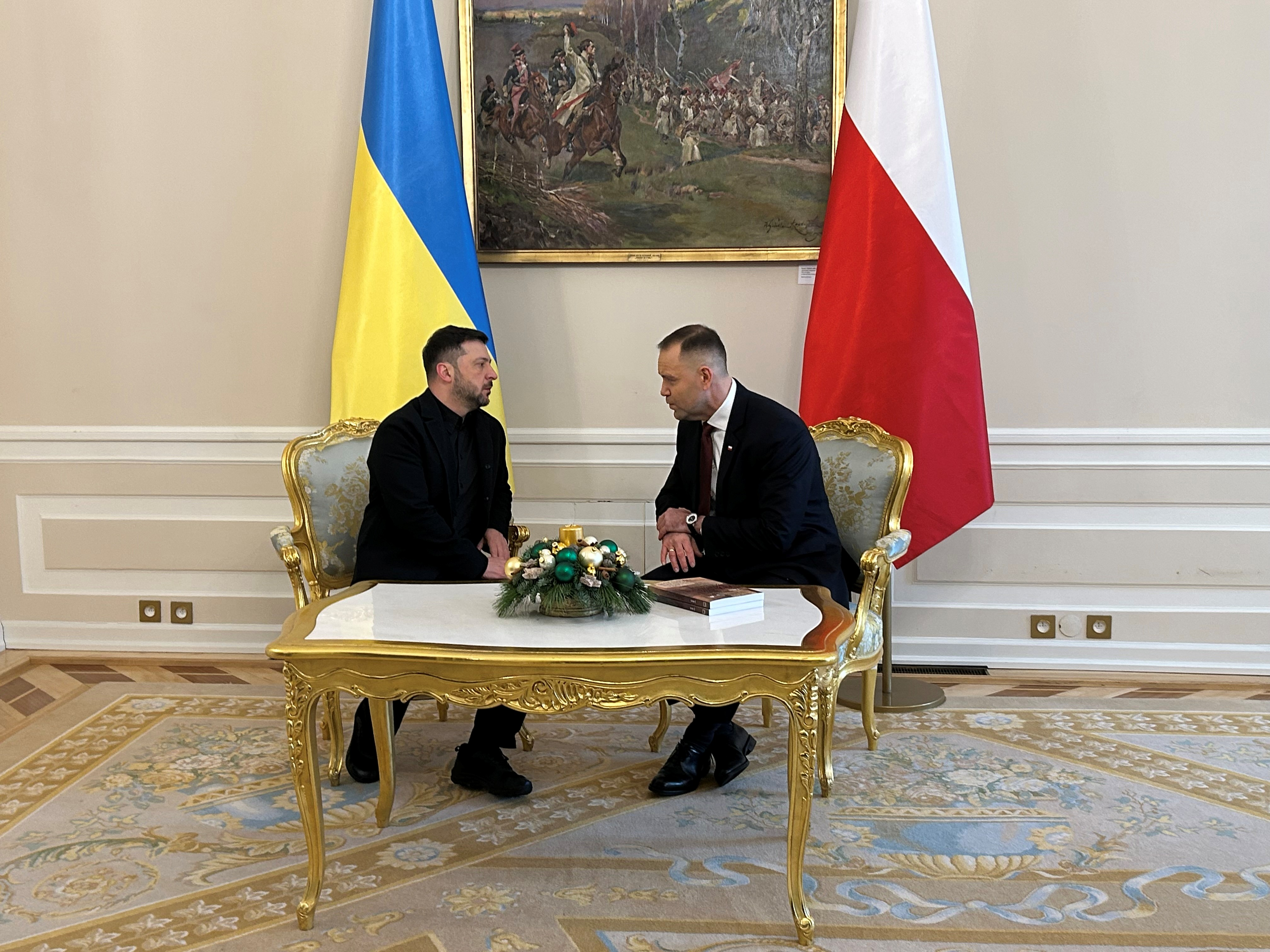
Meeting between Karol Nawrocki and Ukrainian President Volodymyr Zelenskyy on 19 December 2025

Nawrocki has presided over a significant deterioration in bilateral Poland-Ukraine relations.

In August 2025, Nawrocki vetoed a bill that would have extended financial support for Ukrainian refugees of the Russo-Ukrainian war not employed in Poland as well as funding for Starlink systems to maintain Ukraine's internet connectivity. Nawrocki was invited to meet with president Volodymyr Zelenskyy of Ukraine in its capital city, Kyiv, but Nawrocki rejected the invitation, suggesting that Zelenskyy should come to Poland instead. Nawrocki's response was supported by public opinion.

In May 2026, Nawrocki announced that he was considering stripping Zelenskyy of the Order of the White Eagle, Poland's highest state honour, after Zelenskyy honored a special operations forces unit with the name "Heroes of the Ukrainian Insurgent Army", a Nazi-collaborating organization that conducted a genocide against Poles in Volhynia. Nawrocki further stated that Ukraine is not ready to "be part of the European family" due to their mentality of "glorifying the bandits and murderers of the Ukrainian Insurgent Army." Zelesnkyy was previously conferred the honour in 2023 by Nawrocki's predecessor Andrzej Duda. On 19 June, Nawrocki officially revoked Zelenskyy's state decoration. On 20 June, Zelenskyy sent the order back to Nawrocki's chancellery via Nova Poshta, while the three former Ukrainian presidents, who were also the order's recipients - Leonid Kuchma, Viktor Yushchenko and Petro Poroshenko - declared they would also hand their orders back on the grounds that the row was harming the attempts they had made to improve ties with Poland.

=== Presidential nominations and Chancellery ===
- Chancellery of the President of the Republic of Poland
- President: Karol Nawrocki

Managers of the Chancellery of the President of the Republic of Poland
- Chief of the Chancellery: Zbigniew Bogucki
- SOS – Deputy of the Chief of the Chancellery: Adam Andruszkiewicz
- SOS – Chief of the Cabinet of the President: Paweł Szefernaker
- SOS – Deputy Chief of the Cabinet of the President: Jarosław Dębowski
- SOS in the BBN – Chief of the BBN: Bartosz Grodecki
- SOS – Chief of the Bureau of International Policy: Marcin Przydacz
- SOS: Wojciech Kolarski
- SOS: Mateusz Kotecki
- SOS – Press Spokesperson of the President: Rafał Leśkiewicz
- USOS: Agnieszka Jędrzak
- USOS: Karol Rabenda
- General Director of the Chancellery of the President: Magdalena Głowa

On 7 August 2025, Karol Nawrocki selected his appointees to the Chancellery of the President of the Republic of Poland (KPRP) — Zbigniew Bogucki as Chief of the Chancellery, clashing with Law and Justice's intention to seat Przemysław Czarnek in the position, Adam Andruszkiewicz as Deputy Chief of the Chancellery, Jarosław Dębowski as Deputy Chief of the Cabinet, Paweł Szefernaker as Chief of the Cabinet, Marcin Przydacz as Chief of the Bureau for International Policy, Rafał Leśkiewicz as the Press Spokesperson, Wojciech Kolarski as Secretary of State, Agnieszka Jędrzak, Mateusz Kotecki, Karol Rabenda as Undersecretaries of State, and Magdalena Głowa as General Director of the Chancellery. Nawrocki also appointed Jarosław Wąsowicz as his presidential chaplain.

Sławomir Cenckiewicz was appointed as the Chief of the National Security Bureau, with Mirosław Bryś and Andrzej Kowalski as his deputies. The Chancellery of the Prime Minister of Poland protested Cenckiewicz's appointment, restricting his access from secret information on 5 August, and New Left poseł Tomasz Trela suggested that Cenckiewicz's nomination should be withdrawn. Regardless, Cenckiewicz accepted Nawrocki's nomination. However, he resigned on 23 April 2026. Bartosz Grodecki was appointed as his successor, assuming the post on 8 May 2026.

Nawrocki's appointees came from two groups: Dębowski, Cenckiewicz, Jędrzak, Kotecki and Leśkiewicz were Nawrocki's coworkers at the Institute of National Remembrance. Other appointments came from the Law and Justice party — KPRP official Kolarski, former viceminister Rabenda, posełs Andruszkiewicz, Bogucki, Przydacz and Szefernaker, who left their parliamentary positions for the KPRP, with Bogumiła Olbryś, Michał Jach, Tomasz Rzymkowski and Marek Subocz respectively replacing them in the Sejm.

On 18 August 2025, Nawrocki appointed several presidential advisors: Jarosław Bujak, Dariusz Dudek, Piotr Głowacki, Radosław Gruk, Paweł Gruza, Magdalena Hajduk, Jan Kasprzyk, Beata Kempa, Tomasz Obszański, Błażej Poboży, Barbara Socha, Krzysztof Wacławek, Łukasz Witek, and social advisors: Wanda Buk, Piotr Czauderna, Alvin Gajadhur, Bogdan Kubiak, Sławomir Mazurek, Andrzej Nowak, Jacek Saryusz-Wolski and Leszek Skiba.

Other presidential nominations included:

- 29 October 2025 — Grzegorz Berendt as Special Representative for Historical Diplomacy
- 7 November 2025 — Grzegorz Ksepko as the presidential representative in the National Council of the Judiciary

== Political views ==
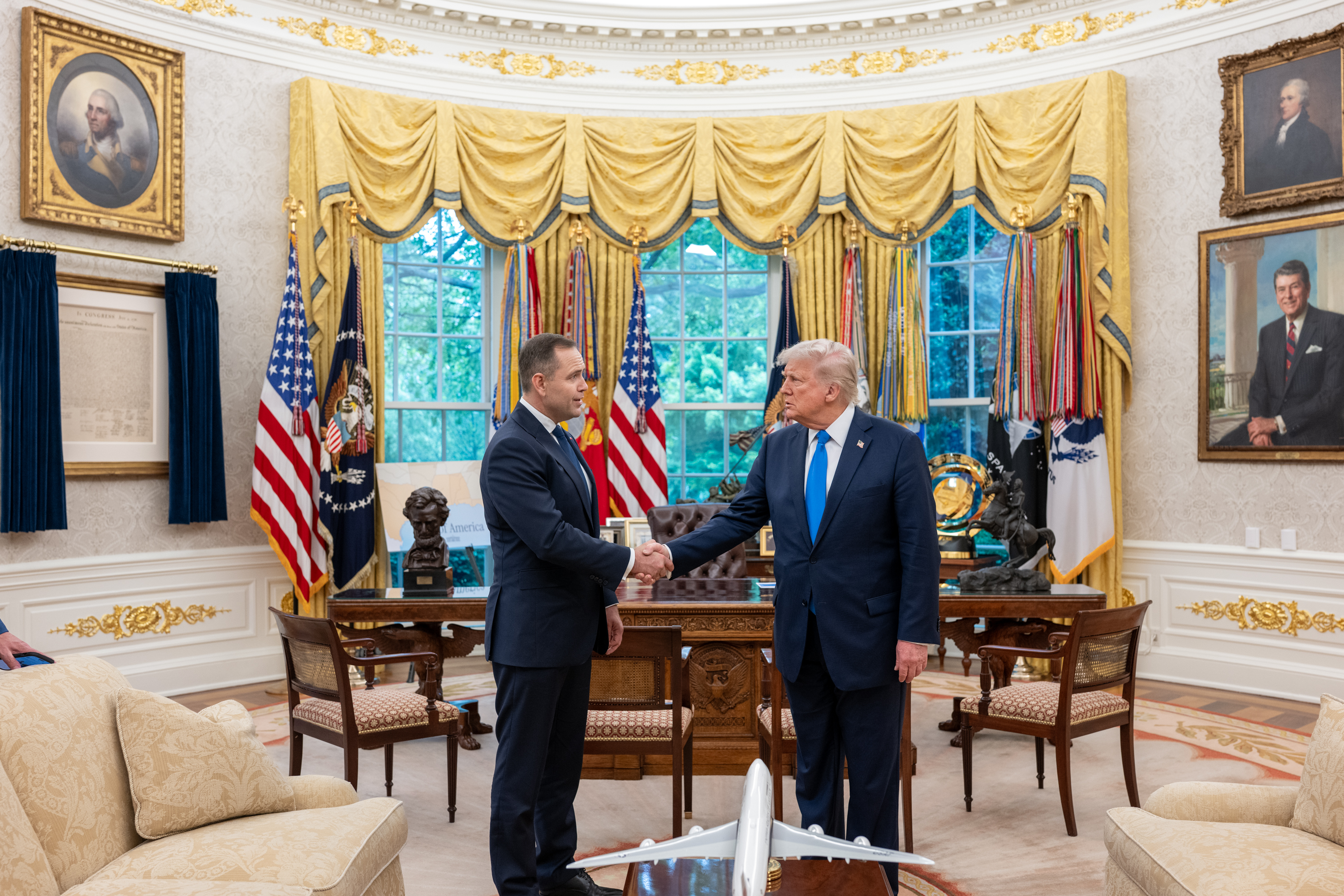
Nawrocki greeting US President Donald Trump, 1 May 2025

Nawrocki is considered a nonpartisan, but with a conservative outlook. Nawrocki describes himself as a "representative of the broadly defined patriotic camp", and stresses that he has never belonged to a political party. He considers himself a "citizens' candidate" that will end the "Polish-Polish war". He declared that he is ready to support "any Polish government that demands the exhumation of Polish victims in Volhynia", and describes issues of history and social accountability as his "demarcation lines". Euronews describes the political alignment of Nawrocki's campaign as "patriotic, pro-Christian, pro-NATO and favourable to president Donald Trump". The Financial Times described Nawrocki as "anti-liberal, anti-German, anti-EU". Xinhua described Nawrocki's values as "prioritising national sovereignty, Catholic social teaching, and skepticism toward the EU".

=== Social issues ===
Nawrocki is a Catholic with culturally conservative views; he accused the ruling coalition and LGBT groups of "sexualising children". He stated that he strongly opposes "reinterpreting gender identity", and would allow "no compromises", demonstratively throwing a copy of the cover of Gender Queer: A Memoir into a paper shredder in 2025. Nawrocki supports maintaining close ties between the Catholic Church in Poland and the Polish government, the broad criminalisation of abortion, and opposes the legalisation of same-sex marriage, civil unions or extending legal rights to people in same-sex relationships, citing Catholic sexual ethics.

During the campaign, Nawrocki stated: "There is a male sex and a female sex. And if anyone defies that, they don't understand the present, the past, or the future", and "marriage is a union between a man and a woman". Nawrocki also opposes euthanasia, and his position on abortion has been described as "even more conservative than that of PiS itself"; he stated that he would not allow the return of pre-2021 abortion laws in Poland, which allowed abortion in case of serious diseases, arguing: "I would not sign a law that would reinstate the agreement on abortion. As a future president, I cannot allow the abortion of children with Down syndrome."

He stresses his commitment to Polish patriotism, Christian values and national sovereignty, and has declared the need to defend traditional social values. He strongly opposes the removal of crosses from state buildings. He holds anti-communist views, and has criticised the Polish education system, claiming that it is controlled by the "post-communist party environment". In February 2024, he was listed as one of the persons wanted by the Russian Federation on criminal charges for the removal of monuments commemorating the Red Army erected in the Polish People's Republic in the years 1944–1989. He has described cursed soldiers as national heroes of Poland and praised PiS for implementing a National Remembrance Day in their honour. He is an opponent of the EU's migration policy and wishes to terminate the EU's migration pact.

=== Economics ===
Nawrocki's program has been described as economically interventionist, economically nationalist, and economically left-wing. He pledged to implement new policies that will combat "unfair competition" in the Polish economy. Nawrocki describes himself as a strong supporter of armaments and social investment programmes. In a speech in which he accepted Law and Justice's endorsement for his candidacy, Nawrocki pledged to abolish all overtime labor tax and to focus on large economic investments; he strongly supports the Central Communication Port project, and praised the Central Industrial Region and Stocznia Gdynia schemes developed in the interwar Second Polish Republic. Nawrocki expressed his fascination with other large investments such as the Vistula Spit canal and Świnoujście LNG terminal, and wants to pursue similar undertakings.

Nawrocki calls for "a welfare state with zero VAT on food". He promised to increase social spending, welfare benefits and pensions; he also supports welfare programmes and opposes adopting the Euro as Poland's currency. He stresses the lack of transport in Poland and has pledged to develop rail infrastructure in underdeveloped regions of the country. Nawrocki proposes to enact an additional tax on the owners of three or more apartments, with an exemption for families with children. His other proposals include abolishing tax on savings and increasing the annual indexation of pensions. He also expressed welfare chauvinist views - believing that Poles are "treated worse in their own country than immigrants", Nawrocki argues that social benefits in Poland should be for Poles only, and pensions for Ukrainian immigrants should be eliminated; additionally, Polish citizens should have a priority in healthcare, school and kindergarten queues. Nawrocki is also considered to align with "Trumpian tariffs and protectionism".

He objected to the Tusk government's cut in healthcare contributions for businesses and stated that he opposes any attempt to reduce healthcare funding. Nawrocki also signed a list of 11 pledges, including promises to not raise the retirement age, and to uphold worker protections, defend minimum wages, retain the ban on Sunday business activity, to promote economic patriotism, and to increase funding for the public health service and agriculture. Based on these pledges, he was endorsed by Poland's Solidarity trade union. He supports additional taxes on "digital giants operating online and targeting Polish users" and the expansion of social housing.

He argues that Poland needs to achieve "full energy sovereignty". He supports nuclear energy, describing it as "the most secure and stable one". He also criticised the European Green Deal, stating that while he supports environmental protection, he opposes "climate madness at the expense of Polish homes, workers and entrepreneurs". Nawrocki also believes that Poland needs to ensure its food security and respect "the sovereignty of the Polish countryside"; he has described rural Poland as "the mainstay of Polish culture, traditions and social values". He supports selective tax cuts, but is considered to not be economically liberal. He advocated for reducing the value-added tax rate from 23% to 22% during the 2025 campaign, as well as an exemption from personal income tax for families with two or more children. He also pledged to veto blanket tax increases.

=== Foreign policy ===
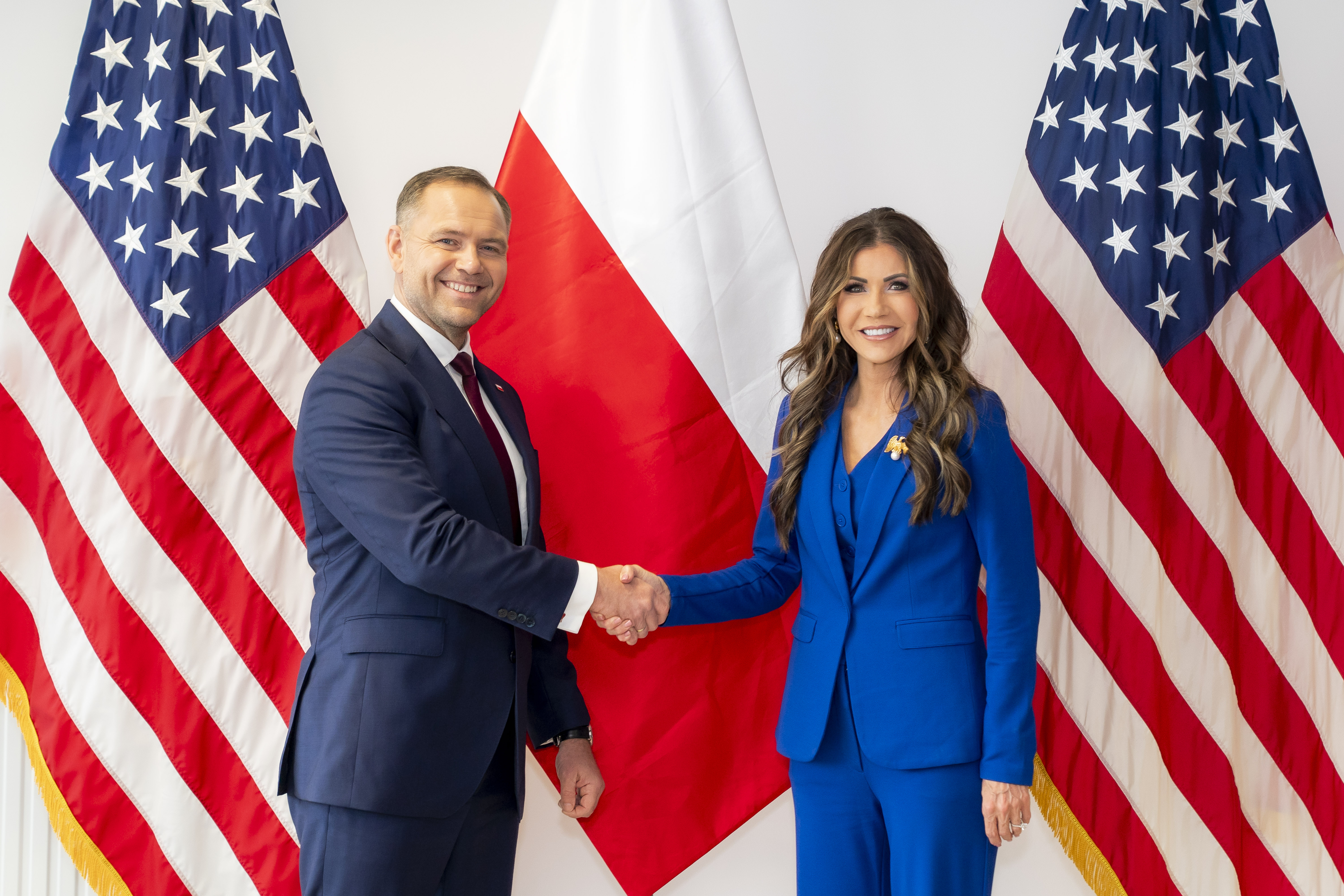
Nawrocki with DHS Secretary Kristi Noem, May 2025

Karol Nawrocki has emphasised in his statements that the geopolitical interest of Poland lies in pushing back the Russian Federation, stating that "Russia is imperialist in its foundation whether it is white terror, red terror or modern terror". According to him, the foundation of Poland's security is a strong position within NATO and a close alliance with the United States. He also supports regional alliances such as the Bucharest Nine and favours expanding this format to include Sweden and Finland. He advocates increasing defense spending and expanding the army to 300,000 troops, but opposes conscription or mandatory military training for young men.

Geopolitically, Nawrocki supports further strengthening Polish ties to the United States and NATO while opposing European integration. He opposes the federalisation of the European Union and stresses the need to maintain Polish national identity within the EU, adding that "Poland does not need a centralised state populated by EU citizens of Polish origin". Nawrocki accused the Donald Tusk's government of being submissive toward Germany, and advocated for the restoration of a balanced relationship between the two countries. He demands World War II reparations from Germany for material losses and war crimes committed in occupied Poland.

He supports ending the Russo-Ukrainian war by a peace agreement but argues that the issue of territorial cessions should be decided by the European community as well as Ukraine itself. Nawrocki opposed the deployment of Polish troops to Ukraine. He supported the normalisation of relations with Ukraine on a basis of partnership, as well as the recognition and dignified burial of Polish victims in Volhynia. Nawrocki is opposed to Ukrainian membership in NATO or the European Union until Ukraine accepts responsibility for the genocide of Poles in Volhynia. He has previously denounced attempts to downplay the 1943–1945 massacres of Poles in Volhynia and Eastern Galicia for the sake of improving Polish-Ukrainian relations.

Nawrocki distanced himself from the former pro-Ukrainian policy of PiS and criticised Ukraine for acting against Polish interests; to this end, Nawrocki calls for limiting military exports to Ukraine and distancing Poland from Ukraine in order to prioritize Polish interests over Ukrainian ones. He stated that he would punish the glorification of Ukrainian nationalist leader Stepan Bandera. He was accused of anti-Ukrainian sentiment, and "echoing Kremlin talking points about Ukraine". Responding to the accusations of speaking "Putin's language" on Ukraine, Nawrocki stated: "I speak the language of Polish people. Millions want to say that Zelensky mistreats us, but they're silenced with 'you're spreading Putin's propaganda'."

On 6 August 2026, the first anniversary of his inauguration, Nawrocki stated: "Yes, it is in Poland's interest that Ukraine and Ukrainian soldiers handle the war against the post-Soviet Russian Federation in the best way possible and that they (Ukrainians) keep them as far away as possible from Poland. Let them murder the Soviets that invaded them, it doesn't hurt us, Poles, at all. In that way, the Ukrainians can count on our aid because Poland will help wherever a moskal is being assaulted, whether or not we are directly involved in that war. That is our strategic interest, but it is also our strategic interest to keep Banderite flags out of Warsaw and Poland."

He was criticised in Israel for downplaying the role of Poles in the Holocaust. Nawrocki said he would defend Poland "against all disgusting attacks" by Holocaust scholars. Poland's foreign minister, Radosław Sikorski, publicly defended Nawrocki in response to the criticism. During the election campaign, Nawrocki defended the 2018 amendment that criminalized attributing responsibility for the Holocaust to the Polish nation, stating: "I am fighting for this truth. Poles are not antisemites. Many Poles lost their lives during World War II saving Jews." When asked about Israel, Nawrocki expressed his belief that "there is no state that is a chosen nation to live out its history". He also promised to end the tradition of lighting Hanukkah candles in the Presidential Palace, stating that commitment to Christian values would exclude celebrating Jewish holidays.

== Personal life ==
Karol Nawrocki is married to Marta Nawrocka (born in 1986), a graduate of the Faculty of Law and Administration at the University of Gdańsk and an employee of the National Revenue Administration. She specialises in the control of the oil industry and combating illegal trade. Together, they have two children: a son, Antoni and a daughter, Katarzyna. They also raised Daniel (born in 2003), Marta Nawrocka's son from a previous relationship. The couple married in 2010, and Karol Nawrocki adopted Daniel. The pair signed their son, Antoni, out of "health education" classes introduced by the Ministry of National Education under Barbara Nowacka. After Nawrocki's election in 2025, he initially moved into the Belweder, but in October of the same year moved to the Presidential Palace.

Daniel Nawrocki studies at the Faculty of Law and Administration at the University of Gdańsk. He is involved in journalism, working for Gazeta Morska and previously for Dziennik Bałtycki. In 2023, he was appointed a member of the Youth Sports Council under the Minister of Sport. He was also a member of the Youth Council of the City of Gdańsk and now serves as a neighbourhood councillor. In 2024, he ran unsuccessfully for a seat on the Gdańsk City Council as a candidate of the Law and Justice party.

== Public image ==
Graphical summary of Nawrocki's approval ratings

=== Public approval ===
During the first months of Nawrocki's presidency, he maintained a positive approval rating, being one of Poland's most popular politicians. His popularity was highest among Polish youth, with a United Surveys poll showing 73% approval among respondents aged 18–29, and lowest among those over 70, where approval stood at 42%.

=== Sports ===
Nawrocki's image is tied to sports, especially football and boxing. During the early stages of his 2025 presidential campaign, Nawrocki appeared in workout videos, and compared himself to Rocky, with his campaign merchandise portraying catchphrase "Now Rocky", a play on his surname. Nawrocki's participation in a football hooligans' fight (Polish: ustawka) between fans of Lechia Gdańsk and Lech Poznań was controversial, attracting praise and criticism. Since his inauguration, Nawrocki maintained his athletic and football-fan image, seen working out or attending football matches in Poland and on foreign visits. Polityka argues Nawrocki wants to be a "patron of football fans".

During a state visit to the Philippines in October 2026, Nawrocki participated in a boxing training session with Filipino former professional boxer Manny Pacquiao.

=== Public engagement ===
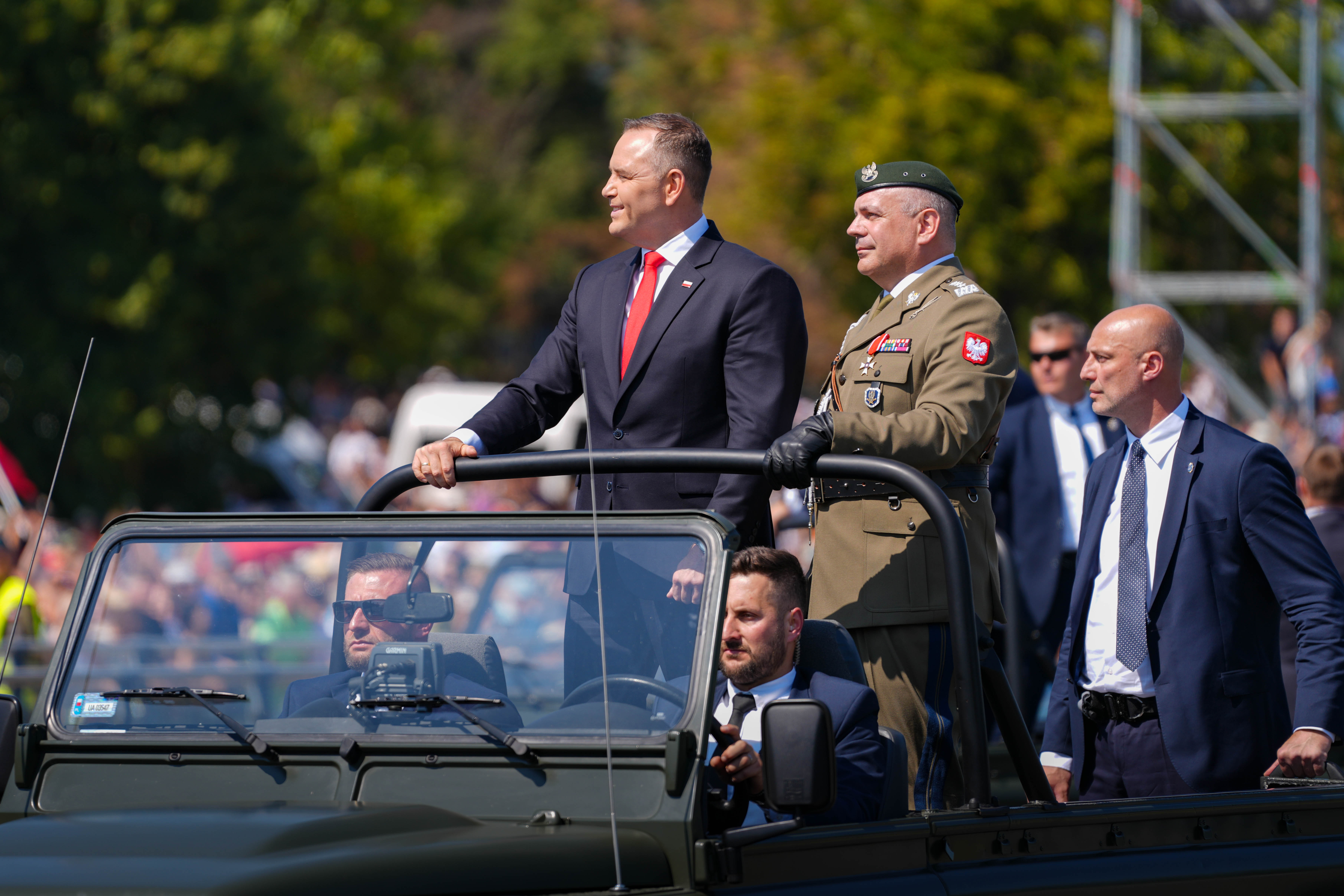
Karol Nawrocki at Polish Armed Forces Day on 15 August 2025

Nawrocki's image as president has been compared to President of the United States Donald Trump. Nawrocki was described as a president close to the people, a "people's president" or tribune of the people (Polish: trybun ludowy). He was also applauded for actively representing Poland in international visits. Besides exercising in public, Nawrocki also appeared in public with various members of the public, including eating a kebab with youth from a remote village as part of a casual campaign promise and speaking with Polish citizens who called out for him during a visit to the United States.

During his 2025 presidential campaign, Nawrocki portrayed himself as a nonpartisan "citizens' candidate" (Polish: kandydat obywatelski), and as an authentic "flesh and bone man" (Polish: człowiek z krwi i kości).

=== Independence March appearance ===
Nawrocki appeared at the 2025 Independence March on 11 November.

== Honours and awards ==
Country	Decoration	Date of issue
Poland	Silver Cross of Merit	19 October 2021
Poland	Bronze Cross of Merit	4 November 2016
Poland	Pro Patria Medal	4 August 2018
Poland	Bene Merito honorary distinction	9 July 2020
Poland	Commemorative Medal of the Thirtieth Anniversary of the Establishment of the Border Guard	29 September 2022
Poland	Pro Bono Poloniae Medal	4 December 2023
Poland	Order of the White Eagle (ex officio)	6 August 2025
Poland	Grand Cross of the Order of Polonia Restituta (ex officio)	6 August 2025

== Notes ==
Civic offices
Preceded by Paweł Machcewicz	Director of the Museum of the Second World War; 2017–2021	Succeeded by Grzegorz Berendt
Preceded by Jarosław Szarek	President of the Institute of National Remembrance; 2021–2025	Vacant
Political offices
Preceded by Andrzej Duda	President of Poland; 2025–present	Incumbent
Order of precedence
First	Order of precedence of Poland; President	Succeeded by Włodzimierz Czarzasty as Marshal of the Sejm
