= Polish-Jewish Studies =

- Type: History magazine
- Owner: Institute of National Remembrance
- Editor: Grzegorz Berendt
- Founded: 2020; 6 years ago
- Headquarters: Warsaw
- Country: Poland
- ISSN: 2719-4086
- Website: Polish-Jewish Studies

Polish-Jewish Studies is an annual, peer-reviewed journal which is published by the Institute of National Remembrance since 2020, focused on Polish-Jewish history.

== Editors ==
The journal's Editor-in-Chief is Grzegorz Berendt. Its editorial board includes Tomasz Domański, Sebastian Piątkowski and Elżbieta Rączy. John Radzilowski, Marek Jan Chodakiewicz, Bogdan Musiał, Peter Stachura, Mirosław Szumiło, Stanisław Wiech and Przemysław Kantyka are among its consulting editors.

== Reception ==
Kornelia Kończal, historian and an assistant professor at Bielefeld University, found the absence of international scholars as well as those from the Polish Center for Holocaust Research or the many centers for Jewish studies across Polish universities in the editorial board conspicuous. Writing before the journal published its first issue, she made a prediction that the journal will "solidify the narrative of Polish innocence and self-sacrifice in helping Jews during the war".

Joanna Tokarska-Bakir, chair of the Institute of Slavic Studies at the Polish Academy of Sciences, replied to a critical review of her work published in that journal. Finding it unfair, she exclaimed that even to enquire whether the journal had any meaningful peer-review process was a rhetorical exercise; she also noted that three editors associated with the journal as of the time she was writing her article (Berendt, Chodakiewicz, and Rafał Sierchuła) had at various points engaged in controversial speech on Jews.
