= Grzegorz Berendt =

Polish historian

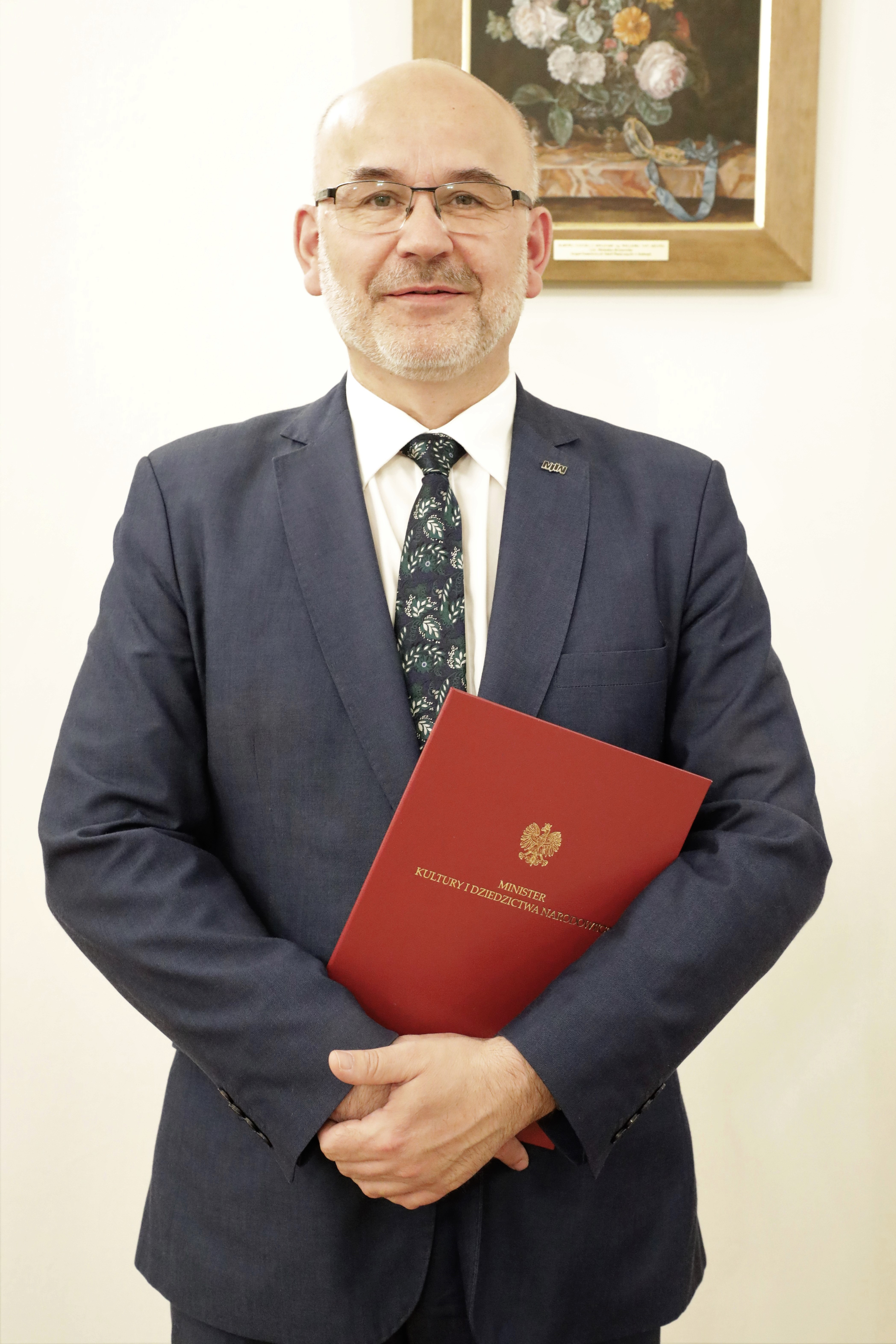
- Berendt in 2022

Director of the Museum of the Second World War
- In office 21 July 2022 – 31 March 2024
- Preceded by: Karol Nawrocki
- Succeeded by: Rafał Wnuk

Personal details
- Born: 1964 (age 61–62)
- Education: University of Gdańsk
- Occupation: Historian

Grzegorz Berendt (born 1964) is a Polish historian. He is a professor at the University of Gdańsk and affiliated with the Institute of National Remembrance. Berendt was the director of the Museum of the Second World War from 2022 to 2024.

== Career ==
Berendt is an associate professor at the University of Gdańsk in the Department of History of Culture of Political Thought; his research focuses on the history of Polish Jews and other ethnic groups in Pomerania in the twentieth century. He also serves as the Chairman of the Scientific Council of the Jewish Historical Institute.

In May 2017, Berendt was appointed as the deputy director of the Museum of the Second World War (MWS), replacing Janusz Marszalec and Piotr M. Majewski. In June 2021, he was appointed as the acting director; a year later, he was appointed a full director for a seven-year term. The same month, he was appointed chairman of the International Council of the Auschwitz-Birkenau State Museum.

=== IPN ===
Berendt has been associated with the Institute of National Remembrance since 2006, including stints as the head of the Public Education Branch and as the head of the Department of Historical Research in the Gdańsk office. From 2007 to 2008 he was a coordinator of the INDEX research project, focusing on investigating the cases of Nazi-German reprisals against the Polish citizens who helped Jews during the Holocaust. He is the editor-in-chief of Polish-Jewish Studies.

== Views and reception ==
=== Polish culpability in the Holocaust ===
Berendt has clashed with other historians about the question of Polish culpability in the Holocaust. In 2017, Jan Grabowski, writing in Haaretz, responded to a piece critiquing him that Berendt had published in Haaretz the previous month. Grabowski stated that Berendt believed the Blue Police to have persecuted the Jews only at the behest of their German masters without exercising any significant agency; and that Berendt finds it unreasonable to expect heroism from "regular people" when rendering aid to Jews during the Nazi occupation was punishable by death. Grabowski found Berendt's assertions ahistorical, and vice versa. According to Joanna Tokarska-Bakir, on a conference marking the 70th anniversary of the Warsaw Ghetto Uprising that she attended, Berendt disagreed with Jan T. Gross' assertion that the Polish bystanders were passively complicit in the Holocaust and cited the Poles' own "struggle to survive" as an exculpatory factor; he then went on to suggest that queries on the complicity of Polish bystanders might just as well be reciprocated with questions on why Jews in hiding were not interested in the poverty of those sheltering them.

Grabowski rejected Berendt's claims about the lack of agency — citing his own research which had documented not only Polish policemen killing Jews of their own without any German involvement but also numerous Poles volunteering to locate and kill Jews — and further noted that a majority of Poles were willing to flout a variety of regulations – all theoretically capable of incurring the death penalty – but only shied away from coming to the aid of Jews. Tokarska-Bakir found Berendt to have created an unsubstantiated false equivalence between the Jews and Poles under the Nazis in his bid to challenge the very existence of moral obligations in times of war. Adam Leszczyński notes that within the IPN, Berendt is considered one of those most keen to downplay the extent of Poles' complicity in the Holocaust;

== Bibliography ==
- (1997). Żydzi na terenie Wolnego Miasta Gdańska w latach 1920–1945: działalność kulturalna, polityczna i socjalna. Gdańsk: Gdańskie Towarzystwo Naukowe. ISBN 9788387359089
- (2000). Żydzi na gdańskim rozdrożu (1945–1950). Gdynia: Wydawnictwo 44.
- (2008). Życie żydowskie w Polsce w latach 1950–1956. Z dziejów Towarzystwa Społeczno–Kulturalnego Żydów w Polsce. Gdańsk : Wydawnictwo Uniwersytetu Gdańskiego. ISBN 8373263853
- (2014, with Aleksandra Namysło). Rejestr faktów represji na obywatelach polskich za pomoc ludności żydowskiej w okresie II wojny światowej. Warsaw: Instytut Pamięci Narodowej i Instytut Studiów Strategicznych. ISBN 978-83-7629-669-2

Civic offices
| Preceded by Karol Nawrocki | Director of the Museum of the Second World War; 2022 – 2024 | Succeeded by Rafał Wnuk |
