= Sławomir Cenckiewicz =

Polish historian, publicist, and politician

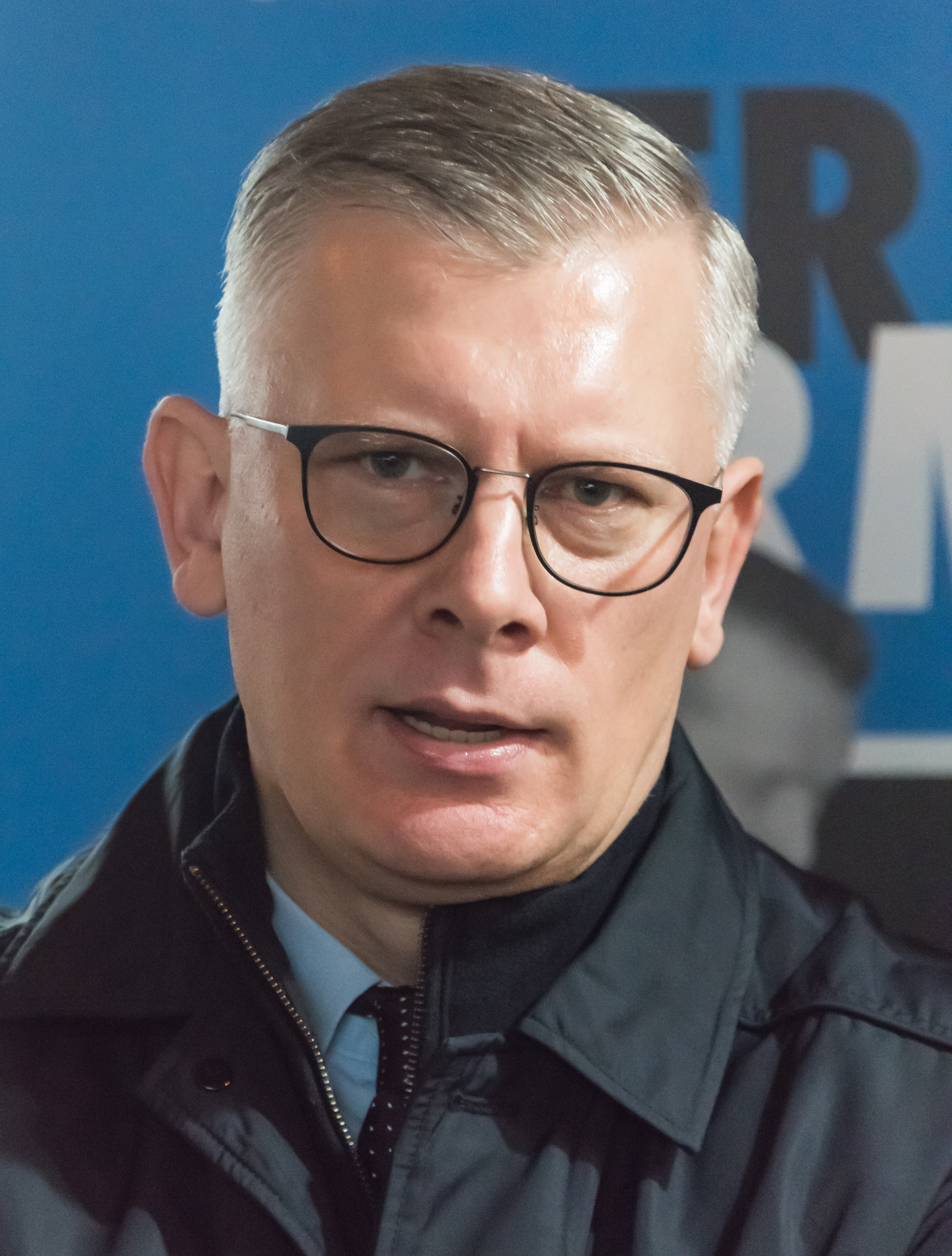
- Cenckiewicz in 2022

Head of the National Security Bureau
- In office 7 August 2025 – 23 April 2026
- Appointed by: Karol Nawrocki
- Preceded by: Dariusz Łukowski
- Succeeded by: Andrzej Kowalski (acting)

Personal details
- Born: Sławomir Ryszard Cenckiewicz; 20 July 1971 (age 55) Gdynia, Poland
- Education: University of Gdańsk

Sławomir Ryszard Cenckiewicz (born 20 July 1971) is a Polish historian, publicist, civil servant, and politician. He served as Head of the National Security Bureau in the Presidential Chancellery of Karol Nawrocki from August 2025 to April 2026. He previously worked at the Institute of National Remembrance and in other public administration roles related to archival and historical research, as well as in academia and journalism.

A historian specialising in contemporary history of Poland, his research and journalistic interests include communist rule in the Polish People's Republic, as well as political opposition, emigration, and secret police activities.

== Early life and education ==
Sławomir Ryszard Cenckiewicz was born on 20 July 1971 in Gdynia, Poland. He studied history at the University of Gdańsk and graduated in 1997 with a master's thesis titled The Genesis of Left-wing and Liberal Opposition in the Polish People's Republic (1956–1968), written under the suppervision of Roman Wapiński. In 2003, he obtained a doctorate with the dissertation Tadeusz Katelbach (1897–1977): A Political Biography, again written under the supervision of Wapiński. In 2011, Cenckiewicz achieved habilitation at the Cardinal Stefan Wyszyński University in Warsaw based on his book Anna Solidarność: Life and Activity of Anna Walentynowicz in the Years 1929–2010, published in 2010.

== Career ==
He gained much media attention following the 2008 publication of a book he co-authored with Piotr Gontarczyk, SB a Lech Wałęsa. Przyczynek do biografii (The SB and Lech Wałęsa: Contribution to a Biography), about Lech Wałęsa's service as an informant of the communist Służba Bezpieczeństwa. Gontarczyk and Cenckiewicz argued that in the 1970s the Solidarity leader and former President of Poland Lech Wałęsa was a secret informant for the Polish communist secret police, the Służba Bezpieczeństwa (SB).

In January 2016, Cenckiewicz was appointed Director of the Central Military Archives (CAW) and Plenipotentiary for Military Archives Reform by Minister of National Defence Antoni Macierewicz. On 4 June 2016, the Military Historical Bureau was established through the merger of the CAW and the Military Bureau for Historical Research (previously part of the Military Center for Civic Education), with Cenckiewicz becoming its head. He announced his resignation on 11 December 2023.

Following the reform of the Institute of National Remembrance (IPN) and the reintroduction of its advisory Collegial Board, Cenckiewicz was elected a member of the board by the Sejm on 23 June 2016, upon nomination by the Law and Justice party. He then became its deputy chair on 28 June 2016.

Cenckiewicz resigned as a member of the IPN Collegial Board on 21 December 2021 to become research advisor to the President of the Institute of National Remembrance, Karol Nawrocki, on 3 January 2022.

In July 2025, Cenckiewicz was announced by President-elect Karol Nawrocki as his nominee for Head of the National Security Bureau and was appointed on 7 August 2025. He submitted his resignation on 22 April 2026 and left office the following day.

=== Other activities ===
- Polonia Aid Foundation Trust, London, scholarship (2000, 2004)
- Kościuszko Foundation, New York City, scholarly grant (2000)
- Foundation for Free Speech, Chicago, scholarship (2005)
- State Archives, member and deputy chair of the Archival Council to the Director General of the State Archives (2020–2023)

== Political stances ==
Cenckiewicz opposes a renewed Jedwabne exhumation.

Cenckiewicz identifies as a follower of traditionalist Catholicism and has criticized Pope Francis and his positions for what Cenckiewicz says has hastened secularization in Catholic countries.

== Books ==
- Oczami bezpieki: szkice i materiały z dziejów aparatu bezpieczeństwa PRL, Kraków: Wyd. Arcana, 2005, ISBN 83-89243-76-8
- Tadeusz Katelbach (1897–1977): biografia polityczna, Wydawnictwo LTW, Warszawa 2005, ISBN 83-88736-59-0 =doctoral dissertation=
- SB a Lech Wałęsa. Przyczynek do biografii, Warszawa 2008, ISBN 978-83-60464-74-8 [co-authored with Piotr Gontarczyk ].
- Sprawa Lecha Wałęsy, Poznań: Zysk i s-ka, 2008, ISBN 978-83-7506-242-7.
- Śladami bezpieki i partii. Rozprawy - Źródła - Publicystyka, Wydawnictwo LTW, Łomianki, 2009. ISBN 9788375650600
- Gdański Grudzień '70, Wydawnictwo IPN, Gdańsk-Warszawa 2009., ISBN 978-83-7629-054-6
- Anna Solidarność. Życie i działalność Anny Walentynowicz na tle epoki (1929-2010), Zysk i S-ka, 2010. ISBN 9788375065077
- Długie ramię Moskwy. Wywiad wojskowy Polski Ludowej 1943-1991 (wprowadzenie do syntezy), Zysk i S-ka, 2011. ISBN 9788375068757
- Lech Kaczyński. Biografia polityczna 1949–2005, Zysk i S-ka, 2013, ISBN 978-83-7785-229-3 (other authors: Anna Piekarska, Adam Chmielecki, Janusz Kowalski)
- Wałęsa. Człowiek z teczki, Zysk i S-ka, 2013, ISBN 978-83-7785-356-6
- Atomowy szpieg. Ryszard Kukliński i wojna wywiadów, Wydawnictwo Zysk i S-ka, Poznań 2014 ISBN 978-83-7785-477-8
- Konfidenci, Editions Spotkania, Warszawa 2015 [co-authored with Witold Bagieński and Piotr Woyciechowski] ISBN 978-83-7965-104-7
- Prezydent. Lech Kaczyński 2005–2010, Wydawnictwo Fronda, Warszawa 2016 [co-authored with Adam Chmielecki] ISBN 978-83-8079-049-0
- Pułkownik Ignacy Matuszewski, IPN – Wojskowe Biuro Historyczne im. gen broni Kazimierza Sosnkowskiego, Warszawa 2017
- Anna Walentynowicz (1929–2010), Instytut Pamięci Narodowej, Warszawa 2017 [co-authored with Adam Chmielecki], ISBN 978-83-8098-235-2
- Geneza Ludowego wojska Polskiego 1943–1945, Akademia Sztuki Wojennej, Warszawa 2017, ISBN 978-83-949074-0-2
- Tomasz Piątek i jego kłamstwa, Wojskowy Instytut Wydawniczy, Warszawa 2017 [co-authored with Dominik Smyrgała]; in English: Tomasz Piątek and his lies, Wojskowy Instytut Wydawniczy, Warszawa 2017
- Agentura. Wałęsa, Skubiszewski, Kieżun, Hermaszewski, Rotfeld i inni, LTW, Dziekanów Leśny 2022, ISBN 978-83-7565-796-8
- Transformacja. Mazowiecki, Magdalenka, Czempiński, Petelicki, WSI, Komorowski, „Afera marszałkowska”, Tusk, LTW, Dziekanów Leśny 2022, ISBN 978-83-7565-782-1
- Historia. „Dziadek z UB”, Ludowe Wojsko (nie)Polskie, Zychowszczyzna, Vaticanum II, Lefebvre, Bergoglio i inni. LTW, Dziekanów Leśny 2023, ISBN 978-83-7565-823-1
- Zgoda. Rząd i służby Tuska w objęciach Putina, Transatlantic Foundation, Warszawa 2024, [co-authored with Michał Rachoń] ISBN 978-83-972668-0-3
