= Piotr Czauderna =

Member of the National Development Council
- Incumbent
- Assumed office 2015
- President: Andrzej Duda

Vice chairman of the Gdańsk City Council
- Incumbent
- Assumed office 2014

Member of the Gdańsk City Council from the 2nd District
- Incumbent
- Assumed office 2014

Personal details
- Born: Piotr Stefan Czauderna; 11 August 1962 (age 64) Gdańsk, Poland
- Party: -
- Education: Gdańsk Medical University; University of Provence
- Profession: Pediatric surgeon

Piotr Stefan Czauderna (born 11 August 1962) is a member of the National Development Council of Poland. He was appointed to the position by President Andrzej Duda in November 2015.

== Biography ==
Czauderna was born on 11 August 1962. He is a graduate of the Gdańsk Medical University and the University of Provence. A professor of medical science since 2013, Czauderna is currently the Head of the Surgery and Urology Clinic for Children and Adolescents of the Gdańsk Medical University. He was elected to the Gdańsk City Council in 2014 from the Law and Justice party. Czauderna is the vice chairman of the Gdańsk City Council. Czauderna was appointed as a member of the National Development Council by President Andrzej Duda in November 2015.
