= Wojciech Kolarski =

Polish politician and official (born 1972))

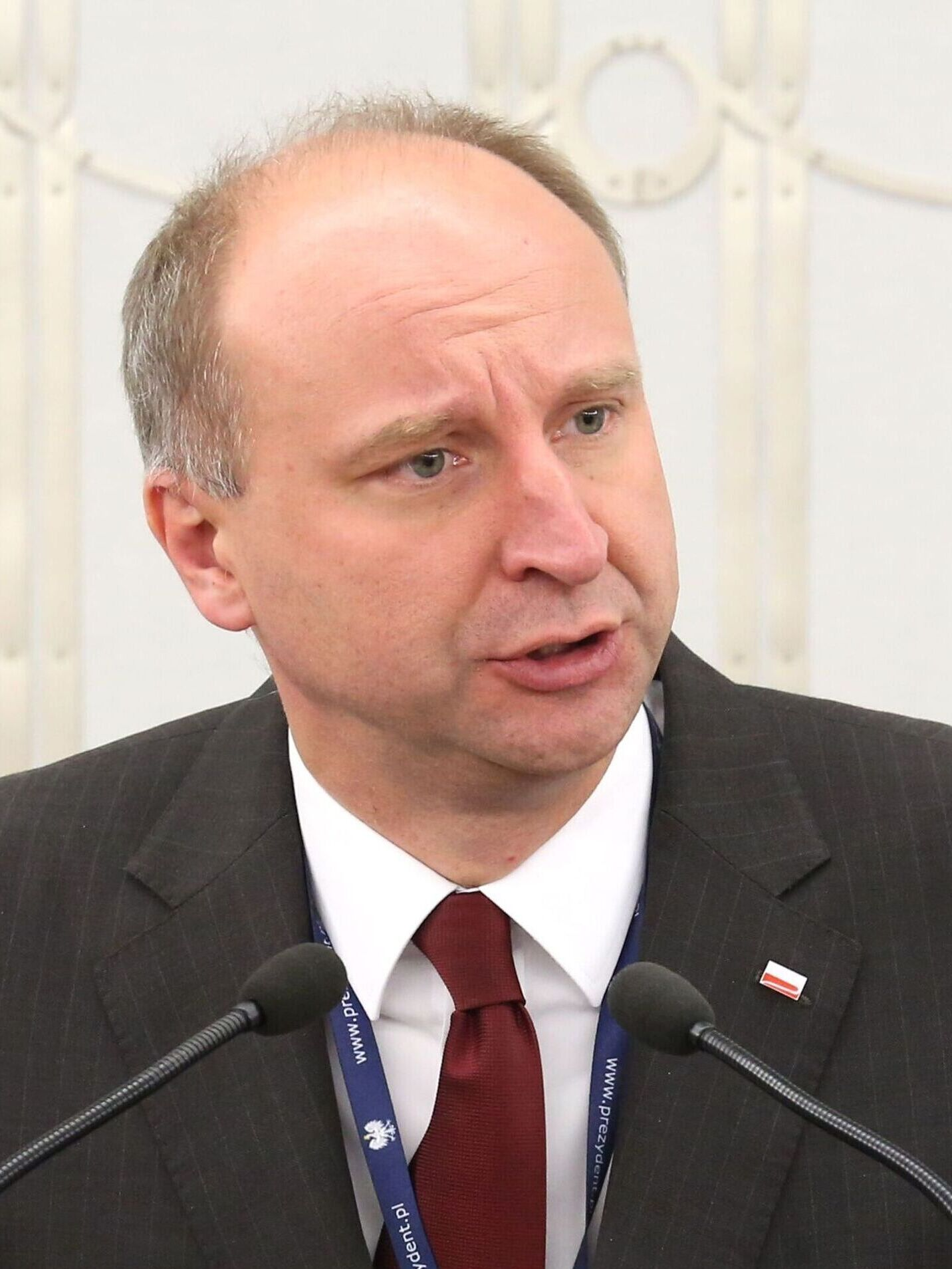
- Wojciech Kolarski, 2015
- Born: 29 October 1972 (age 53)
- Education: Pontifical University of John Paul II

Wojciech Kolarski (born 29 October 1972) is a politician and official, secretary of state in the Chancellery of the President of the Republic of Poland.

== Biography ==
He studied philosophy and sociology at the Jagiellonian University. He graduated in philosophy from the Pontifical University of John Paul II in Kraków. He earned a postgraduate diploma in contemporary european studies from the University of Sussex, having taken part in the UK government scholarship programme.

He was chief of office of Jan Rokita. He co-founded the association Nasze Bielany. From 2011 to 2015 he was director of offices of Andrzej Duda during Duda's term as member of Sejm and as MEP. In 2014 he was elected member of the Council of the City of Kraków, as candidate of Law and Justice.

On 7 August 2015, he was appointed undersecretary of state at the Chancellery of the President of the Republic of Poland, Andrzej Duda. On 2 May 2019 Andrzej Duda appointed him secretary of state at the Chancellery of the President of the Republic of Poland.

In April 2024 he was a candidate of Law and Justice in the European Parliament election. On 7 April 2025 he was appointed secretary of state at the Chancellery of the President of the Republic of Poland by Karol Nawrocki.

== Awards ==
- Officer's Cross of the Order of Polonia Restituta (2025)
- Order of the Cross of Terra Mariana, 2nd class (2025)
