= Bartosz Grodecki =

Polish diplomat, civil servant (born 1980)

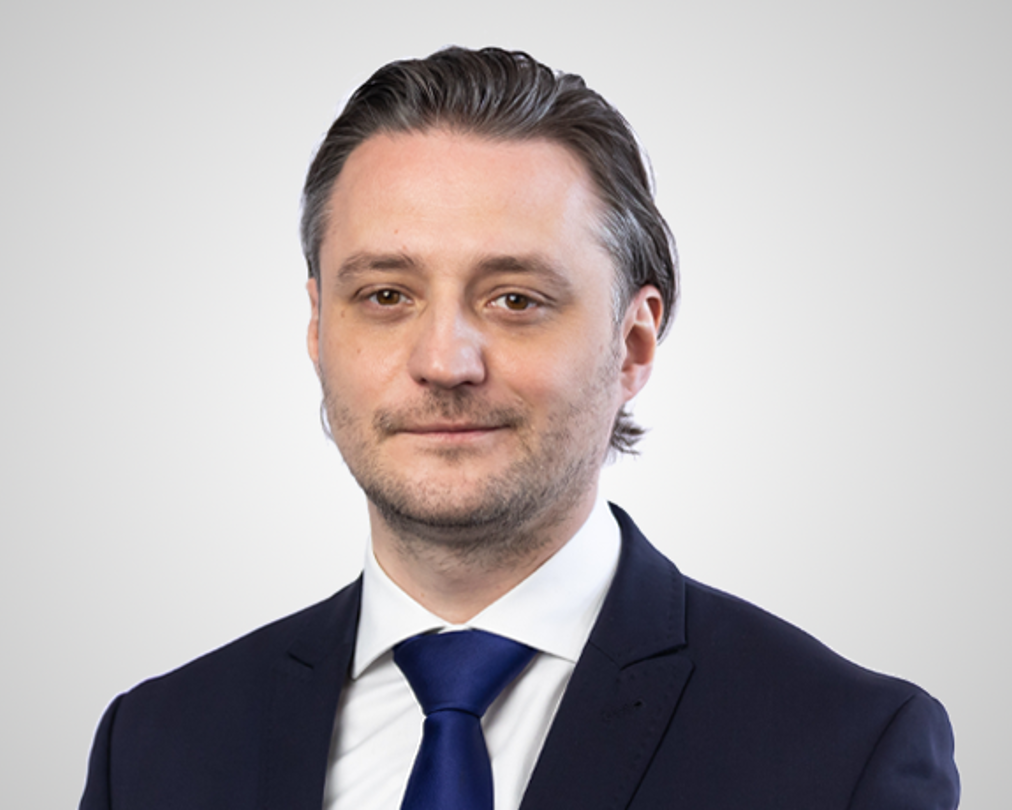
- Bartosz Grodecki in 2020

Head of the National Security Bureau
- Incumbent
- Assumed office 8 May 2026
- Appointed by: Karol Nawrocki
- Preceded by: Andrzej Kowalski (acting)

Deputy Minister of the Ministry of the Interior and Administration
- In office 3 March 2020 – 14 December 2023
- Appointed by: Mateusz Morawiecki
- Preceded by: Renata Szczęch
- Succeeded by: Wiesław Leśniakiewicz

Personal details
- Born: 1 September 1980 (age 46) Warsaw
- Education: University of Warsaw
- Occupation: diplomat civil servant
- Awards: Cross of Merit

Bartosz Przemysław Grodecki (born 1 September 1980 in Warsaw) is a Polish diplomat and civil servant; from 2020 to 2023, he served as Undersecretary of State at the Ministry of the Interior and Administration, and since 2026, he has been the Head of the National Security Bureau.

== Biography ==
Bartosz Grodecki was born to Jacek and Małgorzata Grodeckis. In 1999, he graduated from General Józef Sowiński High School No. 3 in Warsaw. He holds a degree in political science from the Faculty of Journalism and Political Science at the University of Warsaw, which he obtained in 2005.

He also completed a postgraduate MBA in cybersecurity management at the Faculty of Cybernetics of the Military University of Technology. He embarked on a career in diplomacy. In 2006, he began working at the Ministry of Foreign Affairs (initially, among other roles, as an assistant to the minister). He served at diplomatic missions in Los Angeles, Malmö and Stockholm. From March to June 2013, he was the consul responsible for the closure of the Consulate General of the Republic of Poland in Malmö. In 2017, he became Director of the Consular Department at the Ministry of Foreign Affairs.

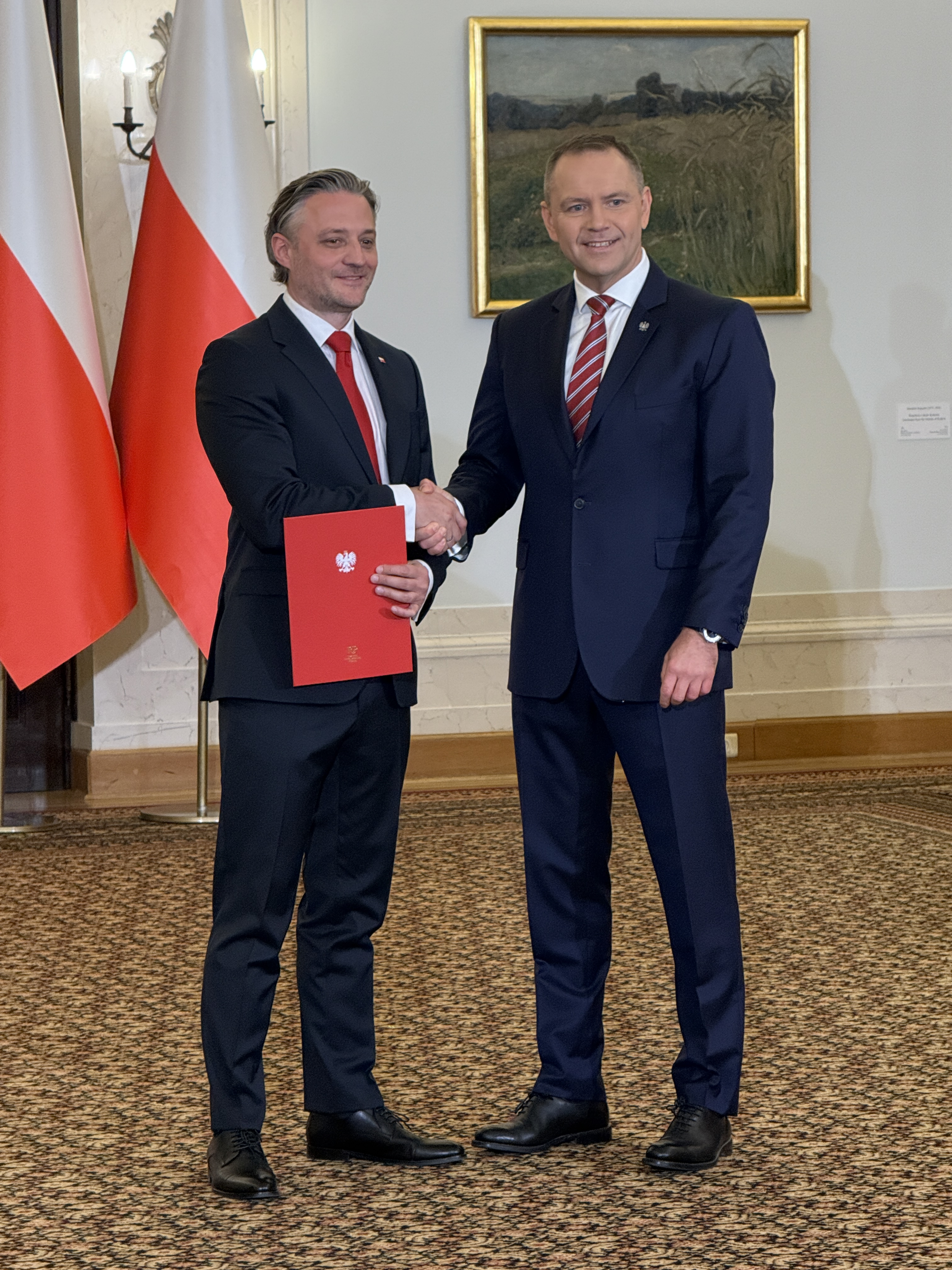
Bartosz Grodecki at his appointment as Head of the National Security Bureau

On 3 March 2020, he was appointed Undersecretary of State at the Ministry of the Interior and Administration. He coordinated the activities of the Department of International Affairs and Migration, the Department of Civil Affairs, the Department of Citizenship and Repatriation, the Department of Information and Communication Technology, and the Department of Permits and Licences. He was also responsible for supervising the head of the Office for Foreigners.

He also served as Coordinator for Polish-German Cross-Border and Regional Cooperation. On 27 March 2020, he was appointed Government Plenipotentiary for Repatriation. On 7 December of the same year, he was appointed by Prime Minister Mateusz Morawiecki to the post of Government Plenipotentiary for Large-Scale Information Systems of the European Union. He was dismissed from his government posts on 13 December 2023. In May 2026, he was appointed head of the National Security Bureau.

== Awards ==
- Silver Cross of Merit (13 November 2019).
