= Jarosław Szarek =

Polish journalist, writer and historian

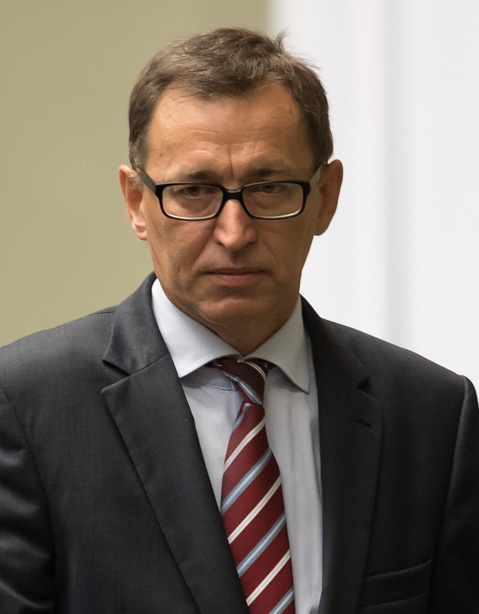
Szarek in 2016

Jarosław Szarek (born 1963) is a Polish journalist, writer and historian. Employee of the Bureau of Public Education of the Institute of National Remembrance (IPN). He specializes in the recent communist-era history of Poland.

Szarek was appointed as president of the IPN on 22 July 2016, and was succeeded on 23 July 2021 by Karol Nawrocki.

== Selected works ==
- Czy ktoś przebije ten mur? Sprawa Stanisława Pyjasa (coauthor, 2001)
- Polska. Historia 1943–2003 (coauthor, 2003)
- Ofiara Sprawiedliwych. Rodzina Ulmów – oddali życie za ratowanie Żydów (coauthor, 2004)
- Stan wojenny w Małopolsce w relacjach świadków (coauthor, 2005)
- Komunizm w Polsce (coauthor, 2005)
- Królowo Polski, przyrzekamy! Jasnogórskie Śluby Narodu Polskiego (coauthor, 2006)
- Zakopiańska Solidarność 1980–1989 (coauthor, 2006).
