= National Development Council (Poland) =

- Narodowa Rada Rozwoju

Agency overview
- Formed: 2009
- Jurisdiction: President of Poland
- Website: Official website

The National Development Council (Polish: Narodowa Rada Rozwoju), or NRR, is the principal forum used by some Presidents of Poland for considering policy matters. It was established by Lech Kaczyński in 2009 and, following a hiatus, was reestablished by Andrzej Duda in 2015.
