= National Security Bureau (Poland) =

Polish government agency

- Biuro Bezpieczeństwa Narodowego
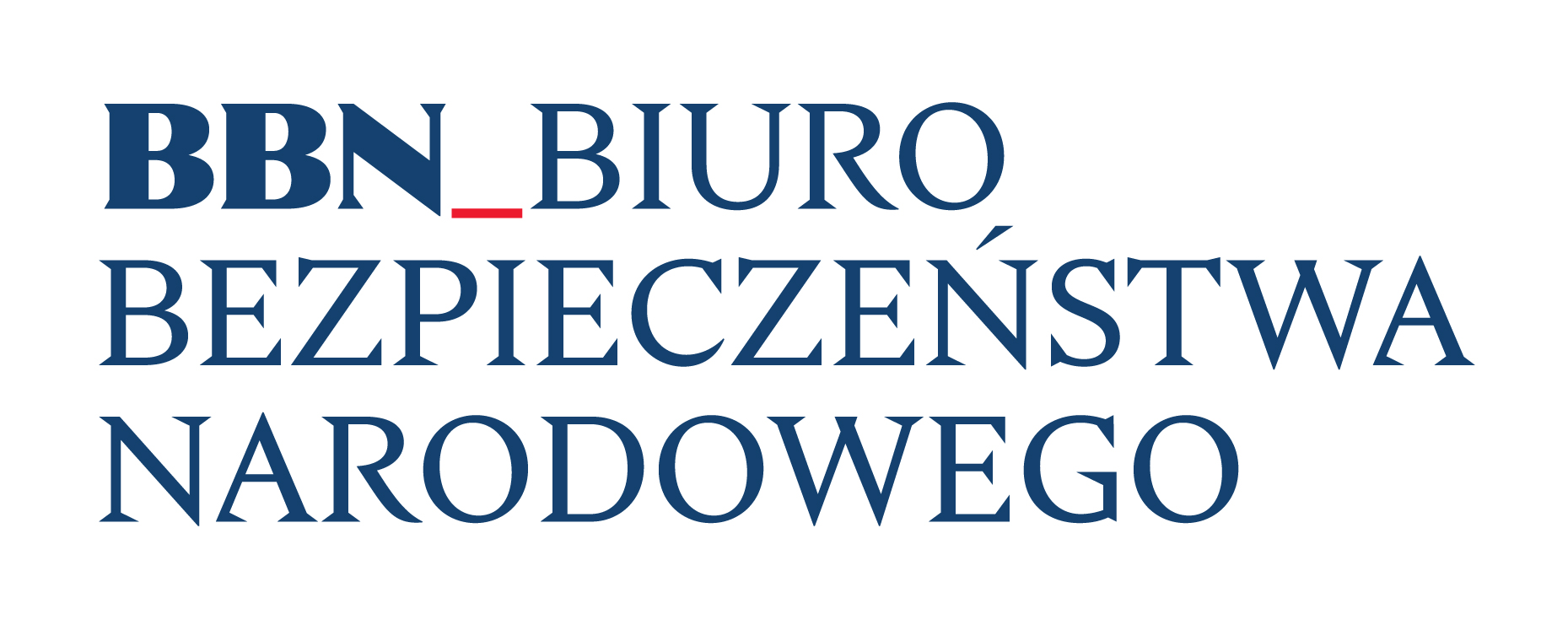

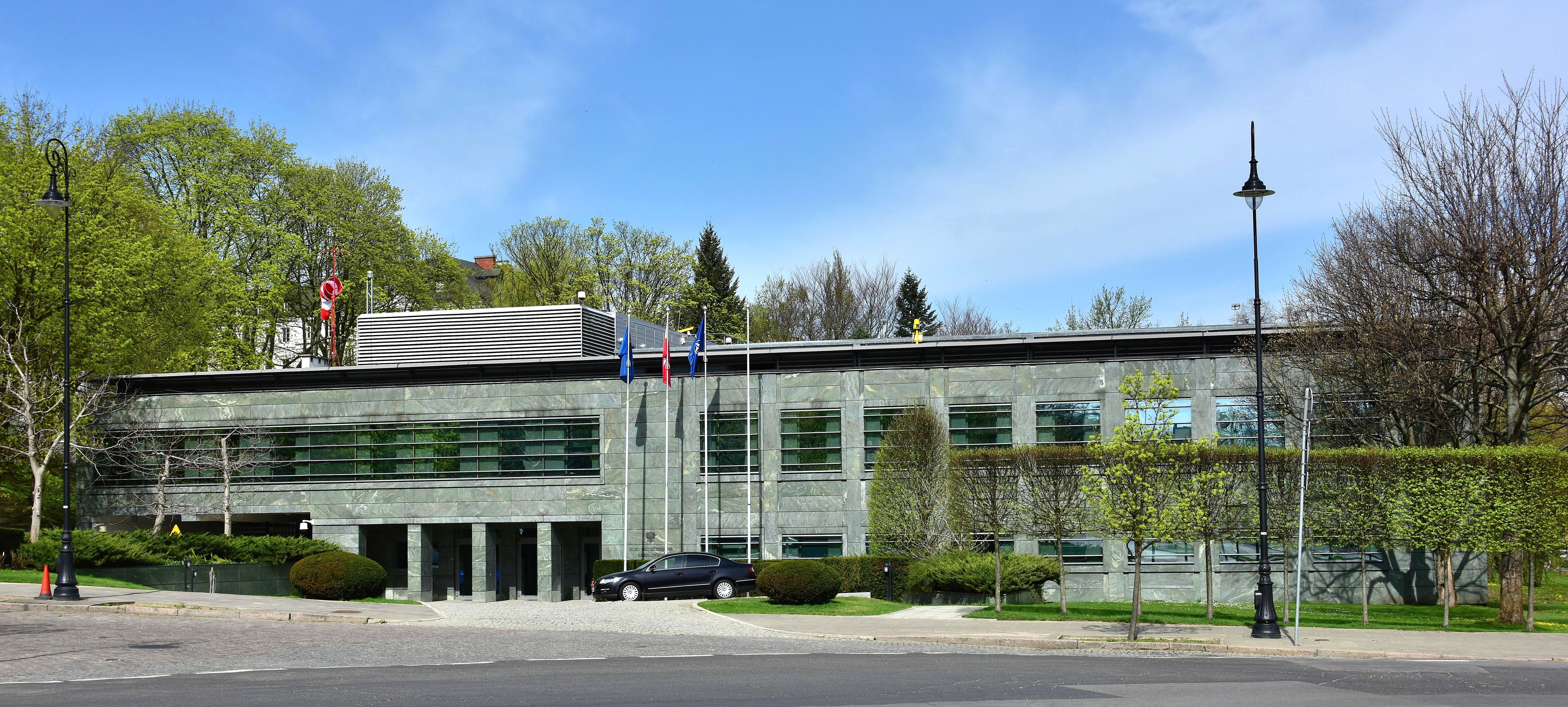
- National Security Bureau's Headquarters in Warsaw

Agency overview
- Formed: 31 January 1991
- Preceding agency: Ministry of the State for the National Security
- Headquarters: ul. Karowa 10, Warsaw, Poland; 52°14′37″N 21°1′8″E
- Agency executive: Bartosz Grodecki, Head of BBN, Secretary of State
- Website: en.bbn.gov.pl

National Security Bureau (Polish: Biuro Bezpieczeństwa Narodowego [ˈbju.rɔ bɛs.pjɛˈt͡ʂɛɲ.stfa na.rɔ.dɔˈvɛ.ɡɔ], BBN) is a Polish government agency executing the tasks given by the President of the Republic of Poland regarding national security. The Bureau serves as the organizational support to the National Security Council.

The Chief of the National Security Bureau (Polish: Szef Biura Bezpieczeństwa Narodowego) answers to the President. Shortly after the creation of NSB (1991) it was a part of Office of the President of the Republic of Poland in place of the Ministry of State for the National Security, which it succeeded.

== Heads of the National Security Bureau ==
l.p	Portrait	Name	Term of office	
1.		Jerzy Milewski	8 February 1991	13 June 1994
2.		Henryk Goryszewski	14 June 1994	22 December 1995
3.		Jerzy Milewski	3 January 1996	10 February 1997
4.		Marek Siwiec	19 February 1997	17 June 2004
-		Tadeusz Bałachowicz	18 June 2004	28 February 2005
5.		Jerzy Bahr	1 March 2005	22 December 2005
-		Ryszard Łukasik	22 December 2005	13 January 2006
-		Andrzej Urbański	13 January 2006	24 August 2006
6.		Władysław Stasiak	24 August 2006	8 August 2007
-		Roman Polko	8 August 2007	19 November 2007
7.		Władysław Stasiak	19 November 2007	15 January 2009
8.		Aleksander Szczygło	15 January 2009	10 April 2010
-		Zbigniew Nowek	10 April 2010	13 April 2010
9.		Stanisław Koziej	13 April 2010	6 August 2015
10.		Paweł Soloch	6 August 2015	10 October 2022
11.		Jacek Siewiera	10 October 2022	3 February 2025
12.		Dariusz Łukowski	3 February 2025	6 August 2025
13.		Sławomir Cenckiewicz	6 August 2025	23 April 2026
-		Andrzej Kowalski	23 April 2026	8 May 2026
14.		Bartosz Grodecki	8 May 2026	present
