= Rafał Leśkiewicz =

Polish historian

Dr Rafał Leśkiewicz
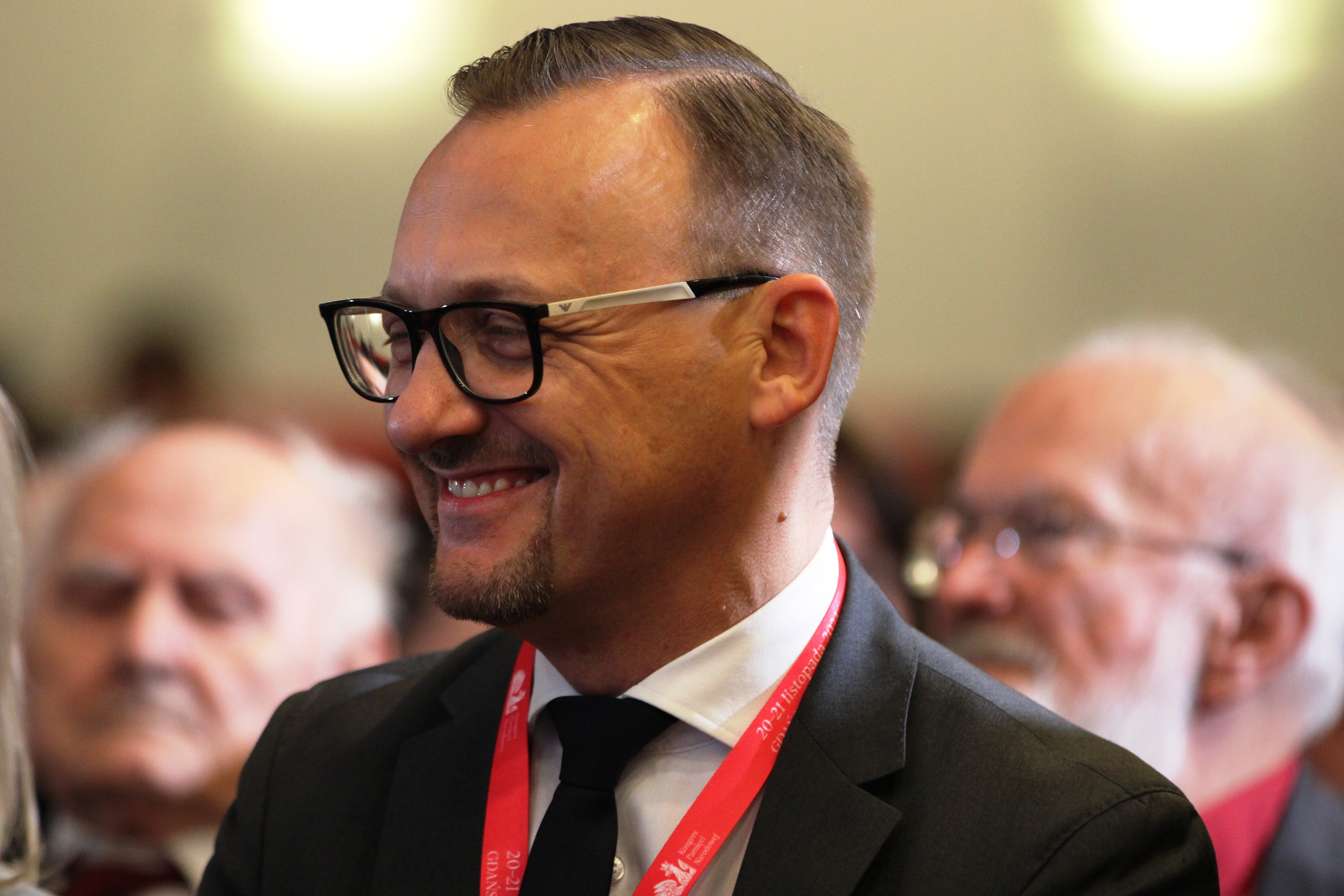
- Rafał Leśkiewicz

Spokesperson for the President of Poland
- Incumbent
- Assumed office 2025
- Preceded by: Diana Głownia

Spokesperson for the Institute of National Remembrance
- In office 2021–2025
- Preceded by: Andrzej Arseniuk
- Succeeded by: Rafał Kościański

Personal details
- Born: 1977 (age 48–49)
- Profession: Historian

Rafał Leśkiewicz (born 1977) is a Polish historian and manager. He was the spokesperson for the Institute of National Remembrance (IPN). Since 2025, he has served as spokesperson for the President of the Republic of Poland.

== Career ==
Leśkiewicz studied history at the University of Warmia and Mazury in Olsztyn, where he earned a PhD in 2008.

He also obtained post-graduate diplomas from the Poznań University of Economics and Business, the SGH Warsaw School of Economics and the Warsaw University of Technology.

Leśkiewicz has worked at the Institute of National Remembrance since 2001, first as a junior archivist and subsequently as the head of its archives from 2010 to 2016.

He was the Deputy Director of the IPN Historical Research Bureau from 2016 to 2019 and again from 2019 to 2021. He led the Institute's Information Technology Department from 2017 to 2019. In 2019, he was also named the IPN President's delegate for a study on the German occupation terror in Poland during World War II.

Leśkiewicz was appointed head of the Central IT Centre by the Minister of Digital Affairs in 2016, and later served as an expert in the Ministry until 2020. Since then, he has been employed in the Executive Office of Mateusz Morawiecki, Prime Minister of Poland.

Since 2019, he's been the editor-in-chief of IPN's Next Stop History, a website that focuses on the history of the 20th century Poland.

He was the spokesperson for the Institute of National Remembrance (IPN). Since 2025, he has served as spokesperson for the President of Poland, and since 2026 as Secretary of State in the Chancellery of the President of the Republic of Poland.

Leśkiewicz is the author, co-author, or editor of over 150 scientific and popular science papers, including numerous media appearances in print and online – all dealing either with the late modern period and contemporary history, or with archival and computer studies.

== Honors ==
In 2009, he was awarded the Bronze Cross of Merit of the Republic of Poland.

In 2015, the Gold Cross of Merit followed.

In 2020, Leśkiewicz was awarded the Medal of the 100th Anniversary of Regaining Independence (Medal Stulecia Odzyskanej Niepodległości).
