= Joanna Tokarska-Bakir =

Polish cultural anthropologist, professor

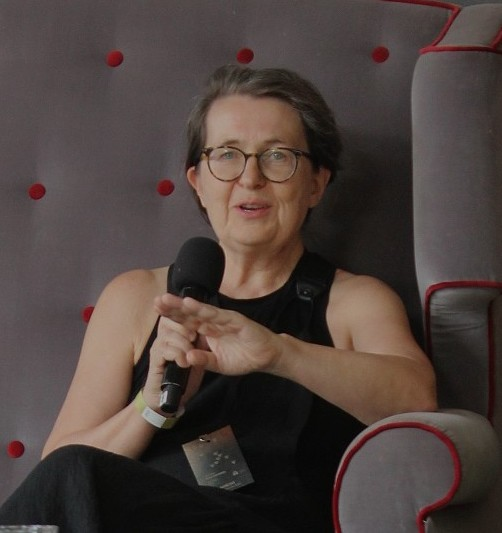
- Tokarska-Bakir in 2025
- Born: 17 October 1958 (age 67)
- Education: University of Warsaw
- Awards: Cross of Merit
- Scientific career
- Fields: Ethnology, blood libel, Holocaust
- Workplaces: Polish Academy of Sciences

Joanna Sabina Tokarska-Bakir (born 1958) is a Polish cultural anthropologist, literary scholar, and religious studies scholar. She is a full professor and chair of the ethnic and national relations study at the Polish Academy of Sciences's Institute of Slavic Studies. She specializes in blood libel, historical anthropology and in particular violence, and Holocaust ethnography.

== Career ==
In 1983, Tokarska-Bakir received her MA in Ethnology from the University of Warsaw in 1983, and her doctorate in 1993 also from Warsaw. She completed her habilitation in Warsaw in 2001. In 2010 she was appointed full professor.

== Research and writing ==
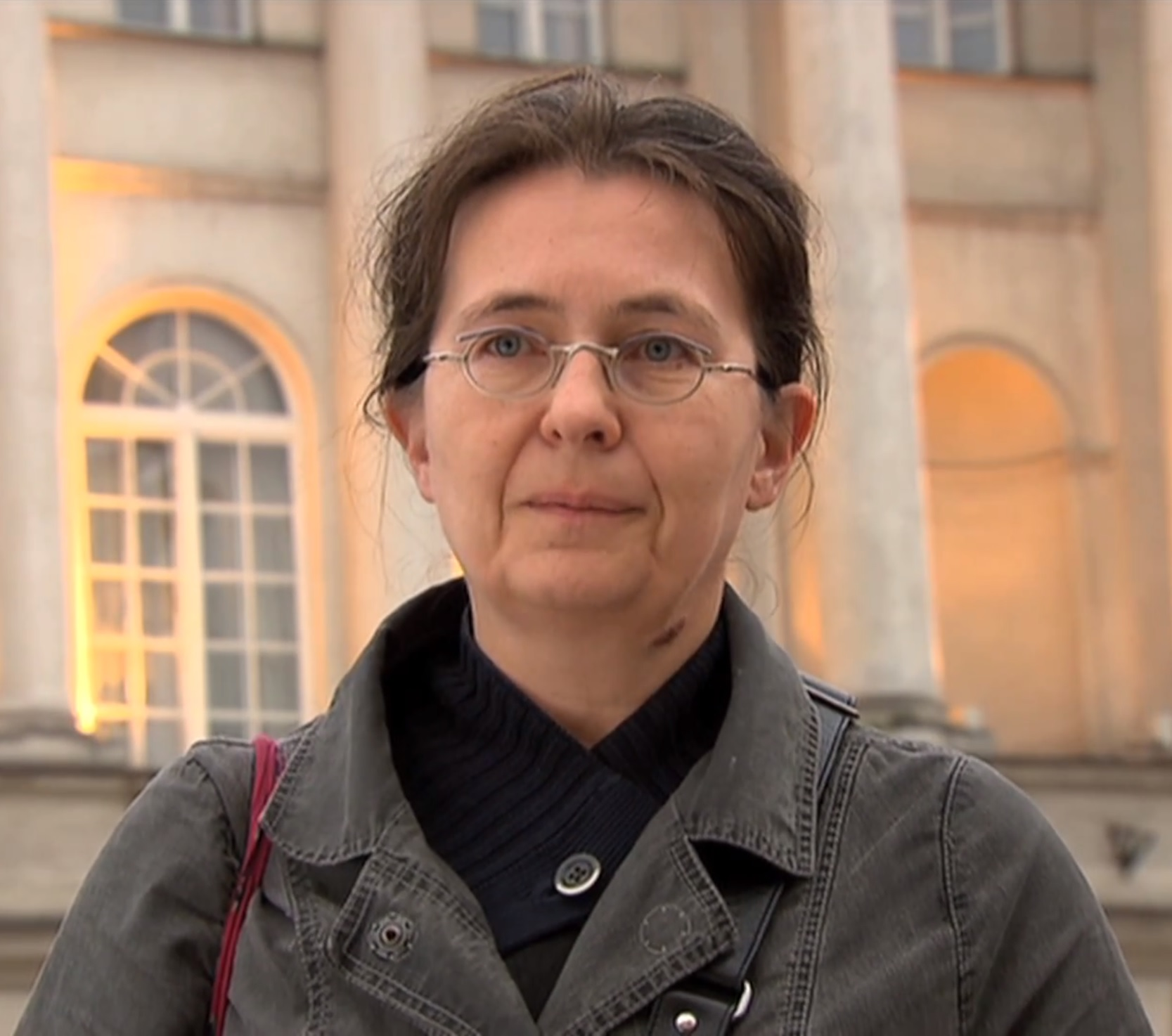
Tokarska-Bakir in 2013

In Żydzi u Kolberga, Tokarska-Bakir rejects the view that pre-modern folk antisemitism was benign, asserting that these notions assigned to Jews a "dangerous place" which could lead to destruction at any moment. Tokarska-Bakir argued that this "common sense" persists to the modern-day with explosions of hatred being latent phenomena.

In her essay Poland as the sick man of Europe?, she describes the public debate in Poland following the publication of Jan T. Gross's Neighbors: The Destruction of the Jewish Community in Jedwabne, Poland on the Jedwabne pogrom as the revelation of what had been in effect a "public secret" in Poland since the massacre took place. Tokarska-Bakir's describes the debate as "an explosion of post-traumatic psychosis" in which some historians attempted to maintain Poland's identity as a victim and not as a perpetrator by discrediting the research. Tokarska-Bakir asserts that empathy is the needed cure to "dispel the stupor" and "impart some critical awareness" in regards to the Jedwabne debate.

Her 2008 study Legends about blood: The anthropology of prejudice is about folk legends in southeastern Poland that justified antisemitism as well as their form in modern society.

== Awards ==
- In 2014, she received a Cross of Merit (Poland).
- In 2007, she was awarded the Jan Karski & Pola Nirenska prize from the YIVO institute.
