= Grzegorz Motyka =

Polish historian (born 1967)

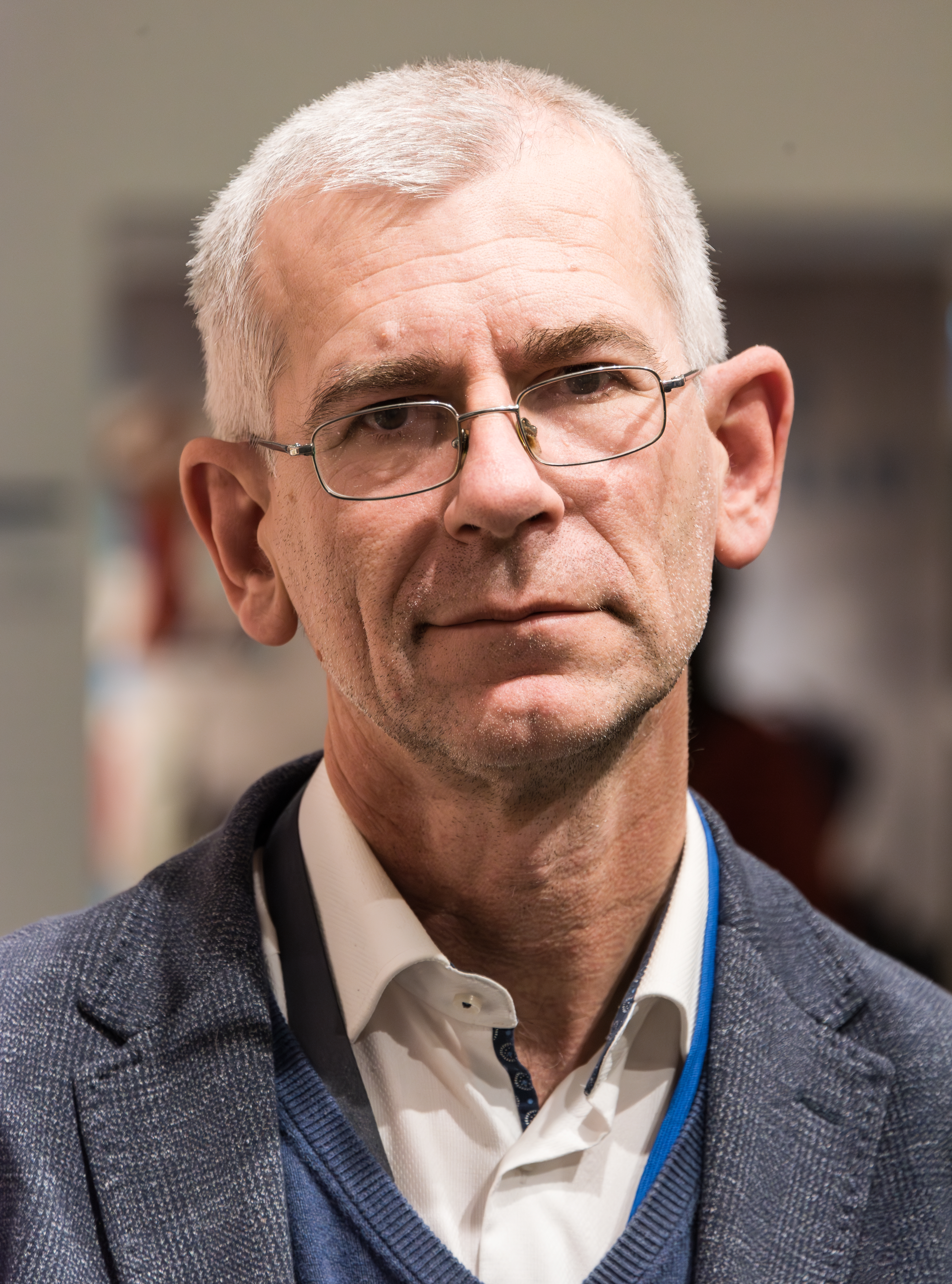
- Born: 1967 (age 58–59); Ośnica
- Education: Jagiellonian University
- Known for: Od rzezi wołyńskiej do akcji "Wisła" (From Vohlynian slaughter to Operation Vistula)

Grzegorz Motyka (born 29 January 1967 in Ośnica) is a Polish historian and author specializing in the history of Poland–Ukraine relations. Since 1992 he served at the Institute of Political Studies of the Polish Academy of Sciences and at the Institute of National Remembrance.

Motyka graduated from the history department at the John Paul II Catholic University of Lublin in 1992. Motyka was awarded the postgraduate academic degree of Doctor of Philosophy in 1998. The title of his dissertation was Walki polsko-ukraińskie na ziemiach dzisiejszej Polski w latach 1943–1948 (the Polish-Ukrainian war on the territory of present day Poland in 1943–48). Motyka habilitated his degree in 2007.

After 1992 he became a researcher in the Polish Academy of Sciences. He also worked at the Public Education Office of the Institute of National Remembrance (until 2007). He worked as adjunct at the Faculty of Ukrainian Studies in the Jagiellonian University, but also as Associate professor of the Pułtusk Academy of Humanities. In 2011 he was selected by the Senate of Poland – the upper house of the Polish parliament – to the Board of Directors of IPN, in which he served until June 16, 2016. On June 22, 2023, he was appointed this position again. In 2017 he received the title of professor at the Institute of the Polish Academy of Sciences.

== Selected works ==
- Pany i rezuny. Współpraca AK-WiN i UPA 1945–1947, Warszawa 1997 (with Rafał Wnuk)
- Tak było w Bieszczadach. Walki polsko-ukraińskie w Polsce 1943–1948, Warszawa 1998
- Antypolska Akcja OUN-UPA 1943–1944. Fakty i interpretacje, ed. Grzegorz Motyka, Dariusz Libionka, IPN 2002
- Służby Bezpieczeństwa Polski i Czechosłowacji wobec Ukraińców 1945–1989, Warszawa 2005 (ed. and coauthor)
- Ukraińska partyzantka 1942–1960, Warszawa 2006. ISBN 9788388490583
- "W kręgu "Łun w Bieszczadach", Warszawa 2009
- Od rzezi wołyńskiej do akcji "Wisła". Konflikt polsko-ukraiński 1943–1947 Wydawnictwo Literackie, 2011. ISBN 978-83-08-04576-3.
- Cień Kłyma Sawura. Polsko-ukraiński konflikt pamięci, Wydawnictwo Oskar, 2013.
- Na Białych Polaków obława. Wojska NKWD w walce z polskim podziemiem 1944–1953, Wydawnictwo Literackie, Kraków 2014, ISBN 978-83-08-05393-5.
- Wołyń '43. Ludobójcza czystka – fakty, analogie, polityka historyczna [Volhynia '43. Genocidal cleansing – facts, analogies, historical policy] (in Polish). Kraków: Wydawnictwo Literackie. 2016. ISBN 978-83-08-06207-4.
- Obywatel "Igła" – krawiec ze Skaryszewa. Analiza mikrohistoryczna rewolucji wyklętych [Citizen “Igła” – a tailor from Skaryszew. A microhistorical analysis of the cursed revolution] (in Polish). Warszawa: Instytut Studiów Politycznych PAN. 2018. ISBN 978-83-65972-48-4.
- With Stryjkiem, Tomaszem; Zajączkowskim, Mariuszem (2020). Międzynarodowe aspekty akcji "Wisła" [International aspects of Operation Vistula] (in Polish). Warszawa: Instytut Studiów Politycznych PAN. ISBN 978-83-65972-91-0.
- Akcja "Wisła" '47. Komunistyczna czystka etniczna [Operation Vistula '47. Communist ethnic cleansing] (in Polish). Kraków: Wydawnictwo Literackie. 2023. ISBN 978-83-08-08057-3.,
- From the Volhynian Massacre to Operation Vistula: The Polish-Ukrainian Conflict 1943–1947. Paderborn: Brill Schöningh. 2023. doi:10.30965/9783657795376. ISBN 978-3506795373.

== Accolades ==
In October 2025 he received Jerzy Turowicz Award.
