= Rafał Wnuk =

Polish historian

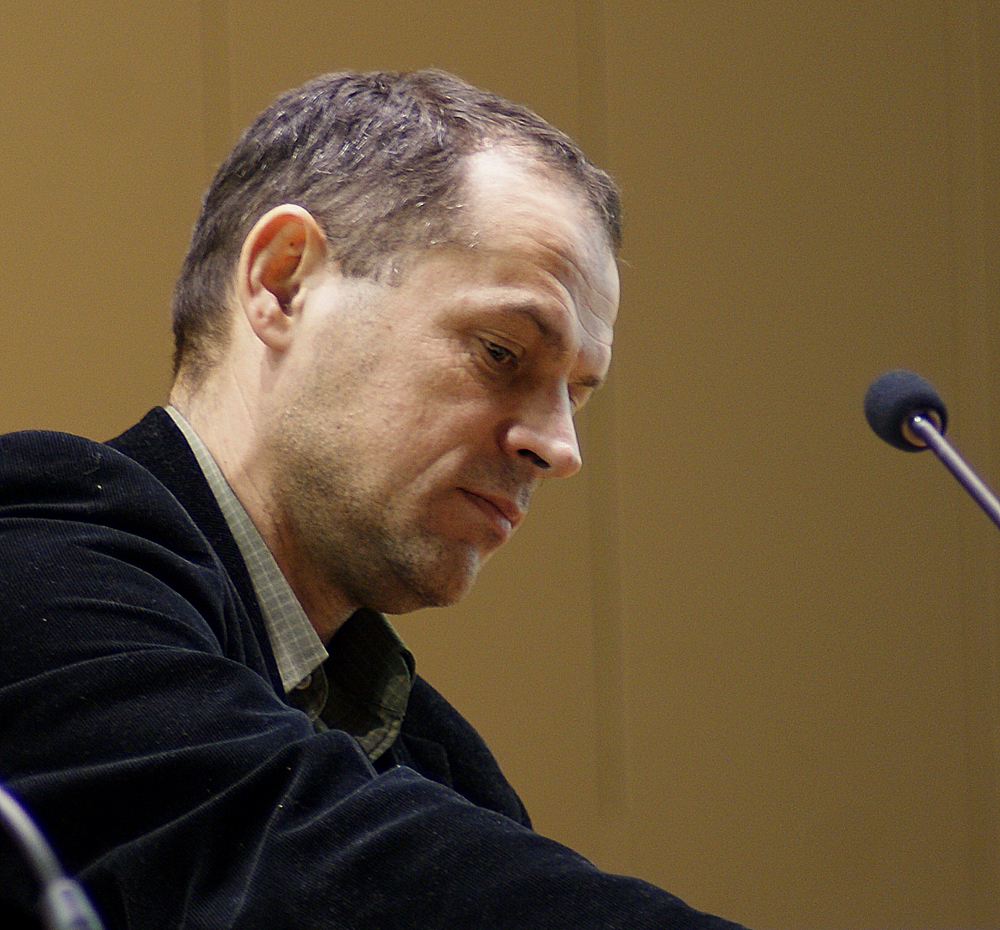
- Born: May 22, 1967 (age 59); Zamość
- Occupations: Academic, Institute of History of the Polish Academy of Sciences; Director, Museum of the Second World War
- Known for: World War II research
- Title: professor
- Board member of: Institute of National Remembrance (IPN)

Academic work
- Main interests: Modern Eastern-European history
- Notable works: Za pierwszego Sowieta. Polska konspiracja na Kresach Wschodnich II Rzeczypospolitej

Rafał Wnuk (born 22 May 1967, in Zamość) is a Polish historian, editor of several historical periodicals, employee of the Institute of History of the Polish Academy of Sciences and of the Polish Institute of National Remembrance (IPN). Wnuk was a student of the Polish historian Tomasz Strzembosz.

== Works ==
Wnuk specializes in Polish-Ukrainian relations during World War II as well as in the history of Polish resistance (primarily of Armia Krajowa) in the former eastern Polish regions (Kresy), as well as the history of totalitarian systems. Joanna Michlic commends him as one of the most eminent historians studying the Polish anti-Communist underground.

He was the author of one of the most important books on the Polish underground in the Lublin region in 2000. Together with Sławomir Poleszak, Agnieszka Jaczyńska and Magdalena Śladecka he is the editor of "The Atlas of the Polish Independent Underground 1944-1956" (Atlas Polskiego Podziemia Niepodległościowego 1944–1956) published in 2007 by the IPN. Wnuk works at the Museum of the Second World War in Gdańsk, of which he has been the director since April 2024, and the Catholic University of Lublin.

== Books ==
- Konspiracja akowska i poakowska na Zamojszczyźnie od lipca 1945 do 1956 roku (lit. 'Home Army and post-Home Army underground in the Zamość region from July 1945 to 1956'), Lublin 1993;
- Together with Grzegorz Motyka: Pany i Rezuny. Współpraca AK-WiN i UPA 1945–1947 (lit. 'Pans and Rezuns. Cooperation of the AK-WiN and the UPA 1945–1947'), Warsaw 1997;
- Okręg Lublin AK-DSZ-WiN 1944–1947, Warsaw 2000;
- One of the editors of Atlas polskiego podziemia niepodległościowego 1944–1956 (lit. 'Atlas of the Polish independence underground 1944–1956'), Warsaw-Lublin 2007;
- Za pierwszego Sowieta. Polska konspiracja na Kresach Wschodnich II Rzeczypospolitej (wrzesień 1939 – czerwiec 1941) (lit. 'Under the First Soviet. Polish conspiracy in the Eastern Borderlands of the Second Polish Republic (September 1939–June 1941)'), Warsaw 2007;
- Together with Tomasz Strzembosz: Czerwone Bagno. Konspiracja i partyzantka antysowiecka w Augustowskiem wrzesień 1938–czerwiec 1941 (lit. 'Red Swamp. Anti-Soviet conspiracy and partisanship in Augustów region. September 1938–June 1941'), Gdańsk-Warsaw 2009.
- Together with Adam F. Baran, Grzegorz Motyka, Tomasz Stryjek: Wojna po wojnie. Antysowieckie podziemie w Europie Środkowo-Wschodniej w latach 1944-1953 (lit. 'War After War. The anti-Soviet underground in Central and Eastern Europe 1944–1953'), Gdańsk–Warsaw 2012;
- Together with Jan Szkudliński, and Robert Zapart: Tajemnice Blizny. Wywiad Armii Krajowej w walce z rakietami V-2 (lit. 'Secrets of the Blizna. Home Army intelligence in the fight against V-2 rockets', Gdańsk–Warsaw 2012;
- Leśni bracia. Podziemie antykomunistyczne na Litwie, Łotwie i w Estonii 1944–1956 (lit. 'Forest Brothers. Anti-communist underground in Lithuania, Latvia and Estonia 1944–1956', Warsaw 2018.
