= Jan Żaryn =

Polish historian, professor, and politician (born 1958)

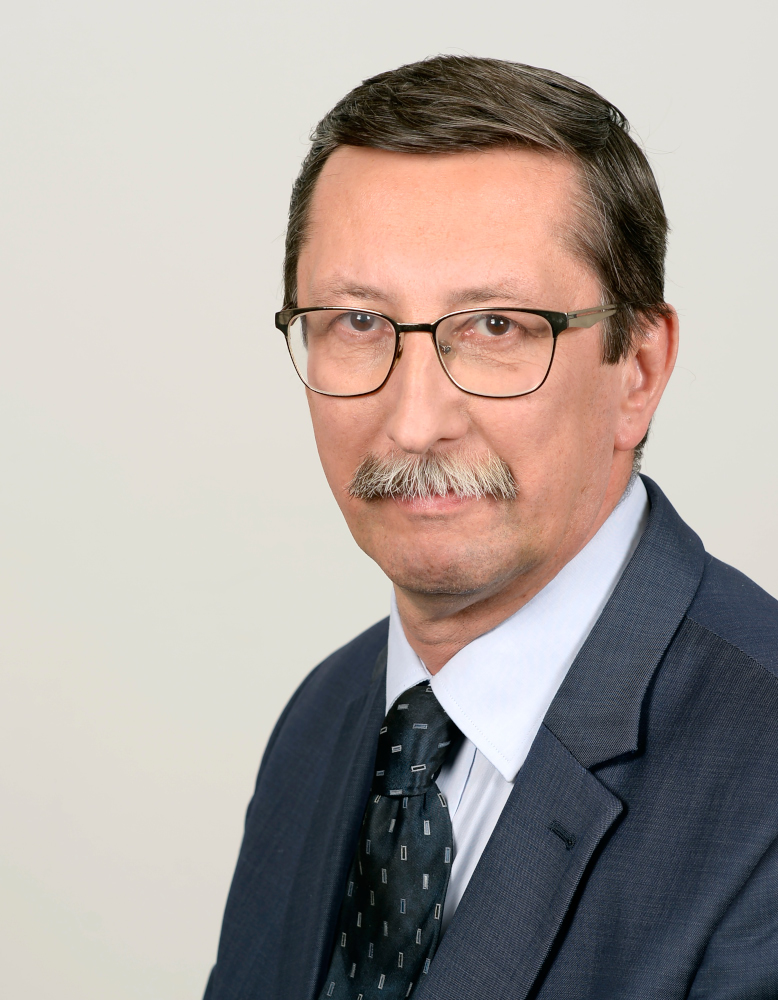
- Jan Żaryn's official Senate portrait, 2015

Senator for the 40th district
- In office 12 November 2015 – 11 November 2019
- Preceded by: Anna Aksamit
- Succeeded by: Jolanta Hibner

Personal details
- Born: Jan Krzysztof Żaryn; 13 March 1958 (age 68) Warsaw, Poland
- Party: Independent (Note: Affiliated with Law and Justice party, which gives him endorsement during elections)
- Spouse: Małgorzata Żaryn
- Children: 3
- Parent(s): Stanisław Żaryn, Aleksandra Żaryn (née Jankowska)
- Education: University of Warsaw (master's degree); Tadeusz Manteuffel Institute of History, Polish Academy of Sciences (PhD, habilitation)
- Occupation: Historian, professor, politician
- Website: janzaryn.pl

Jan Krzysztof Żaryn (born 13 March 1958) is a Polish historian, professor and politician, who was a Senator in the Senate of Poland from 2015 to 2019.

Born in Warsaw into a family of inteligencja, Żaryn studied history at the University of Warsaw in 1979–1984, as well as in an underground education society. As a student, he engaged with anti-Communist movements. After finishing his studies, he taught history in Warsaw high schools and then joined Tadeusz Manteuffel Institute of History of the Polish Academy of Sciences in 1997. Żaryn received a Ph.D. in humanities in history in 1996, and in 2004 earned the habilitated doctorate degree. In 2013, he was awarded the title of Professor of Humanities.

Żaryn has held senior positions in the Polish Institute of National Remembrance and the Institute for Legacy of Polish National Thought. Żaryn specialises in the recent history of Poland and, in particular, the history of the Catholic Church in the 20th century, the history of the National and Christian Democratic camps, Polish-Jewish relations in the 20th century, and the history of post-war Polish emigration. Some of his views and commentaries have sparked controversy.

== Early life ==
Jan Żaryn was born on 13 March 1958 in Warsaw, Żaryn's parents had five children. His father, Stanisław Żaryn, was a prominent architect in post-war Poland, while his mother Aleksandra was a lawyer and a translator. During the war Stanisław fought in the Warsaw Uprising, and both Stanisław and Aleksandra were recognised as Righteous among the Nations for sheltering a Jewish family in their Szeligi estate.

From the age of 6, Żaryn was an altar boy in the church of St. Alexander's Church in Warsaw.

Having finished the XV Narcyza Żmichowska general education liceum in Warsaw in the late 1970s, he then enrolled in the University of Warsaw, participating at the same time at the lectures of the Towarzystwo Kursów Naukowych, an organisation that sought to break the monopoly of education by the state. He also belonged to the Young Poland Movement (Polish: Ruch Młodej Polski), (Note: Not to be confused with the Young Poland artistic current of the late 19th-early 20th century) a group of conservative students opposing the Communist regime, and, additionally, in 1980–1984, to the students' union of the University of Warsaw. At the time, he dismissed the Workers' Defence Committee (KOR) and the Independent Students' Association (NZS) as factions in an internecine fight of the communists, and opined that the only organisation that could be trusted was the Catholic Church; despite that, he cooperated with the anti-Communist opposition and joined the Solidarity movement in 1989.

On 10 November 1982, during martial law in Poland, Jan Żaryn was arrested for one month during a demonstration on the charge of participating in street incidents. In spring 1983, Żaryn was cleared by the District Court of Warsaw of all charges related to the incident.

He finished his master's degree in 1984, specialising in archival science, and also passed pedagogy courses a year later. Żaryn later taught in various schools in Warsaw until 1990.

In 1985, together with his wife Małgorzata, he became associated with the community of the Christian Culture Study at the Church of St. Trinity in Warsaw. In 1989, he has co-founded the Catholic Tutors' Association, and has presided over the Warsaw branch of the organisation in the 1990s.

== Scholarly career ==
In the mid-1990s, Żaryn continued to pursue his career as a historian. In 1996, he defended his doctoral thesis in the Tadeusz Manteuffel Institute of History of the Polish Academy of Sciences, which he joined the following year. He also wrote his habilitation thesis there in 2004 before quitting the institute two years later.

In 2000, Żaryn became employed in the Bureau of Public Education of the Institute of National Remembrance (IPN), which he directed from January 2006 until April 2009. He was then appointed as an advisor to the director of the institute, Janusz Kurtyka.

He sat on scientific boards of some historical societies, such as the Society of Soldiers of the National Armed Forces and the Committee for Commemoration of Poles Rescuing Jews (which he heads since 2004). Żaryn became a co-founder of the Foundation of the "Cursed Soldiers" and a member of the program council of the Foundation Work of the New Millennium, among others. Since 2018, Żaryn is a member of the board of the Museum of the Second World War in Gdańsk, while two years later, he was appointed to that of the Museum of the Cursed Soldiers and Political Prisoners of People's Republic of Poland. Also since 2020, he heads the Roman Dmowski and Ignacy Jan Paderewski Institute for Legacy of Polish National Thought, a newly created institute by the Polish Ministry of Culture.

Żaryn is a lecturer at the Cardinal Stefan Wyszyński University since 2000, where serves as director of the Department of the History of the Church; he also used to work at the University of Warsaw in 2003–2006.

== Publishing ==
Żaryn has published in conservative and Catholic media outlets, such as Przegląd Katolicki, Ład, Gazeta Niedzielna, Gazeta Polska, Gazeta Polska Codziennie, Więź, W Sieci, WPolityce.pl, and Arcana. In the late 1990s, he has also been the editor-in-chief of Szaniec Chrobrego, a publication for the veterans of the National Armed Forces. Since 2012, he presided over the editorial board of Na poważnie, a historical monthly magazine, which was reorganised as W Sieci Historii the following year, where he retained his position as editor-in-chief.

== Electoral career ==
In 1993, Żaryn ran for a seat in the Polish Sejm. In 2011, 2015, and 2019 for the Senate winning a seat in 2015. In 2011, he headed an organization Polska Jest Najważniejsza, a social committee supporting Jarosław Kaczyński in the presidential election.

== Historical and political views ==
=== Polish-Jewish relations ===
Żaryn argues that the tensions between Jews and other nations in interwar Poland were mostly due to economic reasons.

Żaryn, a co-editor of a two-volume monograph on the Kielce pogrom, has stated that "a significant proportion of Jewish individuals [...] supported the communist authorities or [...] joined their ranks"; he blames those individuals for being part of Communist censorship and propaganda organs, who were "deceitfully [...] silent about Soviet massacres". This, he believes, "intensified anti-Semitic attitudes" that resulted in the Kielce pogrom.

Zaryn has been criticized for these views, which themselves have been associated with antisemitism.

Żaryn has stated that the Germans were directors of the Jedwabne pogrom and also assigned blame to the Volksdeutsche and "outsiders" who came from other villages. Poles, in his opinion, were provoked and oftentimes coerced to participate in pogroms. He added that "even if some of the Polish locals participated in this "spectacle" under duress [...] the majority looked in disgust at what the Germans have done [...]" Żaryn has stated that the current narrative about the Jedwabne events had become a "founding myth" about the "allegedly proven" organized massacres of Jews by Poles, supposedly rooted in inherent Polish anti-Semitism. He has suggested that these stereotypes stem from insufficient documentation of some World War II events in Poland. Consequently, Żaryn has supported the efforts to exhume the bodies of Jedwabne's victims to obtain more evidence.

Żaryn is a vocal critic of Jan Tomasz Gross, and has condemned various books of his, indicating that they "are part of a certain kind of Jewish (mainly testimonial, but also scholarly) literature and historiography that is soaked with deep resentment towards Poland and the Poles".

=== National Radical Camp ===
Żaryn argues that the interwar National Radical Camp (ONR) was not a fascist organization and that its interwar iteration was unlawfully banned. In an ongoing (Note: as of June 2021) court investigation in Kraków, his Institute for Legacy of Polish National Thought submitted an expert opinion which argued against delegalization of the ONR, while two other expert opinions supported banning the organisation. Privately, Żaryn said and wrote that the (old) National Radical Camp had nothing to do with Nazi ideology and "consisted of people believing in the Christian God" and that "if one wants to condemn ONR for its main ideas, then should be all others who have alluded to the concept of corporatism and Christian nationalism, which, therefore [includes] not only nationalists but also prelate Stefan Wyszyński."

== Controversy ==
In the late 1990s, the Polish Information Agency commissioned Żaryn to write a concise history of Poland that could be translated into several languages and distributed at the Polish embassies. However, a public outcry followed when it turned out that Żaryn expressed discredited views on the contemporary history of Poland. For instance, Żaryn argued that the Polish Round Table Agreement had been a sort of conspiracy and that the government of Jan Olszewski had been overthrown in a coup d'état. While the book has been published in Polish, its English translation has been called off.

In 2009, in connection with the radio criticism on awarding the victim status of a person repressed by the communist government to Lech Wałęsa, Żaryn was dismissed from the Public Education Office of the Institute of National Remembrance. Żaryn later reiterated that Lech Wałęsa collaborated with the communist Security Service in the 1970s.

Żaryn has described far right Polish South African Janusz Waluś continuing detention as “the result of personal vengeance from part of the South African elite”.

== Personal life ==
He is married to Małgorzata, whom Jan Żaryn met in high school and who also became a historian. They have three children: Anna, Stanisław and Krzysztof.

== Awards ==
In 2005, Żaryn received the Medal for Merit to Culture – Gloria Artis from the Minister of Culture. In 2009, President Lech Kaczyński bestowed upon Żaryn the Commander's Cross of the Order of Polonia Restituta, for his "extraordinary achievements in documenting and commemorating the truth about the contemporary history of Poland".

== Selected works ==
- Głębokie. Historia i zabytki. Hlybokaye History and monuments. (co-authored with Małgorzata Żaryn), 1992;
- Historia Polski do roku 1795 [History of Poland until 1795]. (co-authored with Alicja Dybkowska), 1995;
- Polskie dzieje od czasów najdawniejszych do współczesności [Polish history from the oldest times to contemporaneity]. (co-authored with Alicja Dybkowska and Małgorzata Żaryn), 1995;
- Stosunki między władzą państwową a Kościołem katolickim w Polsce w latach 1945–1950 (Relations between the government and the Catholic Church in Poland in 1945–1950), doctoral thesis, 1996;
- Polacy wobec przemocy 1944-1956 [Poles' attitude towards violence 1944–1956] (co-authored with Barbara Otwinowska);
- Kościół a władza w Polsce. 1945–1950 [The Church and the government of Poland. 1945–1950], 1997;
- Stolica Apostolska wobec Polski i Polaków w latach 1944–1958 w świetle materiałów ambasady RP przy Watykanie. Wybór dokumentów, [The Holy See's relations with Poland and the Poles in 1944–1958 in light of the materials of the Polish Embassy in Vatican. Selected documents.] 1998;
- Leszek Prorok – człowiek i twórca [Leszek Prorok - personality and creator], 1999;
- Kościół w Polsce w latach przełomu (1953–1958). Relacje ambasadora RP przy Stolicy Apostolskiej [The Church in Poland in the years of change (1953–1958). Accounts of the ambassador of Poland at the Holy See], 2000;
- Dzieje Kościoła katolickiego w Polsce (1944–1989), [The history of the Catholic Church in Poland (1944–1989)]. Habilitation thesis, 2003;
- Kościół w PRL [The Church in the People's Republic of Poland], 2004;
- Wokół pogromu kieleckiego [Around the Kielce pogrom], 2 vol., 2007–2008 (co-edited with Łukasz Kamiński (vol. 1), Andrzej Jankowski and Leszek Bukowski (vol. 2)) – official IPN investigation;
- Kościół, naród, człowiek, czyli opowieść optymistyczna o Polakach w XX wieku [The Church, the people and the person, or an optimistic story about the Poles in the 20th century], 2013;
- Polska na poważnie [Poland seriously], 2013;
- Polacy ratujący Żydów. Historie niezwykłe [Poles rescuing Jews. Unusual stories], 2014, 571 p.;
- Polska pamięć. O historii i polityce historycznej, [Polish remembrance. On history and the politics of memory], 2017;
- Polska wobec zagłady Żydów [Poland in face of the Holocaust], 2019;
- Własna i niepodległa, czyli o Polakach walczących za własną Ojczyznę, [Own and independent, or on Poles fighting for their own Fatherland], 2020.
