= Stanisław Żaryn =

Polish architect (1913 – 1964)

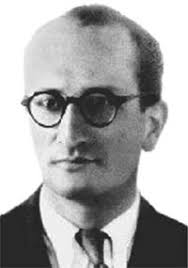
Dr. Stanisław Żaryn, architect

Stanisław Żaryn (5 October 1913 – 15 July 1964) was an architect, urbanist, historian and academic teacher who significantly contributed to the process of the reconstruction of historical Polish architecture after its destruction by the Germans during WWII. He was born in Warsaw to Eugenia and Franciszek Zaryn.

Married to Aleksandra (née Jankowska), the couple had five children: Maria (architect, designer), Anna (physician), Szczepan (journalist), Joanna (teacher) and Jan (professor of history, elected member of the Polish Senate). He died, aged 50, in Inowrocław while leading summer fieldwork research on historical buildings with his Warsaw Polytechnic students.

Stanisław Żaryn should not be confused with his grandson, also Stanisław Żaryn, spokesman for the Minister-Coordinator of Special Services National Security Department of the Chancellery of the Prime Minister of Poland.

== Professional history ==
After graduation from the elite Gimnazjum Towarzystwa Ziemi Mazowieckiej, he entered Poland's leading technical university, Warsaw Polytechnic. As a student at the Faculty of Architecture, he continued his specialization with Professor Oskar Sosnowski, Chair of Polish Architecture. Active in academic life, he was elected president of the Architectural Student Society and published several articles on current architectural issues. He graduated from university with the degree of architect-engineer, where he later received his doctorate.

He finished reserve officers' artillery school in Włodzimierz Wołyński and In WWII served in the 1st Regiment of Horse Artillery (1 DAK). He was gravely wounded which saved him from the prisoner of war death camp in Katyń. During the German occupation he was active in Polish underground resistance movement (first NSZ, National Military Organization and then AK, the Home Army). Together with his wife Aleksandra, her sister Jadwiga and brother in law Władydysław Olizar, he sheltered and protected a Jewish family in their Szeligi estate, near Warsaw. In 1944 he fought in the Warsaw Uprising.

Immediately after the end of WWII, Żaryn formed the Department of Warszawa Historic Conservation at BOS (Office for the Capital Reconstruction) with his architect colleagues. From 1948, he was a historical building inspector and an architect for the city of Warsaw Conservation Office. In 1951 he organized and managed the innovative Research Work Group for Old Warsaw (Komisja Badan Dawnej Warszawy) which included architects, planners, historians, archeologists and artists dedicated to the research, documentation and preservation of Poland's architectural heritage.

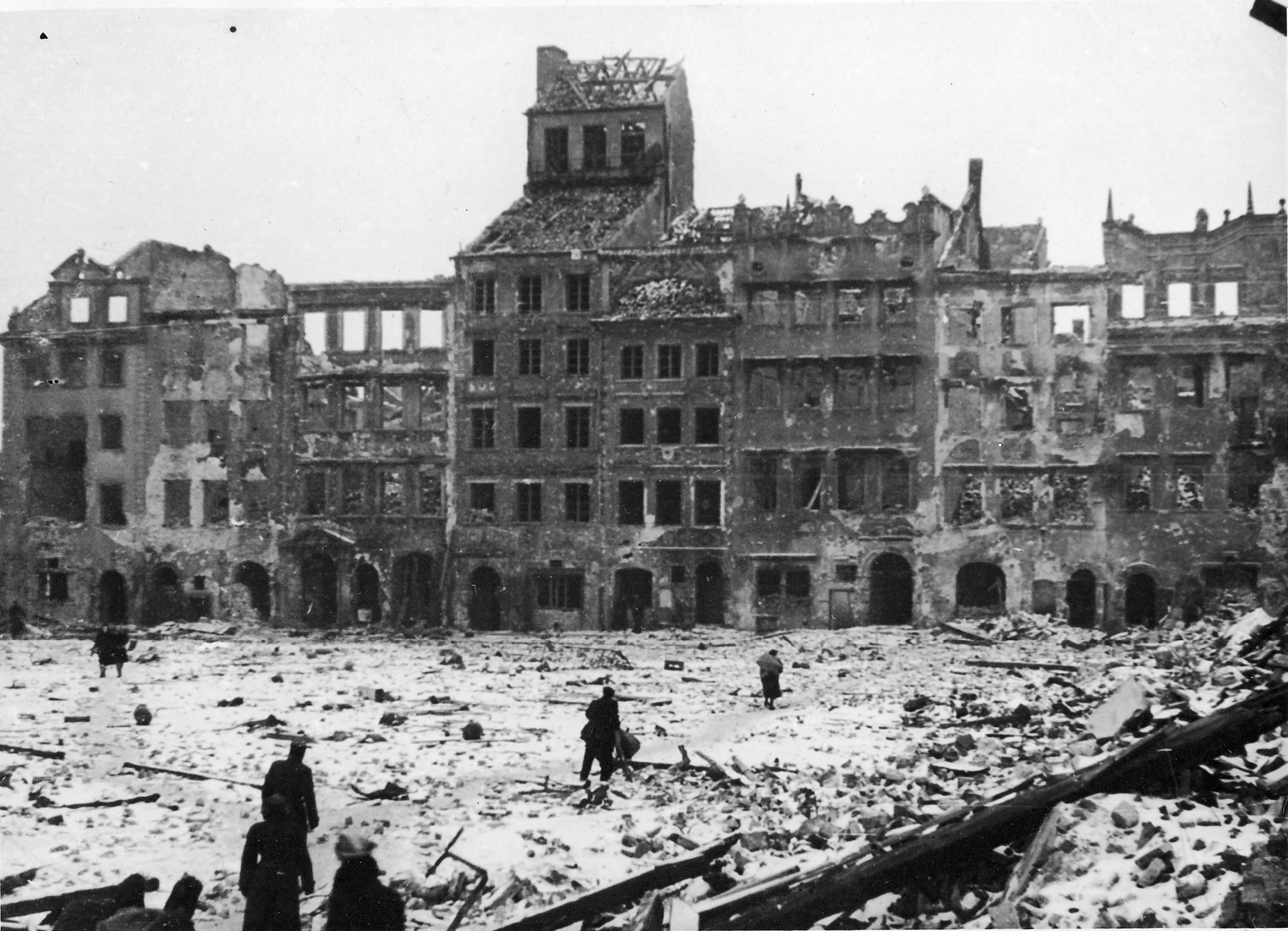
Warsaw Old Town, before reconstruction (1945)

From 1957 to 1959 he served as Head of the Department of Architecture and Urban Planning of the Board of Museums and Monument Protection.

Żaryn was the principal architect in charge of the design and construction of over 40 historical buildings. Among his most recognized works is the Dekert city block of the Warsaw Old Town Square, housing the Archives and the Historical Museum of the City of Warsaw. His contributions included not only architectural projects, but also interior and exhibit designs (see Museum of Warsaw archives). With engineer Stanislaw Hempel, he designed and supervised the reconstruction of the Column of King Sigismund III Vasa, a monument destroyed in 1944 by the Germans. In 1980 the Historic Centre of Warsaw was recognized by UNESCO as a World Heritage Site. Despite political difficulties during the Communist regime, he worked closely with church organizations on the restoration and rebuilding of several religious heritage buildings including fragments and details of Warsaw Cathedral.

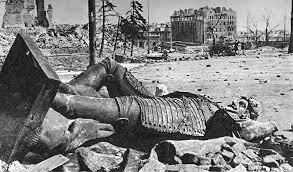
King Sigismund's Column before reconstruction, 1945

Żaryn was involved in several projects outside of Warsaw: Sandomierz Castle, churches in Bolimów, Łomża, Poznań Cathedral, and historic townhouses in Jelenia Góra, Płock, Brzeg. He authored numerous articles and books on the history of architecture, conservation and reconstruction, focussing on building heritage and participated in many public lectures and radio interviews actively promoting the conservation of Polish building heritage. During this period, he also taught at the P.W. Faculty of Architecture with professor Jan Zachwatowicz, chair of Polish Architecture, and Professor Piotr Biegański. From 1945 he was a lecturer and then adjunct professor until his death in 1964. In his teaching, Żaryn passed on to the next generation of architects his extensive knowledge in the field of postwar reconstruction.

== Publications ==
- O Związku Słuchaczów Architektury P.W., Architektura i Budownictwo, pp. 122–123, 1935 Warszawa
- O Związku Słuchaczów Architektury P.W., Kurier Warszawski, CXVI, 1936 Warszawa
- Professor Czesław Przybylski (Wspomnienia Pośmiertne), Życie Techniczne, 1936 Warszawa
- O Noakowskim-(praca zbiorowa), Łowicz pp. 43–44, 1938
- Kamienica Staromiejska, Stolica #30, 1953 Warszawa
- Kamienica Pod Murzynkiem, Stolica #31, 1953 Warszawa
- Ratusz Staromiejski, Ochrona Zabytków 1953, nr. 2–3 p. 107
- Szkice Staromiejskie -(praca zbiorowa) Komisja Badań Dawnej Warszawy, SZTUKA 1955
- Szkice Nowomiejskie -(praca zbiorowa) Komisja Badań Dawnej Warszawy, SZTUKA 1961
- With J. Rutkowska: Wnętrza Kamienicy Barokowej, Instytut Historii PAN 1960, Historia Polski, pp. 177–197
- Dom Gotycki przy ul. Brzozowej nr.5 w Warszawie, Kwartalnik Architektury i Urbanistyki VIII, 1963, pp. 255–262
- Kamienica Warszawy XV i XVI wieku (Warsaw Town house 15th and 16th century), Kwartalnik Architektury i Urbanistyki VIII, 1963, pp. 103–126
- S. Żaryn ed. "Mały Przewodnik po Warszawie"-(praca zbiorowa) Komisja Badań Dawnej Warszawy, Sport i Turystyka 1963
- Dlaczego Chronimy Zabytki, ARKADY Warszawa 1966
- Trzynaście Kamienic Staromiejskich (Thirteen Townhouses of Warsaw Old Town), PWN 1972

== Work on public display ==
- Muzeum Historyczne m. st. Warszawy, Rynek Starego Miasta
- Centrum Interpretacji Zabytku, Ul. Brzozowa 11/13, Warszawa

== Decorations and awards ==
- Polish People's Republic, Golden Honorary Medal "Merit for the City of Warsaw"
- Polish Silver Cross of Merit
- 10th anniversary of PRL Medal
- Awarded Polish Government State Prize (2nd degree)
- Memorial plaque in recognition of his contribution, the courtyard of Warsaw Historical Museum.
- Awarded Israeli Yad Vashem Medal, Righteous Among the Nations, 1993 (posthumously)
- Named street in Warsaw (Old Mokotów), in his honour, 2008 (posthumously)

== Bibliography ==
- Bieniecki, Zdzisław. "Biografia prac inż. arch. Stanisława Żaryna", Ochrona Zabytków 17/4/1967 p. 64-65
- Majewski, Jerzy S. "Skąd się Wzięły Rzeczy w Muzeum", Gazeta Wyborcza 12/2017 Warszawa
- Muzeum Warszawy. Exhibition Catalogue "Rzeczy Warszawskie". 2017.
- PWN 1982. "Warszawskie Stare Miasto z Dziejów Odbudowy", Warszawa
- Szwankowska, Hanna. "Zbiory Komisji Badań Dawnej Warszawy", Muzeum Historii Polski 1997
- Szwankowska, Hanna, Żaryn, Aleksandra. "Stanisław Żaryn, Konserwator Zabytków Warszawy", catalog for exhibition 1981 Muzeum Historyczne Warszawy
- TONZ 2000. "Kalendarz Miłośnika Zabytków 2001." Warszawa
- TONZ 2002. "Stanisław Żaryn w Służbie Zabytków Warszawy", Warszawa
- "Żaryn Stanisław". Internetowa encyklopedia PWN.
- Żaryn, Stanisław (2002). Ptaszyńscy, Danuta (ed.). Stanisław Żaryn w służbie zabytków Warszawy (in Polish). Towarzystwo Opieki nad Zabytkami. ISBN 83-88372-21-1.
