= Adam Leszczyński =

Polish historian and journalist

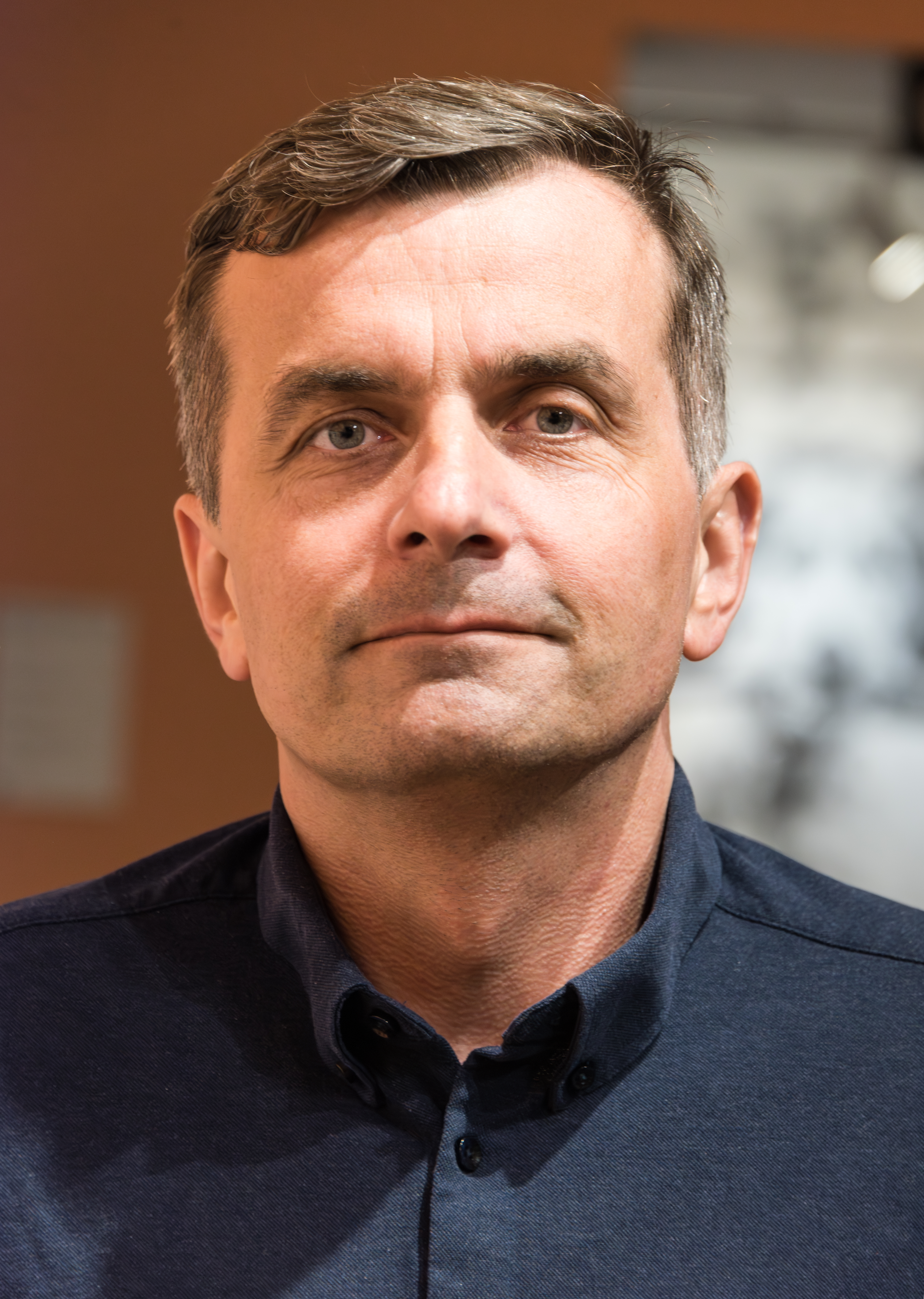
- Adam Leszczyński, 2026
- Born: Adam Janusz Leszczyński; November 26, 1975 (age 50); Warsaw, Warsaw Capital Voivodeship, Polish People's Republic
- Occupations: Historian and journalist
- Known for: Founder of OKO.press
- Board member of: Narutowicz Institute
- Spouse: Zofia Smełka-Leszczyńska

Academic background
- Education: University of Warsaw
- Thesis: NSZZ „Solidarność” w wybranych ośrodkach. Analiza lokalnej dynamiki ruchu w latach 1980–1981 (2006)
- Doctoral advisor: Marcin Kula

Academic work
- Discipline: History
- Sub-discipline: People's history
- Institutions: SWPS University
- Main interests: Serfdom in Poland
- Notable works: Ludowa historia Polski
- Website: Adam Leszczynski on Instagram

Adam Janusz Leszczyński (born 26 November 1975, Warsaw) is a Polish historian and journalist, associate professor at the Institute for Political Studies of the Polish Academy of Sciences.

== Works ==
- Skok w nowoczesność: Polityka wzrostu w krajach peryferyjnych 1943–1980 (The leap in modernity: Politics of growth in peripheral countries 1943–1980). Warszawa: Instytut Studiów Politycznych PAN. Introduction by Zygmunt Bauman
- Leszczyński, Adam (2017). No dno po prostu jest Polska (in Polish). Virtualo. ISBN 978-83-280-4937-6.
- Leszczyński, Adam (2020). Ludowa historia Polski (in Polish). Wydawnictwo W.A.B.
- Leszczyński, Adam (2023). Obrońcy pańszczyzny (in Polish). Wydawnictwo Krytyki Politycznej. ISBN 978-8367075787.
