= Museum of the Second World War =

Coordinates: 54°21′21″N 18°39′38″E

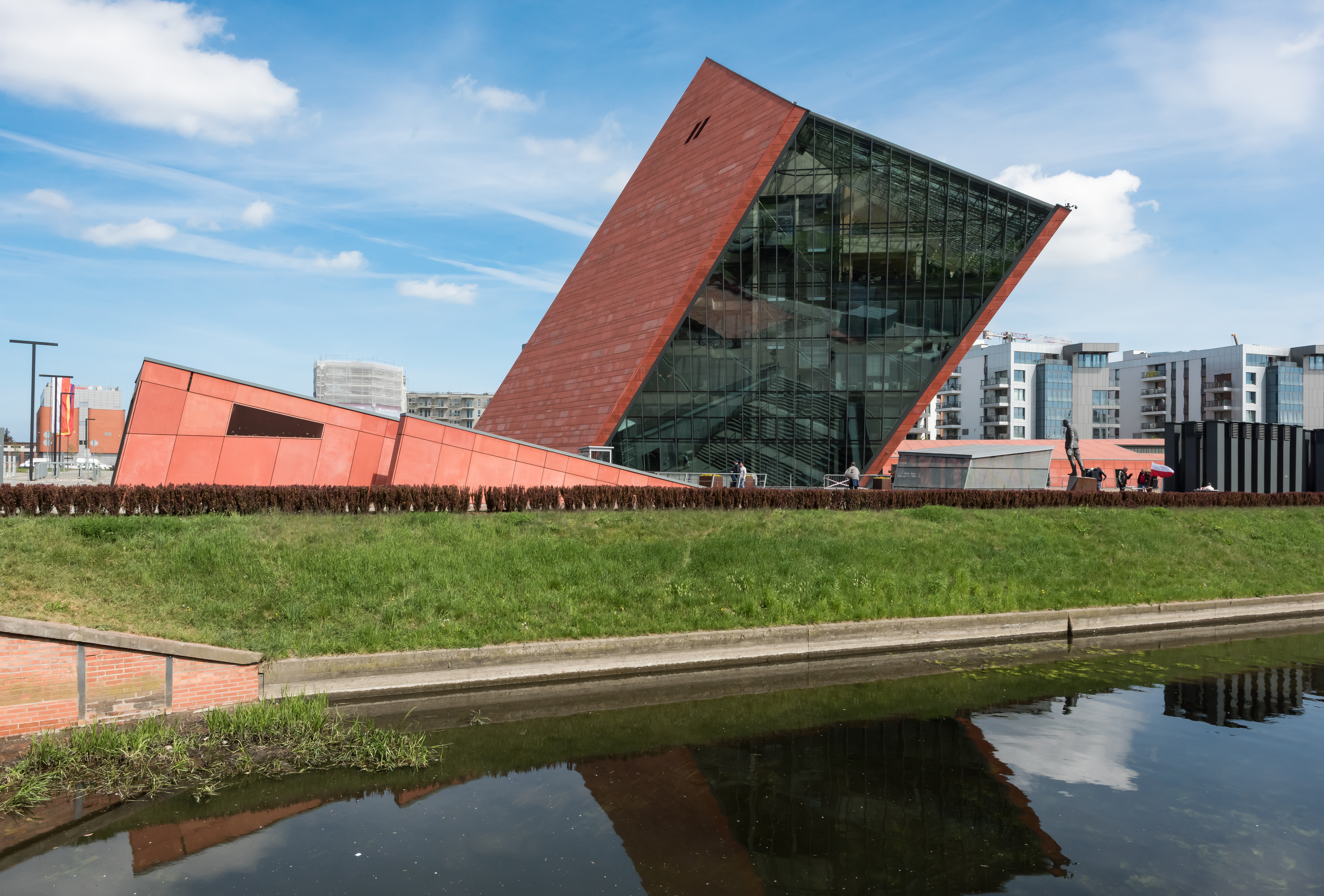
- Exterior of the Museum of WWII
- Established: 1 September 2008; 18 years ago
- Location: Władysław Bartoszewski Square 1, Gdańsk, Poland
- Type: History museum
- Collections: Military equipment, historical documents and war memorabilia
- Visitors: 601,000 (2024)
- Director: Rafał Wnuk
- Website: muzeum1939.pl/strona-glowna

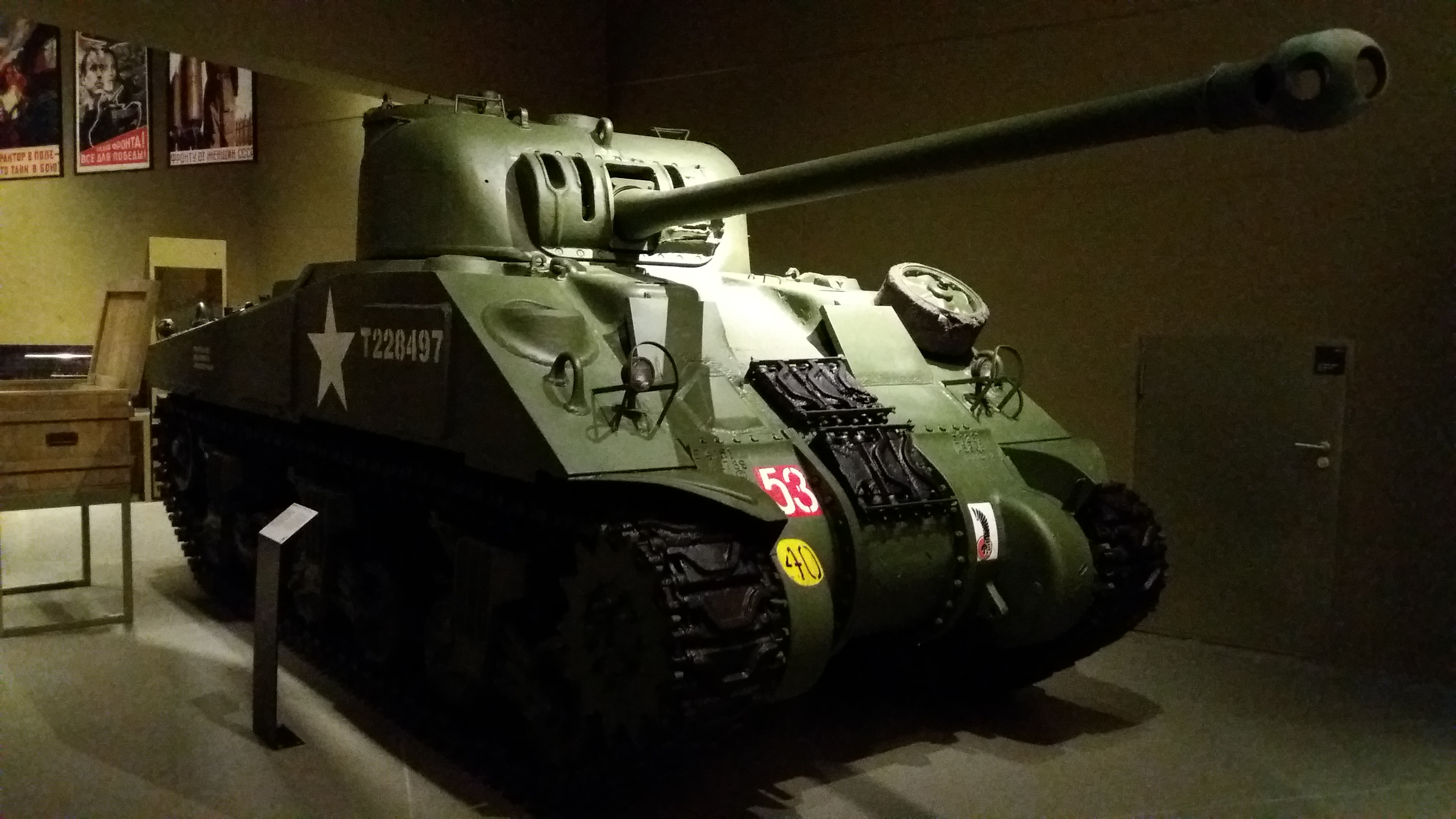
Sherman Tank of Polish I Corps fighting in Western Europe during WWII

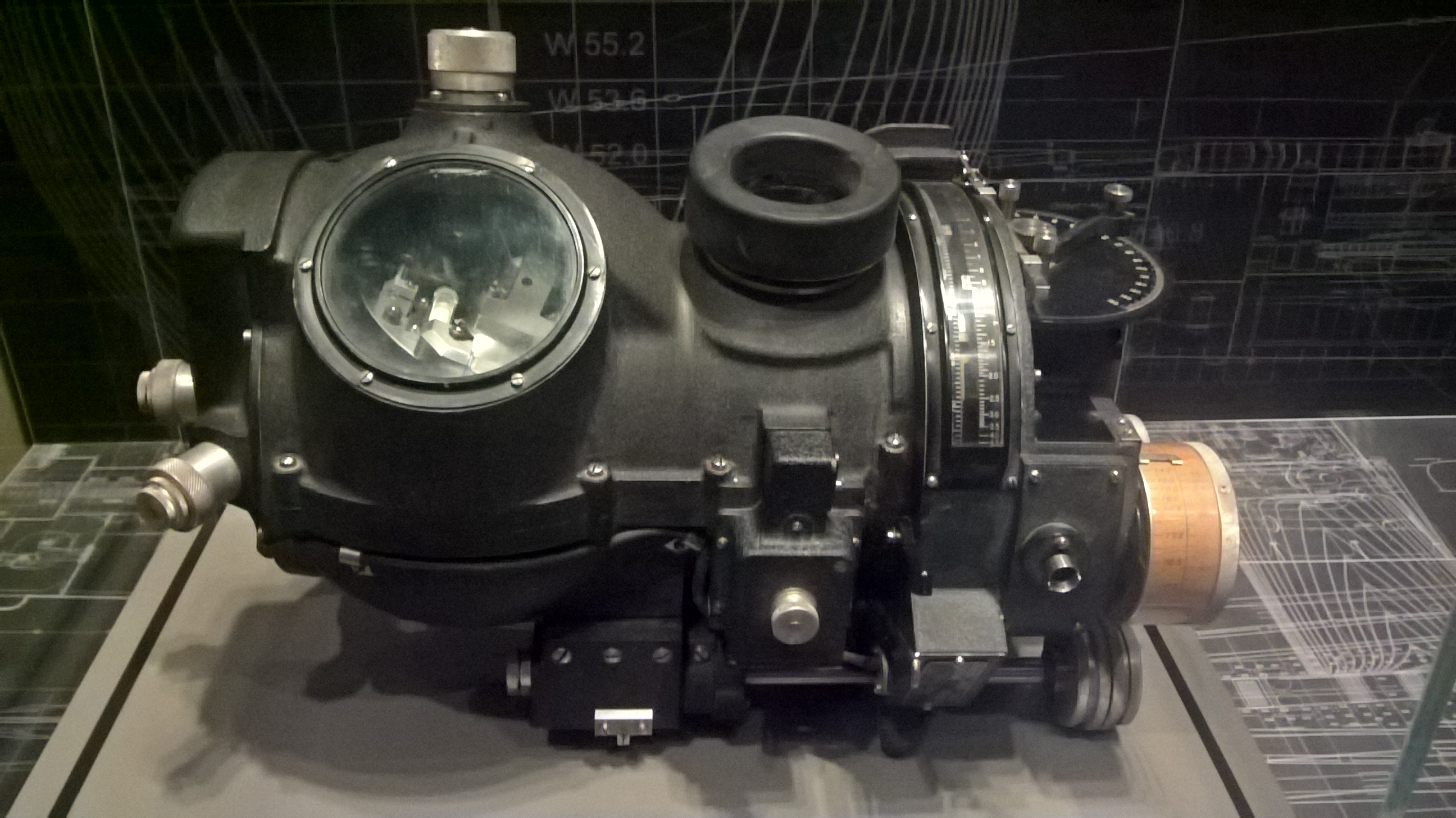
Norden M2WS bombsight

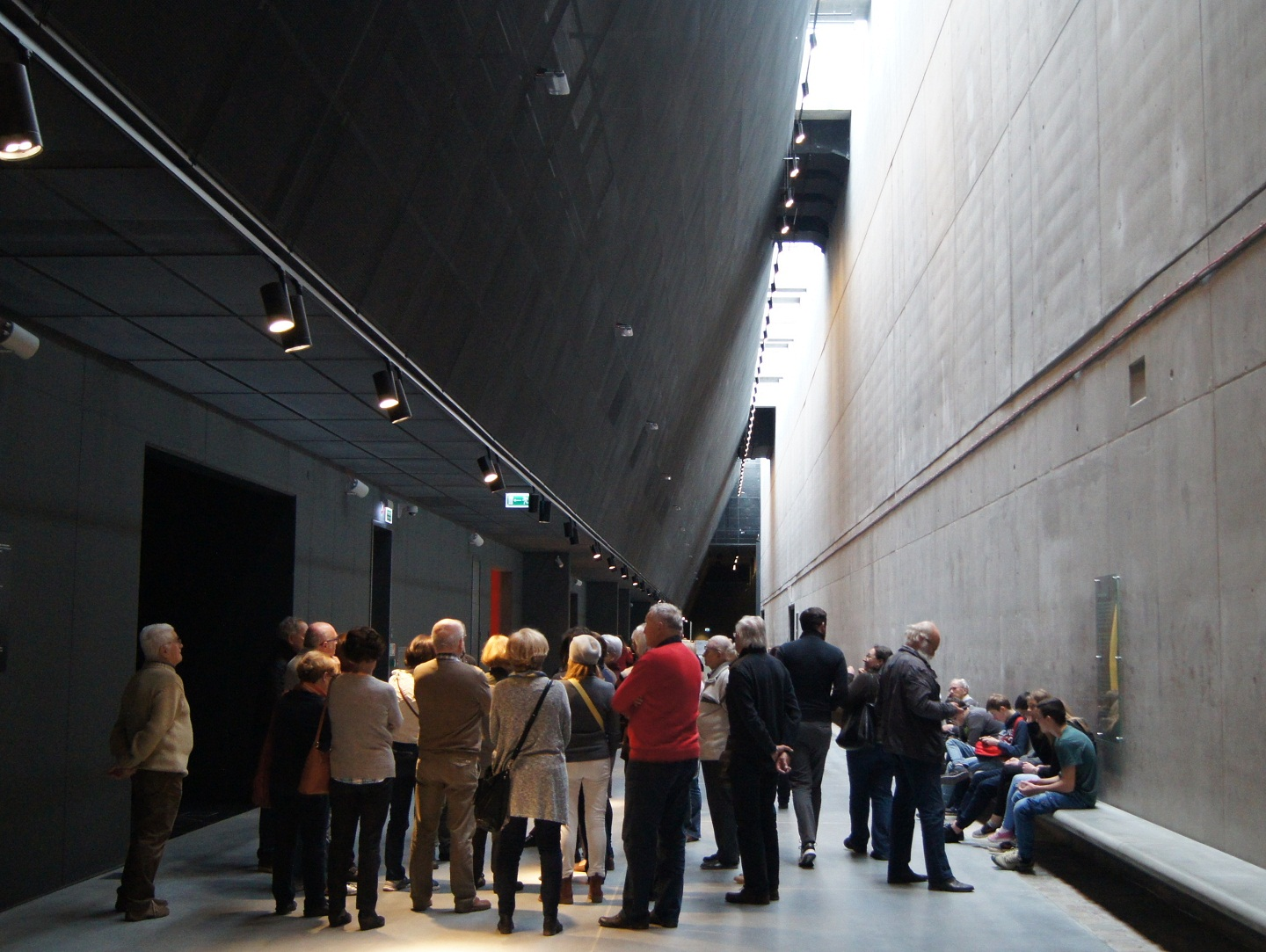
Interior of the museum

The Museum of the Second World War (Polish: Muzeum II Wojny Światowej) is a state cultural institution and museum established in 2008 in Gdańsk, Poland, which is devoted to the Second World War. Its exhibits opened in 2017. The museum is supervised by the Ministry of Culture and National Heritage.

In 2009 the NV Tempora S.A. won the competition for the design of the exhibition which was commissioned in 2015 to Warsaw-based Qumak S.A. company. In 2010 the Kwadrat architectural team won an architectural competition for the building of the Museum of the Second World War and construction began in 2012.

== History ==
The museum was created on 1 September 2008 by way of a regulation of the Minister of Culture and National Heritage under the name Westerplatte Museum in Gdańsk. On the same day, Prime Minister Donald Tusk appointed Paweł Machcewicz as his representative for the Museum of the Second World War. The team of the representative for the museum included Piotr Majewski, historian from the Warsaw University, Rafał Wnuk and Janusz Marszalec, who was the head of the Public Education Department Office of the Institute of National Remembrance in Gdańsk from 2000 to 2007.

The purpose of the team included inter alia the development of a Museum of the Second World War programme concept. The concept had been presented to the public on 6 October 2008 at the Chancellery of the President of the Council of Ministers in Warsaw during a discussion with historians and museologists. The text of the concept and record of the discussion have been published in print, and is also accessible directly via the museum's website. The Museum also had an academic advisory board which helped in the development of the concept and contents of the exhibitions. This board had world renowned scholars of WWII and totalitarianism, including: Norman Davies, Timothy Snyder, Tomasz Szarota and Włodzimierz Borodziej.

On 26 November 2008, the Minister of Culture and National Heritage, Bogdan Zdrojewski changed the name of this institution from the Westerplatte Museum to the Museum of the Second World War in Gdansk. At the same time, he defined the scope of tasks of the facility stating: “the object of the museum’s operations is to amass a collection pertaining to the history of World War II, safeguard it, and make it available, in particular by means of exhibition, popularisation, education, and publishing”.

On 15 April 2016, the Minister of Culture and National Heritage, Piotr Gliński announced the merging of the Museum of the Second World War and the Museum of Westerplatte and the War of 1939 (being organised), created in 2015. Gliński's decision was influenced by the negative reviews of the Main Exhibit of the museum ordered by the ministry and penned by Jan Żaryn, Piotr Semka and Piotr Niwiński. This move has also been interpreted as a move to get Paweł Machcewicz removed in favor of a PiS aligned historian.

At the end of 2016, the Voivodeship Administrative Court in Gdańsk questioned the decision of the minister of culture about combining the two and ordered works to that effect to be halted until the case is examined. The Ministry of Culture deemed the court's decision as invalid. In January 2017, the Supreme Administrative Court overruled the Voivodeship Administrative Court's decision.

On 30 January 2017, the Voivodeship administrative court in Warsaw halted the combining of the two museums until a lawful examination of the complaint filed by the museum's management and the Commissioner for Human Rights. On 23 March, the museum was opened for the public. On 5 April, the Supreme Voivodeship Court finally overruled the motion to suspend execution of the regulation of the Minister of Culture and National Heritage. On 6 April, Karol Nawrocki was appointed as acting director of the combined facilities.

In September 2019, a statue of Witold Pilecki was erected in front of the museum, showing the cavalry captain in his uniform and a camp cap in hand. The piece's designer was Maciej Jagodziński-Jagennmerr, and the casting and erection cost PLN 400,000.

In 2021 Karol Nawrocki left the museum to become Deputy President of the Institute of National Remembrance. He was replaced by Grzegorz Berendt. In 2023 Rafał Wnuk became the new director.

== Building ==
The Prime Minister of Poland, Donald Tusk, opened the architectural competition to design the main building of the museum. The judging panel included such experts as Daniel Libeskind and Jack Lohman, the director of the Museum of London. The winning design was created by the Gdynia-based Kwadrat architectural studio. The seat of the museum faces the Motława River and is located on Wałowa Street in close proximity to the Radunia Canal and the historic Polish Post Office Building.

The museum grounds cover an area of 2.5 acres and the building covers approximately 23,000 square metres. The building consists of three major spheres, which symbolically represent the connection between the past, present and future. The most distinctive part of the building is the 40-metre tall leaning tower with a glass façade, which houses a library, reading and conference rooms as well as cafés and restaurants with a view of the panorama of Gdańsk.

== Management ==
On 7 February 2018, the Minister of Culture and National Heritage and Deputy Prime Minister Piotr Gliński appointed new members of the museum's management board, which include: Sławomir Cenckiewicz, Marek Jan Chodakiewicz, Mirosław Golon, Bogdan Musiał, Andrzej Nowak, Zbigniew Wawer, Tadeusz Wolsza and Jan Żaryn.

In 2024 a new board got appointed with an international board which various historians, of note Barbara Engelking and Paweł Machcewicz.

== Reception ==
The museum was criticized for what has been deemed excessive meddling by the Law and Justice party during its 2015-2023 rule. The new exhibits placed a high emphasis on the victimization of ethnic Poles during the war. Several of the original authors filed a lawsuit for copyright infringement when the exhibits were changed without consultation, which they won in October 2020.

In December 2017, a group of five hundred academics signed an open letter that called the changes to the museum "barbaric" and part of an attempt to turn it into a "propaganda institution," while a government spokesperson defended the changes, saying the exhibits needed to be "corrected" and adding that "Some things need to be rearranged, which happens at all museums in the world. But it is also a Polish museum financed by Polish taxpayers. Polish people simply want the museum they have financed to tell their story, to refer to the Polish point of view. The museum is located in Poland and must answer to those who financed it."

In June 2024, a few months after a new government had been elected to take over from Law and Justice and after Rafał Wnuk had been appointed as the museum's new director, a new controversy would emerge over changes to a permanent exhibition relating to German-Nazi concentration and death camps in which Law and Justice-era additions were reversed; these included portraits of Maksymilian Kolbe and the Ulma family as well as a portrait of Witold Pilecki, though an additional portrait of Pilecki that had been part of the exhibition since before Law and Justice came to power was left in place. The controversy was primarily fuelled by Law and Justice politicians such as former education minister Przemysław Czarnek and party leader Jarosław Kaczyński, though current Polish defence minister Władysław Kosiniak-Kamysz would also call for the reinstatement of information pertaining to Pilecki, Kolbe, and the Ulma family. A few days after the controversy began, the museum declared that, in light of an "authentic social need", work would begin on representing Kolbe and the Ulma family in its permanent exhibitions once more, albeit in a way that did not repeat the "inaccuracies and errors" of their earlier representation.

In 2025 there was a controversy about a temporary exhibition "Our Boys" which focused on Polish soldiers that served in the Wehrmacht. The exhibit was created using German, Polish and local archives. The then President of Poland, Andrzej Duda, stated that the exhibition blurred the lines of responsibility of the perpetrators and was a moral provocation. There was a protest staged outside the museum by right-wing groups. The exhibition director Andrzej Hoja has gone on to defend the temporary exhibition, stating that the exhibition is not meant to accuse but to show the shades of grey. The museum has gone on to state it is not a political exhibition and state the aim of the exhibition was to acknowledge individuals within Polish communities.

== Gallery ==
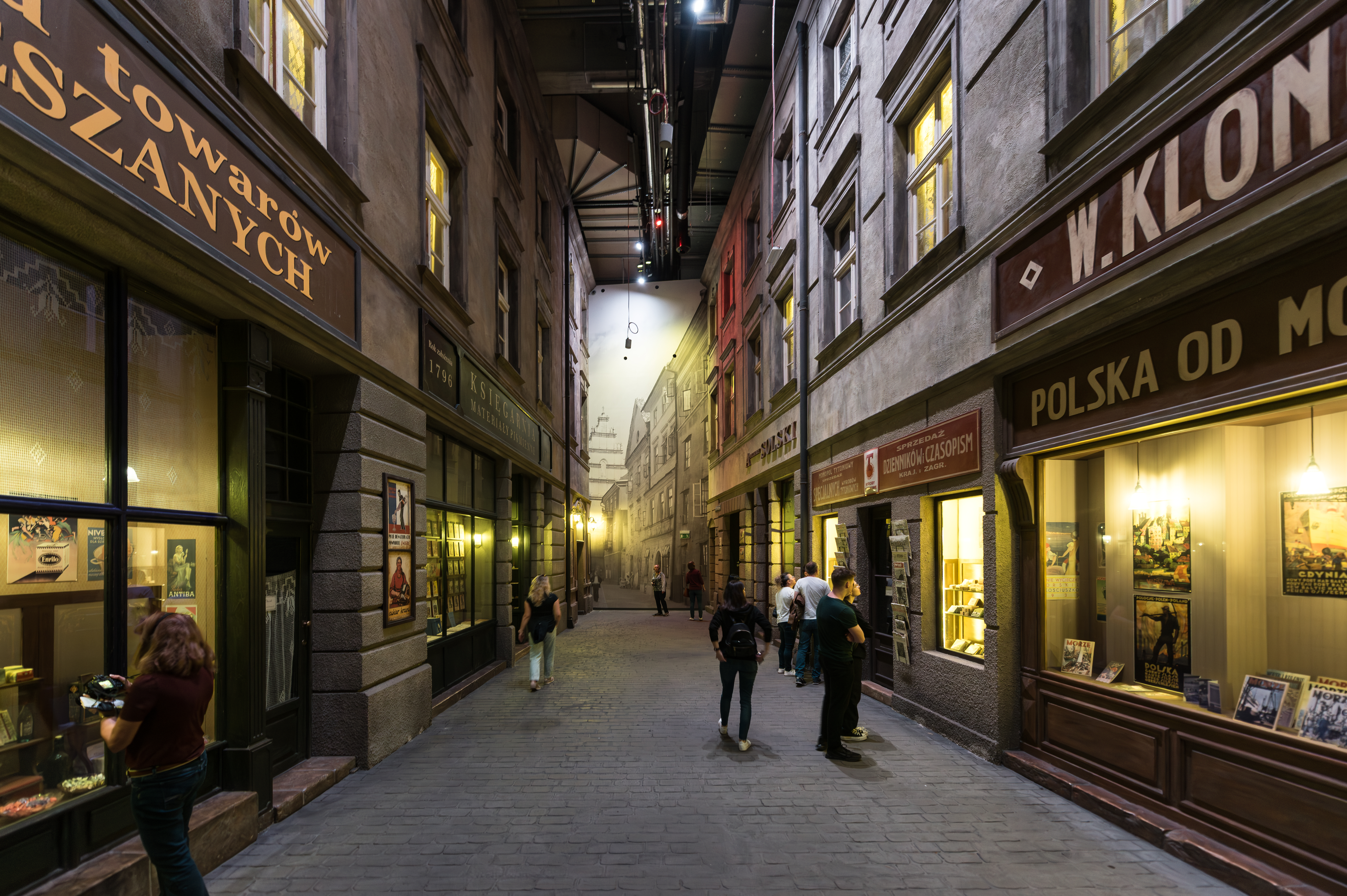
Polish city street, 1930s

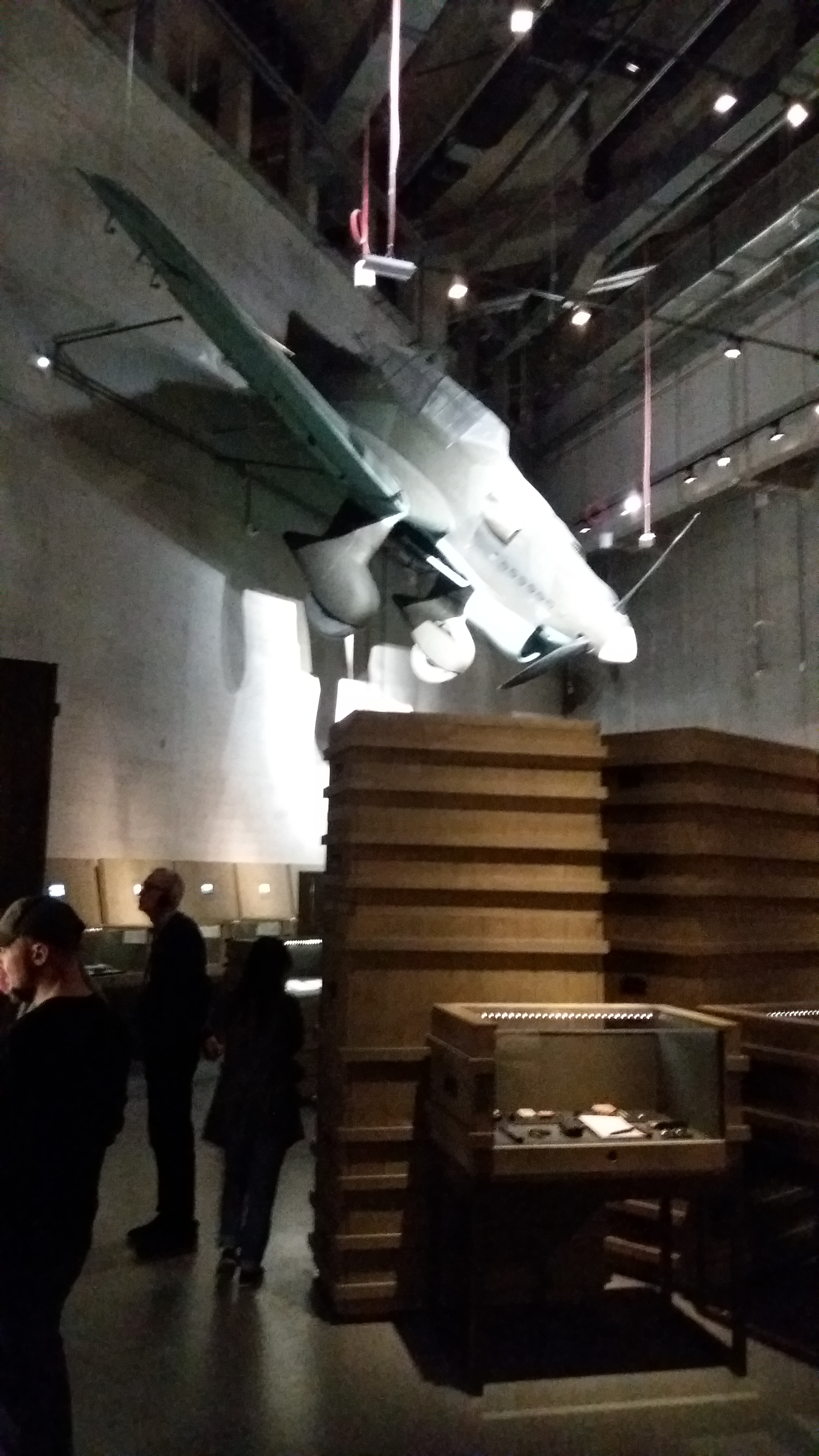
German Junkers Ju 87 "Stuka" in permanent exhibition

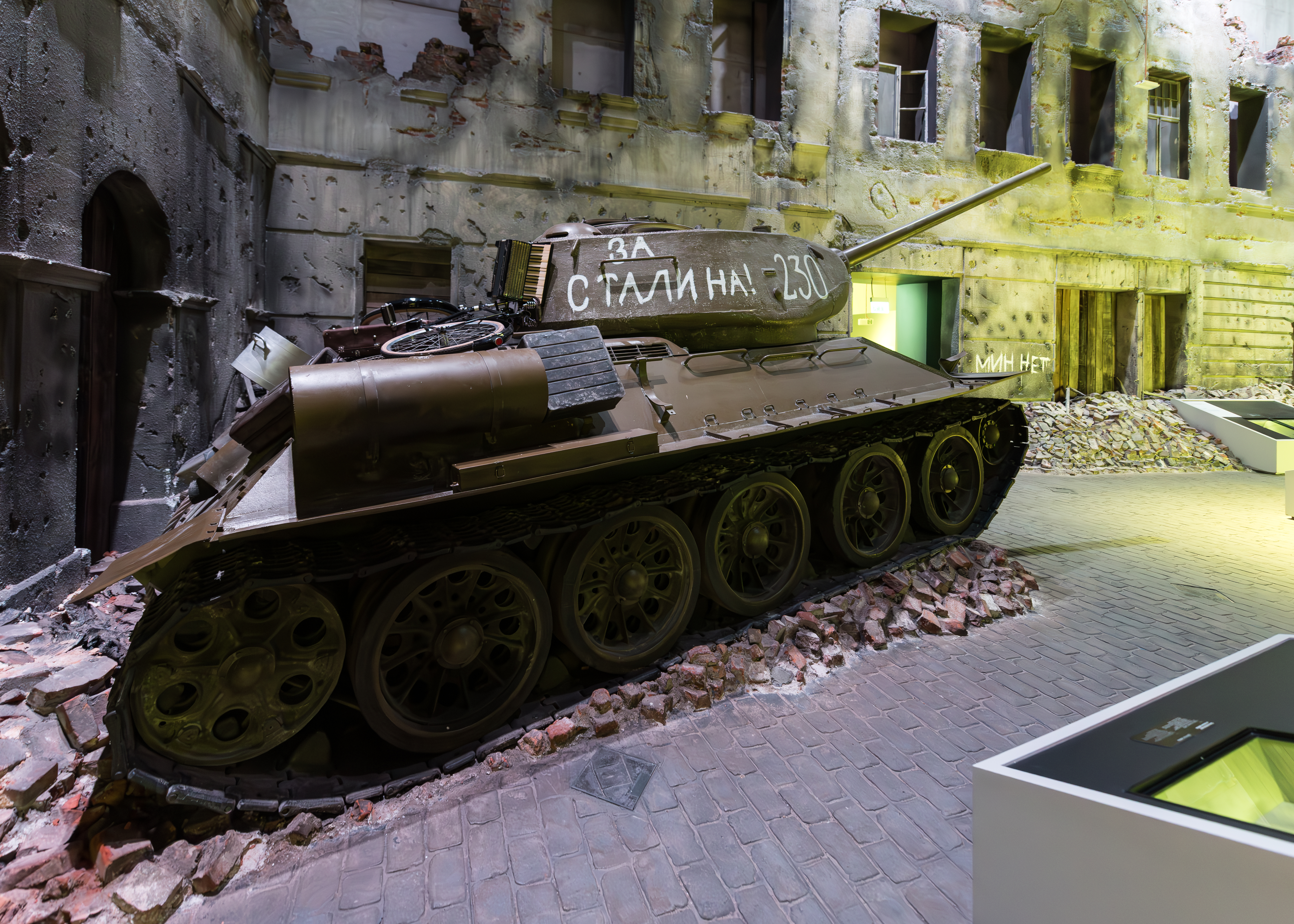
Soviet T-34 tank inside

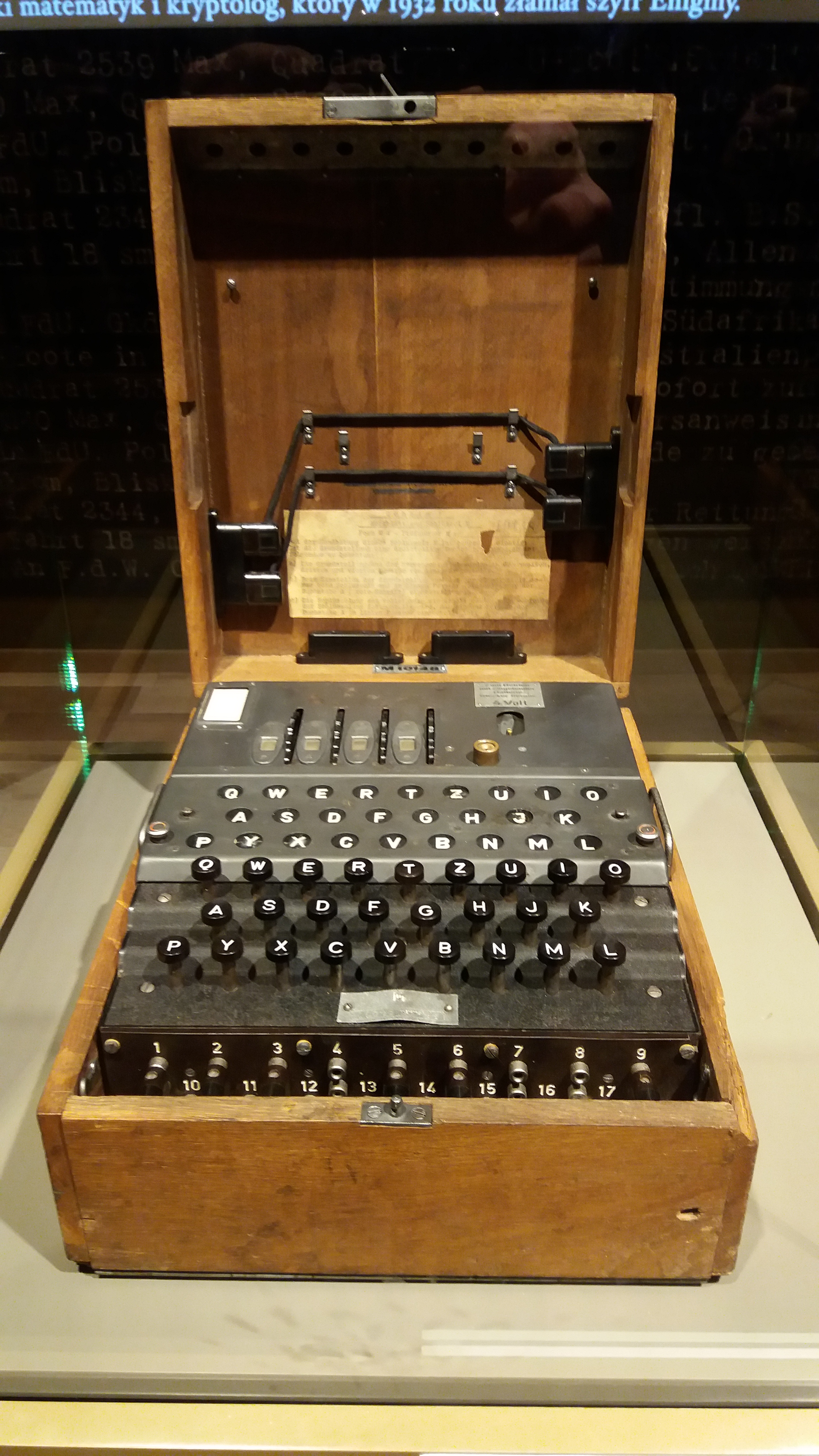
Enigma machine cipher machine

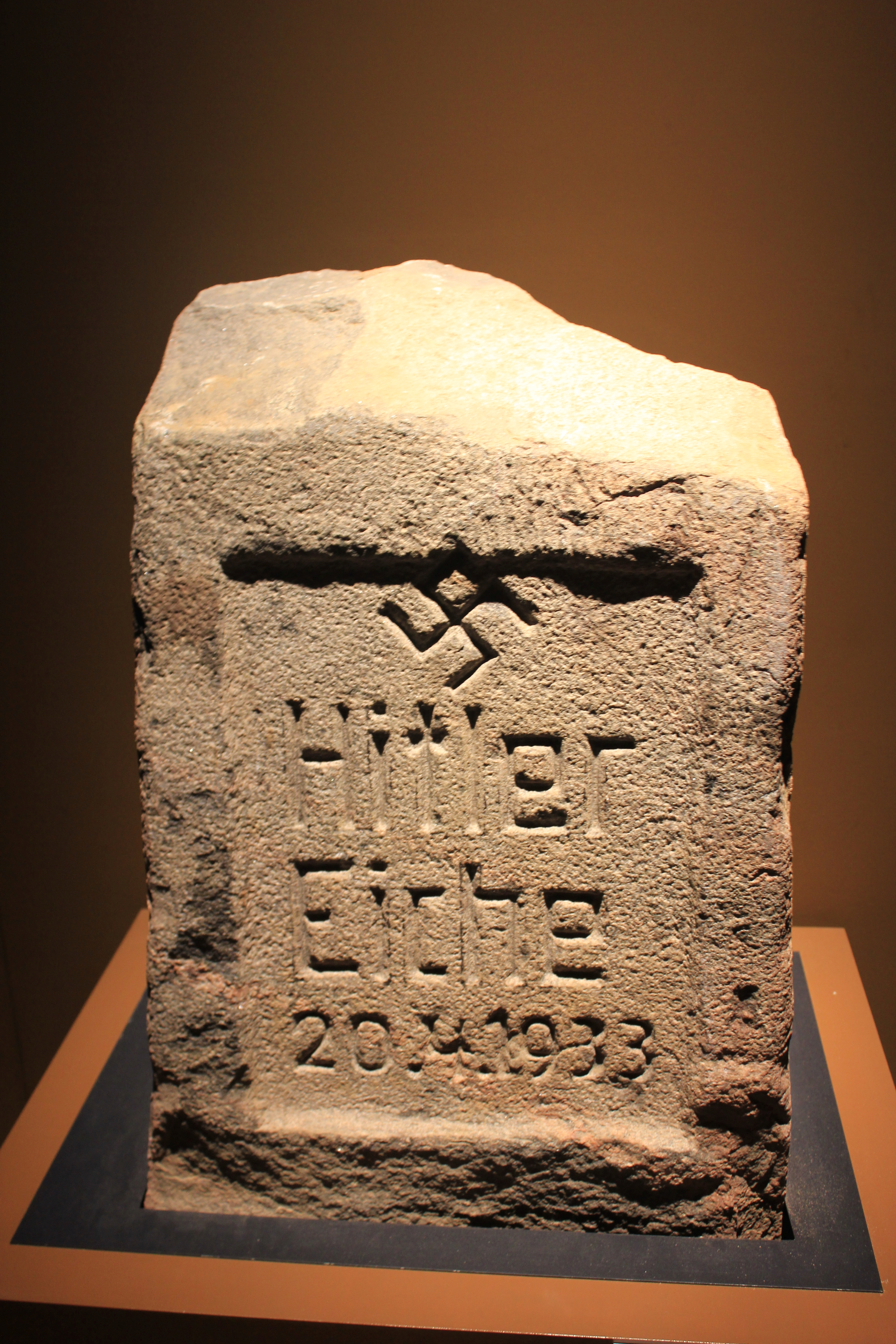
A stone from Krępa Kaszubska marking an oak tree planted to celebrate the birth of Adolf Hitler https://de.wikipedia.org/wiki/Hitler-Eiche

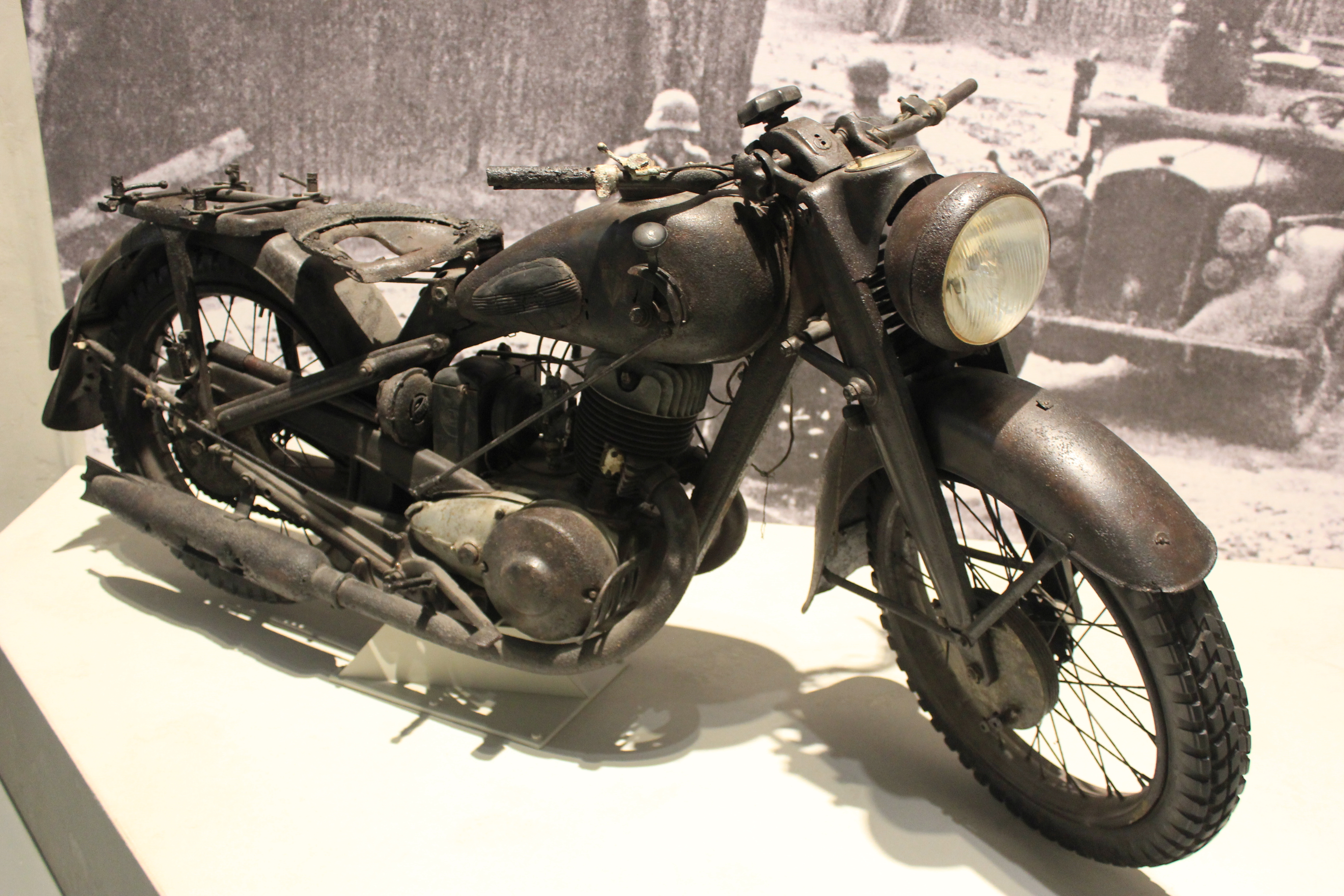
DKW motorcycle

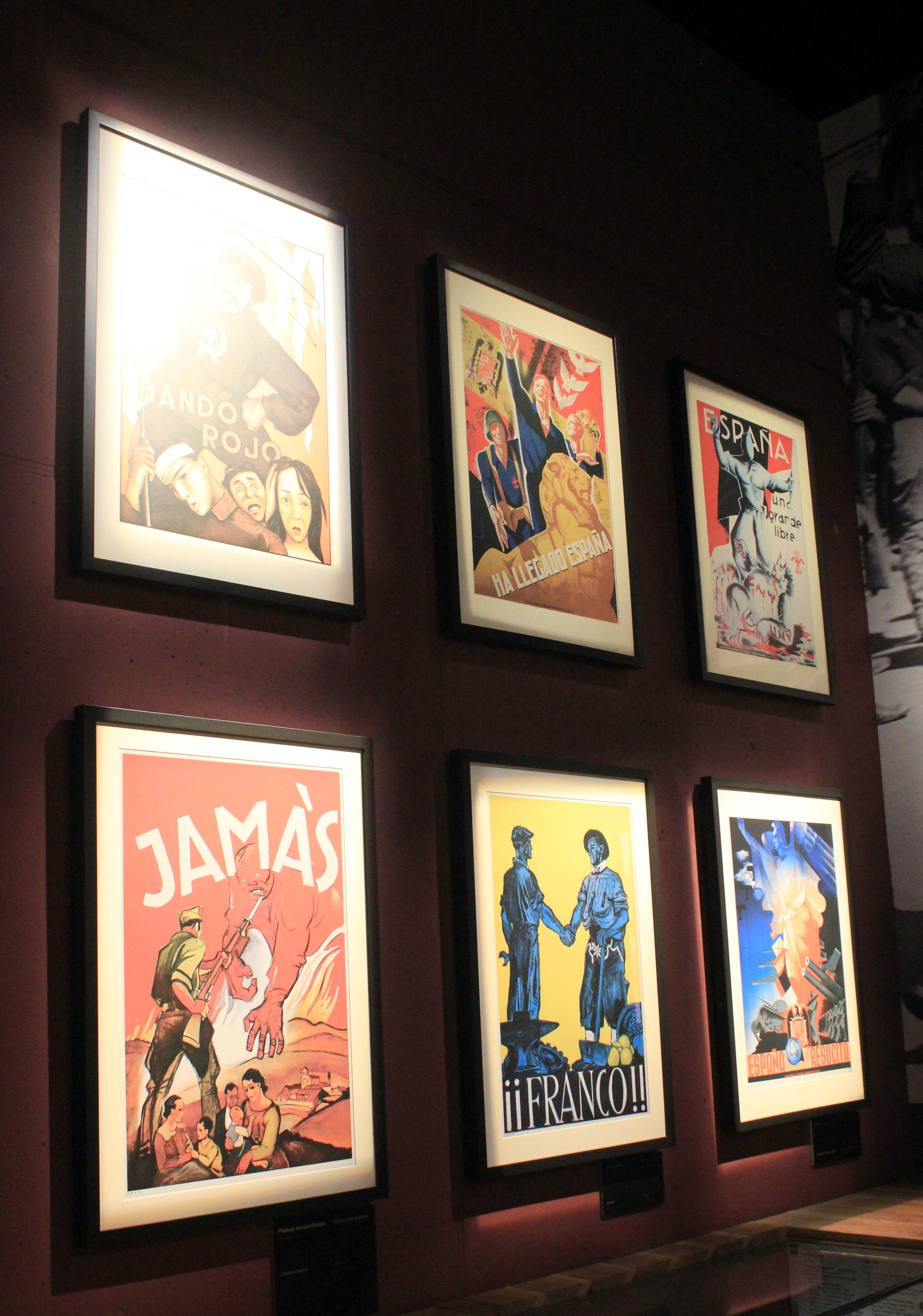
Spanish nationalist posters

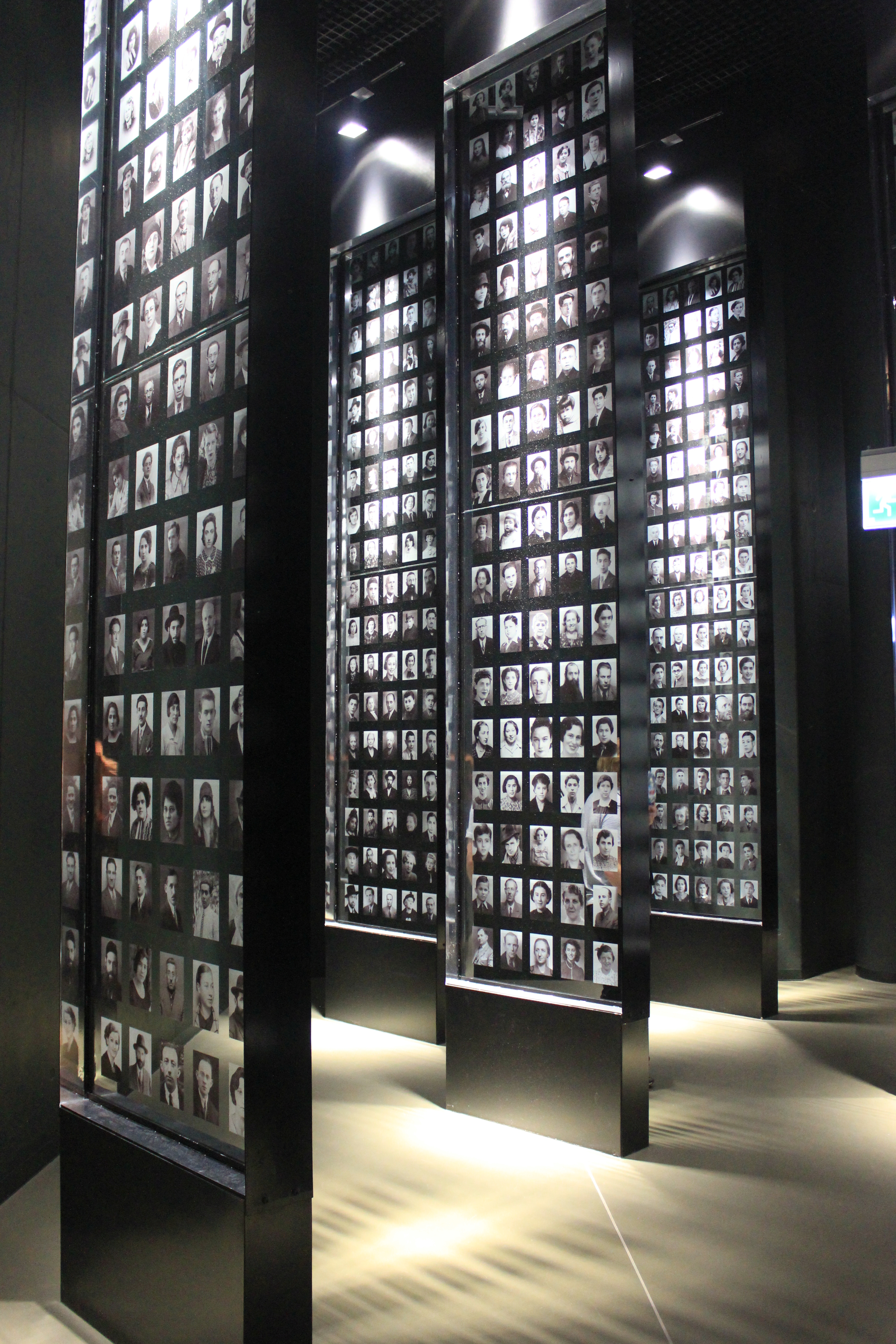
Photographs of Holocaust victims

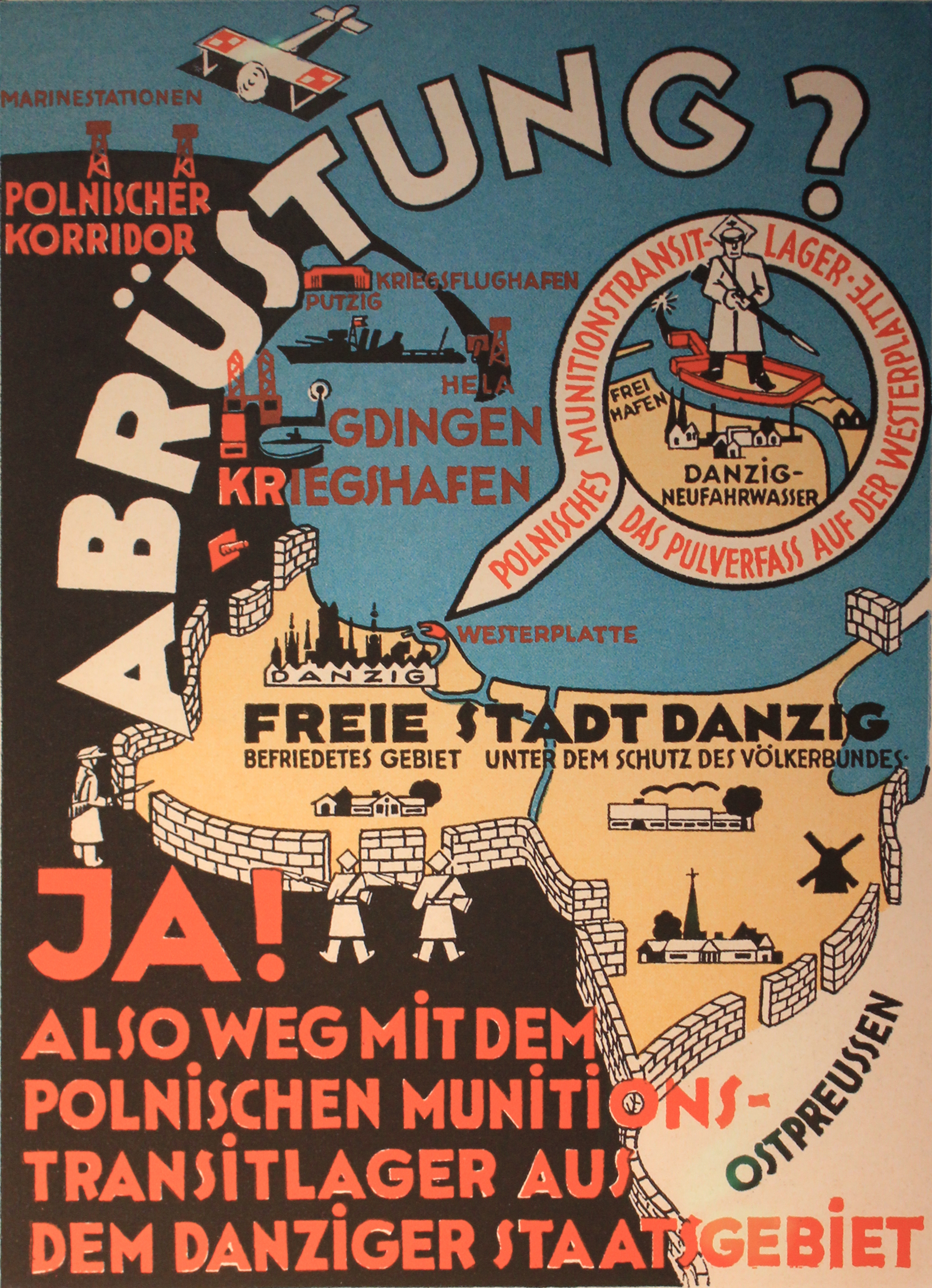
German propaganda poster

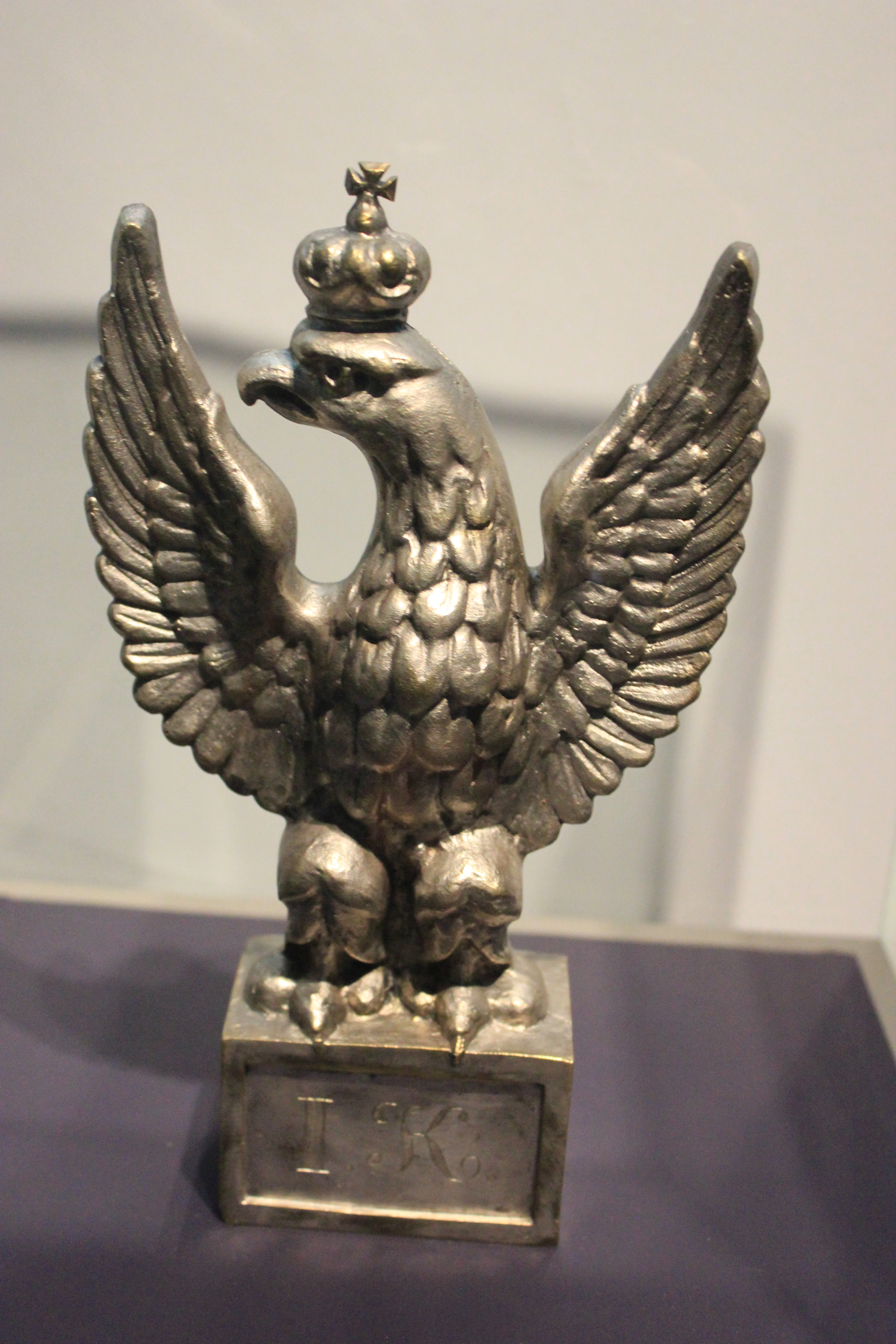
Eagle from the banner of the First Polish Corps

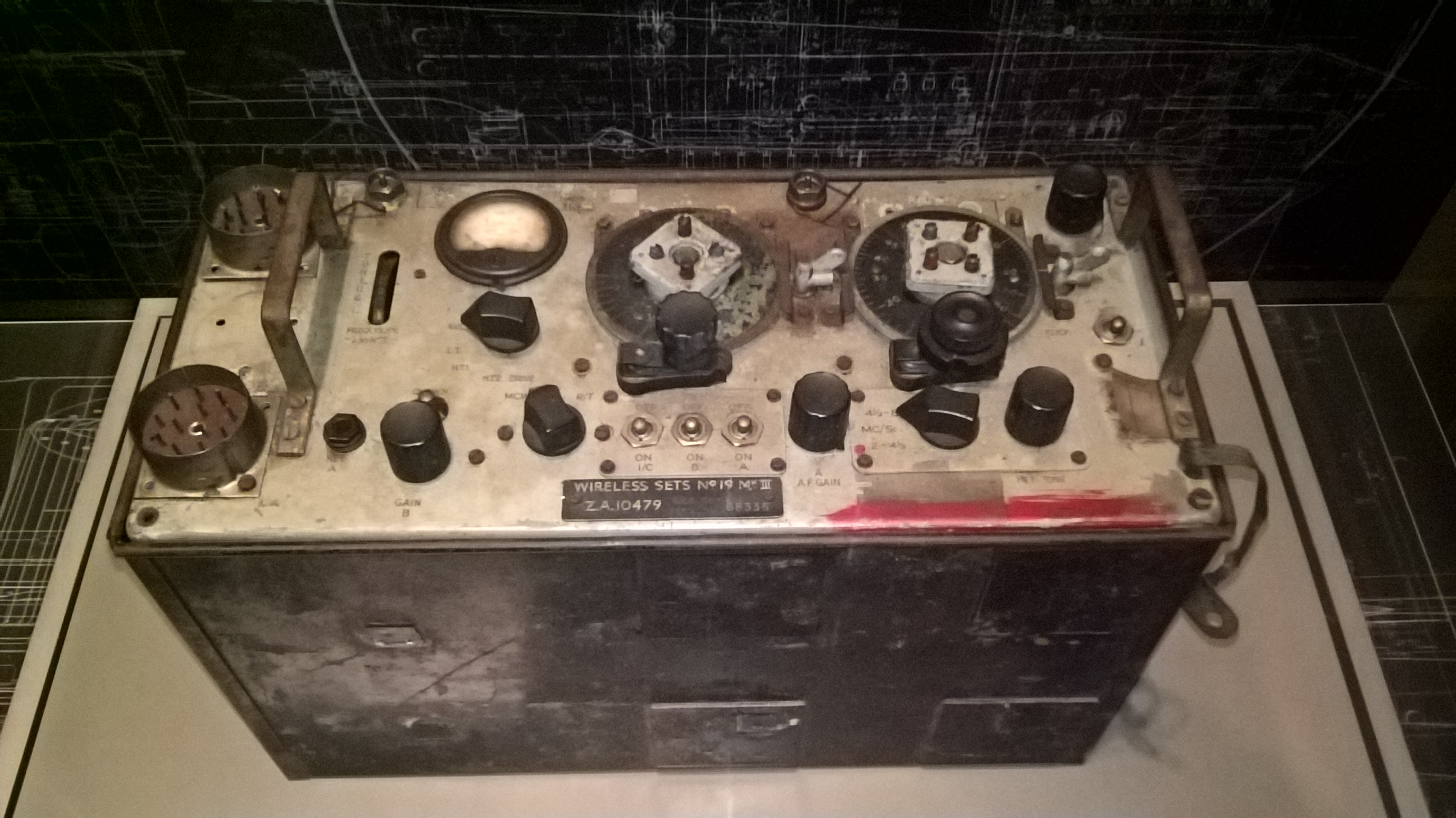
Wireless Set No. 19

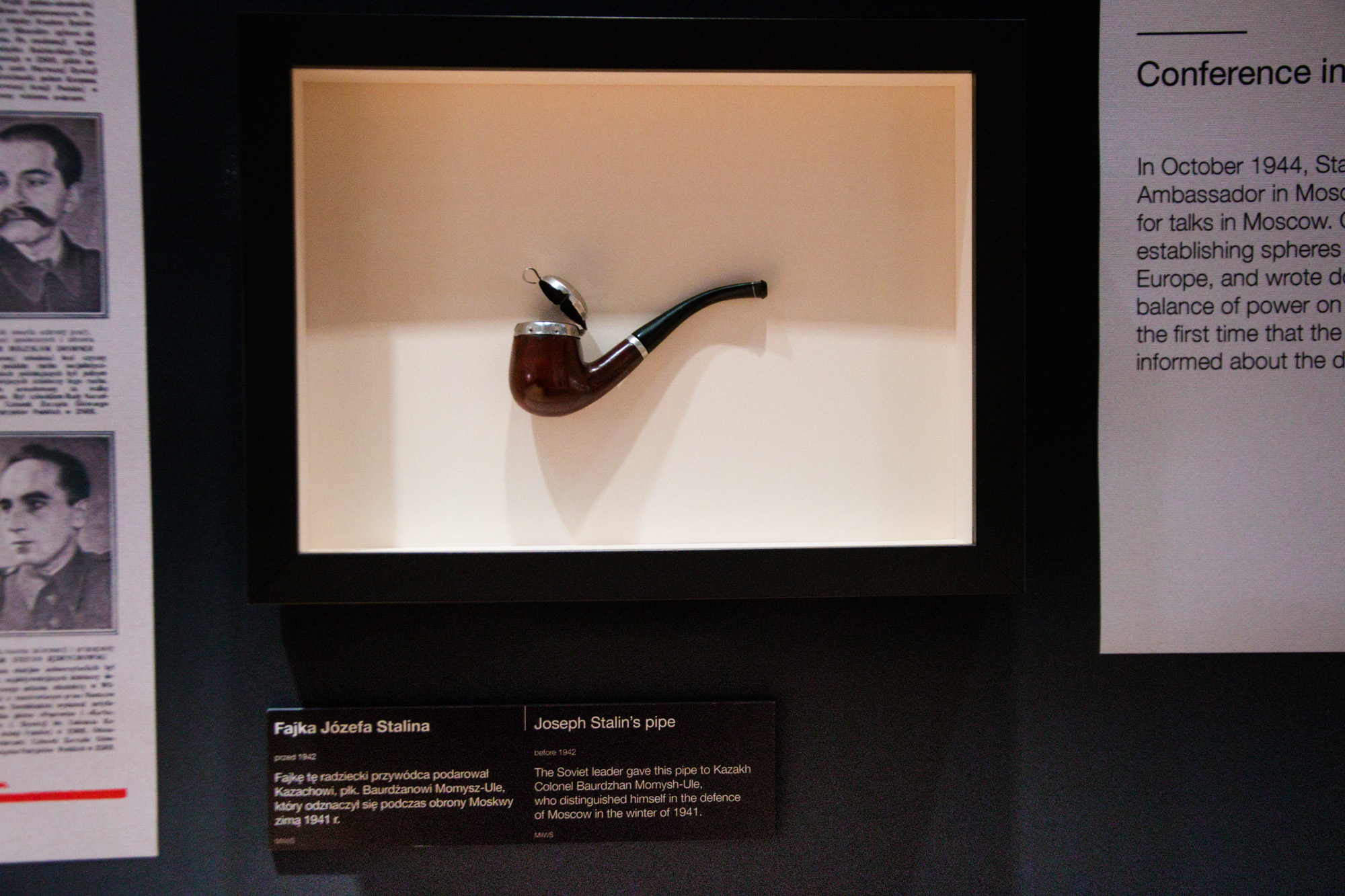
Joseph Stalin's pipe

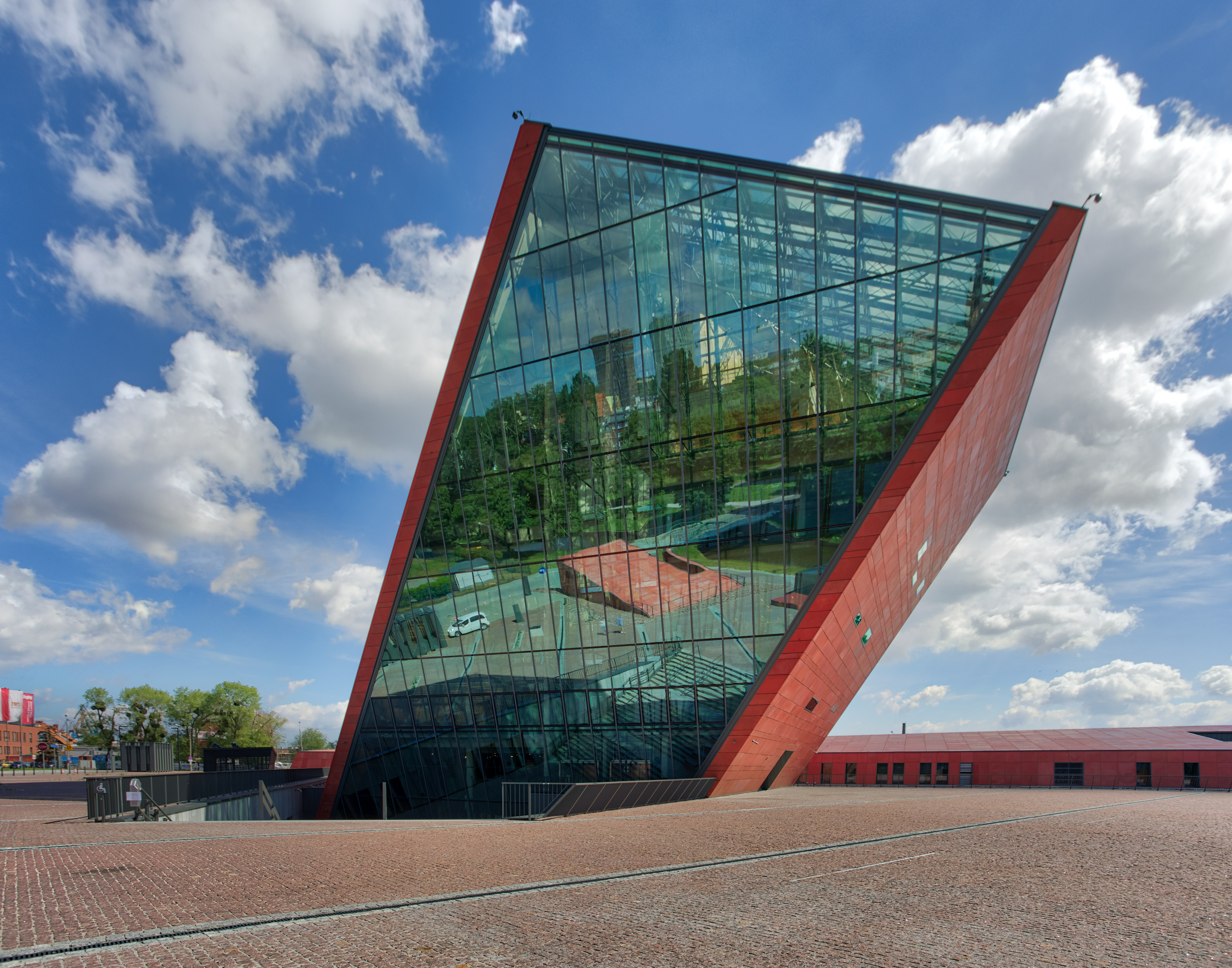
Exterior of the museum

== See also ==
- Inclined building
- Museums in Poland
- The International Museum of World War II
- Mausoleum of Polish Rural Martyrology in Michniów
