= Jack Lohman =

British museum administrator

Jack Lohman CBE
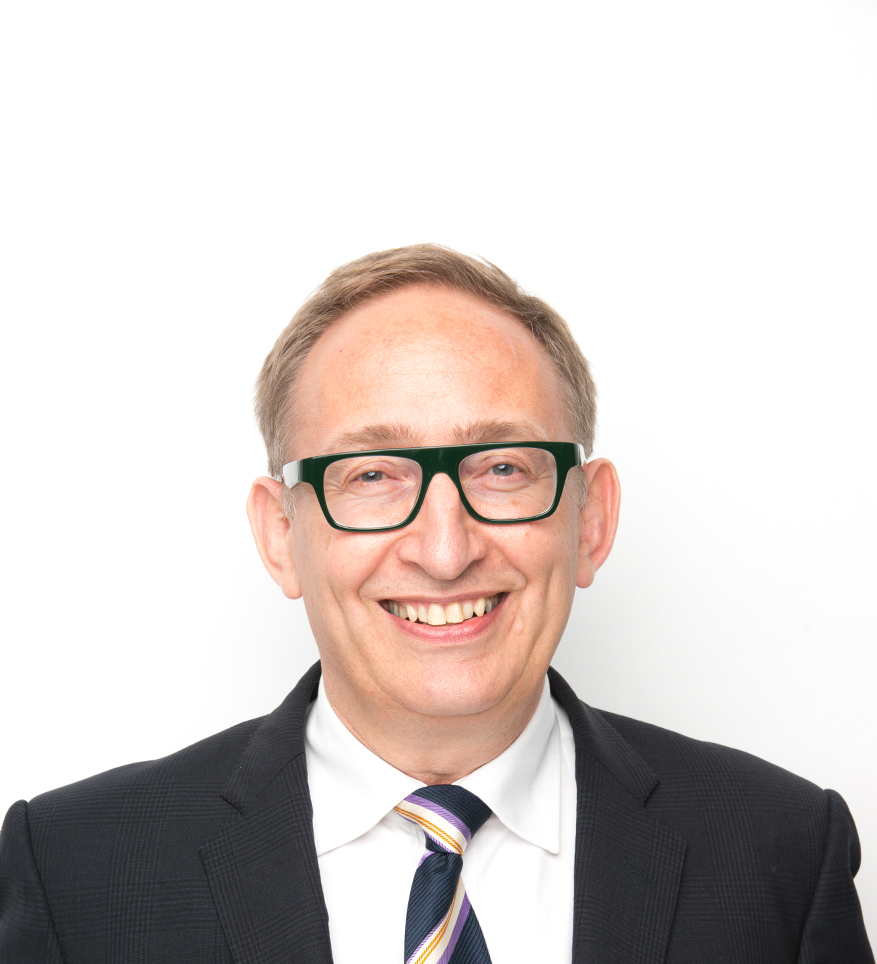
- Born: Jacek Lohman; 23 May 1958 (age 68); London, United Kingdom
- Education: University of Manchester
- Occupation: Museum curator

Jack Lohman (born 23 May 1958) CBE, born Jacek Lohman, is a British museum administrator who has developed policy relating to museums. He has worked with governments in Africa, Europe, the Middle East and North America on issues of cultural diplomacy, repatriation and human remain in museums. He has received numerous awards including the Bene Merito from the Government of Poland and CBE from HM the Queen.

Jack Lohman was the chief executive of the Royal British Columbia Museum Canada until he resigned in February 2021 during an investigation into racism and discrimination allegations posed by former head of the Indigenous collections and repatriation department. He was president of the Canadian Museum Association, is a member of the board of the Adam Mickiewicz Institute and the City of Warsaw Museum, and a board member of the British Columbia Achievement Foundation.

== Early life and education ==
Jack Lohman was born and grew up in London, to which his parents had immigrated from Poland. He attended the Cardinal Vaughan Memorial School, followed by the University of East Anglia in Norwich, from which he graduated in 1979 with an honours degree in art history. He was awarded scholarships to study architecture at the University of Warsaw and the Freie Universität Berlin in 1981, receiving from the latter a master's degree in architecture. In 2008, he received an honorary doctorate from the University of Westminster, followed by one in 2009 from the Polish University Abroad in London and in 2012 from his alma mater, the University of East Anglia.

== Museums ==
In 1999, Lohman became the chief executive of Iziko Museums of Cape Town, South Africa, an organisation consisting of fifteen national museums including the Iziko Museums and the South African National Gallery.

Lohman returned in London in 2002 to become director of Museum of London, where in 2004 he opened the Museum of London Docklands. From 2002 to 2008 he was chairman of the International Council of Museums UK. From 2008 to 2013, Lohman was chairman of the National Museum in Warsaw. He has been on the board of the Second World War Museum in Gdańsk, Poland and is a former member of the UK National Commission's to UNESCO’s Culture Committee.

In 2012 Lohman left the Museum of London, going to Victoria, British Columbia to become CEO of the Royal British Columbia Museum, a post he held until 2021. In 2014, he was appointed to the executive board of the Canadian Commission for UNESCO and in 2017 was elected vice president of the Canadian Museums Association

Since 1997, Lohman has been a professor of museum design and communication at the Bergen Academy of Art and Design in Bergen, Norway. He was chief editor of UNESCO's publications series "Museums and Diversity" and is a senior editor of Berghahn Journals’ "Museum Worlds". He has written a number of books including "Museums at the Crossroads?" (2014) and "Treasures of the Royal BC Museum and Archives" (2015). Lohman has received state honours from Colombia and Rwanda, in 2011 was awarded Poland's Bene Merito honorary badge and in the 2012 Queen's Birthday Honours was inducted into the Order of the British Empire. He lives in Warsaw, Poland.

== Book collector ==
Lohman has a personal library of approximately 30,000 books. In 2012, when he moved to Victoria to take his new position as CEO of the Royal British Columbia Museum, he spent nearly $4,000 to move about a third of his collection with him, the other 20,000 volumes remaining at his home in Wimbledon, London.

Lohman is a polyglot who besides English speaks Polish, German, French, Spanish, Portuguese and Japanese and therefore his library too includes multiple languages.

Cultural offices
Preceded by Pauline Rafferty	Director Royal British Columbia Museum; 2012–2021	Succeeded by Alicia Dubois
Preceded by Simon Thurley	Director of the Museum of London; 2002 – 21 March 2012	Succeeded by David Spence (Interim)
