= Paweł Machcewicz =

Polish historian

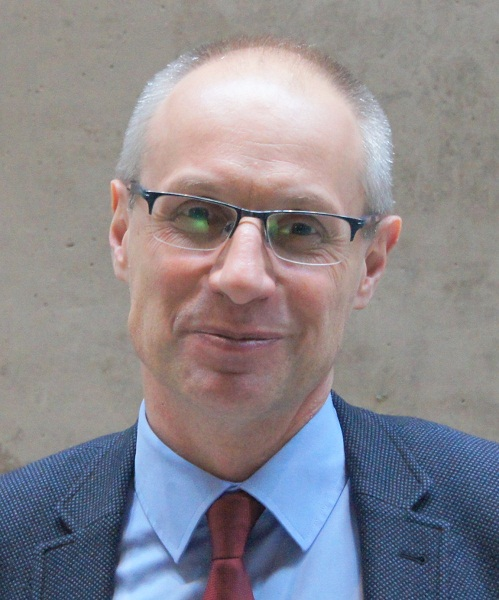
- Photographic portrait of Machcewicz taken on his final day as director of the Museum of the Second World War, 2017
- Born: Paweł Mateusz Machcewicz; April 27, 1966 (age 60); Warsaw, Warsaw Voivodeship, Polish People's Republic
- Education: PAN
- Occupation: Historian

Paweł Mateusz Machcewicz (born 27 April 1966, in Warsaw) is a Polish historian and university professor.

== Biography ==
Machcewicz graduated in 1989 from the Department of History at the University of Warsaw. In 1990, he became a research analyst at the Institute of History of the Polish Academy of Sciences. In 1993, Machcewicz defended his doctorate, and in 2000, received a post-doctoral degree in humanities in the field of Political Theories. He was a grant recipient from the Fulbright Foundation of Georgetown University and from the Spanish Ministry of Foreign Affairs, among others. In 2009, Machcewicz received the title of Professor of Humanities at the Nicolaus Copernicus University in Toruń. He also lectures at the Collegium Civitas.

=== Career ===
In the years 1999-2006, Machcewicz acted as the editor of one of the featured departments of the historical magazine Mówią wieki. From 2000 to 2006, he served as president of the Bureau of Public Education at the Institute of National Remembrance (IPN). In 2007, he ran as a candidate for the Collegium office of the IPN on the recommendation of Members of Parliament from Civic Platform.

On September 1, 2008, Machcewicz became one of the principal advisers to the Prime Minister of Poland Donald Tusk, and an attorney in the Office of the President of the Council of Ministers, appointed to the Museum of the Second World War in Gdańsk. He was honoured with a Jerzy Giedroyc prize, among others. Machcewicz is married, with two children.

== Selected publications ==
- Der Beginn der Vernichtung. Zum Mord an den Juden in Jedwabne und Umgebung im Sommer 1941 (co-author), 2004;
- Emigracja w polityce międzynarodowej, 1999;
- Historia Hiszpanii (co-author), 1998;
- "Monachijska menażeria", walka z Radiem Wolna Europa 1950–1989, 2007;
- Polski rok 1956, 1993;
- Władysław Gomułka, 1995;
- Wokół Jedwabnego vol. 1-2 (ed.), 2002;
- Zranione miasto. Poznań w czerwcu 1956 roku (co-author), 2003;
- Rebellious Satellite: Poland 1956, 2009.
