= Narutowicz Institute =

Polish educational and historical research institute

- Other name: Instytut Narutowicza
- Parent institution: Ministry of Culture and National Heritage
- Founder: Piotr Gliński
- Established: February 17, 2020
- Director: Adam Leszczyński
- Formerly called: Roman Dmowski and Ignacy Jan Paderewski Institute for the Legacy of Polish National Thought
- Location: Warsaw, Poland
- Coordinates: 52°12′42″N 20°57′56″E>
- Interactive map of Narutowicz Institute
- Website: instytutnarutowicza.pl

The Gabriel Narutowicz Institute of Political Thought (Polish: Instytut Myśli Politycznej im. Gabriela Narutowicza) is a Polish educational and historical research institute. Announced to appear at a press conference on 3 February 2020, it was formally inaugurated by the Minister of Culture and National Heritage, Piotr Gliński, on 17 February that year.

Its stated goal is to conduct research in the history of Poland through the lens of political philosophy, with most attention devoted to the analyses on Catholic, conservative and National Democratic thought, though some have raised doubts about the true purpose and impartiality of the organisation.

Since its inception, it has started the Patriotic Fund to promote its goals and is currently repurposing a manor in north-eastern Poland for the Roman Dmowski museum. It has also participated in the lawsuit against the National Radical Camp as an expert witness.

== Creation ==
Since the government of the Law and Justice party has taken power following the 2015 elections, there has been a steady trend of creating more institutions commemorating collective memory, such as the Pilecki Institute, the Warsaw Ghetto Muzeum, and Markowa Ulma-Family Museum of Poles Who Saved Jews in World War II.

On the press conference of 3 February 2020, the Minister of Culture presented the newly formed institute as an educational and scientific institute popularising knowledge about nationalist and conservative movements (which he later stated was an obligation) and as a platform "for an honest discussion", with Jan Żaryn, the director, clarifying that it would be primarily educational. The director added that the Institute would eliminate what he saw as "the very strong stereotypes" among Poles that created misunderstandings about conservative movements, and that they, when rectified, would serve as a base for development of the following generations.

In following interviews, he would later precise that the reasons to create the Institute were that the studies in Catholic and nationalist movements were neglected because of the "genocide of the [Polish] elites" and the propaganda of the Polish People's Republic and that there was a tendency to portray pre-war nationalist movements as anti-Semitic (which he argued was not the case in most situations) and ignoring other aspects of their activities. He also added that the Institute had been created as a continuation of a "clear and easily readable" historical policy of the government of the Law and Justice (PiS) party, stressing that the organisation he leads intends to get across with its research to the teachers and the young.

The Institute for the Legacy of Polish National Thought was formally formed by an order of the Minister of Culture on 17 February 2020, and an advisory board of 15 members was appointed by the Ministry of Culture in late June that year.

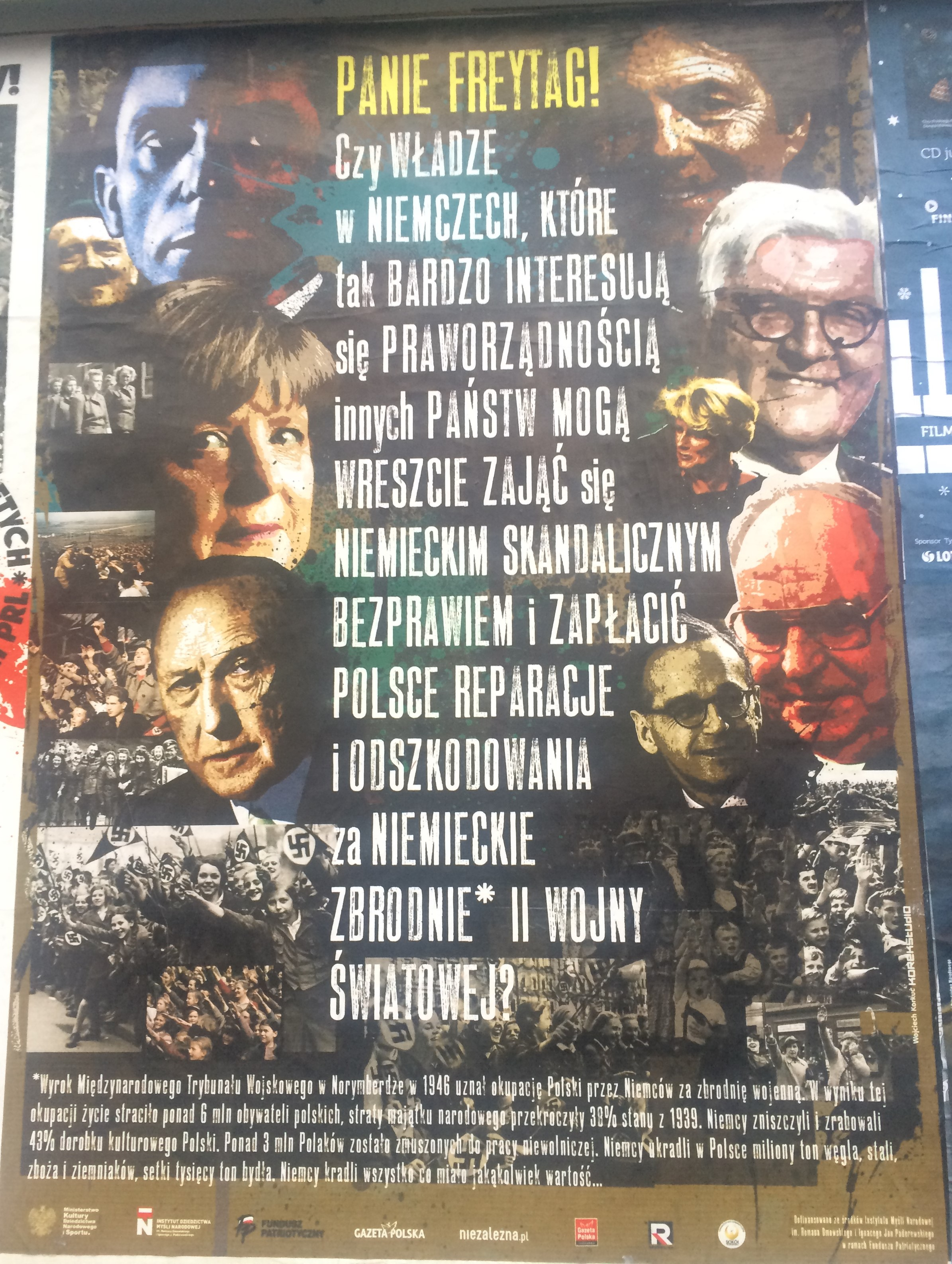
A poster from a campaign financed by the Institute, advocating to pay out World War II reparations for Poland.

== Activities ==
The Institute operates on a budget allocated by the Ministry of Culture - in 2020, 1.5 mln PLN was given to the Institute, which sum increased to 6.6 mln PLN the following year. In addition to that, the Institute administers the Patriotic Fund, which was originally a campaign pledge in the 2020 presidential election from the PiS officials and was created in March 2021. It distributes grants amounting to 30 mln PLN to the organisations that promote the memory of the history and heritage of Poland, with a particular accent on the nationalist, Catholic and conservative movements. The Institute will also run the Lutosławski manor in Drozdowo in north-eastern Poland, converting it to the muzeum of Roman Dmowski and of Lutosławski family.

The Institute has published a two-volume biographical dictionary of the Polish conservatists and Catholic activists.

In an ongoing (Note: as of June 2021) court investigation in Kraków, the Institute for the Legacy of Polish National Thought was asked to submit an expert opinion on whether the National Radical Camp should be banned. While two other expert opinions supported banning the organisation, Jan Żaryn's Institute argued that there were no reasons to do so.

== Reactions ==
Nationalist circles and organisations supportive of the Law and Justice party have generally favoured the institute's creation. Jan Żaryn, in an interview to wnet.fm the day following announcement of plans to open the institute, stated that he received "many text messages and email letters with [words of] support and congratulations, part of which came from the young generation of nationalists". In July 2020, several conservative historians and activists expressed support in an open letter for the incumbent president, Andrzej Duda, and added that "thanks to the cooperation of the President and the government and amid decades of reluctance from subsequent governments of the Third Polish Republic, we at last return to the rich heritage of the nationalist politicians" and stressed that the Institute would promote the traditions of nationalism and Christian democracy.

Others have been critical of the idea and suggested that the real reasons were different, such as successful lobbying by the Polish far right and Catholic organisations, the will to create jobs for loyal cadres, the will to institutionalise the conservative thought, whitewashing of the Polish pre-war political right from anti-Semitism or otherwise participating in uncritical analysis of the legacy of conservative actors, or a political fight against Konfederacja, a party further to the right than PiS. These critics also pointed out that the newly created institution unnecessarily duplicates the role of the Institute of National Remembrance, and of the Polish Academy of Sciences and universities.
