= Foundation Work of the New Millennium =

Catholic youth organization in Poland

Work of the New Millennium
- Formation: 15 June 2000
- Type: foundation
- Headquarters: Skwer Kard, Wyszyńskiego 6 01-015 Warsaw
- Location: Poland
- Website: dzielo.pl

Foundation Work of the New Millennium (Polish: Fundacja Dzieło Nowego Tysiąclecia; FNDT) was established in 2000 in response by the Catholic Church in Poland to the words spoken by Pope John Paul II there in 1999. He noted the social changes at the turn of the year 1989, which were indispensable but also caused an increase in poverty. A conference of Poland's episcopate voted to create a foundation to help talented youth in the poorer areas of Poland.

The scholarship programme has been described as building a "living memorial of the Pope". The pilot programme included 500 pupils from five dioceses who were granted scholarships. During the following two years, the organisation expanded to almost all the dioceses in the country. Through 2024, FDNT provided scholarship benefits to 2,082 pupils and students. Scholarship-holders are a part of the formation aiming at Christian and civic maturity. The foundation organizes nationwide two-week holiday camps during which the high school pupils are familiarised with regions of Poland along with their cultural and scientific wealth.

The foundation also coordinates the celebrations of The Day of the Pope on the Sunday preceding John Paul II 's election to the papacy. FDNT awards the TOTUS prize to groups and individuals who promote human dignity.
