= Tadeusz Manteuffel Institute of History of the Polish Academy of Sciences =

Research institute in Warsaw, Poland

- Instytut Historii im. Tadeusza Manteuffla Polskiej Akademii Nauk
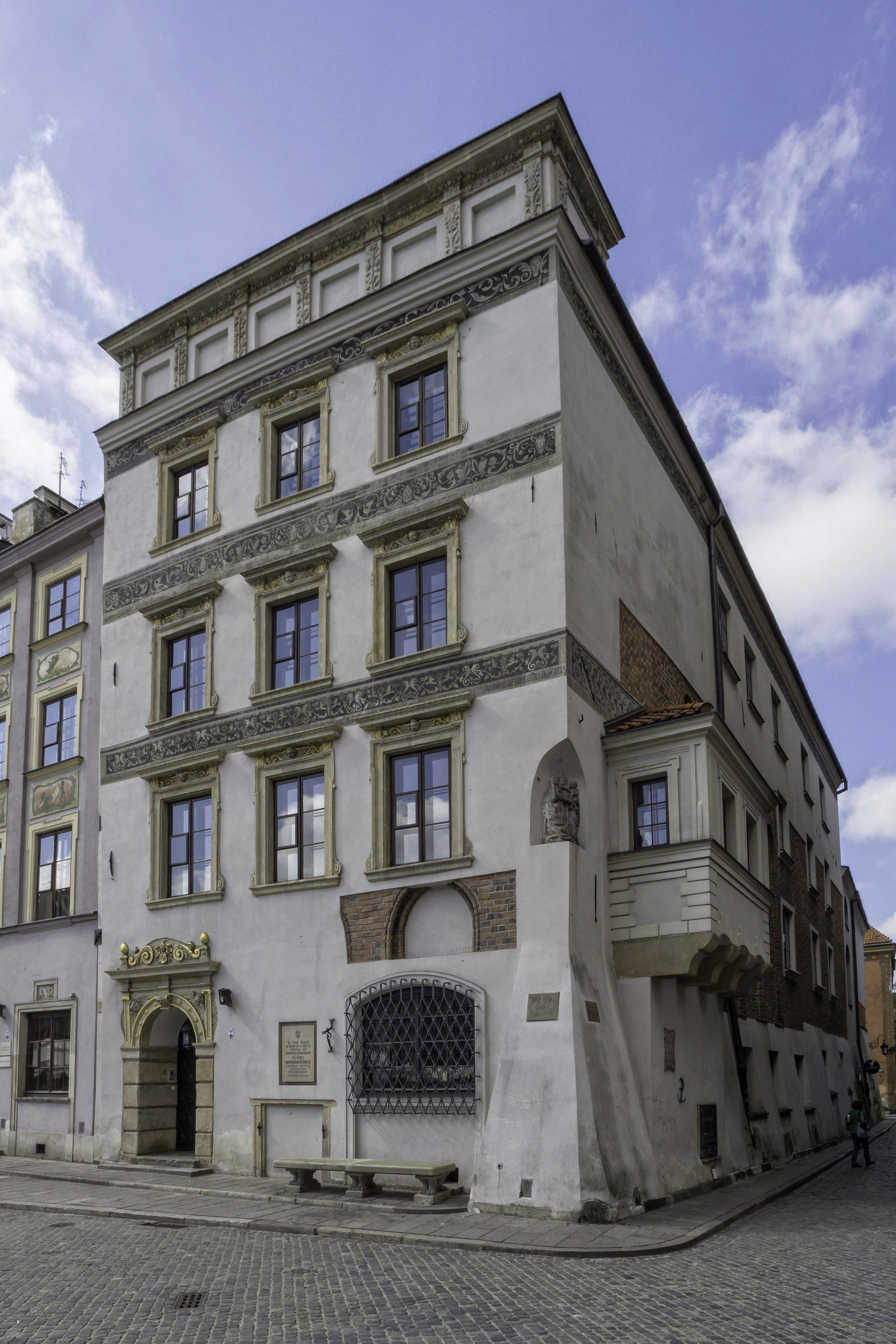
- Kamienica pod św. Anną w Warszawie, the headquarters of the institute
- Type: Scientific
- Established: 1953
- Location: Rynek Starego Miasta 31; 00-272 Warszawa, Warsaw, Poland
- Website: ihpan.edu.pl

The Tadeusz Manteuffel Institute of History of the Polish Academy of Sciences (Polish: Instytut Historii im. Tadeusza Manteuffla Polskiej Akademii Nauk, IH PAN) is a scientific Institute of the Polish Academy of Sciences, based in Warsaw.

== History ==
It was established in 1953. Tadeusz Manteuffel was its founder and first director. The Institute consists of twelve departments. IH PAN has branches in Gdańsk, Kraków, Poznań and Toruń. The institute conducts research on the history of Poland from the Middle Ages to the 20th century, as well as research on the history of Central and Eastern Europe.

Maciej Janowski was appointed the institute's director. Maciej Górny and Bartosz Kaliski were appointed deputy directors. Katarzyna Sierakowska was appointed Chairwoman of the Scientific Council of the institute.

== Scientific journals ==
The Institute of History of the Polish Academy of Sciences publishes (independently or in co-editing) scientific journals:

- Acta Poloniae Historica
- Kwartalnik Historyczny
- Czasopismo Prawno-Historyczne
- Dzieje Najnowsze
- Klio Polska
- Odrodzenie i Reformacja w Polsce
- Polska 1944/45–1989. Studia i materiały
- Rocznik Lituanistyczny
- Roczniki Dziejów Społecznych i Gospodarczych
- Roczniki Historyczne
- Studia z Dziejów Rosji i Europy Środkowo-Wschodniej
- Studia Źródłoznawcze
- Legatio: The Journal for Renaissance and Early Modern Diplomatic Studies

== Researchers ==
- Marek Daniel Kowalski
- Włodzimierz Tadeusz Kowalski
- Jan Żaryn
