= Krzysztof Skubiszewski =

Polish politician (1926–2010)

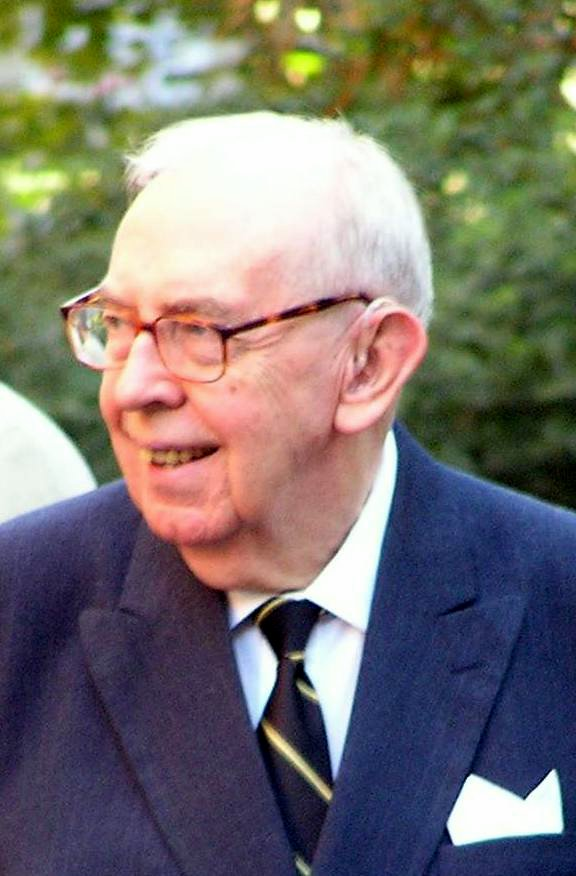

Minister of Foreign Affairs
- In office 12 September 1989 – 26 October 1993
- Prime Minister: Tadeusz Mazowiecki; Jan Krzysztof Bielecki; Jan Olszewski; Hanna Suchocka
- Preceded by: Tadeusz Olechowski
- Succeeded by: Andrzej Olechowski

Personal details
- Born: 8 October 1926 Poznań, Poland
- Died: 8 February 2010 (aged 83) Warsaw, Poland
- Party: Independent
- Education: Poznan University; Harvard University; Nancy University
- Profession: Lawyer

Krzysztof Jan Skubiszewski [ˈkʂɨʂtɔf skubʲiˈʂɛfskʲi] (8 October 1926 – 8 February 2010) was a Polish politician, a former Minister of Foreign Affairs (1989–1993) and an established scholar in the field of international law.

== Early life and education ==
Skubiszewski was born in Poznań on 8 October 1926. He attended high school in Warsaw. He held a law degree, which he received from Poznan University. He also attended Harvard University and Nancy University in France for postgraduate studies. He graduated from Harvard University in 1958.

== Career ==
Skubiszewski taught international law at his alma mater, Poznan University. He was an expert on Polish-German relations. He was a member of the Curatorium of The Hague Academy of International Law. He was a pioneer in scholarship on the law-making authority of international organizations. During the communist regime in the country he was an active member of the Solidarity movement.

After the fall of communism, he served in the successive cabinets of Tadeusz Mazowiecki, Jan Krzysztof Bielecki, Jan Olszewski and Hanna Suchocka and was the first minister of foreign affairs of the Third Republic of Poland. He was in office from 12 September 1989 to 26 October 1993. In 1992, Skubiszewski, together with 9 other ministers of foreign affairs from the Baltic Sea area, and an EU commissioner, founded the Council of the Baltic Sea States (CBSS) and the EuroFaculty.

He was awarded with the Order of the White Eagle, Poland's highest state decoration. In 1993, he was appointed an ad hoc judge in the International Court of Justice in the Hague. An acclaimed international lawyer, he served as the president of the Iran-United States Claims Tribunal there from 16 February 1994 until his death. In 2006 he was awarded by the French-German-Polish for French-German-Polish Committee together with the other two co-founders of the Weimar Triangle, the former Foreign Ministers Hans-Dietrich Genscher and Roland Dumas, the Adam-Mickiewicz Prize.

== Death and legacy ==
Skubiszewski died on 8 February 2010 at the age of 83. The Ministry of Foreign Affairs of the Republic of Poland initiated a scholarship and a research grant for the candidates from Central Europe, the Balkans, the Baltic States, Eastern Europe, Russia, Central Asia and the Caucasus for his memory in 2013.
