= Skubiszewski =

Skubiszewski may refer to:

- Cezary Skubiszewski (born 1949), Polish-Australian composer
- Jan Skubiszewski (born 1981), Australian producer and musician, son of Cezary
- Krzysztof Skubiszewski (1926–2010), Polish lawyer and politician, former foreign minister
- Viva Skubiszewski (Viva Bianca, born 1983), Australian actress, daughter of Cezary
