= History of Poland (1989–present) =

From 1989 through 1991, Poland engaged in a democratic transition, which put an end to the Polish People's Republic and led to the foundation of a democratic government, known as the Third Polish Republic (Polish: III Rzeczpospolita Polska), following the First and Second Polish Republic. After ten years of democratic consolidation, Poland joined NATO in 1999 and the European Union on 1 May 2004.

== Background ==
Tension grew between the people of Poland and its communist government, as with the rest of the Eastern bloc as the influence of the Soviet Union faded. With the advent of perestroika in the Soviet Union under Mikhail Gorbachev, the opportunity arose to change the system of government, after the harsh period of martial law (1981-83) imposed by general Wojciech Jaruzelski.

== Round Table Agreement and democratic transition ==
The government's inability to forestall Poland's economic decline led to waves of strikes across the country in April, May and August 1988. In an attempt to take control of the situation, the contemporary government gave de facto recognition to the Solidarity union, and Interior Minister Czesław Kiszczak began talks with Solidarity's leader Lech Wałęsa on 31 August. These talks broke down in October, but a new series of negotiations, the "round table" talks, began in February 1989. These talks produced an agreement in April for partly open parliamentary elections. The June election produced a Sejm (lower house), in which one-third of the seats went to the communist party and one-third went to the two parties which had hitherto been their coalition partners. The remaining one-third of the seats in the Sejm and all those in the Senate were freely contested; the majority of these were by candidates supported by Solidarity. The failure of the communist party at the polls produced a political crisis. The round-table agreement called for a communist president, and on 19 July, the National Assembly, with the support of a number of Solidarity deputies, elected General Wojciech Jaruzelski to that office. However, two attempts by the communists to form governments failed.

On 19 August, President Jaruzelski asked journalist/Solidarity activist Tadeusz Mazowiecki to form a government; on 12 September, the Sejm voted approval of Prime Minister Mazowiecki and his cabinet. For the first time in more than 40 years, Poland had a government led by non-communists.

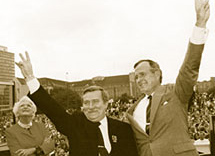
Wałęsa (center) with US President George H. W. Bush (right) and Barbara Bush (left) in Warsaw, July 1989.

In December 1989, the Sejm approved the government's reform program to transform the Polish economy rapidly from centrally planned to free-market, amended the constitution to eliminate references to the "leading role" of the Communist Party, and renamed the country the "Republic of Poland". The communist Polish United Workers' Party dissolved itself in January 1990, creating in its place a new party, Social Democracy of the Republic of Poland. Most of the property of the former Communist Party was turned over to the state.

The May 1990 local elections were entirely free. Candidates supported by Solidarity's Citizens' Committees won most of the elections they contested, although voter turnout was only a little over 40%. The cabinet was reshuffled in July 1990; the national defence and interior affairs ministers (hold-overs from the previous communist government) were among those replaced.

In October 1990, the constitution was amended to curtail the term of President Jaruzelski. In December, Lech Wałęsa became the first popularly elected President of Poland.

== Wałęsa Presidency (1990–1995) ==
In the early 1990s, Poland made progress towards achieving a democratic government and a market economy. In November 1990, Lech Wałęsa was elected president for a 5-year term. Jan Krzysztof Bielecki, at Wałęsa's request, formed a government and served as its prime minister until October 1991, introducing world prices and greatly expanding the scope of private enterprise.

Poland's first free parliamentary elections were held in 1991. More than 100 parties participated, representing the full spectrum of political views. No single party received more than 13% of the total vote. The government of Prime Minister Jan Olszewski was the first fully free and democratic Polish government since 1926. This cabinet was supported by the Kaczyński brothers. Olszewski was replaced by Hanna Suchocka as the first woman Prime Minister of Poland in 1992 after Janusz Korwin-Mikke wanted all members of the Sejm who had cooperated with the communist secret police to be revealed. After a rough start, 1993 saw the second group of elections, and the first parliament to serve a full term. The Democratic Left Alliance (SLD) received the largest share of votes. Also in 1993 the Soviet Northern Group of Forces finally left Poland.

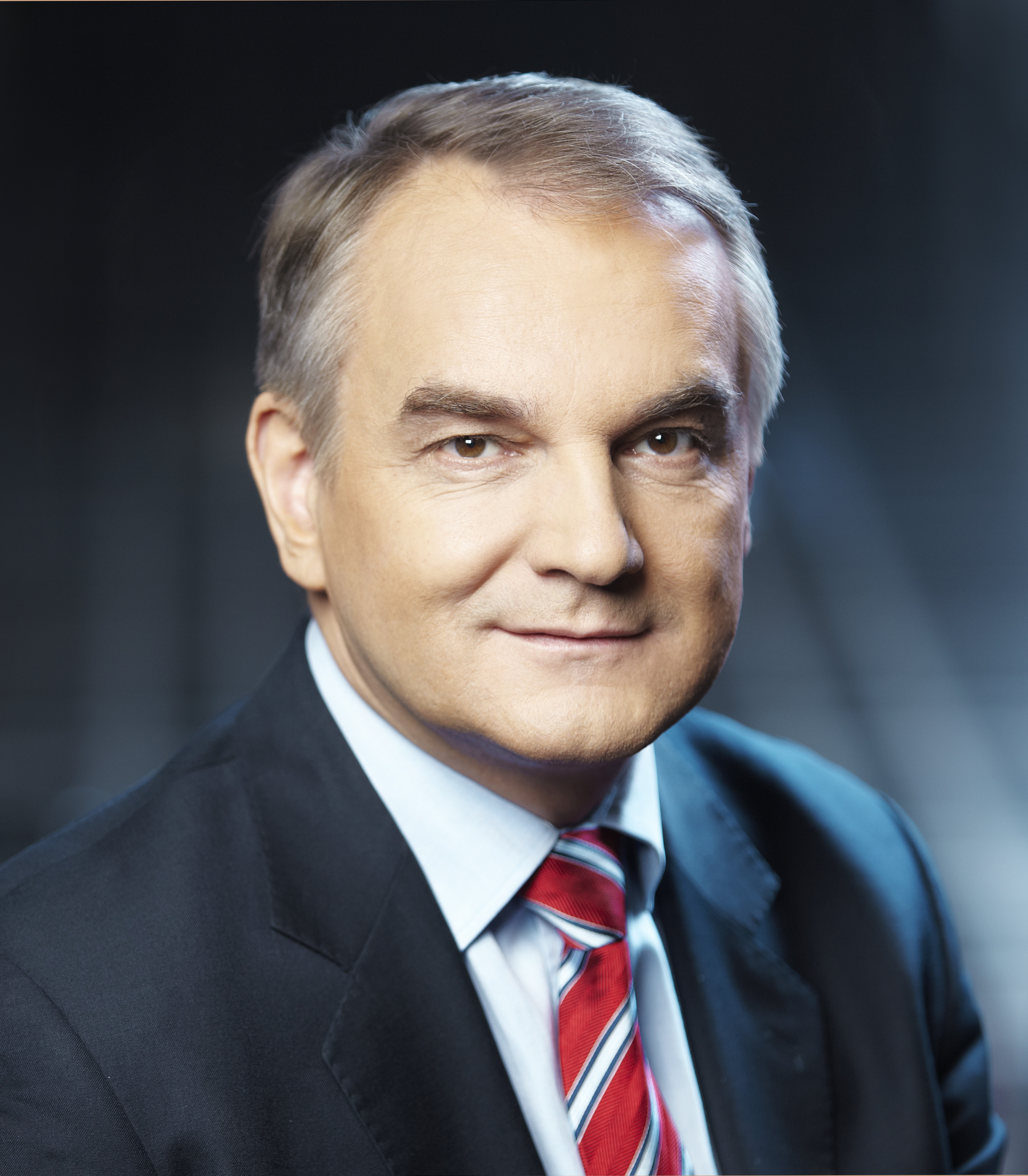
Waldemar Pawlak, Prime Minister (1993–95)

After the election, the SLD and Polish People's Party (PSL) formed a governing coalition. Waldemar Pawlak, leader of the junior partner PSL, became prime minister. Relations between President Wałęsa and the Prime Minister remained poor throughout the Pawlak government, with the President charging Pawlak with furthering personal and party interests while neglecting matters of state importance. Following a number of scandals implicating Pawlak and increasing political tension over control of the armed forces, Wałęsa demanded Pawlak's resignation in January 1995. A crisis resulted and the coalition removed Pawlak from office and replaced him with the SLD's Józef Oleksy as the new prime minister.

== Kwaśniewski Presidency (1995–2005) ==
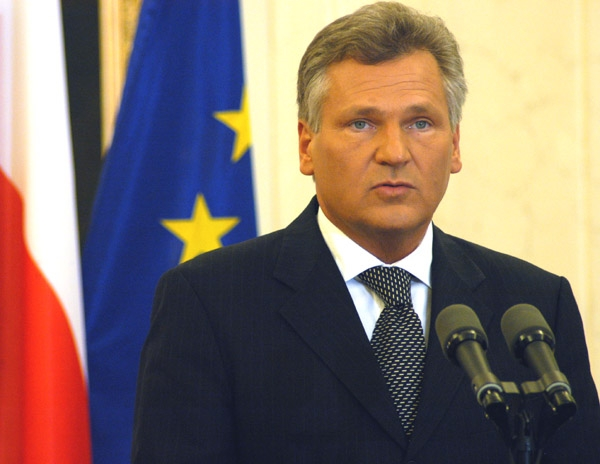
Aleksander Kwaśniewski (SLD), the only left-wing President of Poland since 1989 (1995–2005)

In November 1995, Poland held its second post-war free presidential elections. SLD leader Aleksander Kwaśniewski defeated Wałęsa by a narrow margin—51.7% to 48.3%. Soon after Wałęsa's defeat, Interior Minister Andrzej Milczanowski accused then-Prime Minister Oleksy of a longtime collaboration with Soviet and later Russian intelligence. In the ensuing political crisis, Oleksy resigned. For his successor, The SLD-PSL coalition turned to deputy Sejm speaker Włodzimierz Cimoszewicz — who was linked to, but not a member of, the SLD. Polish prosecutors subsequently decided that there was insufficient evidence to charge Oleksy, and a parliamentary commission decided in November 1996 that the Polish intelligence services may have violated rules of procedure in gathering evidence in the Oleksy case.

Poland's new Constitution of 1997 redefined the concept of the Polish nation in civic rather than ethnic terms. Article 35 guaranteed the rights of national and ethnic minorities, while other provisions prohibited discrimination and political organizations that spread racial hatred.

In 1997 parliamentary elections two parties with roots in the Solidarity movement — Solidarity Electoral Action (AWS) and the Freedom Union (UW) — won 261 of the 460 seats in the Sejm and formed a coalition government. Jerzy Buzek of the AWS became prime minister. The AWS and the Democratic Left Alliance (SLD) held the majority of the seats in the Sejm. Marian Krzaklewski was the leader of the AWS, and Leszek Miller led the SLD. In April 1997, the first post-communist Constitution of Poland was finalized, and in July put into effect. In June 2000, UW withdrew from the governing coalition, leaving AWS at the helm of a minority government.

In the presidential election of 2000, Aleksander Kwaśniewski, the incumbent former leader of the post-communist SLD, was re-elected in the first round of voting, with 53.9% of the popular vote. Second place, with only 17.3%, went to Andrzej Olechowski. It is thought that the opposition campaign was hindered by their inability to put forward a charismatic (or even a single major) candidate, as well as falling support for the centre-right AWS government. This was related to internal friction in the ruling parliamentary coalition.

The 1997 Constitution and the reformed administrative division of 1999 required a revision of the electoral system, which was passed in April 2001. The most important changes included:

1. the final liquidation of the party list (previously, some of the members of parliament were elected from a party list, based on nationwide voter support, rather than from local constituencies),
2. modification of the method of allocating seats to the Sainte-Laguë method, which gave less premium to large parties. The latter change was reverted to the d'Hondt method in 2002.

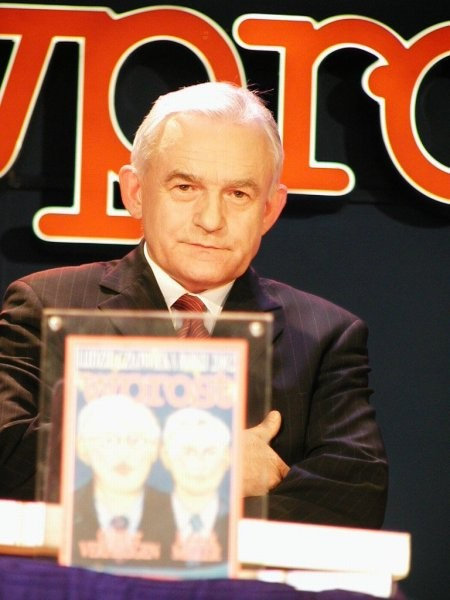
Leszek Miller, Prime Minister (2001–04)

In the September 2001 parliamentary elections, the SLD triumphed on the back of voter disillusionment with the AWS government and internal bickering within that bloc. So much so that this former ruling party did not enter parliament due to falling below the 8% threshold for coalitions. (Symptomatically, they had failed to form a formal political party, which has only a 5% threshold, and formally remained a "coalition" of parties).

The SLD went on to form a coalition with the agrarian PSL and leftist Labour Union (UP), with Leszek Miller as prime minister. This government had the support of 256 of the 460 seats in the Sejm.

A leading issue in the subsequent years was negotiations with the European Union regarding accession and internal preparation for this. Poland joined the EU on 1 May 2004. Both President Kwaśniewski and the government were vocal in their support for this cause. The only party decidedly opposed to EU entry was the populist right-wing League of Polish Families (LPR).

Despite broad popular support for joining the EU, which was considered an overriding issue, the government rapidly lost popularity due to incompetence on various issues (e.g. building of motorways, and a botched reform of the health system and numerous corruption scandals). The most famous of these were the Rywin affair (an alleged attempt to interfere with the legislative process, so named after the main suspect Lew Rywin) -- this case was investigated by a special parliamentary committee, whose proceedings were televised and widely followed), and the Starachowice affair (government ministers informed friends with links to an organized crime about an impending raid).

In March some prominent SLD politicians and MPs (including the then Speaker of the Sejm: Marek Borowski) formed a split, creating the new Social Democracy of Poland party. The cabinet led by Leszek Miller resigned on 2 May 2004, just after Poland joined the European Union.

A new cabinet was formed, with Marek Belka as prime minister. After two initial unsuccessful attempts, it eventually won parliamentary support (24 June) and governed until the parliamentary elections in late 2005. Several of the new ministers were seen as non-partisan experts, and the government was considered a marked improvement upon the previous cabinet. This did not carry over into any rise in voter support for the SLD, however, even despite an economic upturn through 2005. Part of the reason is that this government was considered to be largely apart from the party backbone, and only held in an office by the fear of early elections by the majority of the MPs.

A fear not unfounded, as the SLD saw its support drop by three-fourths to only 11% in the subsequent elections.

== Lech Kaczyński Presidency (2005–2010) ==
=== PiS-led coalition government (2005–2007) ===
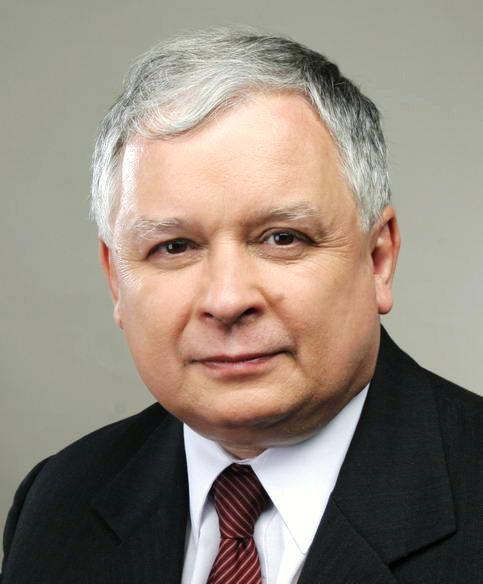
Lech Kaczyński, the 3rd President of Poland (2005–10)

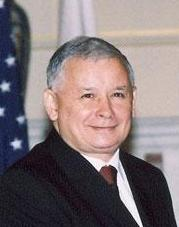
Jarosław Kaczyński, the leader of the Law and Justice and Prime Minister of Poland (2006–07)

In the autumn of 2005 Poles voted in both parliamentary and presidential elections. September's parliamentary poll was expected to produce a coalition of two centre-right parties, PiS (Law and Justice) and PO (Civic Platform). During the increasingly bitter campaign, however, PiS launched a strong attack on the liberal economic policies of their allies and overtook PO in opinion polls. PiS eventually gained 27% of votes cast and became the largest party in the Sejm ahead of PO on 24%. The out-going ruling party, the social democratic SLD, achieved just 11%. This continues the trend that in every free parliamentary election the Polish electorate has voted against the current government, turning to the left in 1993 and 2001, and to the right in 1997 and 2005.

Presidential elections in October followed a similar script. The early favourite, Donald Tusk, leader of the PO, saw his opinion poll lead slip away and was beaten 54% to 46% in the second round by the PiS candidate Lech Kaczyński (one of the twins, founders of the party).

Both elections were blighted by low turn-outs: only 51% in the second and deciding round of the presidential election and just over 40% in the parliamentary election. The suggested cause of the low turnout is popular disillusionment with politicians.

Coalition talks ensued simultaneously with the presidential elections. However, the severity of the campaign attacks and the willingness of PiS to court the populist vote had soured the relationship between the two largest parties and made the creation of a stable coalition impossible. The ostensible stumbling blocks were the insistence of PiS that it controls all aspects of law enforcement: the Ministries of Justice and Internal Affairs, and the special forces; as well as the forcing through of a PiS candidate for the head of the Sejm with help of several smaller populist parties. The PO decided to go into opposition.

PiS then formed a minority government with the previously little-known Kazimierz Marcinkiewicz as prime minister instead of party leader, Jarosław Kaczyński who remained influential in the background. This government relied on the tacit and rather stable support of smaller populist and agrarian parties (Samoobrona, LPR) to govern.

The new government enjoyed quite strong public support (which was expected during the first few months after the election), while the popularity of the populist parties giving it support, significantly waned. A parliamentary crisis appeared to loom in January 2006, with these small populist parties fearing that PiS was about to force new elections (on which they would lose out) by using the pretext of failing to pass the budget within the constitutional timeframe. However, a crisis was abated.

In May 2006 a coalition agreement for the majority government was formed between PiS, Samoobrona and League of Polish Families (LPR). In July 2006, following a rift with his party leader, Jarosław Kaczyński, Marcinkiewicz tendered his resignation as prime minister and was replaced by Jarosław Kaczyński. The following 15 months were erratic and not without controversy, as the government pursued lustration policies, established a Central Anticorruption Bureau with far-reaching powers and was embroiled in a case relating to the suicide of an MP who was under investigation for corruption. The new government also modified Polish foreign relations relating to the EU by adopting a more eurosceptical stance, where Polish governments had in the past adopted a very pro-EU position.

The uneasy alliance between the three coalition partners came to a head in July 2007 when Samoobrona leader, Andrzej Lepper, was dismissed from his position as Minister for Agriculture following a secret investigation by the Central Anticorruption Bureau (CBA) which attempted to link him and his department to corruptive practices. Lepper protested his innocence and claimed to have been the victim of a politically motivated 'sting' operation, initiated by PM Kaczynski and PiS. The coalition agreement collapsed over the following month, with both the LPR and Samoobrona levelling accusations against PiS. In September, the Sejm voted to dissolve itself (supported by PiS but opposed by Samoobrona and LPR), paving the way for elections in October.

=== First Donald Tusk government (2007–2014) ===
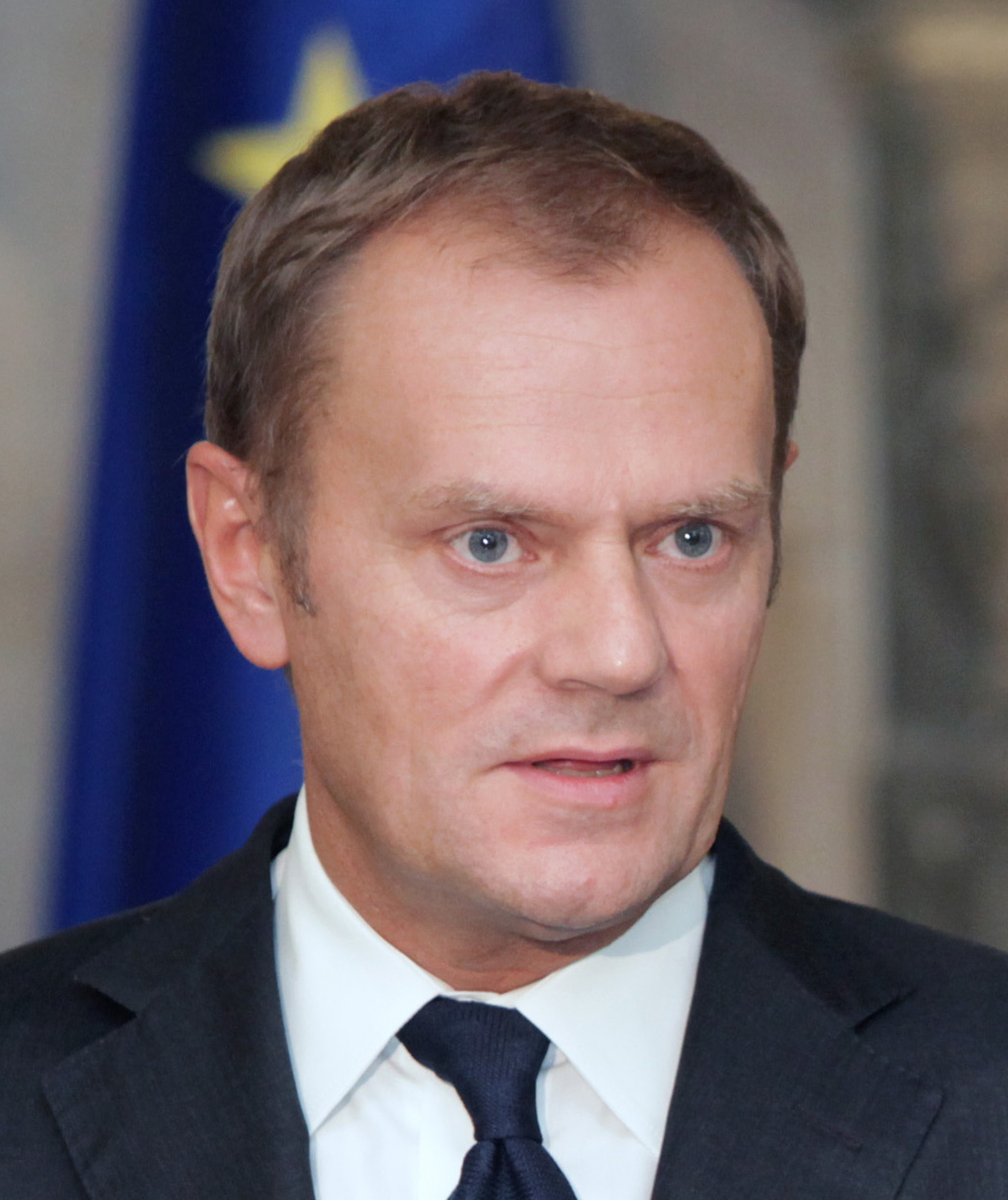
Donald Tusk, the leader of Civic Platform and Prime Minister (2007–14), he was the first prime minister to be reelected, in 2014 he became the President of the European Council.

In the October parliamentary elections, the Civic Platform (PO), the largest opposition party, gained more than 41% of the popular vote. PiS's vote increased, from 2005, but insufficiently to gain reelection, whilst both Samoobrona and LPR lost all representation, each having gained only a little over 1% of the vote. PO proceeded to form a majority governing coalition with the agrarian Polish People's Party (PSL), with PO leader, Donald Tusk, taking over the prime ministerial office in November 2007.

On 14 August 2008, the United States and Poland agreed to have 10, two-stage Orbital Sciences Corp missile interceptors placed in Poland, as part of a missile shield to defend Europe and the US from a possible missile attack by Iran. In return, the US agreed to move a battery of MIM-104 Patriot missiles to Poland. The missile battery would be staffed - at least temporarily - by US Military personnel. The US also pledged to defend Poland - a NATO member - quicker than NATO would in the event of an attack. After the agreement was announced, Russian officials - who viewed the missile shield as a threat - released a statement indirectly threatening Poland, and said that the missile defence system would greatly harm future US/Russia relations.

Russia later threatened nuclear attack against "new US assets in Europe", referring to Poland. The US has pledged to back Warsaw in the event of Russian aggression towards Poland.

== Komorowski Presidency (2010–2015) ==
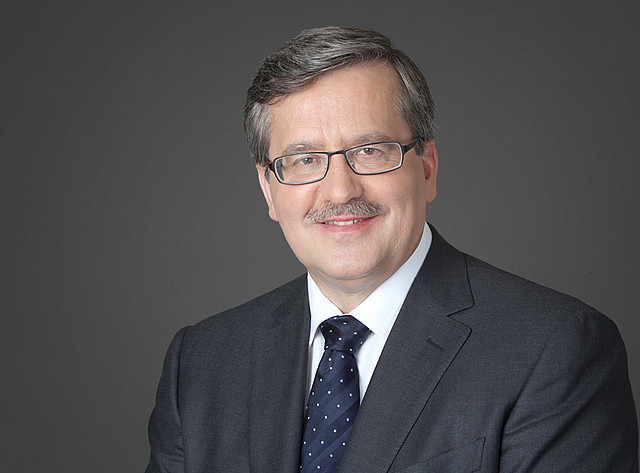
Bronisław Komorowski, 4th President of Poland (2010–15)

On 10 April 2010, numerous high-ranking Polish statesmen died in the Smolensk air crash, including Lech Kaczyński, the President of Poland at the time. At the 2010 Polish presidential election, Donald Tusk decided not to stand. At PO primary elections, Bronisław Komorowski defeated the Foreign Minister Radosław Sikorski, at the second round of voting on 4 July 2010, he defeated PiS's Jarosław Kaczyński. and on 6 August 2010 he was sworn in as president. At the November 2010 local elections, PO won 31 percent of the votes and PiS 23 percent, an increase for the former and a drop for the latter compared to the 2006 elections.

In October 2011, Donald Tusk became the first ever Polish Prime Minister to be re-elected in post-communist Poland. PO won a record of four consecutive elections. PO's dominance was seen as a reflection of right-wing divisions, with PiS splitting in autumn 2010.

== Duda Presidency (2015–2025) ==
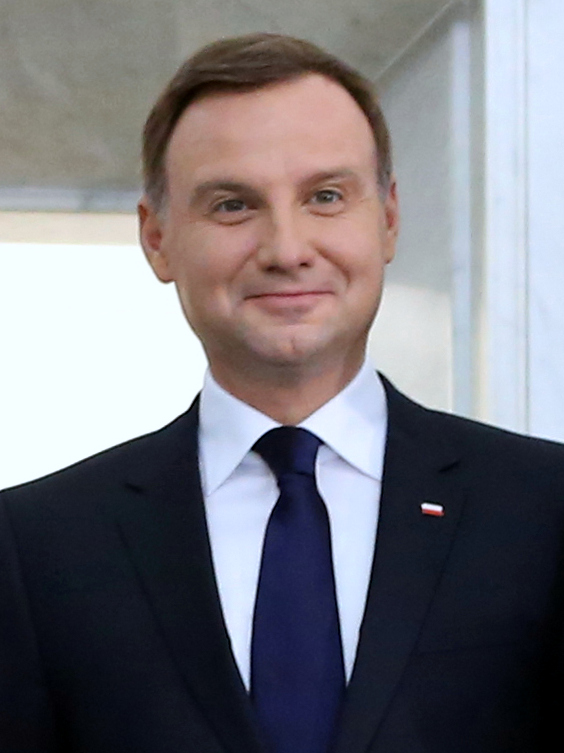
Andrzej Duda, President of Poland (2015–2025)

After two rounds of elections in May 2015, opposition Law and Justice (PiS) candidate Andrzej Duda became president by a 3% margin. In October 2015, the PiS won the simple majority in the Sejm, was able to form the first single-party government since the fall of communism in 1989.

Since the PiS control the presidency and have the majority in both houses, it aims to make judiciary reforms in the Constitutional Court. (See Polish Constitutional Court crisis, 2015)

In the context of rising tensions with the EU, the Polish government is being accused of leading Poland towards democratic backsliding. Media outlets fully controlled by capital from outside the EU are now facing the risk to sell parts of their Polish channels, as is already common in other EU countries (like Germany or France). As there are no legal objections, critics and the primarily concerned US mass media outlet (Discovery, Inc.) raise that this would be an attack on the expression of free speech. The newly appointed US ambassador Mark Brzezinski stated that he is concerned by this and plans to support freedom of speech.

In December 2017, Mateusz Morawiecki was sworn in as the new prime minister, succeeding Beata Szydlo, in office since 2015. They both represented the ruling Law and Justice party, led by Jaroslaw Kaczynski.

Poland's governing Law and Justice party (PiS) won the parliamentary election in October 2019.

Duda was re-elected in the 2020 presidential election.

On 27 December 2021, Duda vetoed Lex TVN bill, a PiS government bill to counter foreign ownership in Polish media.

Poland has been one of neighbouring Ukraine's most ardent supporters after the 2022 Russian invasion of Ukraine. As of November 2022, Poland had received more than 1.5 million Ukrainian refugees since the beginning of the war. In September 2023, however, Poland said that it will stop supplying arms to Ukraine and instead focus on its own defense. Poland's decision to ban importing Ukrainian grain, in order to protect its own farmers, had caused tension between the two countries.

In October 2023, the ruling Law and Justice (PiS) party won the largest share of the vote in the election, but lost its majority in parliament. In December 2023, Donald Tusk became the new prime minister to succeed Morawiecki, leading a coalition of three parliamentary groups made up of Civic Coalition, Third Way, and The Left. Law and Justice became the leading opposition party.

=== Second Donald Tusk government (2023–present) ===
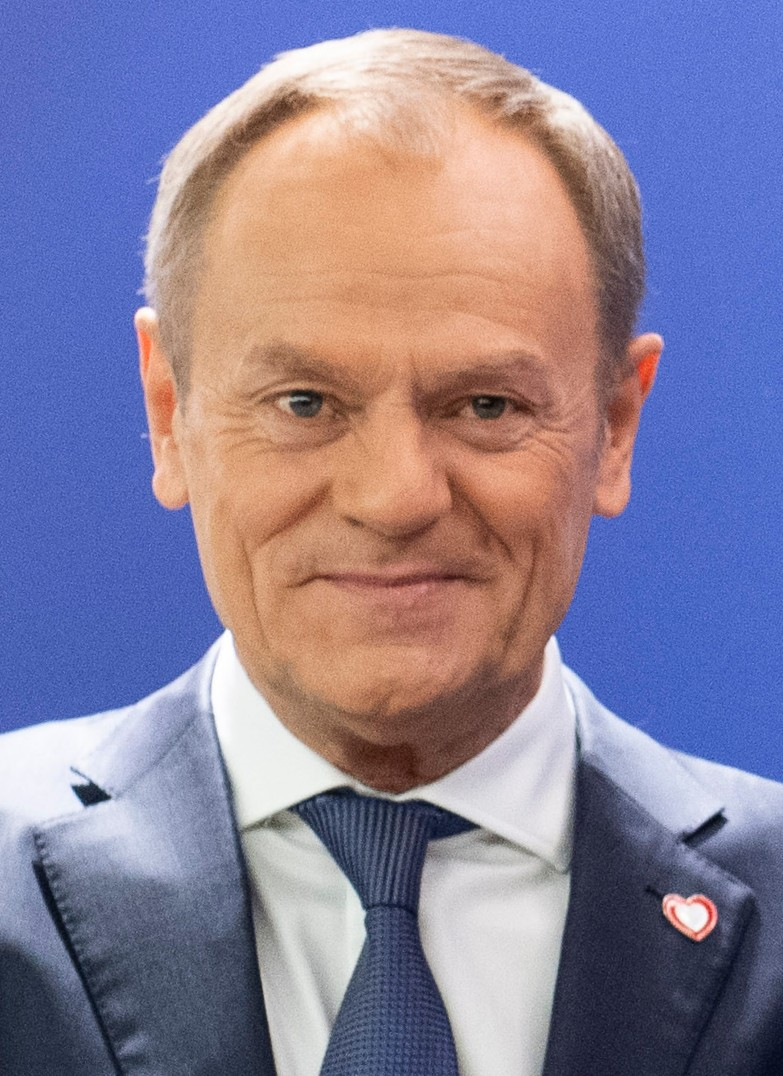
Donald Tusk, the leader of Civic Coalition and Prime Minister between (2007–2014), he was the first prime minister to be reelected, between 2014–2019 he was the President of the European Council.

The United Right alliance placed first for the third straight election and won a plurality of seats but fell short of a Sejm majority. The opposition, consisting of the Civic Coalition, Third Way, and The Left, achieved a combined total vote of 54%, managing to form a majority coalition government. On 10 November, Civic Coalition, Poland 2050, Polish People's Party and New Left signed a coalition agreement with Tusk as their candidate for prime minister. The opposition parties wanted to sign the agreement before the Sejm's first sitting in order to show that they stood ready to govern. Morawiecki was required to secure the Sejm's confidence within two weeks of being sworn in. Under the Constitution, if Morawiecki failed to do so, the Sejm would then designate its own candidate for prime minister, and Duda would be required to appoint that candidate before 11 December. Most commentators expected Morawiecki to come up short of the support needed to govern, as no other party willing to go into coalition with PiS would give it enough support to command the confidence of the Sejm. On 27 November, Mateusz Morawiecki was sworn in by President Duda for an unprecedented third term as prime minister. His cabinet had been mockingly dubbed the "Two Weeks Government" by Polish media due to its low likelihood of passing the confidence vote. On 11 December, Morawiecki's caretaker cabinet lost a vote of confidence in the Sejm by 190 votes to 266. Later that day, the Sejm nominated Tusk for prime minister, who was subsequently confirmed by 248 votes in favour and 201 against. Tusk's cabinet was sworn in on 13 December.

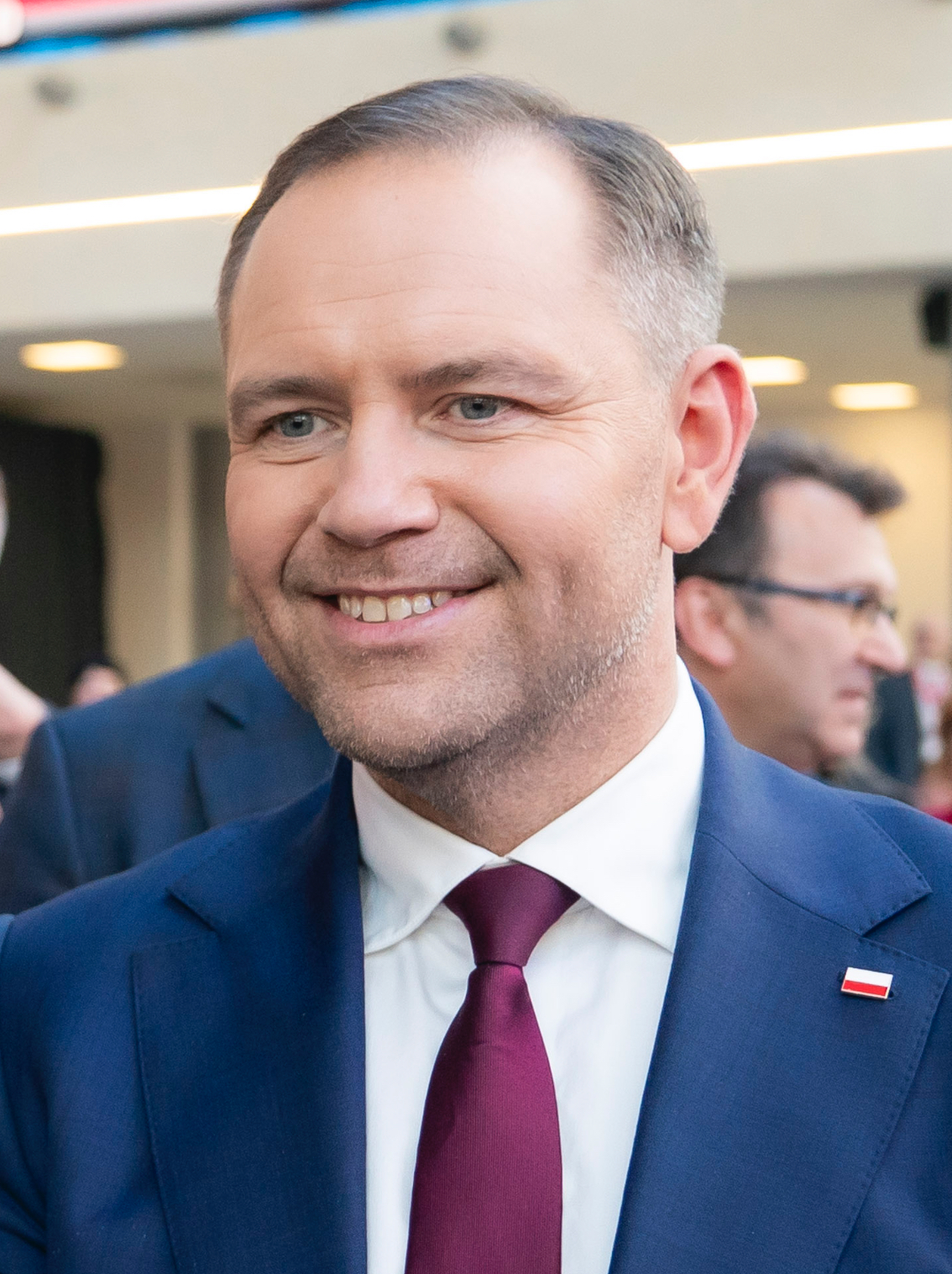
Karol Nawrocki, former director of the Institute of National Remembrance and the current president of Poland.

The new government enjoyed quite strong public support (which was expected during the first few months after the election), while the popularity of the minor parties giving it support, significantly waned. The October 15 Coalition, included plans to reform state media in their coalition agreement. On 19 December 2023, the Sejm passed a resolution on "restoring the legal order and the impartiality and integrity of the public media and the Polish Press Agency" with 244 votes in favor. There were 84 votes against and 16 abstentions. More than 100 Law and Justice deputies did not participate in the vote, having instead gone to the TVP headquarters to protest the change.

On the same day, Bartłomiej Sienkiewicz dismissed the authorities of public media, including TVP. Newly appointed TVP supervisory board would then designate Tomasz Sygut to be TVP's new CEO.

The uneasy alliance between the three coalition partners came to difficult points when it comes to abortion, civil unions (which in the end became a government bill) or health insurance contribution.

On 1 June 2025, The Law and Justice candidate for the 2025 Polish presidential election, Karol Nawrocki won the election, beating Civic Platform candidate Rafał Trzaskowski. The results continued the streak of Law and Justice aligned presidential candidates only losing one presidential election in 2010 since its founding in 2001.

== See also ==
- Politics of Poland
- Fourth Polish Republic
