= Tadeusz Wilecki =

Polish general

- Born: 20 March 1945 (age 81); Wielkie, Poland
- Alma mater: Świerczewski General Staff Academy; Soviet General Staff Military Academy
- Military career
- Rank: Generał broni
- Commands: Chief of the General Staff of the Polish Army

Tadeusz Adam Wilecki (born 20 March 1945 in Wielkie), also known as Tadeusz Wałach, is a Generał broni, Chief of the General Staff of the Polish Armed Forces from 1992 to 1997. He was a candidate for the office of President of Poland in the 2000 presidential election.

== Biography ==
Son of Jan. In 1963, he graduated from the Słowacki 1st High School in Oleśnica. In 1967, he graduated from the Armored Forces Officers' School in Poznań. He was a platoon commander, and later a tank company commander, in the 25th Mechanized Regiment in Opole. From 1971 to 1974, he studied at the Świerczewski General Staff Academy. From 1976 to 1979, he was commander of the 18th Medium Tank Regiment. In 1979, he was appointed deputy commander for line affairs of the 10th Sudeten Armoured Division. From 1980 to 1982, he studied at the Soviet General Staff Military Academy. From 1982 to 1984, he served as chief of staff, and from 1984 to 1986 as commander of the 5th Saxon Armoured Division. He was also a member of the executive branch of the Provincial Committee of the Polish United Workers' Party in Zielona Góra. In 1987, he was promoted to the rank of brigadier general.

From 1987 to 1989, he served as chief of staff and deputy commander of the Silesian Military District. In September 1989, he was appointed commander of the Silesian Military District. In 1990, he was promoted to the rank of major general. In August 1992, President Lech Wałęsa, at the request of Minister of National Defense Janusz Onyszkiewicz, appointed him Chief of the General Staff of the Polish Armed Forces. He participated in the so-called Drawsko Dinner. His role in those events was described in detail by the weekly "Przegląd":

Wilecki and Malejczyk were among the most important chefs preparing the infamous "Drawsko Dinner." They were immersed in the affair up to their epaulettes. They were Wałęsa's closest supporters, who were striving for complete power in Poland. One of the most important goals in this endeavor was to remove the Military Information Services from the authority and control of the Minister of National Defense – then Piotr Kołodziejczyk – and subordinate them to the Chief of the General Staff.

In 1992, he was promoted to the rank of Lieutenant General. In March 1997, President Aleksander Kwaśniewski dismissed him from his position. In June 1998, he was released from professional military service and retired.

In 1996, he was a member of a group of generals who co-founded the Generals' Club of the Polish Army.

After retirement, he became one of the patrons of the Committee for the Construction of the monoument for Roman Dmowski. In the 2000 presidential election, he ran for president on behalf of the National Party, with the support of the Warsaw Family party, then led by Roman Giertych. He received 0.16% of the vote, resulting in 28,805 votes and a penultimate, 11th-place finish.

In 2008, he was one of the co-founders of the Pro Milito Association, of which he was subsequently elected president. He also serves on the supervisory boards of G & O Group (since 2005) and Euromet Holding (since 2014).

He lives in Warsaw. He has been married to Maryla, a teacher, since 1972. The couple has a daughter and a son.
