= Ciotcza =

- Village
- Location within Poland
- Coordinates: 51°30′N 22°20′E
- Country: Poland
- Voivodeship: Lublin
- County: Lubartów
- Gmina: Abramów

Population
  - Total: 415

Ciotcza [ˈt͡ɕɔtt͡ʂa] is a village in the administrative district of Gmina Abramów, within Lubartów County, Lublin Voivodeship, in eastern Poland.

In 2005, the village had a population of 415.
