= Marcinów, Lublin Voivodeship =

Marcinów
- Village
- Location within Poland
- Coordinates: 51°28′7″N 22°17′28″E
- Country: Poland
- Voivodeship: Lublin
- County: Lubartów
- Gmina: Abramów

Population
  - Total: 257
- Time zone: UTC+1 (CET)
  - Summer (DST): UTC+2 (CEST)

Marcinów [marˈt͡ɕinuf] is a village in the administrative district of Gmina Abramów, within Lubartów County, Lublin Voivodeship, in eastern Poland.

In 2005 the village had a population of 257.

== History ==
16 Polish citizens were murdered by Nazi Germany in the village during World War II.
