= Gmina Abramów =

Administrative district in Lublin Voivodeship, Poland

Gmina Abramów Abramów Commune
- Gmina
- Flag Coat of arms

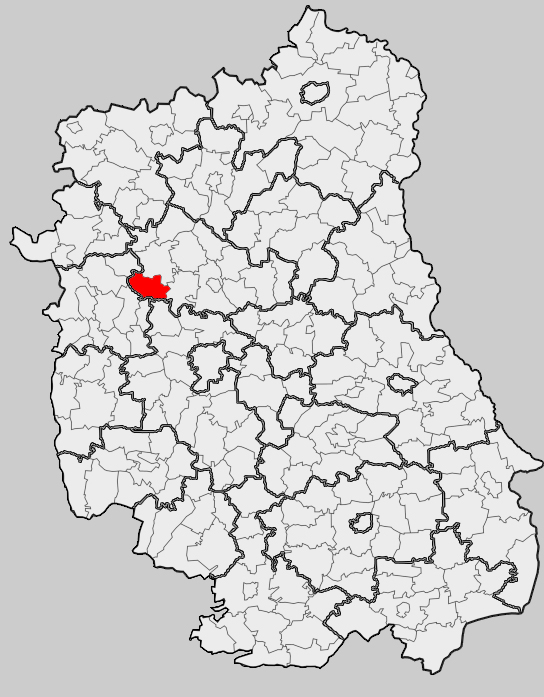
- Location within the county and voivodeship
- Coordinates (Abramów): 51°27′20″N 22°19′0″E
- Country: Poland
- Voivodeship: Lublin
- County: Lubartów
- Seat: Abramów

Area
  - Total: 84.54 km^{2} (32.64 sq mi)

Population (2014)
  - Total: 4,182
  - Density: 49.47/km^{2} (128.1/sq mi)
- Website: http://www.abramow.pl/

Gmina Abramów is a rural gmina (administrative district) in Lubartów County, Lublin Voivodeship, in eastern Poland. Its seat is the village of Abramów, which lies approximately 20 kilometres (12 mi) west of Lubartów and 29 km (18 mi) north-west of the regional capital Lublin.

The gmina covers an area of 84.54 square kilometres (32.6 sq mi), and as of 2006 its total population is 4,309 (4,182 in 2014).

== Neighbouring gminas ==
Gmina Abramów is bordered by the gminas of Baranów, Garbów, Kamionka, Kurów, Markuszów, Michów, and Żyrzyn.

== Villages ==
The gmina contains the villages of Abramów, Ciotcza, Dębiny, Glinnik, Izabelmont, Marcinów, Michałówka, Sosnówka, Wielkie, Wielkolas, and Wolica.
