= Stanisław Koziej =

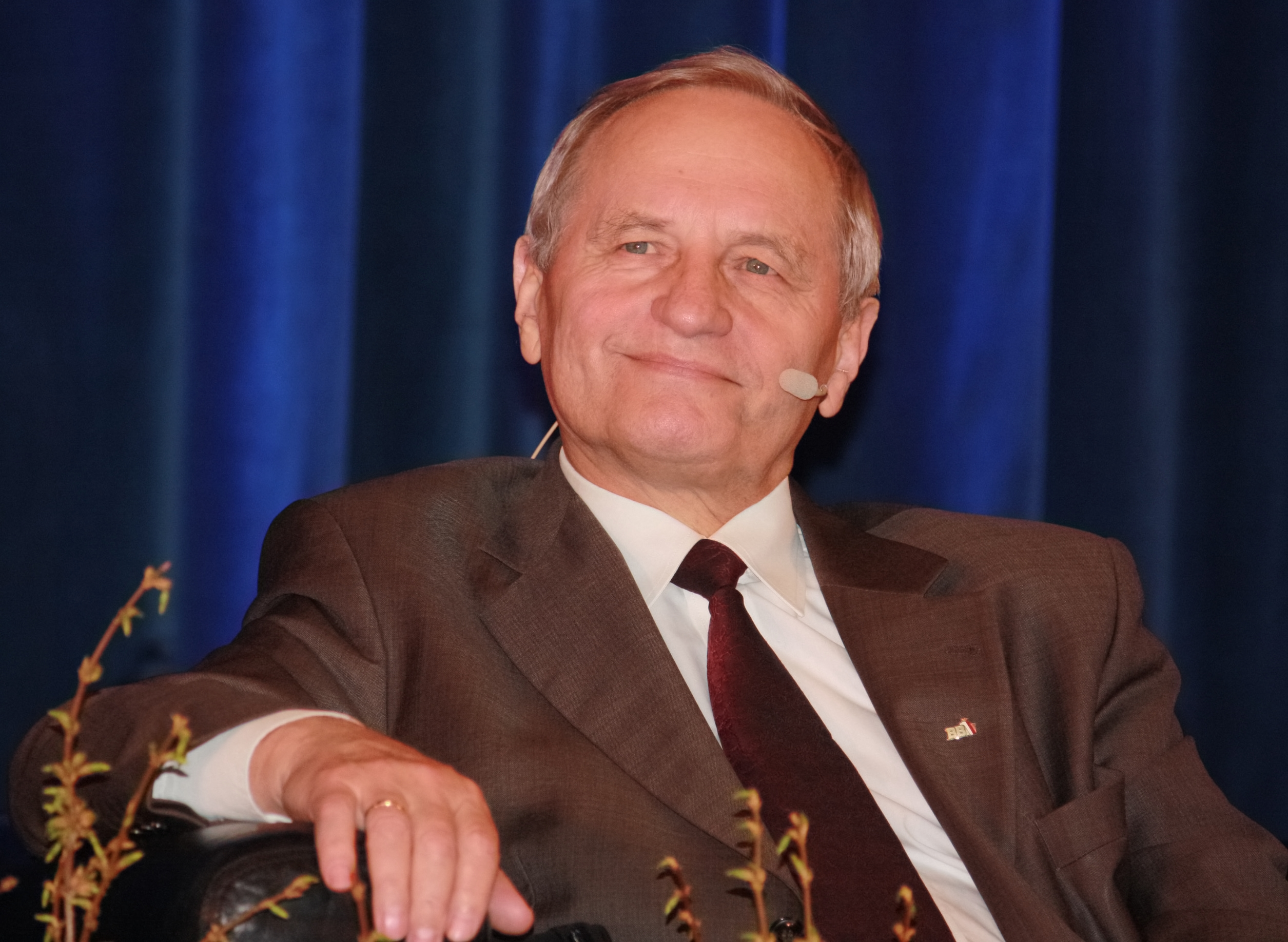
General Koziej in 2016

Stanisław Marian Koziej (born 1943, Glinnik, Poland) is a Polish brigadier general, military science professor, and public official who served as the Head of the National Security Bureau from 2010 to 2015.

== Biography ==
Koziej was educated at the Institut des hautes études de défense nationale and at the NATO Defense College. He holds a doctorate and a habilitation. Since 1990 Koziej is a professor of military science.

He is a longtime research fellow of the Academy of the General Staff and then the National Defence University. He has been the Dean of the faculty. He has also been a full professor at the Department of Strategic and Defence Studies at National Defence University and the Director of the National Security Institute at the College of Personnel Management in Warsaw.

From April 1993 to January 1994 he was the Director of the Department of Defence Systems at the National Security Bureau. On 11 November 1993 President Lech Wałęsa promoted him to brigadier general.

From 1994 to 2001 Koziej was the Director of the Department of Defence Systems at the Ministry of Defence. He served as the Head of the Polish Mission to the Neutral Nations Supervisory Commission from 1996 to 1997. Then for a year he was the Deputy Head of the Organization for Security and Co-operation in Europe Mission in Georgia. From 1999 to 2001 Koziej represented Poland in NATO regarding nuclear strategy.

In the parliamentary elections in 2005 Koziej ran unsuccessfully for the Senate as the Civic Platform’s nominee. On 7 November 2005 he was appointed Deputy Minister of Defence. He resigned on 26 July 2006. He was one of the authors of the Polish defense doctrine and has written several hundred publications in the field of military science.

On 13 April 2010 President Bronisław Komorowski appointed Koziej as Head of the National Security Bureau, and Secretary of State in the Chancellery of the President. He was appointed to the National Security Council on 20 May 2010. On 6 August 2015 Koziej resigned from the National Security Bureau.

Koziej presently teaches at the Faculty of Economics and Management of Lazarski University, a private institution in Warsaw. One of his research areas is international security.

== Awards ==
Koziej has received numerous honors and awards, including the Order of Polonia Restituta, Royal Norwegian Order of Merit, Order of Viesturs, Legion of Honour, Order of the Cross of Terra Mariana, and the Order of Merit of the Italian Republic.
