= Michałówka, Lubartów County =

Michałówka
- Village
- Location within Poland
- Coordinates: 51°27′16″N 22°22′13″E
- Country: Poland
- Voivodeship: Lublin
- County: Lubartów
- Gmina: Abramów

Population
  - Total: 284

Michałówka [mixaˈwufka] is a village in the administrative district of Gmina Abramów, within Lubartów County, Lublin Voivodeship, in eastern Poland.
