= Izabelmont =

- Village
- Location within Poland
- Coordinates: 51°28′N 22°15′E
- Country: Poland
- Voivodeship: Lublin
- County: Lubartów
- Gmina: Abramów

Population
  - Total: 120

Izabelmont [izaˈbɛlmɔnt] is a village in the administrative district of Gmina Abramów, within Lubartów County, Lublin Voivodeship, in eastern Poland.

In 2005 the village had a population of 120.

== History ==
=== World War II ===
On 17 May 1943, Izabelmont and other villages in the region were subjected to a reprisal action by the Wehrmacht, which deployed mostly Ostlegionen consisting of Armenian POWs but also some German battalions. The pacification action was undertaken in response to partisan activity against German offices in the region, and involved both prearranged arrest of most of the men in the village and the mass rape of local women.
