= Glinnik, Lublin Voivodeship =

Glinnik
- Village
- Location within Poland
- Coordinates: 51°26′41″N 22°16′20″E
- Country: Poland
- Voivodeship: Lublin
- County: Lubartów
- Gmina: Abramów

Population
  - Total: 459

Glinnik [ˈɡlinnik] is a village in the administrative district of Gmina Abramów, within Lubartów County, Lublin Voivodeship, in eastern Poland.

In 2005 the village had a population of 459.

== Notable people ==
- Stanisław Koziej (born 1943), Polish brigadier general.
