= Abramów, Lubartów County =

Abramów
- Village
- Location within Poland
- Coordinates: 51°27′23″N 22°18′55″E
- Country: Poland
- Voivodeship: Lublin
- County: Lubartów
- Gmina: Abramów

Population
  - Total: 713

Abramów ([aˈbramuf]) is a village in Lubartów County, Lublin Voivodeship, in eastern Poland. It is the seat of the gmina (administrative district) called Gmina Abramów.
