= Wolica, Lubartów County =

Wolica
- Village
- Location within Poland
- Coordinates: 51°28′N 22°13′E
- Country: Poland
- Voivodeship: Lublin
- County: Lubartów
- Gmina: Abramów

Population
  - Total: 610

Wolica [vɔˈlit͡sa] is a village in the administrative district of Gmina Abramów, within Lubartów County, Lublin Voivodeship, in eastern Poland.

In 2005 the village had a population of 610.
