= Christian Democracy of the Third Polish Republic =

Polish political party

Christian Democracy of the Third Polish Republic Chrześcijańska Demokracja III Rzeczypospolitej Polskiej
- Abbreviation: ChDRP
- Chairman: Lech Wałęsa
- Founders: Lech Wałęsa
- Founded: 1997, 2004
- Dissolved: 2003, 2023
- Headquarters: Warsaw
- Ideology: Christian democracy
- Political position: Centre

The Christian Democracy of the Third Polish Republic (Polish: Chrześcijańska Demokracja III Rzeczypospolitej Polskiej, ChD III RP or ChDRP) was a Polish political party created in 1997 by former Solidarity leader and Polish president Lech Wałęsa. He stood as the party's candidate in the 2000 presidential election but received only 1% of the vote. It never gained substantial support.

== History ==
The former president announced the establishment of the new formation in the autumn of 1997, before the parliamentary election, in which he supported the Solidarity Electoral Action. In theory, it was to become the first Polish mass Christian Democrats, the lack of which – and in a country as Catholic as Poland – was pointed out by politicians. Lech Wałęsa's new party, built at the institute bearing his name, did not gain any significance on the political scene.

The ChDRP was registered by the court on 2 December 1997, and its first congress, at which the party's national leadership was elected, took place in September 1998. Initially, a group of about 10 AWS parliamentarians joined the party, including Stanisław Iwanicki (the party's deputy chairman), Jerzy Gwiżdż, Marek Kolasiński, Jan Oraniec, Konstanty Miodowicz, Władysław Skrzypek, Bernard Szweda and others (mainly associated with the Solidarity in the Elections movement). Gradually, most of them left the party for other groups (RS AWS, SKL, transformed into the SwW party). The Christian Democrats' authorities also included Marek Gumowski (board chairman), Marek Karpiński (spokesperson) and Elżbieta Hibner. The party ran in the local elections in 1998.

In October 2000, Lech Wałęsa ran in the presidential election, receiving 1.01% of the votes (7th place out of 12 candidates), after which he resigned from the position of the party's chairman, receiving the title of honorary chairman.

In 2001, ChDRP signed an agreement with the Janusz Tomaszewski Civic Forum to run jointly in the parliamentary election of the same year under the name Civic Forum Christian Democracy. This committee did not register electoral lists for the Sejm, and only put forward a few candidates for the Senate, none of whom received a mandate. ChDRP returned to activity under its own banner, ceasing any major activity. In the elections, several party members ran for the Sejm on the Civic Platform lists, and a few were also on the AWSP and ARS lists. None of them received a mandate.

Christian Democracy of the Third Polish Republic was removed from the register of political parties (where it was entered under number 3) in the spring of 2003 due to the lack of financial reports for previous years. On 12 May 2004 it was re-registered (under number 176; at the request of Lech Wałęsa, Gniewomir Rokosz-Kuczyński and Piotr Dwornicki). In the elections to the European Parliament the following month, ChDRP activists Gniewomir Rokosz-Kuczyński, Wojciech Żebrowski and Piotr Dwornicki ran from the lists of the National Electoral Committee of Voters (led by Maciej Płażyński), which did not receive any seats. The party's activity then ceased.

In later years, some of the ChDRP circles became closer to the Right of the Republic. Gniewomir Rokosz-Kuczyński, who remained one of the group's leaders, was also the district representative of Marek Jurek's party in Kraków. In the 2011 parliamentary elections, Bogumiła Zwolińska from ChDRP ran for the Sejm from the Right's list near Kraków.

The party became active in 2015. It registered a committee for the 2015 Polish parliamentary election, but ultimately did not run. However, it supported three candidates for the Senate (Jarosław Lasecki from PO and Anna Maria Anders and Konstanty Radziwiłł, who ran for PiS). On 10 November 2015, Lech Wałęsa announced the reactivation of ChDRP at a conference in the office of the European Solidarity Centre. He appointed Piotr Dwornicki and Adam Zalewski (who were also appointed vice-chairmen) and Adam Domiński (who was also appointed spokesman) as plenipotentiaries for the reactivation of the party. However, the party did not resume wider activity. In 2022, the party submitted a financial report to the National Electoral Commission after the required deadline set out in the Act on Political Parties. In 2023, ChDRP was deregistered from the register of political parties again.

== See also ==
- Bezpartyjny Blok Wspierania Reform (BBWR)
