= Andrzej Olechowski =

Polish politician (1947–2026)

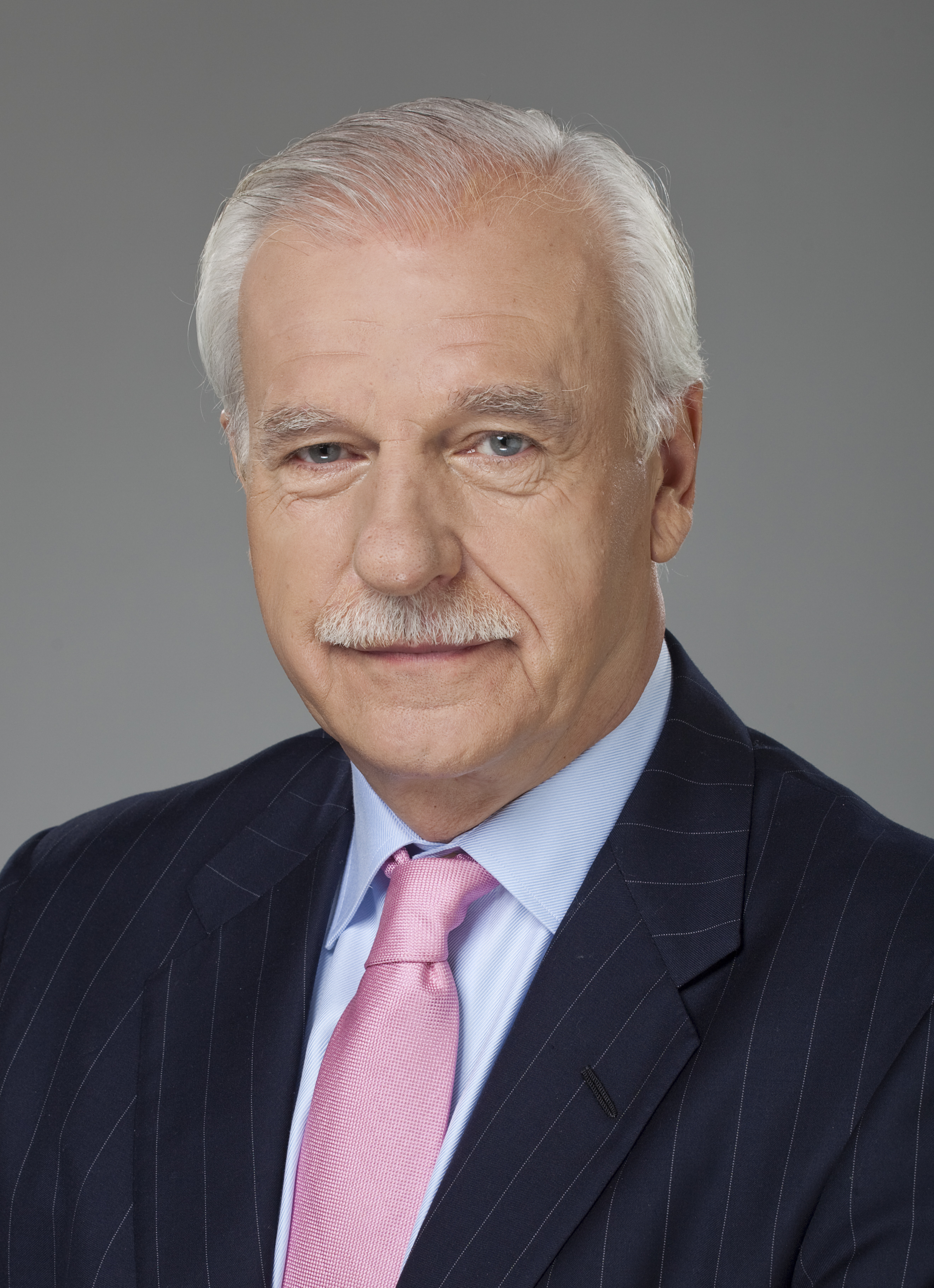
- Official portrait, 2010

Minister of Finance
- In office 26 February 1992 – 5 June 1992
- Prime Minister: Jan Olszewski
- Preceded by: Karol Lutowski
- Succeeded by: Jerzy Osiatyński

Minister of Foreign Affairs
- In office 26 October 1993 – 6 March 1995
- Prime Minister: Waldemar Pawlak
- Preceded by: Krzysztof Skubiszewski
- Succeeded by: Władysław Bartoszewski

Personal details
- Born: 9 September 1947 Kraków, Poland
- Died: 25 April 2026 (aged 78)
- Party: Civic Platform (2001–2009)
- Other party: BBWR (1993–1997)
- Spouse: Irena Olechowska
- Children: 2
- Profession: Economist

Andrzej Marian Olechowski (Polish: [ˈandʐɛj ɔlɛˈxɔfskʲi]; 9 September 1947 – 25 April 2026) was a Polish politician. He was one of the co-founders of liberal conservative party Civic Platform in 2001 with Maciej Płażyński and Donald Tusk. Olechowski served as Minister of Finance (1992) in the Jan Olszewski's Government and Minister of Foreign Affairs (1993–1995) in the Waldemar Pawlak's Government.

Olechowski was an independent candidate in 2000 presidential election, coming second after incumbent Aleksander Kwaśniewski. In 2002, he was Civic Platform's candidate for president of Warsaw but failed to get to the second round. Afterwards he began moving away from politics.

He left the Civic Platform in July 2009 and started co-operating with the Democratic Party. He was one of the candidates in the 2010 Polish presidential election, but received 1.44% of votes and did not advance to the second round.

== Early life and education ==
Olechowski was born in Kraków on 9 September 1947. In 1979, he received a PhD from the Central School of Planning and Statistics in Warsaw, and also attended the Graduate Institute of International and Development Studies in Geneva.

== Career ==
Before becoming Minister of Finance, he worked for UNCTAD, The World Bank, and the National Bank of Poland.

In 1992, he was the Minister of Finance. From 1993 to 1995, he was Minister of Foreign Affairs.

- Director of Euronet, USA.
- 2005 functions
  - Supervisory Boards of Citibank Handlowy and Europejski Fundusz Hipoteczny;
  - Senior Advisor, Central Europe Trust Polska;
  - Director, Studiam Generale Europa;
  - Chairman, Citizens for the Republic.
  - President of The Central European Forum

== Death ==
Olechowski's death was reported on 25 April 2026, at the age of 78.

== Awards and honours ==
- Fellow of Collegium Invisibile.
