= Jan Krzysztof Bielecki =

41st Prime Minister of Poland in 1991

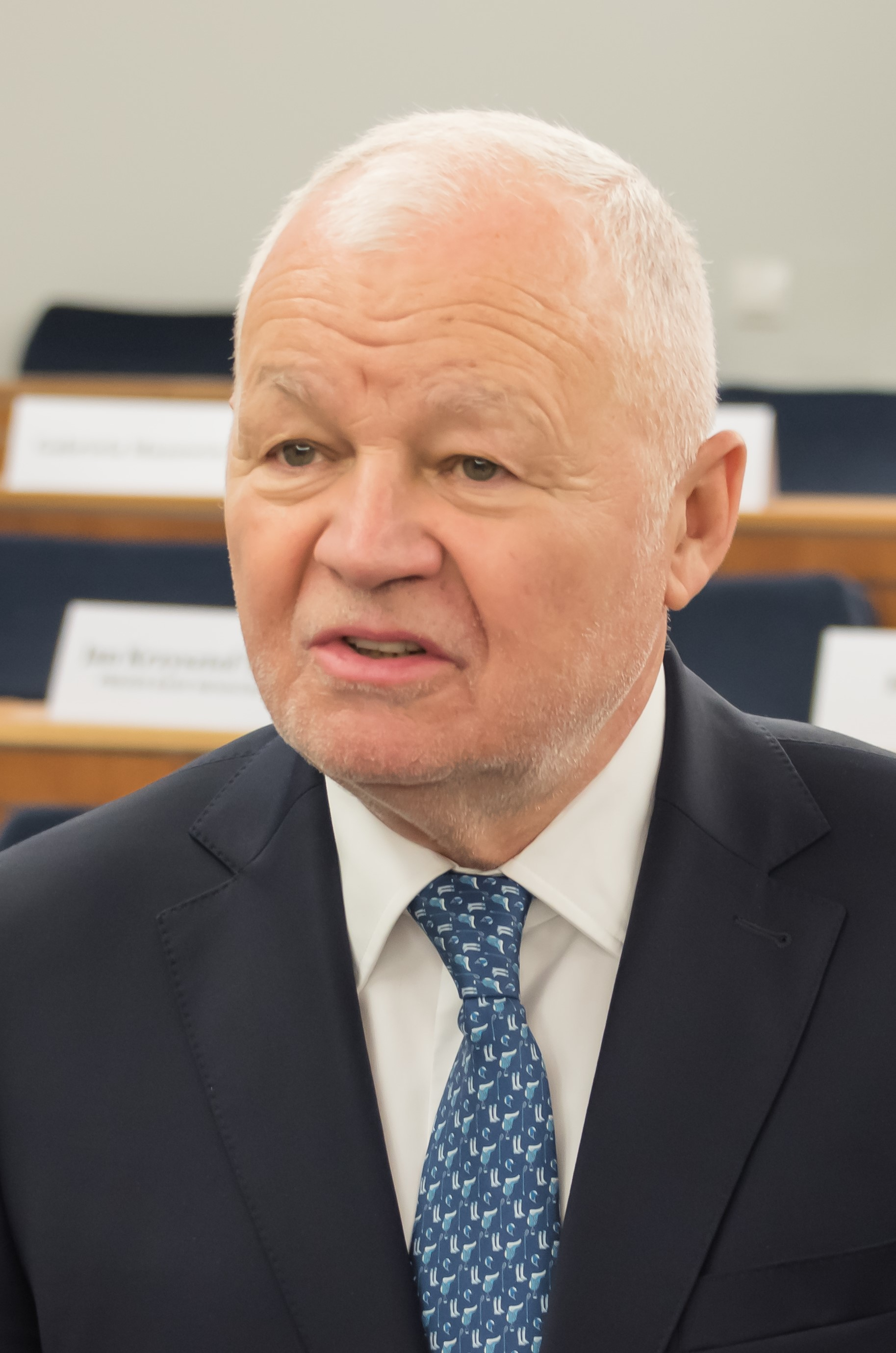
- Bielecki in 2024

Prime Minister of Poland
- In office 4 January 1991 – 6 December 1991
- President: Lech Wałęsa
- Deputy: Leszek Balcerowicz
- Preceded by: Tadeusz Mazowiecki
- Succeeded by: Jan Olszewski

Personal details
- Born: 3 May 1951 (age 75) Bydgoszcz, Poland
- Party: Solidarity Citizens' Committee (1988–1991); Liberal Democratic Congress (1991–1994); Freedom Union (1994–2001); Civic Platform (2001–present)
- Education: University of Gdańsk
- Awards: Order of the White Eagle (Poland) Legion of Honour Bene Merito (Poland)

Jan Krzysztof Bielecki (Note: ['jan ˈkʂɨʂtɔf bʲɛˈlɛt͡skʲi]) (born 3 May 1951) is a Polish liberal politician and economist. A leading figure of the Gdańsk-based Liberal Democratic Congress in the early 1990s, Bielecki served as Prime Minister of Poland for most of 1991. In his post-political career, Bielecki served as president of Bank Pekao between 2003 and 2010, and served as the president of the Polish Institute of International Affairs between 2009 and 2015. Since the early 2000s, Bielecki has been a member of the Civic Platform party. In 2010, the Warsaw Business Journal described Bielecki as one of the most respected economists in Poland.

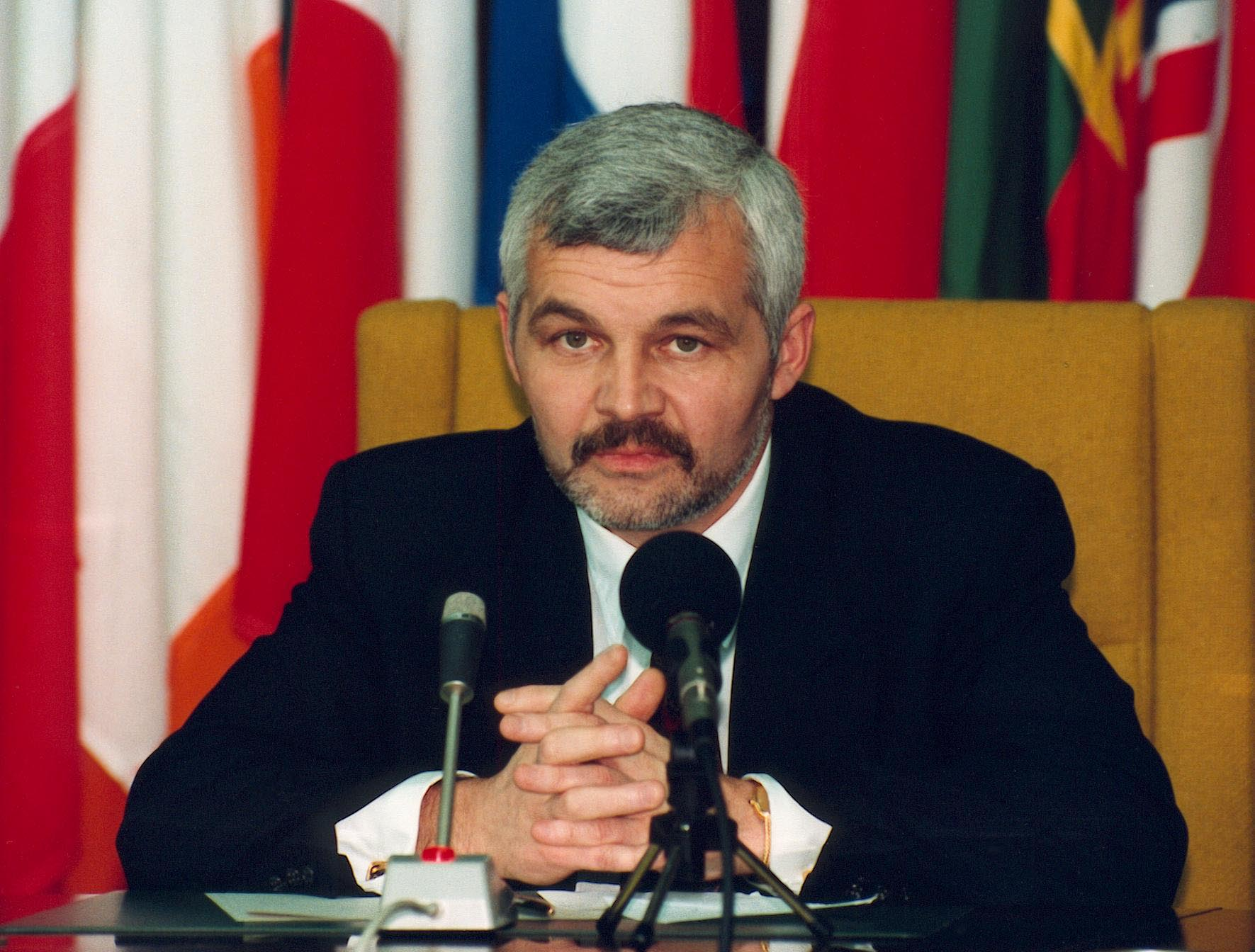
Bielecki in 1991

== Early life ==
Born in Bydgoszcz on 3 May 1951, Bielecki studied sea transport economics at the University of Gdańsk, graduating in 1973. For much of the latter half of the 1970s, Bielecki was employed as an economist at the Center of Heavy Industry, an applied economic research institute in Gdańsk. In 1980, Bielecki joined the Solidarity movement, taking an active role in the movement by providing it with logistical support. As martial law was declared in December 1981 to crush dissidents, Bielecki was arrested and briefly detained by authorities. Recognized for his role in Solidarity, Bielecki was fired from the Center of Heavy Industry and blacklisted from state employment. After eight months of unemployment, Bielecki found a job as a truck driver for an agricultural cooperative, while also secretly remained active in Solidarity by publishing pamphlets and monitoring clandestine police activities for the movement. During a forum held at the London School of Economics in 2009, Bielecki described the difficulty many fellow Solidarity activists faced during the early 1980s. "After martial law, a lot of people—colleagues of mine—were [on] their knees or in a regular prison. Unfortunately, 70 percent of them decided to leave the country because they thought, 'The fight is over. It's the end. There is no chance for the future.' And we tried in a hopeless way to stay in the country, in my personal view, mostly not to give up and to fight for pride."

=== In business and politics ===
Remaining outside of the state sector while also continuing underground support for Solidarity, Bielecki, along with other like-minded colleagues from the University of Gdańsk (Polish: Uniwersytet Gdański), sought to take advantage of new economic reforms instituted by the communist government in the mid-1980s. These reforms replaced the direct administration of state enterprises with written regulations for managers. Realizing that the reform laws had large loopholes in financial and tax oversight, the situation could be taken advantage of by private consulting firms, which could advise state enterprises to avoid various regulations. Bielecki created the Doradca cooperative (Polish: doradca, meaning 'advisor') with virtually no capital or financial sources, with himself as "chief of operations" and one secretary as a coworker. Using academic and personal connections from the University of Gdańsk, Bielecki established working relationships with Polish Ocean Lines and other state enterprises. As few consultancy bodies existed in the communist People's Republic of Poland (PRL), Bielecki's academic and personal connections with sympathetic university professors and alumni were crucial in obtaining work at the time.

Bielecki's cooperative quickly received work in tax consultancy. The opaque and often vague tax codes issued by the communist government confused state enterprise managers, who relied on Doradca to assist them in limiting their tax returns. The cooperative, using the many loopholes that existed in the tax code, gained expertise in raising individual salaries at state firms without raising tax liabilities. In 1987, Bielecki organized his employees to create software simulating various strategies on wage tax liabilities. The software became immensely popular with Poland's largest enterprises, who quickly purchased copies. By 1988, the government eased prohibitions on Western firms making joint ventures with Polish enterprises. With few consultancy firms in place, and fewer English-speaking Poles conversant in Western financial analysis, Doradca was well-placed to assist these new firms with Poland's tax and banking regulations. At the same time, Doradca, through the efforts of Bielecki, continued to assist in recruiting and employing underground Solidarity members. During that time, Bielecki was given the nickname "Little Black" (Polish: małe czarne) among Solidarity activists, supporters and trade unionists.

In the waning days of the communist state, Bielecki, along with fellow Gdańsk liberals Janusz Lewandowski, Donald Tusk and Jacek Merkel, founded the Gdańsk Society for Socio-Economic Development, an informal organization of intellectual liberal dissidents, who became known as the "Congress Liberals." In the partially free 1989 parliamentary elections, Bielecki was elected to the Sejm as a member of the Solidarity Citizens' Committee. During the splintering of the Solidarity Citizens' Movement throughout 1990, Bielecki and other Gdańsk intellectuals increasingly favoured a liberal approach to reform the Polish economy. Congress Liberal members, including Bielecki, voted to create the Liberal Democratic Congress (KLD) in June 1990 in order to contest parliamentary elections. The new party advocated pragmatic liberalism, privatization, the expansion of Poland's newly free market, and European integration. The party, along with Bielecki, also supported Lech Wałęsa in the 1990 presidential election.

== Prime Minister: 1991 ==
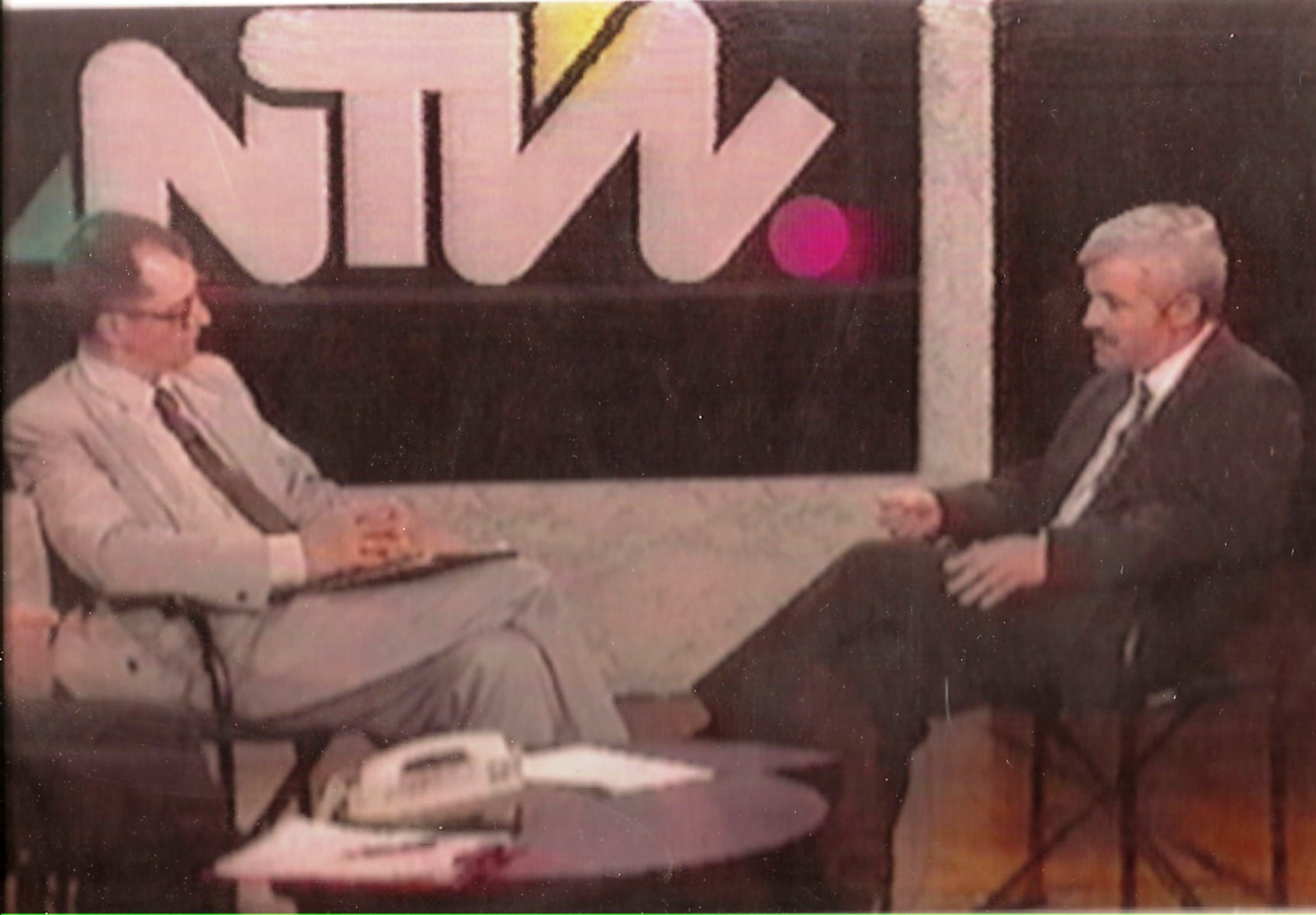
Bielecki (right) on Andrzej Tadeusz Kijowski's talk show in July 1993

Following the resignation of Prime Minister Tadeusz Mazowiecki in November 1990 after his resounding defeat in the first round of the presidential election, newly elected President Lech Wałęsa sought a new prime minister. Originally, the president appointed lawyer and former activist Jan Olszewski to the office of Prime Minister, though Olszewski quickly refused the position after numerous disagreements with Wałęsa over conditions the president placed on the prime minister's cabinet. Wałęsa turned instead to Bielecki to form a new government. Bielecki was little-known at the time within political circles. Bielecki accepted Wałęsa's proposals to the cabinet, keeping five ministers from the previous Mazowiecki government, including Finance Minister and Deputy Prime Minister Leszek Balcerowicz, who would continue to institute the shock therapy Balcerowicz Plan to the Polish economy. Bielecki then crafted a coalition government between his Liberal Democratic Congress and other parties who supported Lech Wałęsa, including the Centre Agreement, the Democratic Party and the Christian National Union. Bielecki took the oath of office on 4 January 1991, heading the first government in 47 years in which none of its members had previously served under Communism.

Bielecki's government quickly focused on the international economic situation in Poland. Appearing at the World Economic Forum (WEF) in Davos, Switzerland in February 1991, Bielecki asked Western creditor nations to forgive 80 percent of Poland's $46.6 billion foreign debt. Through these negotiations, Western Europe governments agreed to forgive 50 percent of the debt in the following month, followed by the United States forgiving 70 percent of its share, and Brazil with 50 percent. The International Monetary Fund and the World Bank similarly agreed to provide Poland with modernization loans. Domestically, Bielecki's government pursued efforts to deconstruct the former command economy. In June, the Bielecki government proposed a massive privatization program to sell 400 state enterprises, nearly 25 percent of Poland's industrial sales output. According to the plan, the Polish state would retain control of 30 percent of enterprises through the use of a national wealth management fund, with every adult citizen given shares from the fund, while employees of each selected firm would receive ten percent of their company's shares. During the same period, the Warsaw Stock Exchange (WSE) opened for business in April 1991.

Bielecki's economic program proved to be tremendously controversial, particularly among Solidarity activists and politicians. In May 1991, nearly 10,000 protesters converged in Warsaw to voice dissent against the government's radical economic reforms. Simultaneously, Solidarity organized strikes in various parts of the country. Diplomatically, Bielecki's government continued the push away from the Eastern Bloc and towards a stronger alliance with the West. In February 1991, negotiations with the Soviet Union began the withdrawal of over 50,000 troops from Poland and a military dismantling of the Warsaw Pact. Under Bielecki, Poland voted to dissolve Comecon (Council for Mutual Economic Assistance) and the Warsaw Pact, whose organizations officially disbanded between June and July 1991. Negotiations with Belgium, France, Germany, Luxembourg and the Netherlands successfully lifted visa restrictions against Polish citizens. In June, Bielecki, along with his German counterpart, the German Chancellor Helmut Kohl, signed the Treaty of Good Neighbourship between Poland and Germany, reaffirming the German-Polish Border Treaty and the Oder–Neisse line as the border between both nations. In November, following the conclusion of negotiations, Poland was invited to join the Council of Europe (CoE). Bielecki's government additionally led negotiations to sign an interim agreement with the European Coal and Steel Community (ECSC) and the European Economic Community (EEC) on trade, though its completion would occur until after the Bielecki government had collapsed.

In regards to the regional administration, the Bielecki government proposed an overhaul of local government, arguing to replace the newly created rejony with county-level powiats (counties), as well as proposing Poland to be decentralized into regions. The proposal called for the regions to be endowed with elected parliaments, answerable regional governments, and retain a regional central government presence. The idea was deeply influenced by the Länder (States) of Germany, envisioning a federalist model for Poland. Opponents of Bielecki's local government proposals charged the idea as a step towards German subordination, advocating instead for the republic to remain a unitary state (a state governed as a single entity). The proposal was later changed, envisioning Poland divided into ten or twelve voivodeships (Polish states) with the central government administering policy within each region. The reform proposals, however, did not enter into legislation. The decentralization plans have since been interpreted as Bielecki's attempt to create strong provincial governments in order to carry out the government's economic reforms.

Within parliament, Bielecki's hold on the premiership was continually marred with difficulties. With a minority government, Bielecki faced a hostile parliament that time and again defeated the government's economic and political reforms. Without parliamentary support, President Wałęsa advocated the Council of Ministers to grant itself special powers to rule by decree. However, Bielecki hesitated to grant such powers, instead proposing to parliament a "fast lane" for economic legislation. Yet by June 1991, none of the government's 27 bills had passed the Sejm. Bielecki offered his resignation to the Sejm, yet his motion was defeated 211–144. Following his defeat, Bielecki pushed for decree powers, though for only the two months prior to the scheduled parliamentary elections on 27 October, with certain legislation being excluded from decrees. While defending his decree proposal as only a temporary solution, Bielecki congruently proposed to grant the presidency special powers, including the right to nominate and dismiss the prime minister and members of the cabinet, as a measure of "preventing democracy from slipping into chaos and anarchy."

Despite gaining half of the Sejm to favour both proposals, Bielecki lacked the two-thirds majority needed to pass the act of either special power. With allegations of corruption from members of his government, along with a worsening economy, Bielecki and the Liberal Democratic Congress emerged from the 1991 parliamentary elections with mixed results. The Liberal Democratic Congress emerged with 37 seats in the Sejm, with Bielecki elected to Warsaw I. However, neither the party, nor Bielecki, nor any other party, commanded a clear majority after the deeply inconclusive election, as Bielecki lacked support to continue the government. In the coalition negotiations that followed, the Liberal Democratic Congress pulled out of government formation talks with the Center Civic Alliance group dominated by the Centre Agreement, due to economic and cabinet differences between both camps. Bielecki remained as prime minister until being replaced by Jan Olszewski of the Centre Agreement on 6 December 1991.

== Post Premiership ==
=== Parliamentary career ===
As a member of the Sejm and one of the leaders of the Liberal Democratic Congress, Bielecki continued his support for stronger political and economic integration into Europe. During his post-premier period in the Sejm, Bielecki served in the Committee on Foreign Affairs. Speaking from the Sejm floor in May 1992, Bielecki expressed strong support for Poland entering an association agreement into the European Economic Community, saying "Here is the strategy, here is a Polish place in uniting Europe, with Poles benefiting from collective security, Poles enjoying the freedom of movement of people, goods and capital. This is an opportunity to participate in the political structures and the global economy." During the early 1990s, Bielecki also strongly supported the Visegrád initiative with Czechoslovakia and Hungary, greater integration with NATO, and encouraged Polish political and economic policy to take inspiration from successful Asian Tiger and Latin American nations as positive examples. In July 1992, Bielecki supported the appointment of Hanna Suchocka as prime minister. Suchocka later appointed Bielecki as a minister without portfolio, tasked for relations with the European Community between 1992 and 1993 under a coalition agreement between Suchocka's Democratic Union and the Liberal Democratic Congress.

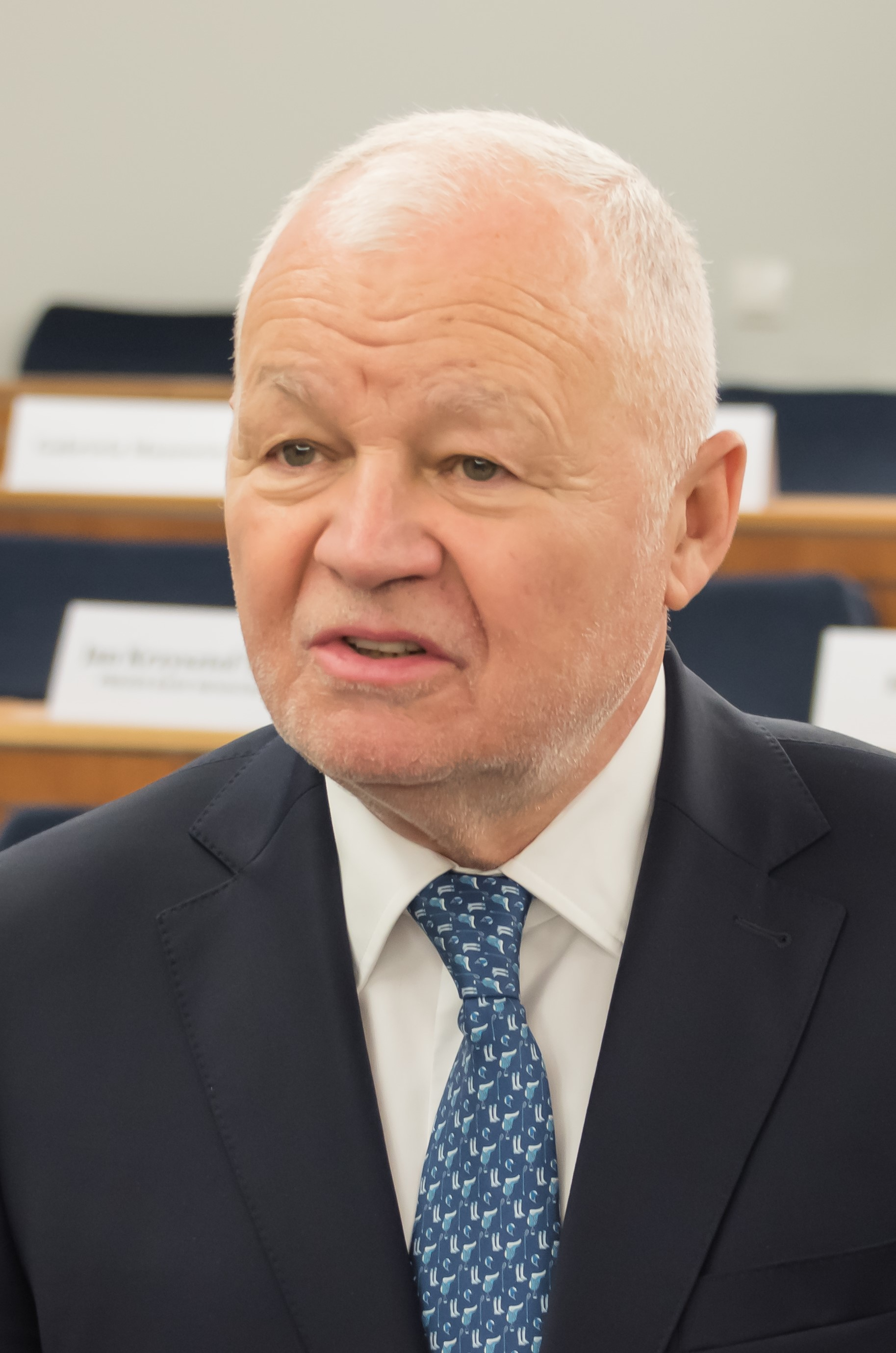
Bielecki in 2024

=== Banking and Post-Political career ===
Deeply frustrated by economic hardships brought on by privatization, voters punished the Suchocka government in the September 1993 parliamentary election, with Bielecki's Liberal Democratic Congress losing the entirety of its seats in the Sejm. After the severe defeat, Bielecki was appointed to the board of directors of the European Bank for Reconstruction and Development (EBRD) in December, where he remained until September 2003. In 1994, Bielecki co-founded the Freedom Union, a centrist pro-European Union party through the unification of the Democratic Union and the Liberal Democratic Congress. In 2001, Bielecki joined Civic Platform. From 2003 to 2010, Bielecki served as president of Bank Pekao. Bielecki's resignation announcement in 2009 from the bank sparked rumors of a possible bid to become premier again or serve as finance minister in the event of Prime Minister Donald Tusk running for the presidency in 2010. However, conservative members of the Polish political establishment, including the Law and Justice party and Radio Maryja, alleged in 2012 of financial wrongdoings by Bielecki while as president of Bank Pekao, particularly with the bank's relationship with Italian developer Pirelli & C. Real Estate.

Rumors circulated within Polish media and football circles throughout the end of 2011 to the middle of 2012 that Bielecki was under consideration to head the Polish Football Association (PZPN). The speculation began following comments made by former referee and PZPN president Michał Listkiewicz that Bielecki would be an ideal choice to head the association due to his international experience and passion for the sport. However, Bielecki dismissed the idea of heading the body. In May 2013, members of the opposition Law and Justice party alleged that a report from outgoing ABW head Krzysztof Bondaryk accused Bielecki of illegally lobbying for Russian companies in order to acquire shares of ZA Tarnów, a chemical production facility. Bielecki denied the reports, with the ABW similarly responding that the report claimed by Law and Justice did not exist.

== Current activities ==
From 2010 to 2014, Bielecki served as president of the Chancellery's Economic Council after his appointment by Prime Minister Donald Tusk. Bielecki served as the president of the Polish Institute of International Affairs from 2009 to 2015. Bielecki has also published articles within a number of newspapers and magazines, including The Wall Street Journal, Die Welt, Rzeczpospolita and Gazeta Wyborcza.

== Personal life ==
Bielecki is married and with two children. The former prime minister is well known for his adoration of motorcycles. In September 2012, tabloid newspaper Fakt photographed Bielecki arriving and leaving work at the Chancellery on a BMW F800R, dressed in jeans, a black jacket, sneakers and wearing a backpack. The tabloid noted that while Bielecki's position in the Chancellery was entitled to a free limousine for commuting to and from work, the former prime minister preferred instead to use his personal motorcycle.

Bielecki is also well known for his fondness of football, and has occasionally given commentary on the game to the media. Bielecki is also known to play football during his free time against his fellow former premier and current President of the European Council Donald Tusk. Both Tusk and Bielecki have remained close friends and political allies since their days together in Solidarity in the 1980s. In regards to the state of Polish football, the former prime minister jokingly quipped in 2010 that, "I don't believe that Poles are weaker [as a people]. The only area where we are absolute idiots is football!"

Aside from his native Polish, Bielecki is fluent in English, as well as conversant in French and Russian.

== Honours and awards ==
- South Korea : Grand Gwanghwa Medal of the Order of Diplomatic Service Merit
- Czech Republic Slovakia : Czech and Slovak Transatlantic Award
- France : Legion of Honour, Grand Officier
- Poland : Order of the White Eagle, Knight
- Poland : Bene Merito honorary distinction
- Poland : Kisiel Prize

== Works cited ==
- Dudek, Antoni (2007). Historia Polityczna Polski, 1989–2005. Kraków: Arcana. ISBN 978-8389243294.
- Hunter, Jr., Richard J.; Ryan, Leo V. (1998). From Autarchy to Market: Polish Economics and Politics, 1945-1995. Cambridge, MA: Harvard Business Review Press. ISBN 978-0275962197.
- Johnson, Simon; Loveman, Gary W. (1995). Starting Over in Eastern Europe: Entrepreneurship and Economic Renewal. Westport, CT: Praeger Publishers. ISBN 978-0875845692.
- Kerlin, Janelle A. (1994). Social Service Reform in the Postcommunist State: Decentralization in Poland. College Station, TX: Texas A&M University Press. ISBN 978-1585444175.
- Millard, Frances (1996). "Poland's 'return to Europe,' 1989-94.". In Robert Bideleux; Richard Taylor (eds.). European Integration and Disintegration: East and West. New York: Routledge. ISBN 978-0415137416.
- Nagle, John D.; Mahr, Alison (1999). Democracy and Democratization. New York: SAGE Publications. ISBN 978-0761956792.
- Orenstein, Mitchell Alexander (2001). Out of the Red : Building Capitalism and Democracy in Postcommunist Europe. Ann Arbor, MI: University of Michigan Press. ISBN 978-0472067466.
- Weiner, Robert (1994). Change in Eastern Europe. Westport, CT: Praeger Publishers. ISBN 978-0275945398.
- Wróbel, Piotr J. (2010). "Rebuilding Democracy in Poland, 1989-2004.". In M. B. B. Biskupski; James S. Pula; Piotr J. Wróbel (eds.). The Origins of Modern Polish Democracy. Athens, OH: Ohio University Press. ISBN 978-0821418925.

Political offices
Preceded by Tadeusz Mazowiecki	Prime Minister of Poland; 1991	Succeeded by Jan Olszewski
