= 2000 Polish presidential election =

- 8 October 2000
- Turnout: 61.08% (▼3.62pp)
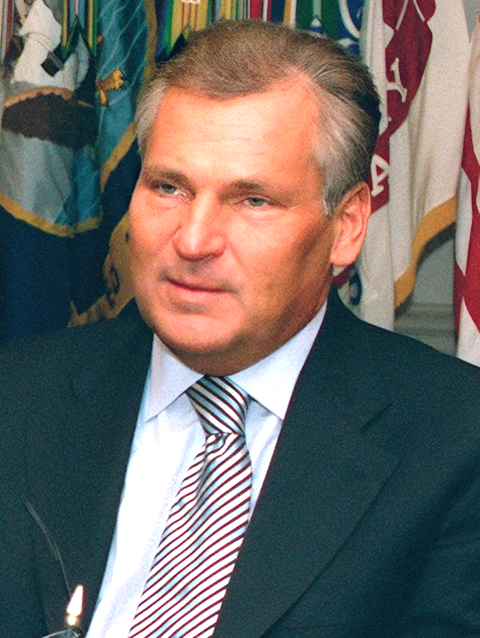

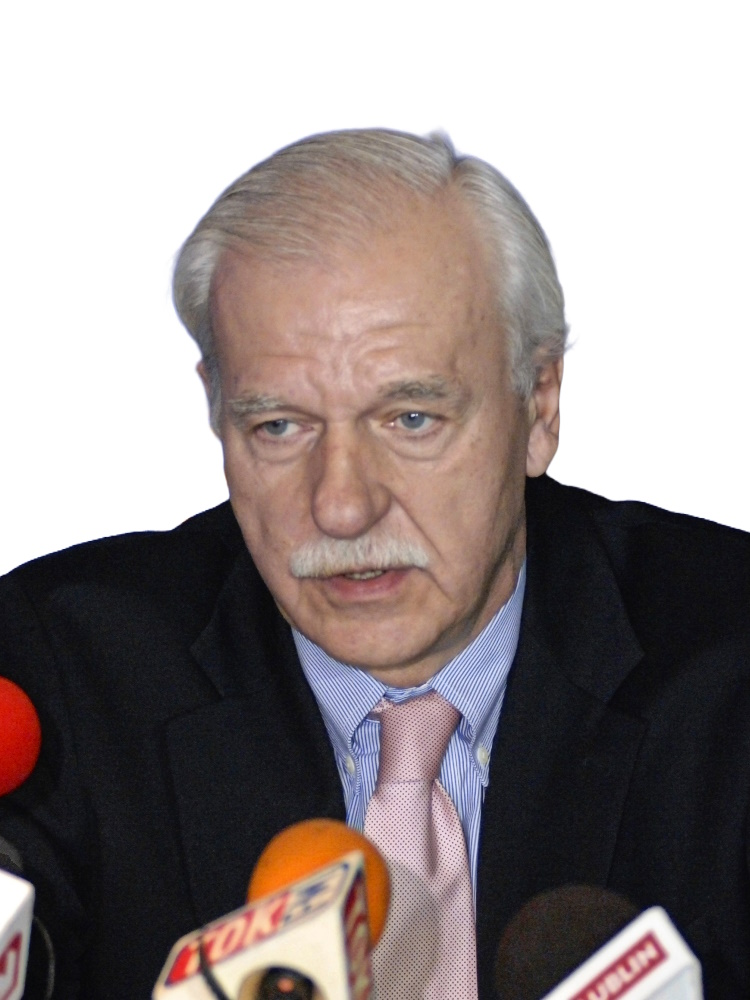

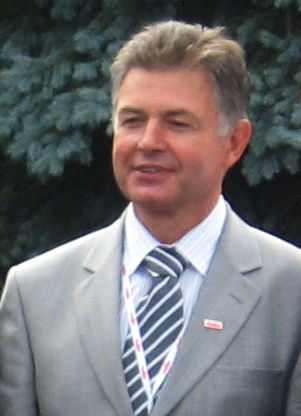

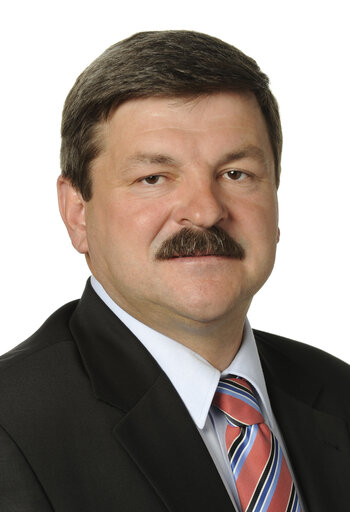
Nominee	Aleksander Kwaśniewski	Andrzej Olechowski
Party	Independent (Note: The President of Poland traditionally resigns from party membership after taking office. Although Kwaśniewski was officially an independent, his campaign was endorsed and funded by the Democratic Left Alliance.)	Independent (Note: Olechowski was registered as an independent but ran as the candidate of the Conservative People's Party.)
Popular vote	9,485,224	3,044,141
Percentage	53.90%	17.30%
Nominee	Marian Krzaklewski	Jarosław Kalinowski
Party	AWS	PSL
Popular vote	2,739,621	1,047,949
Percentage	15.57%	5.95%
- Results by powiat
President before election
Aleksander Kwaśniewski
Independent
Elected President
Aleksander Kwaśniewski
Independent

Presidential elections were held in Poland on 8 October 2000. Incumbent President Aleksander Kwaśniewski was easily re-elected in the first round with more than 50% of the vote, the only time a direct presidential election in Poland has not gone to a second round. Kwaśniewski would be the last president to be re-elected until Andrzej Duda in 2020.

== Electoral system ==
The President of Poland is elected for a five-year term using the two-round system; if no candidate receives a majority of the vote in the first round, a run-off is held between the top two candidates. Presidents serve a five-year term and can be re-elected once. The president-elect takes the oath of office on the day the previous President's term expires before the National Assembly (a joint session of the Sejm and the Senate).

In order to be registered to contest the election, a candidate must be a Polish citizen, be at least 35 years old on the day of the first round of the election, and have collected at least 100,000 voters' signatures. In 2000, 13 candidates registered, but one - former Prime Minister Jan Olszewski - withdrew before the first round, so 12 valid candidates appeared on the ballot.

== Background ==
Aleksander Kwaśniewski was elected in the 1995 presidential election and governed the country alongside the Democratic Left Alliance-Polish People's Party coalition until the 1997 parliamentary election, when the opposition, united under the Solidarity Electoral Action and led by the trade union's leader, Marian Krzaklewski, came to power, in a coalition with the Freedom Union. The coalition put up Jerzy Buzek as the next Prime Minister, as Krzaklewski had been seeking to challenge Kwaśniewski for the Presidency instead.

== Campaign ==
President Kwaśniewski was seen as very likely to win re-election in the run up to the presidential election with polls showing that his popularity was high as 70% support. His main challenger was expected to be Marian Krzaklewski from the Solidarity Electoral Action, which had formed the government since winning the last parliamentary elections in 1997. The other main candidate was a former Foreign Minister and more liberal conservative Andrzej Olechowski, who won support from voters who were discontented with both of the other main candidates and in particular younger voters, businessmen and intellectuals.

Candidates seen as having less of a chance included Andrzej Lepper, a populist farmers leader who opposed entry into the European Union and former president Lech Wałęsa. Wałęsa was rejected as the candidate for the Solidarity party he had won the presidency for, and thus ran separately in the election.

In order to be elected in the first round a candidate had to gain over 50% of the vote. If no candidate reached this level, then a second round would have been held between the top two candidates. As the campaign continued, the biggest question in the election was whether or not incumbent President Kwaśniewski would win the 50% required to avoid a second round.

In the August before the election Kwaśniewski and another former president and candidate Lech Wałęsa were investigated by a court on allegations that they had been informers for the Communist secret police. If they had been found guilty they could have been banned from seeking election to political office for 10 years. However they both claimed that the evidence had been manipulated by political opponents and were cleared by the court.

Solidarity candidate Krzaklewski attacked Kwaśniewski for his past as a Communist party activist. However opinion polls in August showed this had little effect with Kwaśniewski well ahead with over 60% support, while Krzaklewski was second and Olechowski third, but both a long way behind. President Kwaśniewski's campaign focused on reconciling all of Poland with slogans including "Poland, our common home". Most voters felt he had done well as President and he was seen as having done a good job in guiding Poland to membership of NATO. Krzaklewski's popularity was not high due to the infighting in the government led by his Solidarity party since they had won the 1997 parliamentary election. Meanwhile, Lech Wałęsa trailed badly in the polls with only about 2% support, which Wałęsa saw as being due to voters seeing him as being responsible for the pain involved in the transition from communism.

In the election 3 candidates ran on platforms against the European Union. During the campaign one of them, Andrzej Lepper, was arrested for illegally blocking a customs post, however he claimed that this was an attempt to sabotage his campaign.

As the election neared Kwaśniewski dropped in the polls and it became uncertain whether he would win the 50% required to avoid a second round. This followed a television advertisement from Solidarity candidate Krzaklewski in which Kwaśniewski was accused of having mocked Pope John Paul II. The video showed Kwaśniewski apparently urging his security advisor to kiss the ground is a parody of the Pope, although Kwaśniewski claimed this was inaccurate. At least one poll showed Kwaśniewski's support having dropped by 10% in one week following this, however it was the other main candidate, Andrzej Olechowski, who benefited as Krzaklewski was seen as being tarnished for having run a negative campaign.

=== Campaign spending ===
Candidate	2000 actual		2024 equivalent	
Candidate	Spent	Cost	Spent	Cost
Kwaśniewski	11,572,000	1,22	5,176,889	0,55
Olechowski	1,965,000	0,65	879,069	0,29
Krzaklewski	10,717,000	3,91	4,794,393	1,75
Kalinowski	2,113,000	2,02	945,278	0,90
Lepper	56,000	0,10	25,052	0,04
Korwin-Mikke	75,000	0,30	33,552	0,13
Wałęsa	299,000	1,67	133,761	0,75
Łopuszański	292,000	2,10	130,630	0,94
Grabowski	74,000	0,83	33,104	0,37
Ikonowicz	29,000	0,75	12,973	0,34
Wilecki	53,000	1,82	23,710	0,81
Pawłowski	15,000	0,87	6710	0,39
Source: Dudek

== Candidates ==
There was no second round since Aleksander Kwaśniewski got over 50% in the first round.

First Round

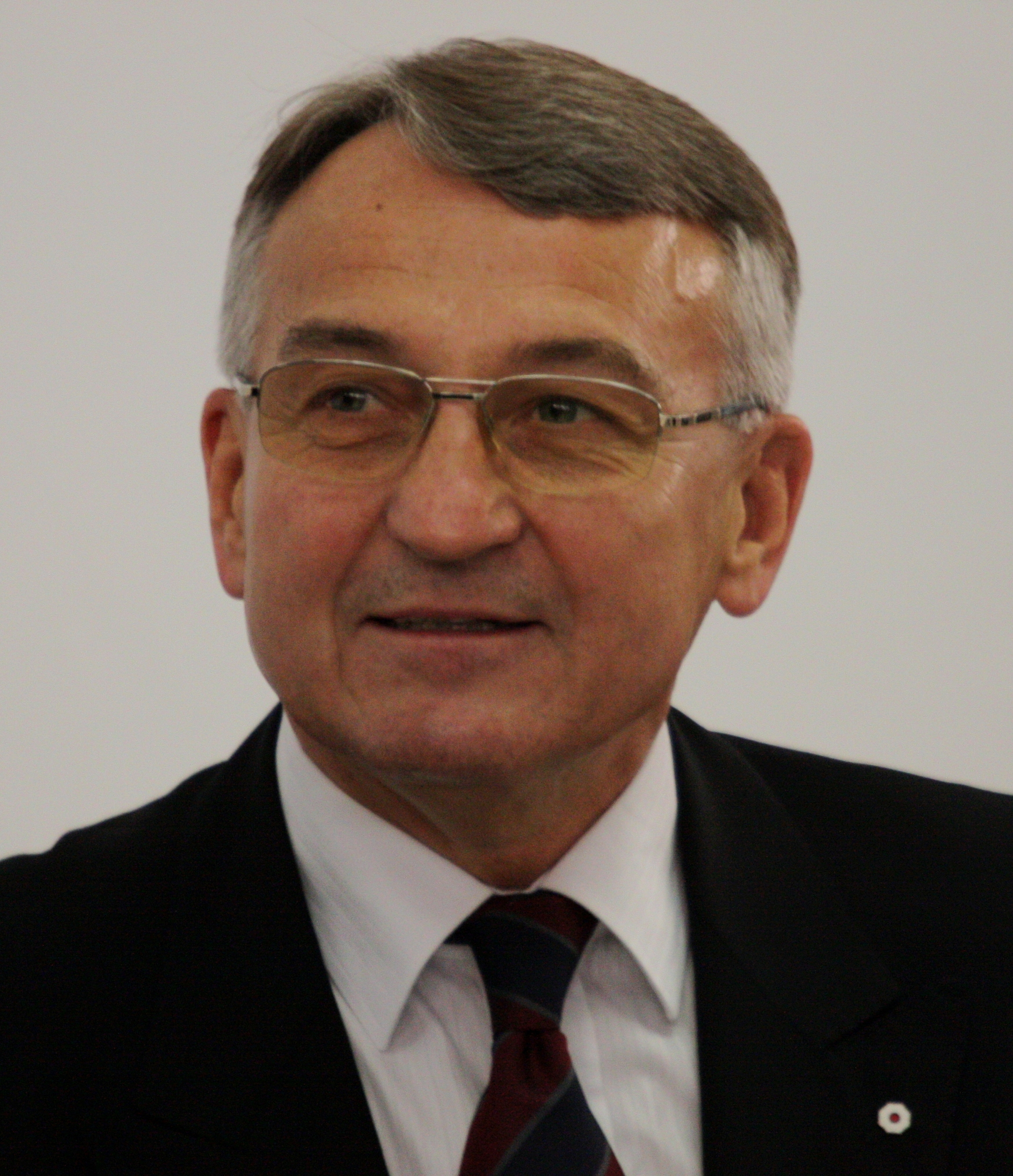
Member of the Sejm Dariusz Grabowski (Coalition for Poland), 50

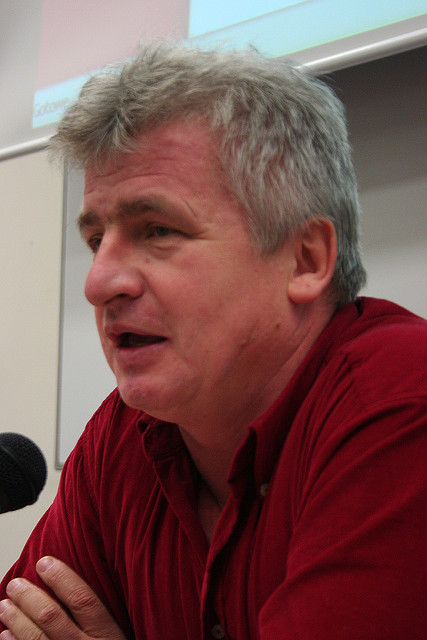
Member of the Sejm Piotr Ikonowicz (Polish Socialist Party), 44

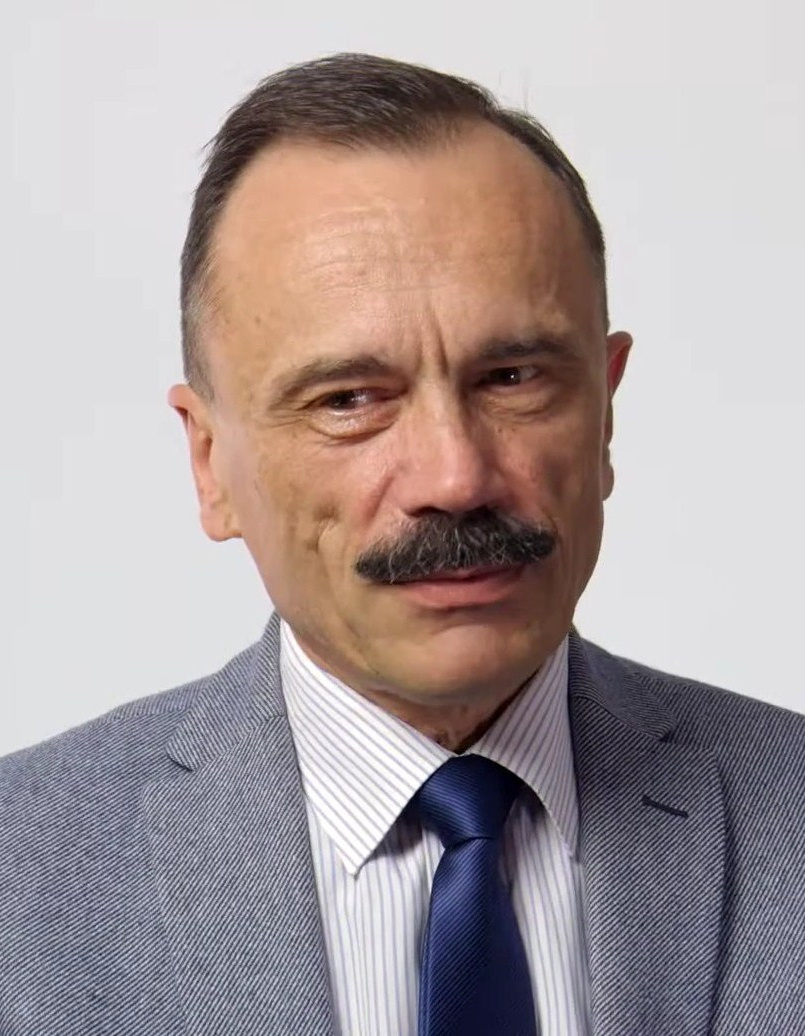
Member of the Sejm Jan Łopuszański (Polish Agreement), 45

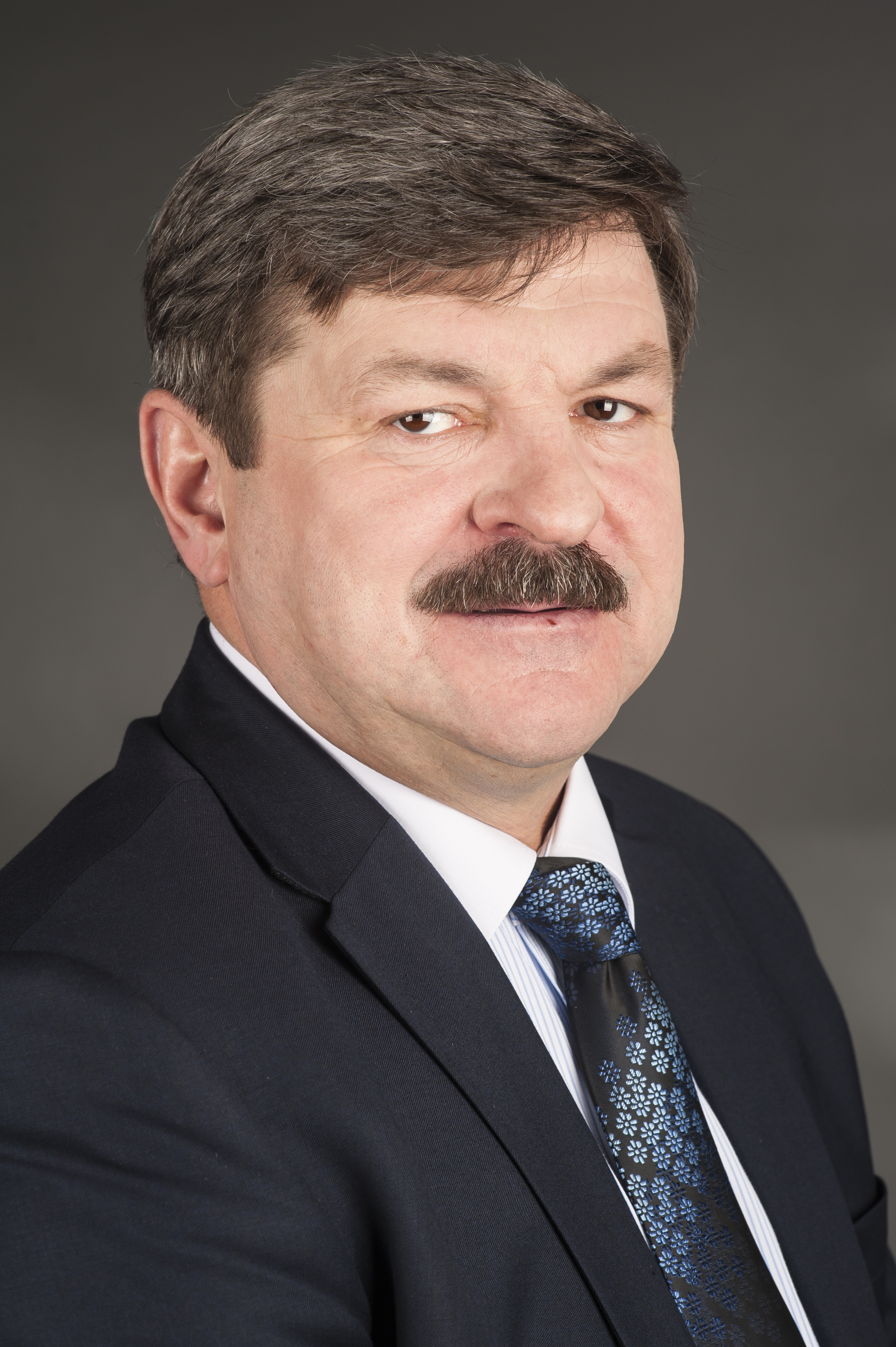
Former Deputy Prime Minister Jarosław Kalinowski (Polish People's Party), 38

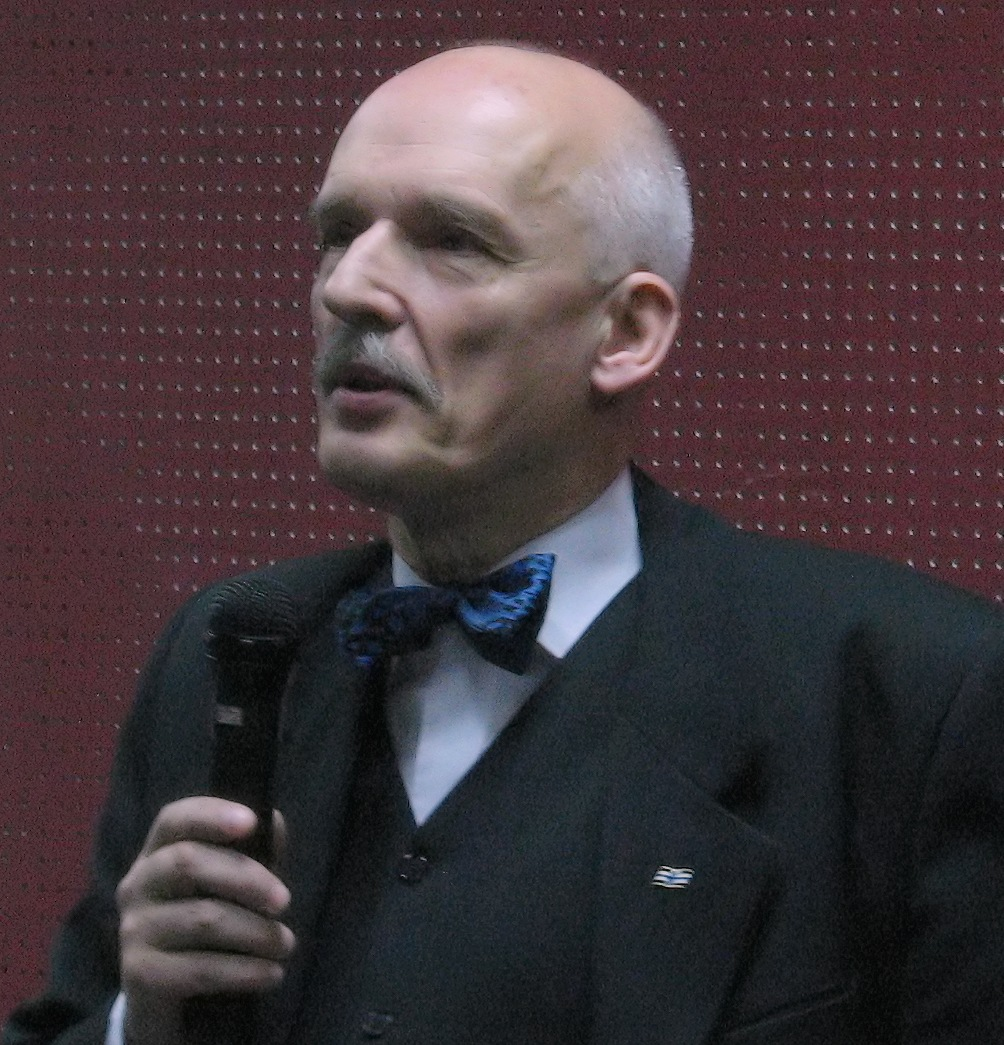
Former Member of the Sejm Janusz Korwin-Mikke (Real Politics Union), 57

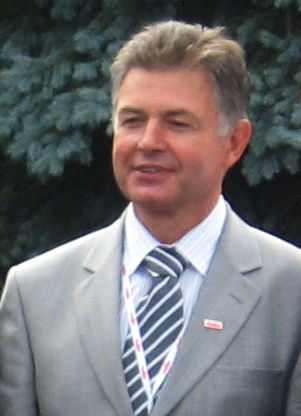
Chairman of NSZZ Solidarity Marian Krzaklewski (Solidarity Electoral Action), 50

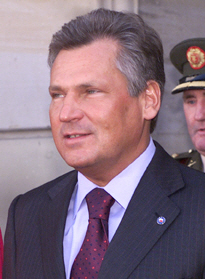
Incumbent President Aleksander Kwaśniewski (Independent), 45

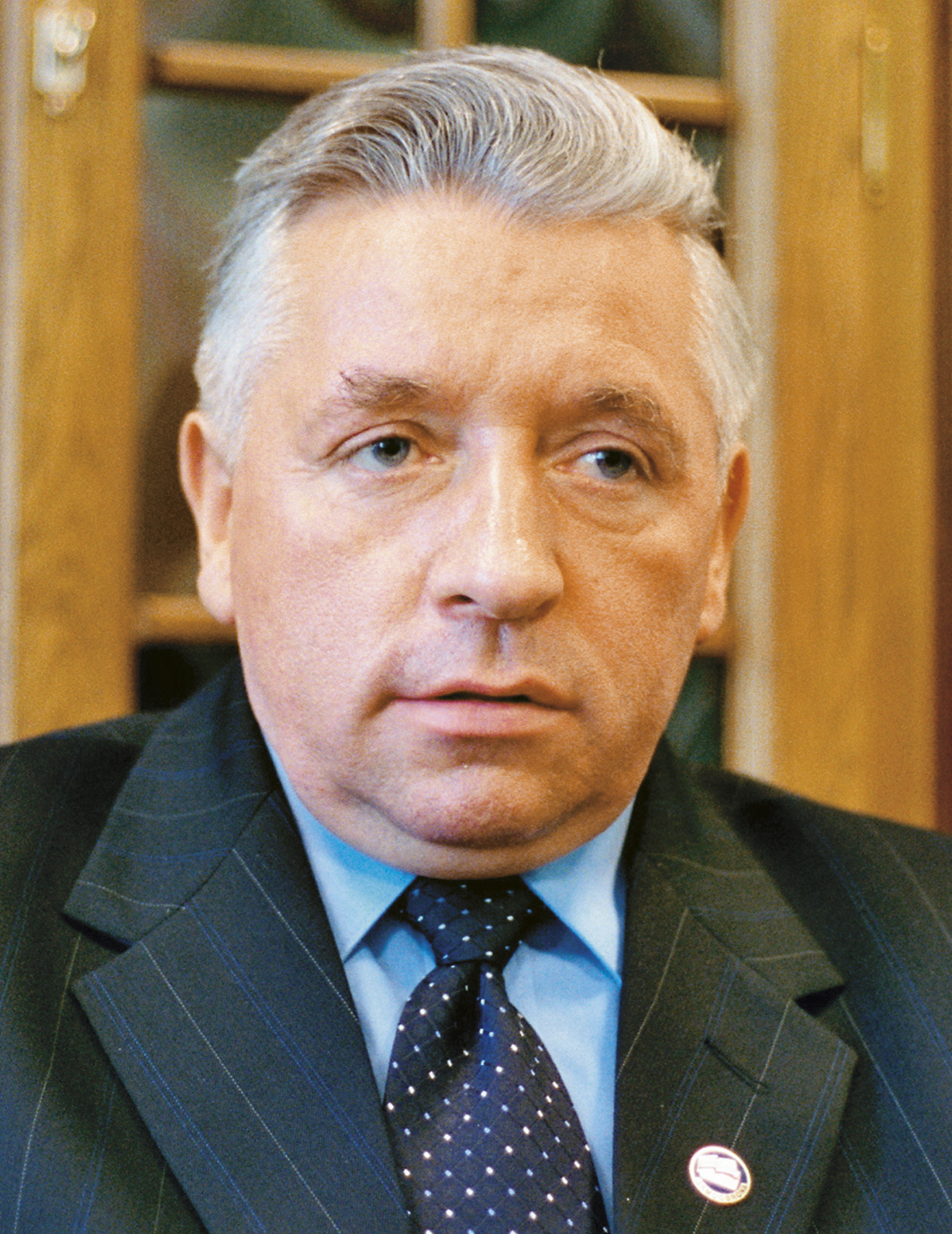
Agriculturer Andrzej Lepper (Self-Defense), 46

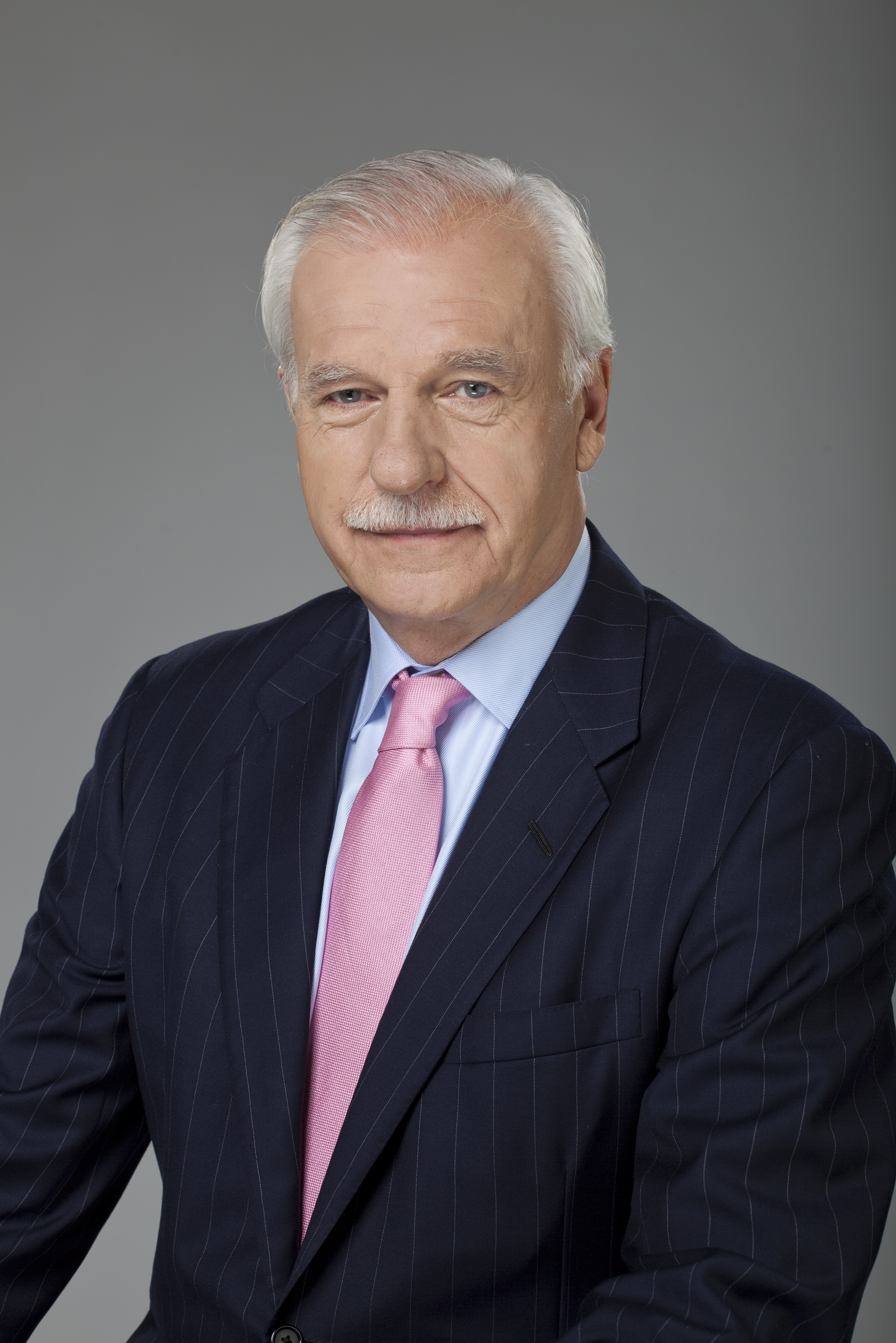
Former Minister of Foreign Affairs Andrzej Olechowski (Independent), 53

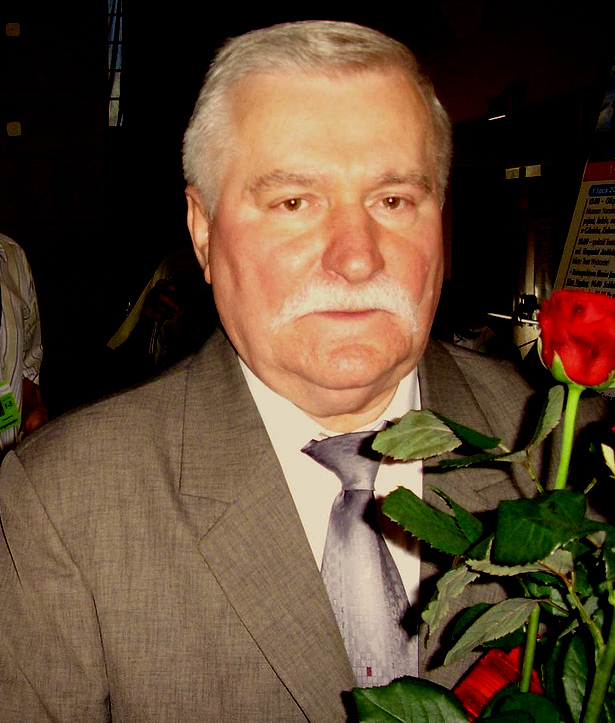
Former President Lech Wałęsa (Christian Democracy), 57
- Businessman Bogdan Pawłowski (Independent), 55
- Generał broni Tadeusz Wilecki (National Party), 55

=== Withdrawn ===
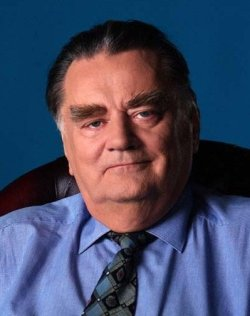
Former Prime Minister Jan Olszewski (ROP), 70

== Opinion polls ==
Pollster	Date of polling	Kwaśniewski IN	Olechowski IN	Krzaklewski AWS	Kalinowski PSL	Lepper SRP	Korwin UPR	Wałęsa ChDRP	Łopuszański PP	Grabowski KdP	Ikonowicz PPS	Wilecki SN	Pawłowski IN	Olszewski ROP	Others and Undecideds
Election results	8 October 2000	53.90	17.30	15.57	5.95	3.05	1.43	1.01	0.79	0.51	0.22	0.16	0.10	-	-
CBOS	Sept.-Oct. 2000	55	13	7	6	3	1	1	1	<0.5	<0.5	<0.5	0	1	12
CBOS	September 2000	62	10	7	5	2	2	1	1	<0.5	<0.5	<0.5	0	1	8
CBOS	August 2000	62	11	6	4	2	1	4	1	0	<0.5	0	0	1	8
CBOS	July 2000	62	11	7	3	3	1	3	1	-	-	<0.5	0	3	6
CBOS	June 2000	65	11	5	2	3	1	3	<0.5	-	-	<0.5	0	2	7
Election called by Sejm Marshal Maciej Płażyński (16 June 2000)
CBOS	May 2000	62	11	4	4	3	2	3	<0.5	-	-	<0.5	0	1	6
CBOS	April 2000	61	12	4	-	2	<0.5	4	-	-	-	<0.5	0	3	8
CBOS	January 2000	55	8	6	2	3	2	4	-	-	-	<0.5	0	3	8

== Results ==
Incumbent President Kwaśniewski won the election in the first round receiving almost 54% of the vote. Independent Andrzej Olechowski came second beating Solidarity candidate Krzaklewski into third place. Meanwhile, former President Lech Wałęsa only won 1% of the vote and following the election stood down as leader of his small Christian Democratic party.

Candidate	Party	Votes	%
Aleksander Kwaśniewski	Independent (SLD)	9,485,224	53.90
Andrzej Olechowski	Independent (SKL)	3,044,141	17.30
Marian Krzaklewski	Solidarity Electoral Action	2,739,621	15.57
Jarosław Kalinowski	Polish People's Party	1,047,949	5.95
Andrzej Lepper	Self-Defence of the Republic of Poland	537,570	3.05
Janusz Korwin-Mikke	Real Politics Union	252,499	1.43
Lech Wałęsa	Christian Democracy of the Third Polish Republic	178,590	1.01
Jan Łopuszański	Polish Agreement	139,682	0.79
Dariusz Grabowski	Coalition for Poland	89,002	0.51
Piotr Ikonowicz	Polish Socialist Party	38,672	0.22
Tadeusz Wilecki	National Party	28,805	0.16
Bogdan Pawłowski	Independent	17,164	0.10
Total		17,598,919	100.00
Valid votes		17,598,919	98.93
Invalid/blank votes		190,312	1.07
Total votes		17,789,231	100.00
Registered voters/turnout		29,122,304	61.08
Source: PKW

Vote share
Kwaśniewski	53.90%
Olechowski	17.30%
Krzaklewski	15.57%
Kalinowski	5.95%
Lepper	3.05%
Korwin-Mikke	1.43%
Wałęsa	1.01%
Others	1.78%
