= Wielkie =

- Village
- Location within Poland
- Coordinates: 51°27′27″N 22°16′40″E
- Country: Poland
- Voivodeship: Lublin
- County: Lubartów
- Gmina: Abramów

Population
  - Total: 534

Wielkie [ˈvjɛlkʲɛ] is a village in the administrative district of Gmina Abramów, within Lubartów County, Lublin Voivodeship, in eastern Poland.

In 2005 the village had a population of 534.
