= Wildstein =

Wildstein may refer to:

- Skalná, a city in the Czech Republic known as "Wildstein" in German
- Bronisław Wildstein (born 1952), a former Polish dissident, a journalist, and a freelance author
  - Wildstein list, a list distributed by Bronisław Wildstein of people associated with the Polish intelligence services
- David Wildstein (born 1961), an American businessman, Republican Party politician, and political blogger
