= Independent Students' Association =

Polish student society

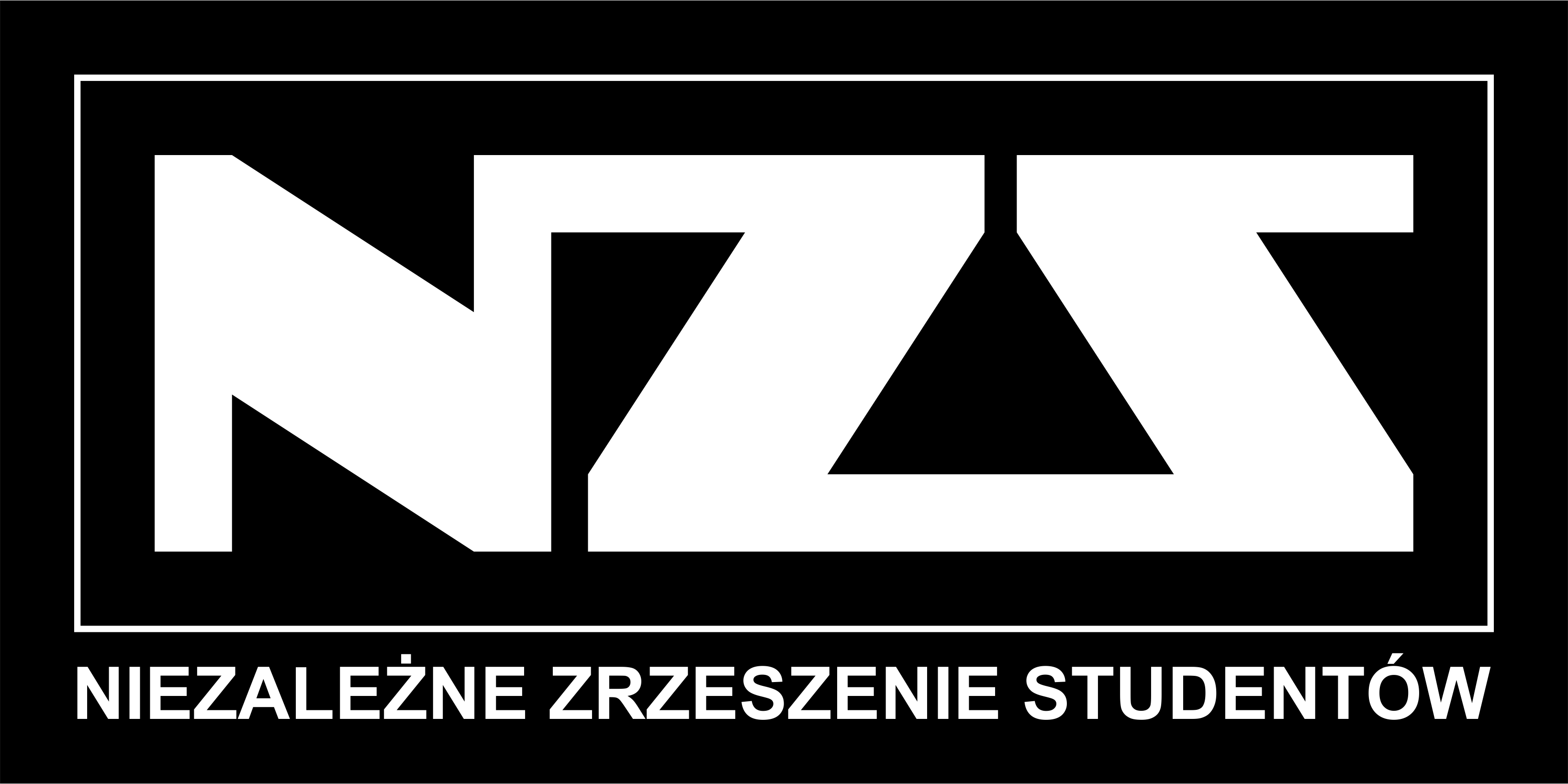
- Logo of the NZS
- Formation: 22 September 1980
- Headquarters: Warsaw
- Location: Poland
- Website: https://nzs.org.pl/

Independent Students' Association (Polish: Niezależne Zrzeszenie Studentów, NZS) is a Polish student society, created in October 1980, in the aftermath of the Gdańsk Agreement and the anti-government strike actions (see: History of Solidarity). It was a student arm, or suborganization, of Solidarity, and together with it, as well as other similar organizations, was banned after the implementation of martial law in Poland (December 13, 1981). Some activists were arrested, and others organized an underground NZS. After the fall of Communism in 1989, the organization was recreated, and its focus was changed from political to cultural, although it still stands by its origins, as seen by Polish students’ support for the Orange Revolution in Ukraine. It now is the largest independent student organization in Poland, with 90 chapters at Polish universities and a total of 20,000 members.

== Beginnings ==
The first meeting of students demanding independent Association took place on August 27, 1980, in Gdańsk. On September 2, the Temporary Founding Committee of the University of Gdańsk was created, followed by similar bodies in other Polish cities, such as Warsaw, Poznań, and Kraków.

Between 18 and 19 October 1980, at the Warsaw University of Technology, a founding meeting of a newly created student organization took place, with 60 chapters, representing different Polish universities and colleges. At this point, the name Independent Students’ Association was approved. There were other suggestions for the name, such as Solidarity of the Association of Polish Students, but they were not popular. During the meeting, it was decided that the NZS would be seated in Warsaw, and the National Founding Committee was established, with eleven members (among them Maciej Kuroń, and Piotr Bikont). The NZS associated itself with the late 1970s organization, Student Committee of Solidarity, created in 1977, following the murder of Stanisław Pyjas.

In 1980, the Association may have been viewed as a student equivalent of Solidarity, as it was created following the strikes of the so-called Polish August 1980. It led to the gathering of young people who wished to organize themselves independently of the Communist regime. They called for democratization of Polish universities, as well as respect for the Polish patriotic traditions of fighting for independence. The NZS was an alternative to the official Polish Students' Association (ZSP), which was subordinated to the Polish United Workers' Party.

== Legalization ==
The first request for legalization of the NZS was presented in the Provincial Court in Warsaw on October 20, 1980, but the Justice refused. On November 13, the Warsaw Court stated that only laborers were entitled to create trade unions. In response, strikes and protests were organized throughout the fall of 1980 and winter of 1980-1981, with the most extensive taking place at the University of Poznań (November 1980), and the University of Łódź (January - February 1981). Among those who took part in the Łódź strikes was an international soccer player, Stanisław Terlecki, who used his connections to get food for students. Desperate students of the Warsaw University began to occupy the college in late November 1980, but due to the mediation of rector Henryk Samsonowicz, the protest was terminated.

=== 1981 strikes in Łódź ===
On January 11, 1981, students of the Mathematics - Physics - Chemistry Department of the University of Łódź began a strike, which on January 21 spread across the whole college. According to NZS sources, it was the longest occupational strike of students in the history of Europe, with 10 000 students participating. On February 9, University of Poznań joined their Łódź colleagues, declaring a solidarity strike.

On February 17, 1981, the government accepted registration of the Association, under the condition that it would abide by the Constitution. The following day, the strikes in Łódź ended. The government pledged to grant more autonomy to the students and agreed that the students would no longer be obliged to study the Russian language. Another concession was the elimination of compulsory Marxist-Leninist courses. The Government's decision to register the association was met by Łódź student's applause. The students stood up and sang the Polish national anthem. The Łódź Agreement is still regarded as the student equivalent of the Gdańsk Agreement. Furthermore, the student strikes in Łódź were mentioned by the Communist services as one of reasons for establishing the law.

== Period of independence ==
Between 3–6 April 1981, at Kraków's Pedagogical University, the First Meeting of NZS Delegates took place. It gathered 240 activists from 66 Polish colleges and universities (out of 89 such schools existing then nationwide). The National Coordinating Commission was elected, and the first chairman of the NZS was Jagiellonian University's Jarosław Guzy. Statutes of the Association were written by a young student of law, Jan Maria Rokita.

The Association quickly grew, reaching by May 1981 some 80 000 members. Its Coordinating Commission was planning to open an independent students’ magazine, but the government refused, explaining that there was "lack of paper". NZS was a very active association, which organized meetings with key members of the opposition movement (such as Adam Michnik, Lech Wałęsa, Jacek Kuroń). Furthermore, the Association was deeply engaged in political actions. On May 25, 1981, in several Polish cities, the students organized street marches in defence of political prisoners. In November 1981, 55 000 students of 81 Polish colleges declared a general strike to demand the ouster of a newly appointed rector at the Radom Engineering School.

In late November and early December 1981, another important event took place. On November 25, students of Warsaw's School of Fire Service Officers went on strike to protest their college's being subjected directly to the Ministry of Interior and Administration versus the Higher Education Bill. The cadets demanded both an exemption from police duties, and academic rights.

== Banning and re-establishment ==
Polish students did not enjoy their freedom for long. Following the martial law in Poland, the Association was banned on February 5, 1981, and many of its activists were arrested. The NZS was still active in the underground, especially in large population centers, such as Warsaw, Wrocław and Kraków. Some of its members, such as Teodor Klincewicz from Warsaw, were actively involved in various forms of anti-government protests. Also, students of the Law Department at Łódź University, in opposition to martial law, organized a sit-in, which was brutally broken by the riot police. Another strike was broken at Kraków's Pedagogical University. At some point in the mid-1980s, the Association began cooperation with high-school students organization Federation of Fighting Youth.

The NZS, which in the years 1984-1985 was in the decline, began to flourish, beginning in 1986, when a new generation of students replaced the old. The number of self-published magazines grew, new chapters were created, and finally, in September 1988, during the Third Meeting of NZS Delegates in Gdańsk, new leaders were elected. Soon afterwards, the Registration Committees were opened across the nation, and thousands of students joined the Association.

During the round table talks, it was agreed that the NZS would be re-registered. However, the government did not keep this promise. This resulted in the creation of the National Student Strike Committee, which consisted of: Tomasz Ziemiński, Mariusz Kamiński, Przemysław Gosiewski, P. Nycz, W. Kiliński, Sławomir Skrzypek, R. Kosiorek, Grzegorz Schetyna, B. Pichur, Artur Olszewski, Igor Wójcik, P. Janiszewski, A. Jasionowski, K. Zemler, R. Bitner, A. Szczepkowski and P. Swaczyna.

As Lech Kaczyński later recalled, the Communists did not want to give up their monopoly of youth organizations. Most Polish colleges began a sit-in, and in Kraków, street fights erupted. During the historic semi-free June 1989 elections, the NZS actively helped Solidarity candidates.

The Association was re-legalized on September 22, 1989, when Poland was already ruled by the oppositional government of Tadeusz Mazowiecki. In the 1990s, NZS limited its political activities, concentrating on cultural events, as well as entertainment. Across the years, NZS total membership has been around 180 000. Several of its activists are now public figures - politicians, journalists, businessmen, artists. Among the most prominent are Donald Tusk, Grzegorz Schetyna, Waldemar Pawlak, Cezary Grabarczyk, Bogdan Zdrojewski, Maciej Płażyński, Marek Jurek, Włodzimierz Julian Korab-Karpowicz, Jan Maria Rokita, Maciej Kuroń, Bronisław Wildstein, Marcin Meller, Paweł Piskorski, Adam Bielan, Tadeusz Nowicki.

== See also ==
- Poznań protests of 1956
- Polish protests of 1970
- 1980 Lublin strikes
- Rural Solidarity
