= Bogusław Sonik =

Polish politician (born 1953)

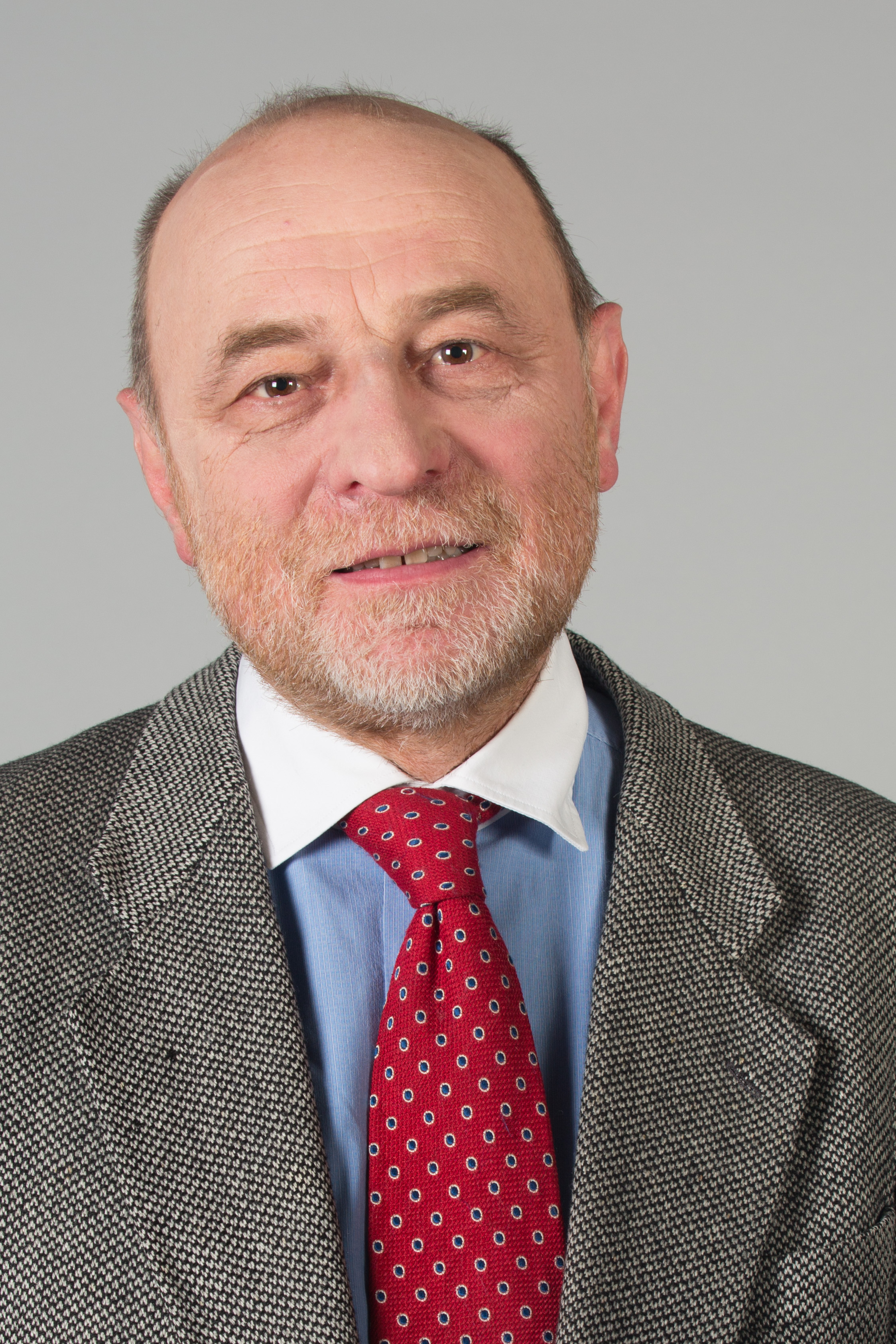

Member of the European Parliament for Poland
- In office 30 July 2004 – 2018

Personal details
- Born: 3 December 1953 (age 72) Kraków
- Party: Civic Platform (2002-2023)
- Spouse: Liliana Sonik
- Children: Janeczka Jacek
- Occupation: Politician, journalist
- Profession: Politician
- Website: http://boguslawsonik.pl

Bogusław Andrzej Sonik (born 3 December 1953 in Kraków) is a Polish politician who was Member of the European Parliament for the Lesser Poland Voivodeship and Swietokrzyskie Voivodeship with the Civic Platform, part of the European People's Party and sits on the European Parliament's Committee on the Environment, Public Health and Food Safety.

Sonik was a substitute for the Committee on Civil Liberties, Justice and Home Affairs, a member of the delegation for relations with the Maghreb countries and the Arab Maghreb Union (including Libya) and a substitute for the delegation for relations with the Mashreq countries.

== Education ==
- 1978: Master of Law, Jagiellonian University

== Solidarity ==
As a student in the 1970s he became active in anti-communist opposition. He was a member of Beczka, a university chaplaincy run by the Dominicans. He also cooperated with Komitet Obrony Robotników (Committee for the Protection of Workers). Following the death of his friend Staszek Pyjas he and his other friends from the opposition founded Studencki Komitet Solidarności (Student Committee of Solidarity). 1980 saw his active participation in the creation and organization of the independent trade union Solidarity. He was the vice-president of the Małopolska region Solidarity management until 1982. He was the chairman of the Małopolska region delegation to the 1st National Assembly of the Independent Solidarity Trade Union. He was interned on the first day of martial law. in 1983 he started working in Znak publishing house and was one of the founders of a socio-cultural magazine called Arka published in the underground press.

== Emigration ==
1983 marked the beginning of Sonik's 14-year-long stay in France. At first he organized aid for the underground structures of Solidarność and he studied at the Institut d'Études Politiques de Paris. He was also an honorary member of the Association of Polish Physicians in France and he initiated and supported their operations. In 1985 he began his work as journalist at the Polish Section of Radio France International and BBC, he also cooperated with the Polish Section of Deutschlandfunk and he had his own program on Radio Free Europe. He published in Tygodnik Powszechny. In 1990 he became the director of the Polish Institute in France and was nominated Minister Plenipotentiary of the Polish Embassy in Paris and he occupied both these positions until 1996. Together with the Municipality of Paris and other French cities he organized presentations of Polish culture and art. In 1993 he was given the medal of Chevalier dans l'Ordre des Arts et des Lettres by the French Minister of Culture, Jack Lang.

== Return to Poland ==
He returned to Poland in 1996 to become the director of Kraków 2000 - European City of Culture Festival. This was the largest cultural event in Poland and lasted four years. At that time he managed to obtain an extra 54 million zloty for the culture, he set up the Festival Bureau and the Cultural Information Centre. He was the organiser of the Kraków edition of Ludwig van Beethoven Easter Festival which joined the prestigious European Festivals Association as one of the key projects of Kraków 2000. Since 2001 Sonik has been on the board of The Association of European Cities and Months of Culture with its seat in Luxembourg. Following the flood of 1997 he embarked on a scheme to save the Kościuszko Mound in Kraków and managed to collect approximately 15 million zloty for its restoration. The Kościuszko Mound reopened to public in 2002. In cooperation with his friends from the Students' Solidarity Committee he established the Maj77 Association which organises events propagating democracy, freedom of speech and human rights. He is active in the Institute of Heritage aiming to establish the European Culture Festival, and which also supports and promotes traditional professions, artistic craft and protects landscapes. In January 2003 he became the head of promotion of the city of Kraków and he helped establish a long-term promotion strategy for the city.

== Local government ==
In 1998 Bogusław Sonik became involved in local government and he was elected to the Voivodeship council. He became the Chairman of Małopolska Council and he worked for the region for two terms in office. He strove to develop tourism, protect cultural heritage and the environment. He came up with the idea of organising Małopolska Region days of Cultural Heritage and of building new bicycle paths. He supported the modernisation of flood banks, a scheme to save chestnut trees from the horse chestnut miner plague and to protect natural features of historic importance. In October 2002 he again ran in the local election recommended by Platforma Obywatelska and obtained one of the best results. He won the trust of councillors from Civic Platform and Law and Justice, and he became the head of the largest group in the local government where he was the chairman of the Environmental Protection and Water Management Committee.

He supervised the implementation of projects financed from the European structural funds and the Voivodeship Environmental Protection Fund. He supports numerous initiatives for regional development including contracts with cheap airlines and agro-tourism. He is a delegate at the Association for Culture of European Cities and Regions (Les Rencontres). His interest in Europe has resulted in the formation of the first Polish European Association of Platforma Obywatelska. He is the author of numerous analyses on the European integration published in the "Rzeczpospolita" daily and in the local press.

== European Parliament ==
On 13 June 2004 Bogusław Sonik was elected as member of the European Parliament. As a member of Platforma Obywatelska (Civic Platform) he belongs to the European People's Party-European Democrats which is the most numerous group in the European Parliament.

His time at the Parliament is divided between three committees:

- The Committee on Environment, Public Health and Food Safety,
- The Temporary Committee on climate change,
- The Subcommittee on Human Rights

and six interparliamentary delegations:

- Delegation for relations with the Mashreq countries,
- Delegation to the African, Caribbean, Pacific-European Union Joint Parliamentary Assembly,
- Delegation to the Euro- Latin American Parliamentary Assembly,
- Delegation to the EU-Moldova parliamentary cooperation committee,
- Delegation for relations with countries of Central America,
- Delegation for relations with the Maghreb countries and the Arab Maghreb Union (including Libya).

In the course of his work he has become involved in many issues which are important for the functioning of the entire European Union.

He is an expert on numerous European initiatives in culture and education including the European Committee initiative establishing the Culture programme 2007–2013, Citizens for Europe and European Capitals of Culture. He co-wrote numerous resolutions concerning the protection of human rights in countries such as Syria, Lebanon, Cuba and Belarus, the Republic of Moldova and particularly in Trans-Dniestr.

He has been done much to prepare a European Parliament resolution to commemorate the victims of holocaust, anti-Semitism and racism. He fought that the final version of the document approved on 27 January 2005 should refer to "Nazi Germany camps" in relation to concentration camps set up in Poland during World War 2.

He participated in legislative work on the REACH directive concerning the registration, assessment and permits for chemical substances. He defended the interests of Polish entrepreneurs in the course of legislative works on a directive concerning the definition, description, presentation and labelling of spirits.

According to a report prepared by the Wrocław University in June 2007 he is one of 10 most active members of the Polish delegation in the European Parliament.

He served in the European parliament until 2014.

== Later career ==
From 2015-2018 he was Member of Parliament, from 2018-2019 again Member of European Parliament, and finally again Member of Parliament from 2019 to 2023. In May 2023, he resigned from membership in the Civic Platform, after party leader Donald Tusk required all candidates for parliament to support liberalizing abortion laws.

In 2024 he declared his support for Karol Nawrocki for president.

== Decorations ==
- 1993: Knight of the French Order of Art and Culture
- 1999: Order of Merit for Polish Culture

== See also ==
- 2004 European Parliament election in Poland
