= Student Committee of Solidarity =

The Student Committee of Solidarity (Polish: Studencki Komitet Solidarności (SKS)) was a student group created in Kraków in 1977 whose purpose was opposition to the Communist government in Poland. The committee was formed in the aftermath of the murder of Stanisław Pyjas, a student activist, probably killed by members of the communist Secret Services.

The funeral of Pyjas turned into a student demonstration in the streets of Kraków (later called the "Black Procession"), the largest of its kind in Kraków since the March events of 1968. In the autumn of 1977 similar committees formed in other cities; Warsaw, Gdańsk, Poznań and Wrocław, as well in Szczecin in 1978. The student organizations were generally associated with the Komitet Obrony Robotnikóws (KOR) and carried out their activities mostly, but not exclusively, in academic settings. Where it proved possible, students associated with the committees also supported workers' organizations. The committees printed underground newspapers, organized petitions regarding living standards in student housing and demanded the replacement of communist controlled student groups by independent ones. Another purpose of the committees was to report on the kind of abuses by the communist Secret Services that had led to Pyjas' murder. In a more or less spontaneous ways, the Student Committees of Solidarity led to formation of Independent Students Unions, particularly by 1980.

Many activists of the committees later, after fall of communism in Poland, became well known public figures, among others; Bronisław Wildstein, Bogusław Sonik, Liliana Batko-Sonik, Lesław Maleszka, Róża Thun, Ludwik Dorn, Magdalena Modzelewska, Elżbieta Majewska, and Jacek Rakowiecki
