= Janusz Kurtyka =

Polish historian

Dr Janusz Kurtyka
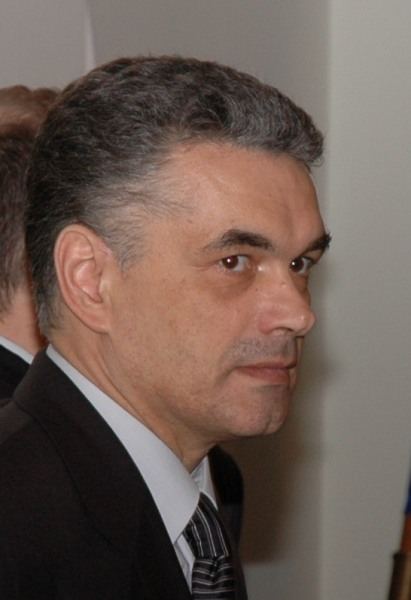
- Janusz Kurtyka

President of the Institute of National Remembrance
- In office 2005 – 10 April 2010
- Preceded by: Leon Kieres
- Succeeded by: Łukasz Kamiński

Personal details
- Born: 13 August 1960
- Died: 10 April 2010 (aged 49)
- Profession: Historian

Janusz Marek Kurtyka (13 August 1960 – 10 April 2010) was a Polish historian, and from December 2005 until his death in the 2010 Polish Air Force Tu-154 crash, the second president of the Institute of National Remembrance (IPN).

Kurtyka was born in Kraków and obtained his degree in the History and Philosophy Department of the Jagiellonian University. He had been a historian at the Polish Academy of Sciences since 1985 where he specialized in Polish medieval and communist era history, modern history and historical methodology. He finished his PhD in 1995 and was habilitated in 2000. He was a contributor to Wielka Encyklopedia PWN and Polski Słownik Biograficzny (Polish Biographical Dictionary) and the author of more than 140 academic publications.

In the People's Republic of Poland, Kurtyka was a member of the democratic opposition to communism and an activist with the Independent Students Union and the trade union Solidarity. Between 1989 and 2000 he was the presidents of the Kraków office of Solidarity in the Historical Institute PAN.

After the Institute of National Remembrance (a Polish government-affiliated research institute which investigates both Nazi and Communist crimes committed in Poland) was created in 1998, Kurtyka was the first president of its Kraków branch. In April 2005 he was recommended by the Board of the Institute for the position of the president and was approved by the Polish Sejm and Senate in December of that year. He took his oath of office on 29 December 2005.

In 2007, Kurtyka was awarded the Ukrainian Order of Merit, third degree and in April 2009 he was awarded the Commander's Cross with Star of the Order of Polonia Restituta by the President of Poland, Lech Kaczynski.

Kurtyka was on the Tupolev Tu-154 flight of the 36th Special Aviation Regiment carrying the President of Poland Lech Kaczyński which crashed near Smolensk-North airport near Katyn, Russia, on 10 April 2010, killing all aboard.

Days before he died he called for "the results of the Russian investigation into Katyn massacre to be declassified and for the Russian archives to be opened". The post which was left open by his death was considered particularly problematic due to the difficulty there would be in replacing him.

After a mass in the Saints Peter and Paul Church in Kraków he was buried in the Rakowicki Cemetery on 23 April 2010. On 16 April 2010 he was posthumously awarded the Grand Cross of the Order of Polonia Restituta.

== Selected publications ==
- Generał Leopold Okulicki "Niedźwiadek" (1898–1946), (General Leopold Okulicki, "Niedźwiadek" (1898–1946)), 1989
- Konspiracja i opór społeczny na Podkarpaciu w okresie PRL (red.), (Conspiracy and Social Resistance in Subcarpathia During the PRL (ed.)), 2007
- Latyfundium Tęczyńskie. Dobra i właściciele (XIV–XVII wiek), (The Latifundia of the Tęczyński Family. Estate and Owners (14th through 17th centuries)), 1999
- Odrodzone królestwo. Monarchia Władysława Łokietka i Kazimierza Wielkiego w świetle nowszych badań, (Kingdom Reborn. The Monarchy of Władysław Łokietek and Kazimierz Wielki in Light of New Research), 2001
- Tęczyńscy. Studium z dziejów polskiej elity możnowładczej w średniowieczu, (The Tęczyński Family. A Study from the History of a Polish Medieval Magnates), 1997
- "Freedom And Independence - Zrzeszenie "Wolność i Niezawisłość, WiN", A Historical Brief

Cultural offices
Preceded by Leon Kieres	President of the Institute of National Remembrance; 2005–2010	Succeeded by Franciszek Gryciuk (acting); Łukasz Kamiński
