= Maciej Kuroń =

Polish journalist and culinary publicist (1960–2008)

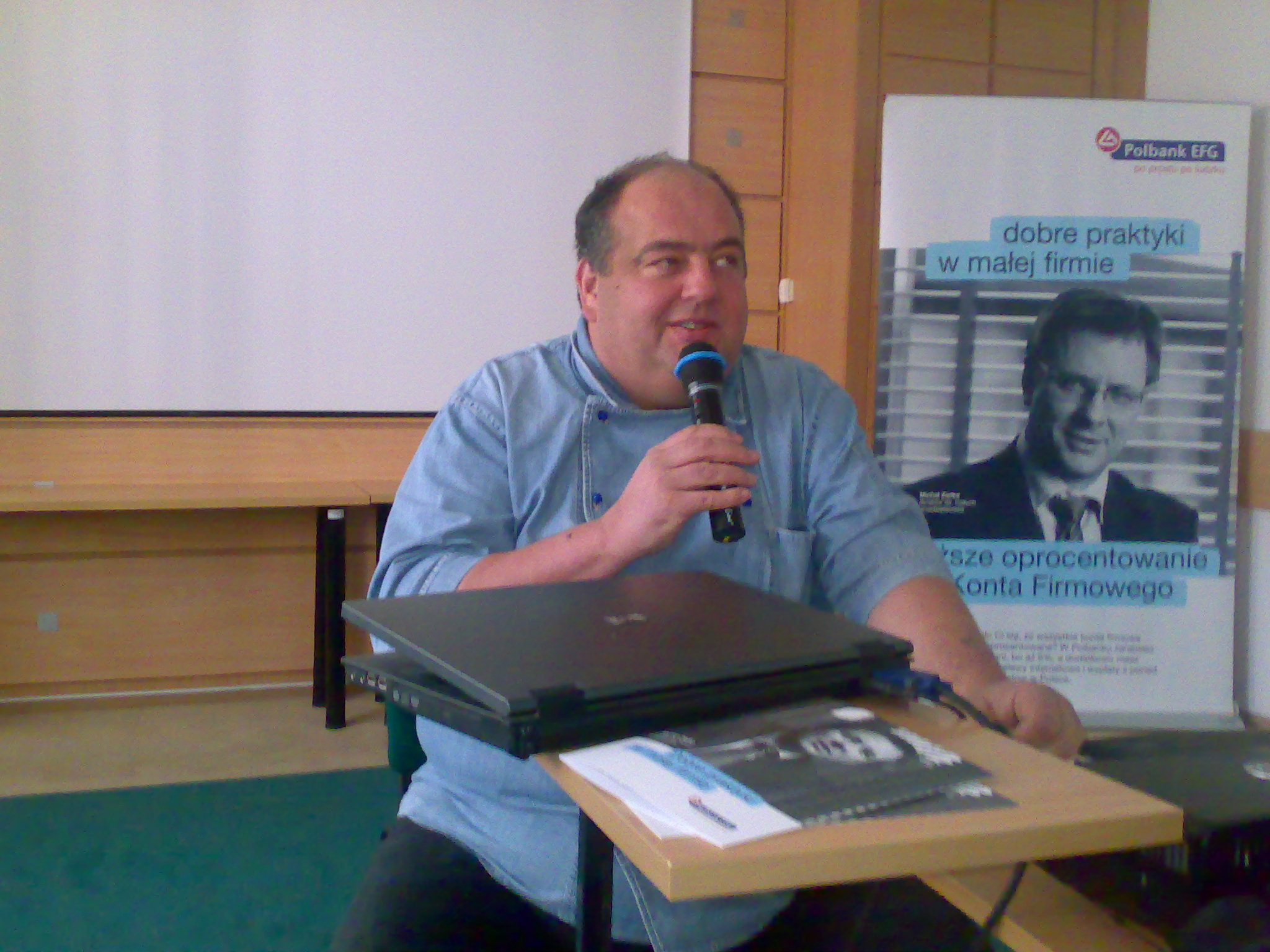
Maciej Kuroń

Maciej Kuroń (Polish pronunciation: [ˈmat͡ɕɛj ˈkurɔɲ]; 8 March 1960–25 December 2008), was a Polish journalist and culinary publicist. He was a host of television culinary shows, which made him very popular in Poland. He was the son of Jacek Kuroń.

In 1980, as a student of Pedagogical College in Olsztyn, Kuroń represented Olsztyn's students in Warsaw's Founding Committee of the Independent Students Union. During the martial law in Poland, he was in 1982 expelled from college by Communist authorities. Later, he studied at The Culinary Institute of America, and in 1998 became host of a TV show Cook together with Kuroń, presented by the TVN. He also authored several cookbooks, including Polish Cuisine.

A father of four, Kuroń died unexpectedly of acute heart failure, on 25 December 2008 at his home in Izabelin near Warsaw. He was buried on 7 January 2009, at the Powązki Cemetery. On the same day, President Lech Kaczynski awarded him the Officer's Cross of the Polonia Restituta "for outstanding achievements in his work for democratic change in Poland and for his involvement in shaping the social attitudes of the Poles".
