= Polish Students' Association =

Student association in Poland

- Zrzeszenie Studentów Polskich
- Formation: 1950; 76 years ago
- Founded at: Warsaw University of Technology
- Type: Student society
- Headquarters: 48 Mokotowska Street
- Location: Warsaw
- Region served: Poland
- Chair: Ewa Sosińska
- Students: 10,000
- Website: zsp.pl

Polish Students' Association (Polish: Zrzeszenie Studentów Polskich) is the oldest of Polish student societies. It was created in 1950 in Polish People's Republic. Currently it has about 10,000 members in about 100 academic institutions.

== See also ==
- Independent Students Union
- Union of Polish Youth
