= Tomasz Greniuch =

Polish historian

Tomasz Greniuch (1982-) is a Polish historian, formerly employed by the Institute of National Remembrance. In his youth he was associated with far-right groups which caused a media controversy in 2021.

== Biography ==
Greniuch is among the great-grandsons of Józef Piłsudski. He graduated in history from the University of Opole and received his doctorate from the Catholic University of Lublin on the cursed soldiers who fought under the command of Henryk Flame. An active cadre of National Radical Camp (ONR) — a fascist anti-semitic ultranationalist organization — and spokesperson of its Opole circle, Greniuch commemorated anti-Jewish pogroms, greeted others with the Nazi salute, and raised White supremacist slogans. On an occasion when he was investigated by the local police and threatened with expulsion by the university, he defended the Nazi salute, claiming that it was a pan-nationalist greeting with its origins among the Romans and he cannot be blamed for its usurpation by Hitler.

In 2018, Greniuch joined the Institute of National Remembrance (IPN) as a historian. In an interview in 2019, Greniuch maintained subscribing to ONR's views but lamented having to temper his behaviour in light of professional commitments.

=== Termination from IPN ===
On 9 February 2021, the incumbent Law and Justice Party government appointed Greniuch as the acting head of the Wroclaw branch of the IPN. The decision spurred controversy and drew sharp criticism from the political opposition, historians, journalists, survivors of the Holocaust, and Israel. In response, Greniuch tendered an apology for his "youthful bravado" and cited a list of relatives who fell victim to the Nazis; though the IPN initially upheld his appointment, highlighting his apology and freedom of speech, a fortnight later, they accepted his resignation and dismissed him for corroding public trust in the institution.
