= Róża Thun =

Polish politician (born 1954)

Róża von Thun und Hohenstein MEP
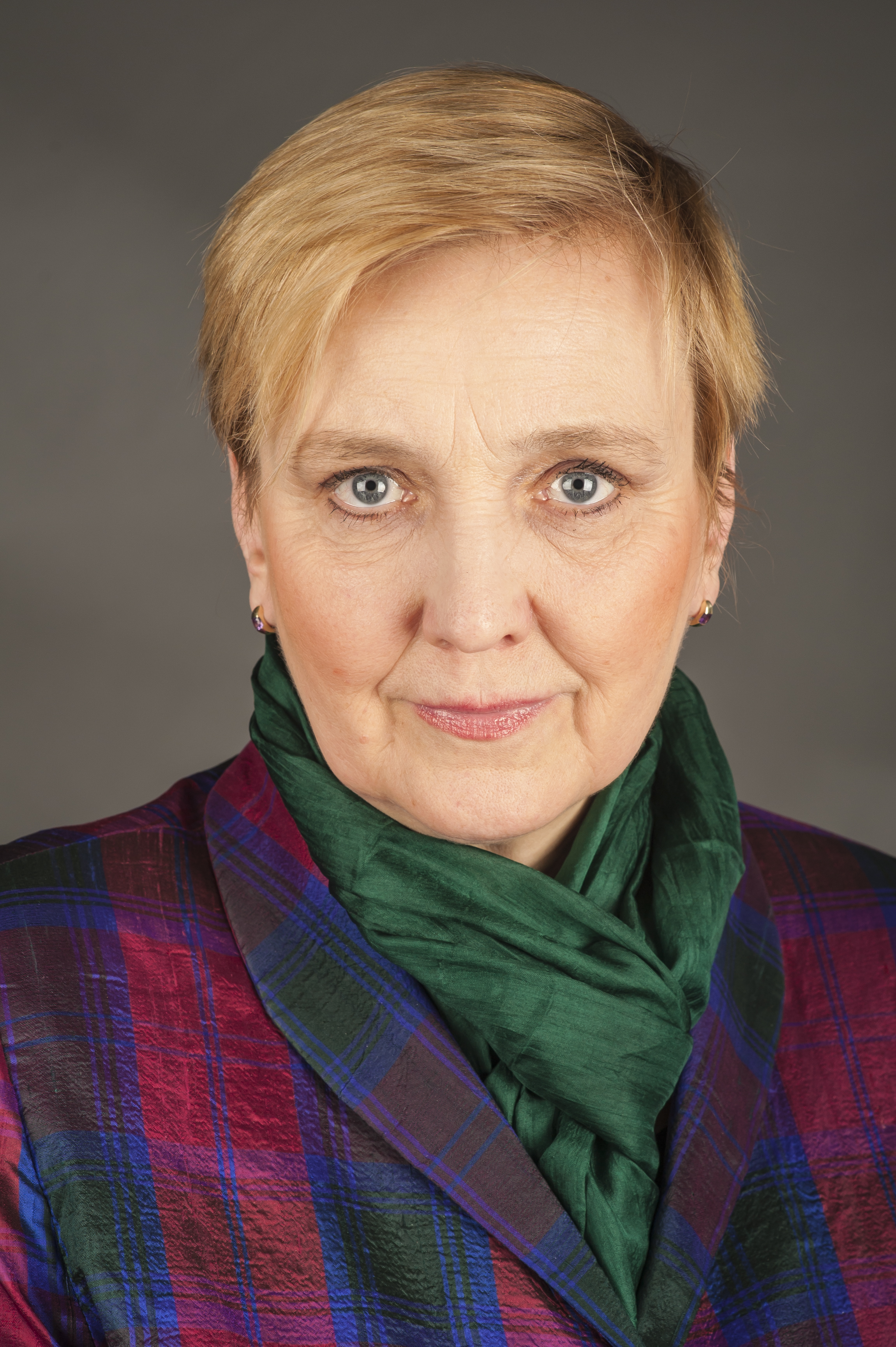

Member of the European Parliament for Lesser Poland and Świętokrzyskie
- In office 14 July 2009 – 16 July 2024

Personal details
- Born: Róża Maria Woźniakowska; 13 April 1954 (age 72) Kraków, Poland
- Party: Civic Platform (until 2021); Poland 2050 (since 2021)
- Other political affiliations: Renew Europe
- Spouse: Franz von Thun-Hohenstein
- Children: 4
- Education: Jagiellonian University
- Occupation: Politician
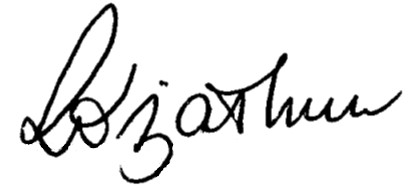
- Signature
- Website: www.rozathun.pl

Róża Maria Thun (Róża Maria Barbara Fürstin von Thun und Hohenstein, née Woźniakowska, born 13 April 1954), is a Polish politician, more usually known as Róża Thun than by her formal style of Countess and from 1990 her style changed to Princess.

Thun has served as a Member of the European Parliament (MEP) for Poland, representing Civic Platform since 2009, being returned to Brussels at the 2014 European elections.

Previously, Róża Thun was involved in two anti-communist organizations (the Student Committee of Solidarity and the Workers' Defence Committee) in the People's Republic of Poland.

After the fall of Communism, she was the chairwoman of the Polish Robert Schuman Foundation, a non-governmental organization promoting European integration.

Thun was also the head of the European Commission representation to Poland between 2005 and 2009. Since 2011 she has been Vice President of the European Movement International.

== Early life and ancestry ==
Thun was born Róża Woźniakowska, Prawdzic coat of arms on 13 April 1954 at Kraków, Poland.

Her father, a Polish nobleman, Jacek Woźniakowski (1920-2012), was a professor in the Catholic University of Lublin (who also served as Mayor of Kraków for 1990-1991).

Her mother, Countess Maria Karolina of Plater-Zyberk (b. 1925), was a biologist and an expert on the species of bats.

=== Marriage and children ===
In 1981, Thun married Franz, 5th Prince von Thun und Hohenstein (b. 1948), an economist. As the Head of the family, he nominally holds the title of Prince in Austria and Imperial Count.

Through her mother, Franz and Róża are 3rd cousins, as both share mutual descent from Count Friedrich Franz von Thun und Hohenstein (1810-1881) and his wife, Countess Leopoldine von Lamberg (1825-1902).

Her formal style by courtesy upon marriage became Rosa Gräfin von Thun und Hohenstein: Gräfin is the German equivalent rank to Countess.

In 1990, when her husband succeeded as the Head of the family and nominally became Fürst, her style changed to Rosa Fürstin von Thun und Hohenstein.

They have four children: Christoph, Maria Zita, Sophie Amélie, and Jadwiga Wanda.

== Political activities ==
=== Before the fall of communism in Poland ===
In 1979, Woźniakowska graduated from the Jagiellonian University with a Master's degree in English Philology. She became a member, and later spokesperson, of the Student Committee of Solidarity in Kraków. Between 1977 and 1980, she was active on the Workers' Defence Committee (an organization aiding political prisoners and their families).

=== After 1989 ===
Between 1992 and 2005, Thun was Director-General and Chairwoman of the Polish Robert Schuman Foundation (Polish: Polska Fundacja imienia Roberta Schumana), a non-governmental organization promoting European integration. From 1998 to 2000, she served on Warsaw City Council, and from 2005 until 2009, she was the head of the European Commission Representation to Poland.

=== European Parliament ===
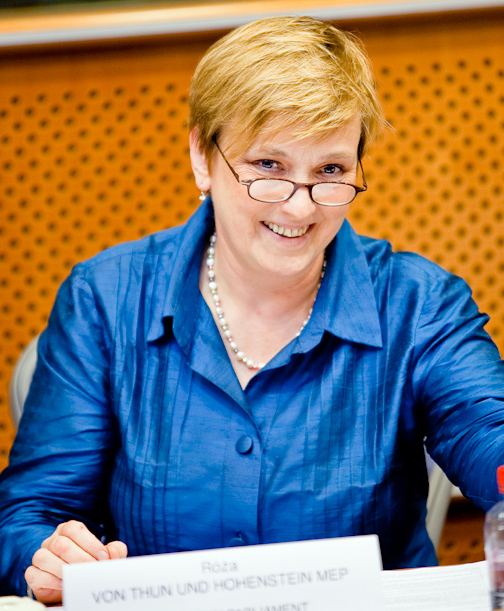
Róża Thun, 2010

Thun was elected a European Parliament Member (MEP) at the European elections of 2009. She won some 150,000 votes in the Lesser Poland and Świętokrzyskie constituency which she represents. Although Thun stood on the Civic Platform parliamentary list, she only joined the party following her election; she left the party in 2021.

As an MEP, Thun is a member of the Committee on the Internal Market and Consumer Protection. In addition to her committee assignments, she is part of the parliament's delegations for relations with Israel and to the Euro-Mediterranean Parliamentary Assembly. She is also a member of the European Internet Forum and the Spinelli Group.

Citing disagreements over key policy areas like environmental protection, Thun left the Civic Platform, and later also the European People’s Party group, to join Poland 2050 and Renew Europe in 2021.

==== Ryszard Czarnecki controversy ====
On 26 April 2009 – less than two months before the European elections – Ryszard Czarnecki, a Polish MEP for the Law and Justice Party, wrote a blog entry, describing Thun's "troubles" with the Polish National Electoral Commission. According to Czarnecki, the Civic Platform intended to register her candidacy under the name of Róża Thun, but the Commission refused, stating that according to the regulations, all candidates must appear under their full names on the ballot papers. "And so, the voters will see Róża Maria Gräfin von Thun und Hohenstein in her full grace", Czarnecki wrote. He further asserted that "a Gräfin with a German-sounding name might do harm to the Civic Platform".

On 20 May 2009, it was revealed that Czarnecki himself would appear on the ballot sheets not under his assumed Polish name of Ryszard Henryk, but as Richard Henry, since he was born in the United Kingdom. Czarnecki stated that his situation is different, as he didn't choose his names, while Thun chose her surname by marrying her husband. Thun retorted her name came out of love, adding "I pity Richard Henry Czarnecki".

In January 2018, Czarnecki compared Thun to a szmalcownik, people who blackmailed Jews in hiding during the Holocaust, for her criticism of the Polish government. As a result of these comments, Thun received death threats. In 2019, Czarnecki lost a libel case against Thun.

== Political positions ==
In November 2017, Thun joined a parliamentary majority by voting in favor of a resolution invoking Article 7 of the Treaty on European Union, thereby potentially stripping Poland of voting rights in the EU for violating the common values of the bloc, including the rule of law. Shortly after, her political opponents had pictures of Thun and five other Polish politicians strung from a makeshift gallows in a public square in Katowice.

In 2020, Thun was among nearly six EPP members who voted to expel Tamás Deutsch from their parliamentary group after the latter had compared comments made by group leader Manfred Weber to the slogans of the Gestapo and Hungary’s communist-era secret police; Deutsch was eventually suspended but not expelled from the group.

== Honours ==
- 2017 - Internal Market and Consumer Protection Award
- Officer, Order of Polonia Restituta
- Officer, Ordre national du Mérite (France)
- Grand Officer, Order of the Crown (Belgium)
- Knight, Order of Merit (Italy)

Thun has been nominated for the prize of "best MEP" in 2011 and in 2013 by The Parliament Magazine in the Internal Market and Consumer Protection category. These prizes have been awarded since 2005, and nominations are made by European organizations, associations and institutions which monitor the workings of the EP. 3 names are shortlisted in each category, with MEPs voting for the winner. In 2017 she won the award in the internal market category.
