= Lesław Maleszka =

- Born: November 15, 1952 (age 73); Zakopane, Polish People's Republic
- Education: Jagiellonian University
- Known for: Member of the anticommunist student movements

Lesław Maleszka (born 15 November 1952 in Zakopane) is a Polish librarian, journalist, opposition activist in the Polish People's Republic, secret collaborator of the Polish Communist secret police.

== Biography ==
In 1977 he graduated from the Faculty of Polish Studies of the Jagiellonian University. From 1977 to 1980 and from 1982 to 1984 he worked at the Jagiellonian Library. Then he was the editor of Indeks and Wiadomości Tarnowskie. From 1984 to 1990 he was a tutor in the Emergency Care Service in Kraków. From 1987 to 1989 he edited the magazine Bez dekretu, and from 1988 to 1990 "Nowohucki Biuletyn Solidarności".

From 1976 he cooperated with the Workers' Defence Committee. With Bronisław Wildstein, he initiated the establishment of the Student Solidarity Committee in Kraków after the death of Stanisław Pyjas in 1977. From 1980, he collaborated with NSZZ "Solidarność". He wrote in underground magazines. During the martial law, he was interned from January to June 1982.

=== Cooperation with the Polish secret police ===
In his publications, he has repeatedly spoken critically about lustration. In 2001, he was revealed as a "secret collaborator" by his friend from the period of opposition activities, Bronisław Wildstein. On November 6, 2001, "Rzeczpospolita" published an open letter from the activists of the Krakow SKS, accusing Lesław Maleszka of collaborating with the Security Service of the People's Republic of Poland. In response, on November 7, the deputy editor-in-chief of "Tygodnik Powszechny" and former Minister of Internal Affairs, Krzysztof Kozłowski, accused SKS activists of unreliability and undermined the credibility of the SB materials. On the same day, Lesław Maleszka admitted that he was a secret collaborator nicknamed "Ketman". On November 13, Gazeta Wyborcza published his text entitled "I was a Ketman".

According to the Institute of National Remembrance, Lesław Maleszka's cooperation was much more extensive and voluntary than he himself admitted. Lesław Maleszka collaborated under several pseudonyms, independently suggesting to the Security Service to adopt a stricter policy towards opposition activists. He even reported to higher-ranking SB functionaries about case officers who did not implement his suggestions. Thanks to the help of the SB, he got a job at the Jagiellonian Library and was allocated an apartment in the Azory neighbourhood in Kraków. He received regular sums from the SB for denunciations. He was among the best-paid agents in Poland.
