= Leon Kieres =

Polish lawyer and politician

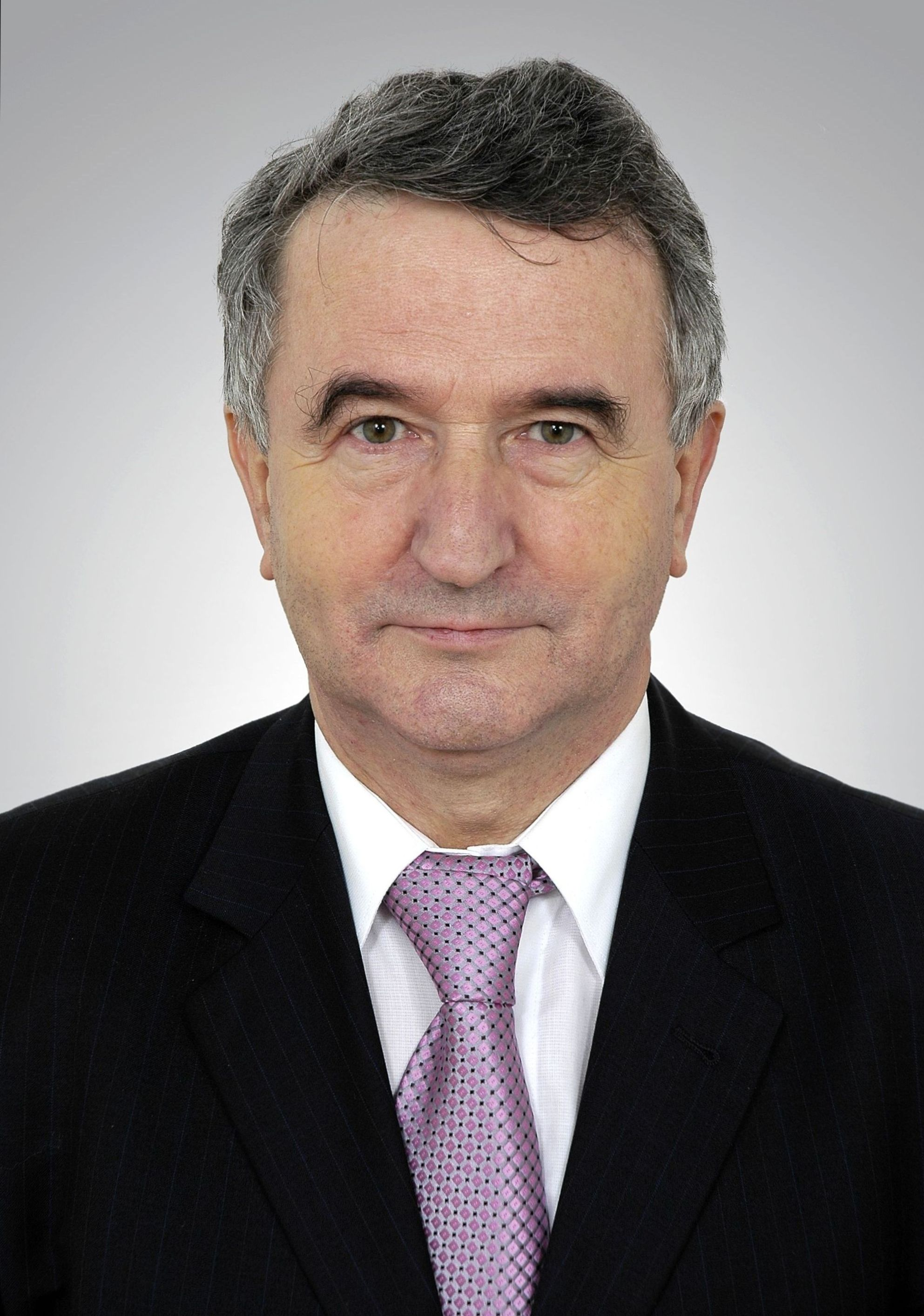
Leon Kieres (2010)

Leon Kieres (born 26 May 1948) is a Polish lawyer and politician. He was the president of the Instytut Pamięci Narodowej (Institute of National Remembrance) (8 June 2000 – 22 December 2005), a judge of the Polish Constitutional Tribunal.

== Biography ==
Leon Kieres was born on 26 May 1948 in Zielona, Poland. He graduated from the University of Wrocław, with a degree in law. Since 1971, he has served as an academic teacher at the Department of Law and Administration at the University of Wrocław. He defended his doctoral thesis in 1976 and completed the habilitation process in 1985. In 1991, he was awarded a professorship and since 1996, he has held the title of professor appointed by the President of the Republic of Poland.

In the 2006 local election, he ran for the Lower Silesian Regional Assembly. Polling 26,490 votes in District 2 as a candidate on the Civic Platform list, he was elected and subsequently chosen as the chairperson of the assembly. Upon being elected to the Senate of the Republic of Poland, he resigned from the assembly; his seat was filled by Jacek Pilawa, and Jerzy Pokój was elected as the new chairperson.

On 21 October 2007, during the parliamentary election, he was elected to the Senate of the Republic of Poland. He received 259,453 votes in District 3 of Wrocław as a candidate on the Civic Platform list. He has been a member of Senate VII Term since 5 November 2007.

== Sources ==
- Profile at Nauka Polska portal

Preceded by -	President of the Institute of National Remembrance; 2000–2005	Succeeded by Janusz Kurtyka
