= Łukasz Kamiński =

Polish historian

Dr Łukasz Kamiński
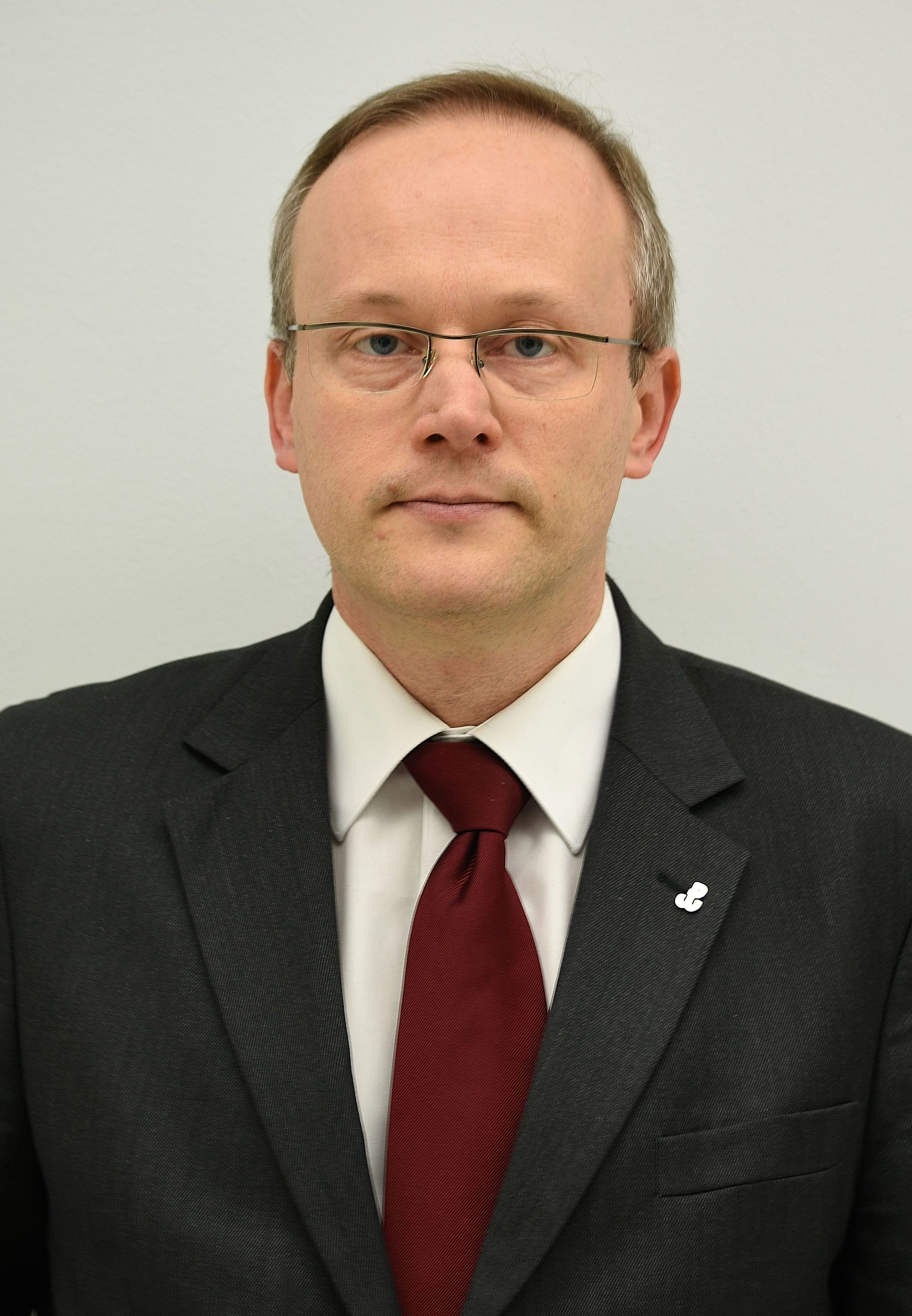

President of the Platform of European Memory and Conscience
- Incumbent
- Assumed office 2016
- Preceded by: Göran Lindblad

President of the Institute of National Remembrance
- In office 28 June 2011 – 2016
- Preceded by: Janusz Kurtyka (Franciszek Gryciuk acting 2010–2011)

Personal details
- Born: Łukasz Andrzej Kamiński; 3 June 1973 (age 53) Wrocław, Poland
- Profession: Historian

Łukasz Andrzej Kamiński (born 3 June 1973) is a Polish historian, specializing in the history of Poland after 1945, particularly the period of Soviet occupation and the Polish People's Republic. He is the President of the European Union's Platform of European Memory and Conscience and formerly served as President of the Institute of National Remembrance (IPN) from 2011 to 2016.

Kamiński earned his doctorate in 1999, and became deputy director of the IPN Bureau of Public Education in 2006, becoming director of the Bureau of Public Education in 2009. After his predecessor Janusz Kurtyka died in the 2010 Polish Air Force Tu-154 crash, Kamiński was elected by the Sejm as the third President of the IPN (Franciszek Gryciuk was acting president 2010–2011).

He is a founding signatory of the Prague Declaration on European Conscience and Communism.

== Recognitions ==
- Order of Polonia Restituta

== Publications ==
- Młodzież w oporze społecznym 1945–1989, Wrocław 1996, ISBN 83-89078-10-4
- Strajki robotnicze w Polsce w latach 1945–1948, Wrocław 1999, ISBN 83-910542-3-3
- Młodzież w oporze społecznym 1944–1989, IPN, Warsaw 2002, ISBN 83-88178-07-5
- Biuletyny dzienne Ministerstwa Bezpieczeństwa Publicznego 1949–1950, IPN, Warszawa 2004, ISBN 83-89078-51-1
- Polacy wobec nowej rzeczywistości 1944–1948. Formy pozainstytucjonalnego, żywiołowego oporu społecznego, 2004, ISBN 83-7174-419-6
- Wokół praskiej wiosny. Polska i Czechosłowacja w 1968 roku, IPN, Warsaw 2004, ISBN 83-89078-69-4
- Opór społeczny w Europie Środkowej w latach 1948–1953 na przykładzie Polski, NRD i Czechosłowacji (co-author), Wrocław 2004, ISBN 83-89247-95-X
- A handbook of the communist security apparatus in East Central Europe 1944–1989 (ed.), Institute of National Remembrance, Warsaw, 2005, ISBN 83-89078-82-1
- Wokół pogromu kieleckiego (ed.), IPN, Warsaw 2006, ISBN 83-60464-07-3
- Drogi do wolności Zagłębia Miedziowego (ed.), Legnica 2007, ISBN 83-88214-66-7
