= Institute of National Remembrance =

Polish government-affiliated institute

Institute of National Remembrance Instytut Pamięci Narodowej
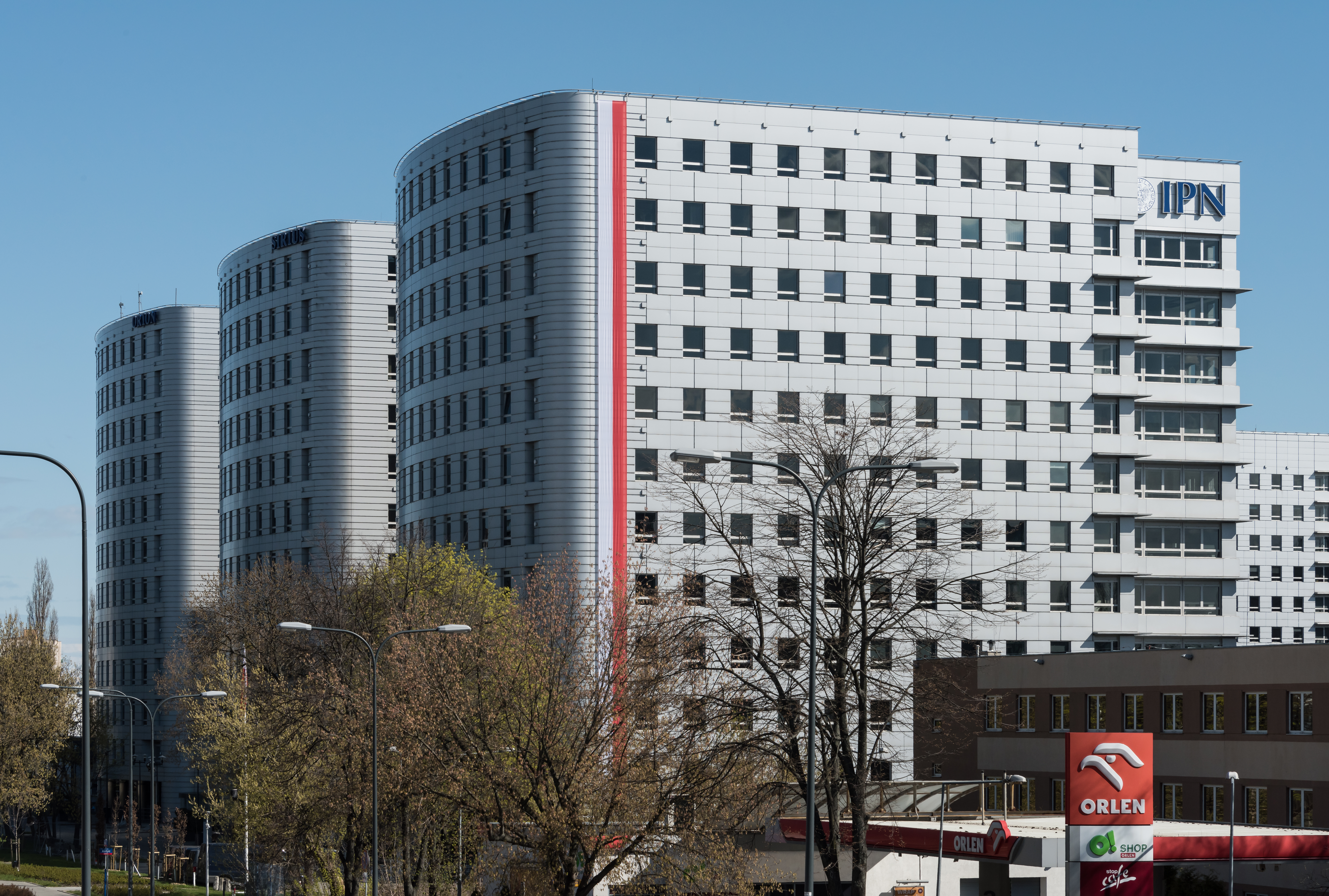
- The logo of IPN IPN headquarters at 1 Kurtyki Street in Warsaw
- Abbreviation: IPN
- Formation: 18 December 1998 (27 years ago)
- Purpose: Education, research, archive, and identification. Commemorating the Struggle and Martyrdom. Prosecution of Crimes against the Polish Nation.
- Headquarters: Warsaw, Poland
- Location: 1 Kurtyki Street
- Region served: Republic of Poland
- Members: Staff
- Official language: Polish
- President: TBD
- Main organ: Council
- Affiliations: Platform of European Memory and Conscience; Woodrow Wilson International Center for Scholars in Washington, D.C., partner institutions in Czech Republic, Germany, Slovakia, Hungary
- Staff: Several hundred
- Website: www.ipn.gov.pl
- Remarks: The IPN Headquarters in Warsaw co-ordinates the operations of eleven Branch Offices and their Delegations

The Institute of National Remembrance – Commission for the Prosecution of Crimes against the Polish Nation (Polish: Instytut Pamięci Narodowej – Komisja Ścigania Zbrodni przeciwko Narodowi Polskiemu, abbreviated IPN) is a Polish state research institute in charge of education and archives which also includes two public prosecution service components exercising investigative, prosecution and lustration powers. The IPN was established by the Polish parliament by the Act on the Institute of National Remembrance of 18 December 1998 through reforming and expanding the earlier Main Commission for the Investigation of Crimes against the Polish Nation of 1991, which itself had replaced the General Commission for Research on Fascist Crimes, a body established in 1945 focused on investigating the crimes of the Nazi administration in Poland during World War II.

In 2018, IPN's mission statement was amended by the controversial Amendment to the Act on the Institute of National Remembrance to include "protecting the reputation of the Republic of Poland and the Polish Nation". The IPN investigates and prosecutes Nazi and Communist crimes committed between 1917 and 1990, documents its findings, and disseminates them to the public. Some scholars have criticized the IPN for politicization, especially under Law and Justice governments.

The IPN began its activities on 1 July 2000. The IPN is a founding member of the Platform of European Memory and Conscience. Since 2020, the IPN headquarters have been located at Postępu 18 Street in Warsaw. The IPN has eleven branches in other cities and seven delegation offices.

== Purpose ==
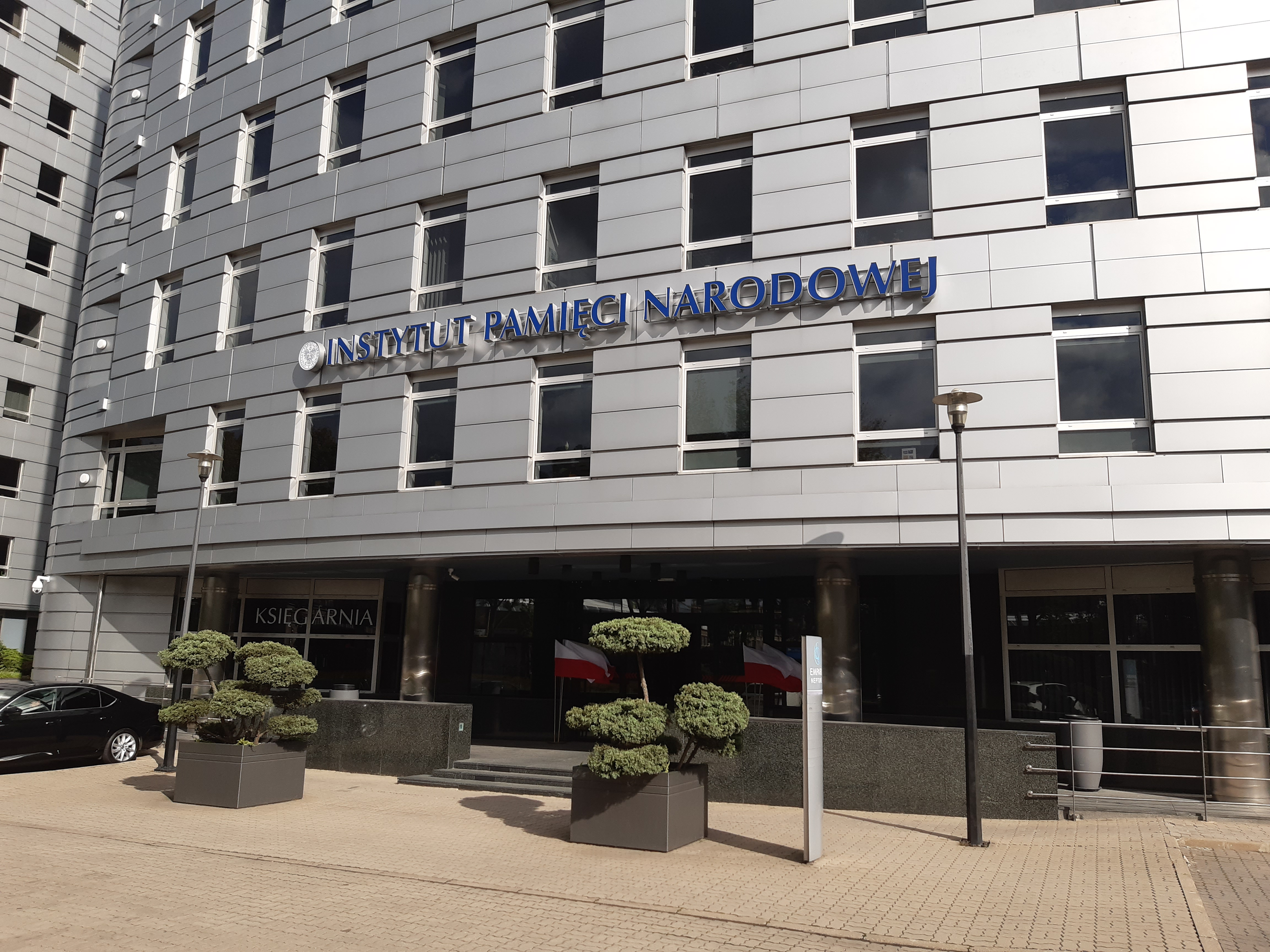
Main entrance

The IPN's main areas of activity, in line with its original mission statement, include researching and documenting the losses which were suffered by the Polish Nation as a result of World War II and during the post-war totalitarian period. The IPN informs about the patriotic traditions of resistance against the occupational forces, and the Polish citizens' fight for sovereignty of the nation, including their efforts in defence of freedom and human dignity in general.

According to the IPN, it is its duty to prosecute crimes against peace and humanity, as much as war crimes. Its mission includes the need to compensate for damages which were suffered by the repressed and harmed people at a time when human rights were disobeyed by the state, and educate the public about recent history of Poland. IPN collects, organises and archives all documents about the Polish Communist security apparatus active from 22 July 1944 to 31 December 1989.

Following the election of the Law and Justice party, the government formulated in 2016 a new IPN law. The 2016 law stipulated that the IPN should oppose publications of false information that dishonors or harms the Polish nation. It also called for popularizing history as part of "an element of patriotic education". The new law also removed the influence of academia and the judiciary on the IPN.

A 2018 amendment to the law, added article 55a that attempts to defend the "good name" of Poland. Initially conceived as a criminal offense (3 years of jail) with an exemption for arts and research, following an international outcry, the article was modified to a civil offense that may be tried in civil courts and the exemption was deleted. Defamation charges under the act may be made by the IPN as well as by accredited NGOs such as the Polish League Against Defamation. By the same law, the institution's mission statement was changed to include "protecting the reputation of the Republic of Poland and the Polish Nation".

== Organisation ==
IPN was created by special legislation on 18 December 1998. The IPN is divided into:

- Main Commission for the Prosecution of Crimes against the Polish Nation (Główna Komisja Ścigania Zbrodni Przeciwko Narodowi Polskiemu)
- Bureau of Provision and Archivization of Documents (Biuro Udostępniania i Archiwizacji Dokumentów)
- Bureau of Public Education (or Public Education Office, Biuro Edukacji Publicznej)
- Lustration Bureau (Biuro Lustracyjne) (new bureau, since October 2006)
- local chapters.

On 29 April 2010, acting president Bronislaw Komorowski signed into law a parliamentary act that reformed the Institute of National Remembrance.

=== Director ===
IPN is governed by the director, who has a sovereign position that is independent of the Polish state hierarchy. The director may not be dismissed during his term unless he commits a harmful act. Prior to 2016, the election of the director was a complex procedure, which involves the selection of a panel of candidates by the IPN Collegium (members appointed by the Polish Parliament and judiciary). The Polish Parliament (Sejm) then elects one of the candidates, with a required supermajority (60%). The director has a 5-year term of office. Following 2016 legislation in the PiS controlled parliament, the former pluralist Collegium was replaced with a nine-member Collegium composed of PiS supporters, and the Sejm appoints the director after consulting with the College without an election between candidates.

==== Leon Kieres ====
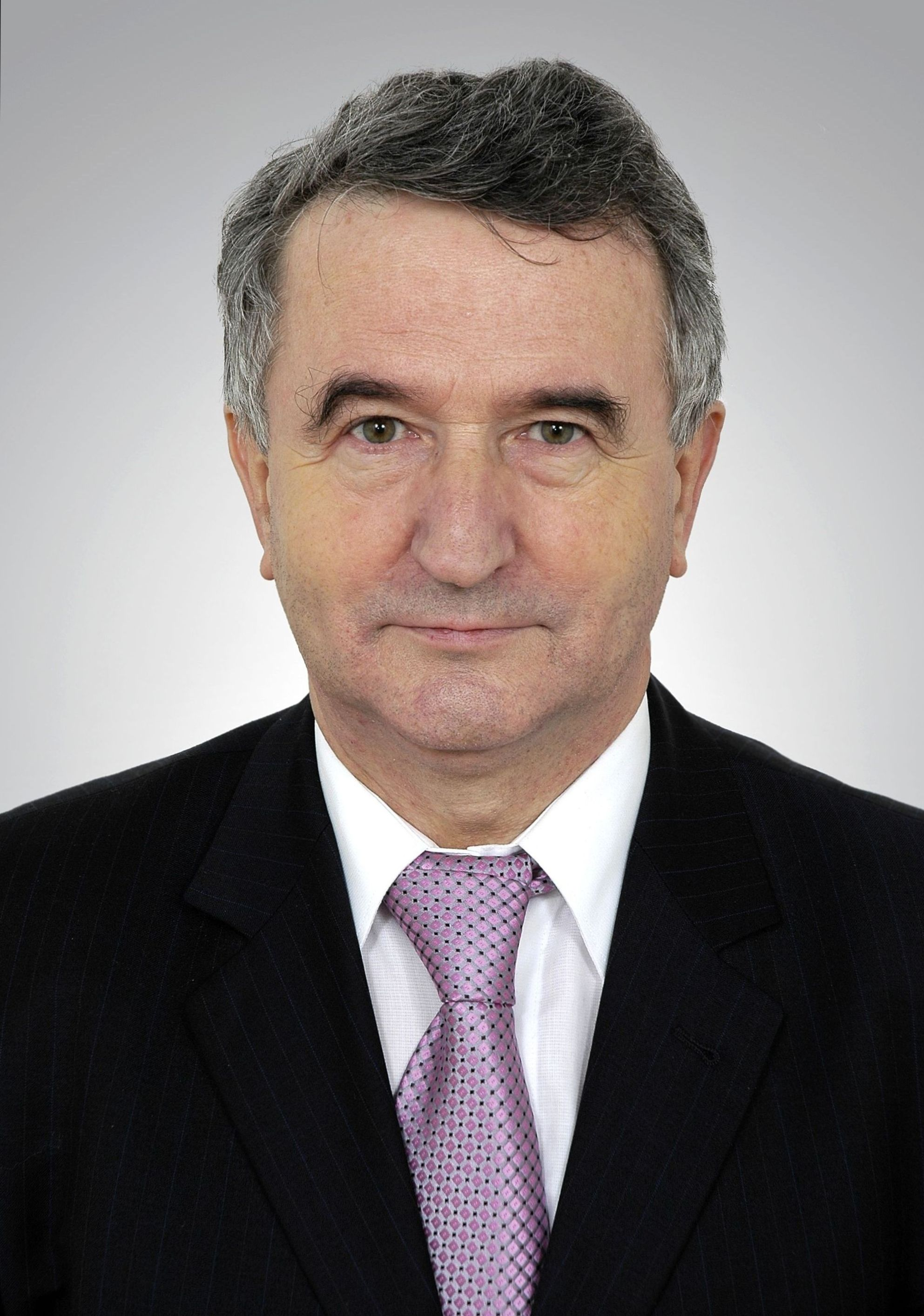
Leon Kieres

The first director of the IPN was Leon Kieres, elected by the Sejm for five years on 8 June 2000 (term 30 June 2000 – 29 December 2005). The IPN granted some 6,500 people the "victim of communism" status and gathered significant archive material. The IPN faced difficulties since it was new and also since the Democratic Left Alliance (containing former communists) attempted to close the IPN. The publication of Neighbors: The Destruction of the Jewish Community in Jedwabne, Poland by Jan T. Gross, proved to be a lifeline for the IPN as Polish president Aleksander Kwaśniewski intervened to save the IPN since he deemed the IPN's research to be important as part of Jewish-Polish reconciliation and "apology diplomacy".

==== Janusz Kurtyka ====
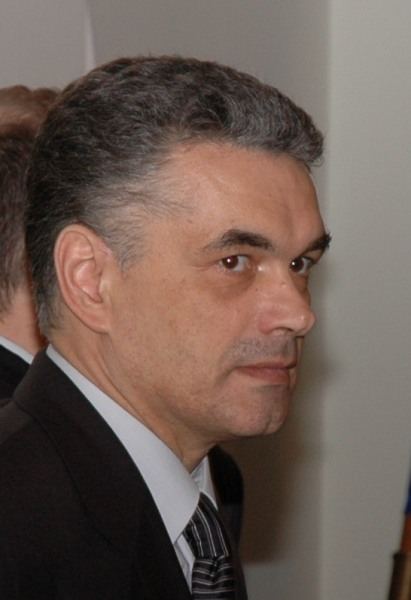
Janusz Kurtyka

The second director was Janusz Kurtyka, elected on 9 December 2005 with a term that started 29 December 2005 until his death in the Smolensk airplane crash on 10 April 2010. The elections were controversial, as during the elections a leak against Andrzej Przewoźnik accusing him of collaboration with Służba Bezpieczeństwa caused him to withdraw his candidacy. Przewoźnik was cleared of the accusations only after he had lost the election.

In 2006, the IPN opened a "Lustration Bureau" that increased the director's power. The bureau was assigned the task of examining the past of all candidates to public office. Kurtyka widened archive access to the public and shifted focus from compensating victims to researching collaboration.

Franciszek Gryciuk

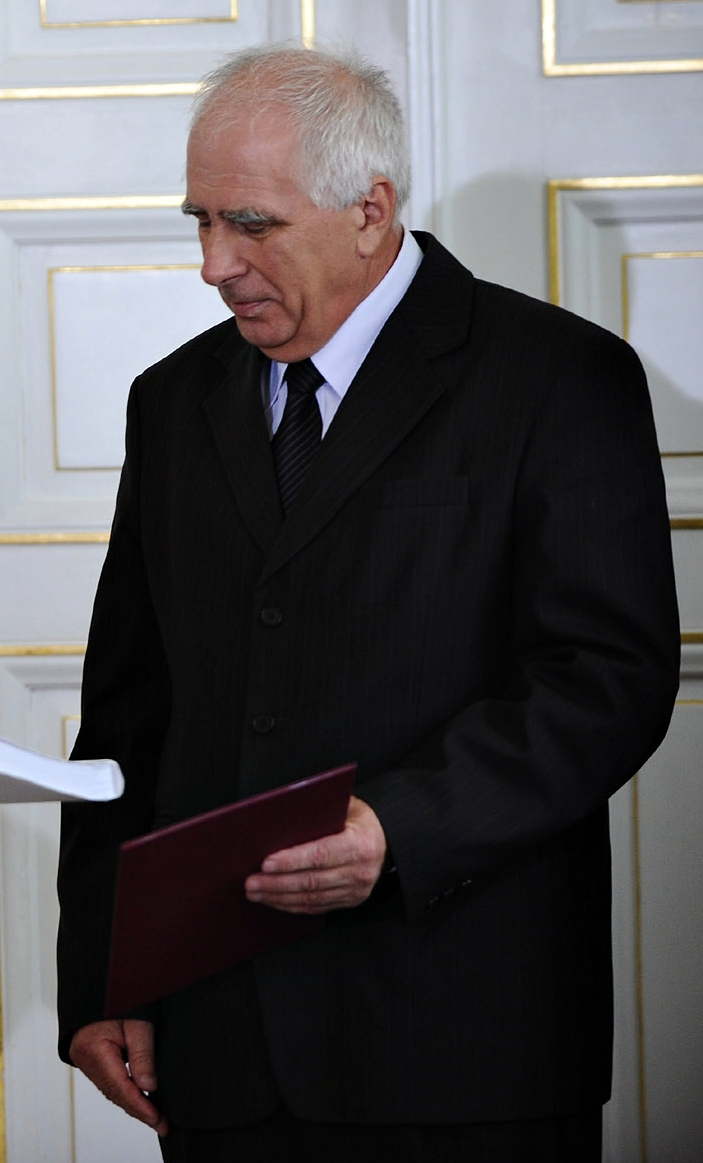
Franciszek Gryciuk

In 1999, historian Franciszek Gryciuk was appointed to the Collegium of the IPN, which he chaired 2003–2004. From June 2008 to June 2011, he was vice president of the IPN. He was acting director 2010–2011, between the death of the IPN's second president, Janusz Kurtyka, in the 2010 Polish Air Force Tu-154 crash and the election of Łukasz Kamiński by the Polish Parliament as the third director.

==== Łukasz Kamiński ====
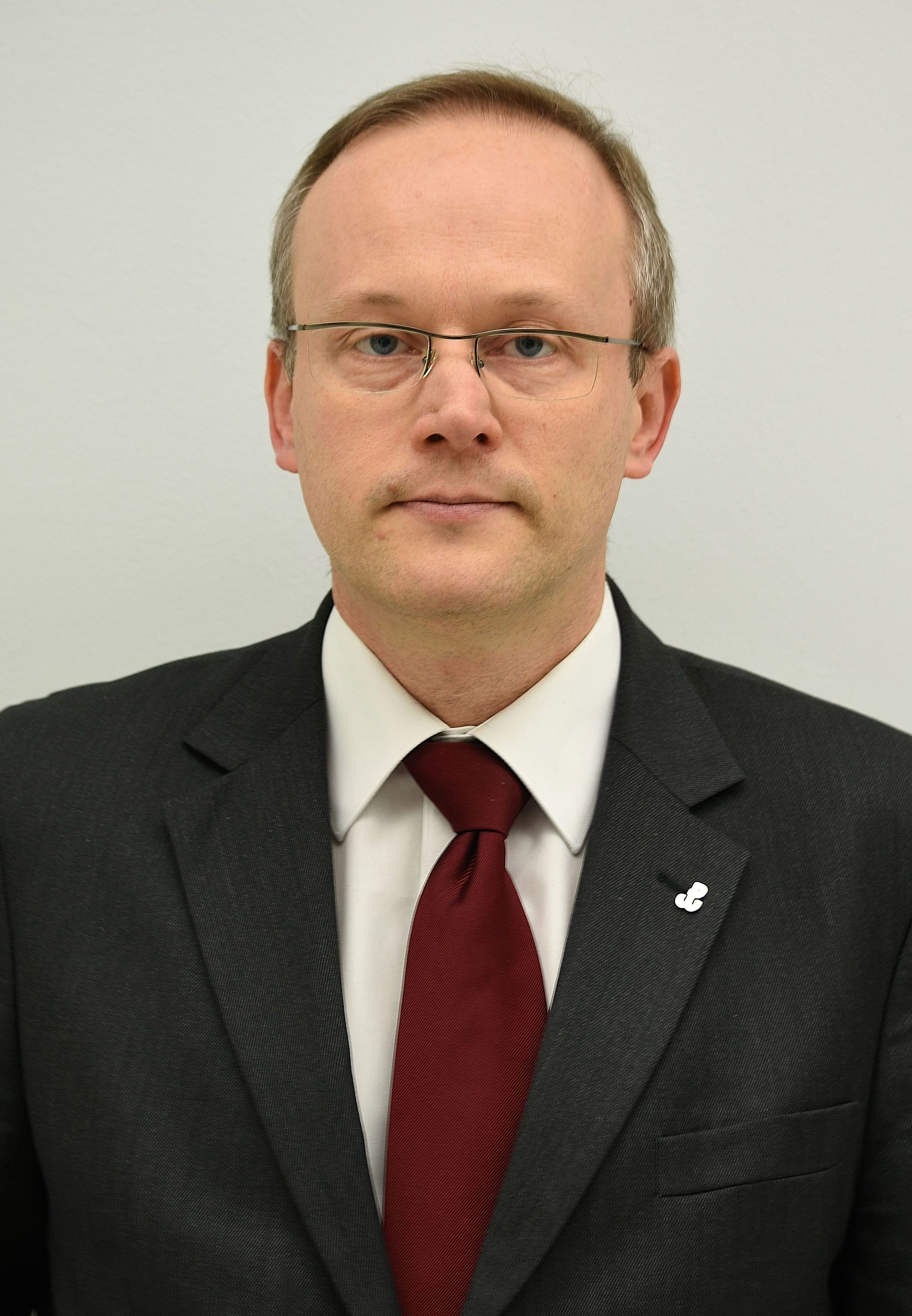
Łukasz Kamiński

Łukasz Kamiński, was elected by the Sejm in 2011 following the death of his predecessor. Kamiński headed the Wroclaw Regional Bureau of Public Education prior to his election. During his term, the IPN faced a wide array of criticism calling for an overhaul or even replacement. Critics founds fault in the IPN being a state institution, the lack of historical knowledge of its prosecutors, a relatively high number of microhistories with a debatable methodology, overuse of the martyrology motif, research methodology, and isolationism from the wider research community. In response, Kamiński implemented several changes, including organizing public debates with outside historians to counter the charge of isolationism and has suggested refocusing on victims as opposed to agents.

==== Jarosław Szarek ====
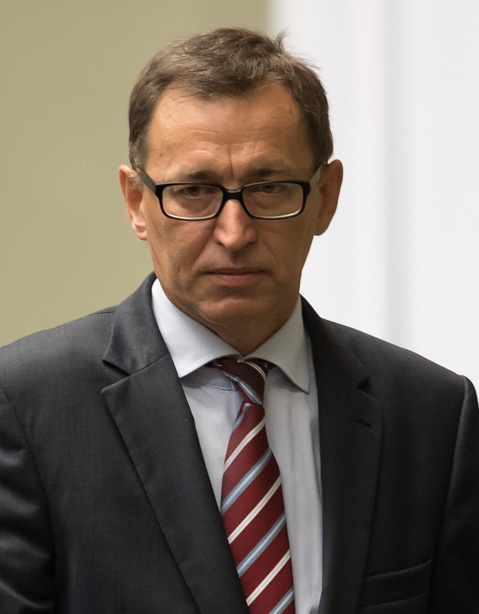
Jarosław Szarek

On 22 July 2016 Jarosław Szarek was appointed to head IPN. He dismissed Krzysztof Persak, co-author of the 2002 two-volume IPN study on the Jedwabne pogrom. In subsequent months, IPN featured in media headlines for releasing controversial documents, including some relating to Lech Wałęsa, for memory politics conducted in schools, for efforts to change Communist street names, and for legislation efforts. According to historian Idesbald Goddeeris, this marks a return of politics to the IPN.

==== Karol Nawrocki ====
On 23 July 2021 Karol Nawrocki was appointed as the head of IPN. Nawrocki would later become Polish President in 2025.

== Public prosecutors in the IPN ==
Two components of the IPN are specialized parts of the Public Prosecution Service of Poland, namely the Main Commission for the Prosecution of Crimes against the Polish Nation and the Lustration Bureau. Each of these two components exercises its activities autonomically from other components of the Institute and is headed by a director who is ex officio Deputy Public Prosecutor General of Poland, while role of the IPN Director is in their case purely accessory and includes no powers regarding conducted investigations, being limited only to providing supporting apparatus and, when vacated, presenting candidates for the offices of the two directors to the Prosecutor General who as their superior has the discretionary power to appoint or reject them.

=== Main Commission for the Prosecution of Crimes against the Polish Nation ===
The Main Commission for the Prosecution of Crimes against the Polish Nation (Główna Komisja Ścigania Zbrodni Przeciwko Narodowi Polskiemu) is the oldest component of the IPN tracing its origins to 1945. It investigates and prosecutes crimes committed on Polish soil against Polish citizens as well as people of other citizenships wronged in the country. War crimes which are not affected by statute of limitations according to Polish law include:

1. Crimes of the Soviet and Polish Communist regimes committed in the country from 17 September 1939 until the Fall of Communism on 31 December 1989.
2. Deportations to the Soviet Union of Polish soldiers of Armia Krajowa, and other Polish resistance organizations as well as Polish inhabitants of the former Polish eastern territories.
3. Pacifications of Polish communities between Vistula and Bug rivers in the years 1944 to 1947 by UB-NKVD,
4. Crimes committed by the law enforcement agencies of the Polish People's Republic, particularly Ministry of Public Security of Poland and Main Directorate of Information of the Polish Army.
5. Crimes under the category of war crimes and crimes against humanity.

=== Lustration Bureau ===
On 15 March 2007, an amendment to the Polish law regulating the IPN (enacted on 18 December 2006) came into effect. The change gave the IPN new lustration powers and expanded IPN's file access. The change was enacted by Law and Justice government in a series of legislative amendments during 2006 and the beginning of 2007. However, several articles of the 2006-7 amendments were held unconstitutional by Poland's Constitutional Court on 11 May 2007, though the IPN's lustration power was still wider than under the original 1997 law. These powers include loss of position for those who submitted false lustration declarations as well as a lustration process of candidates for senior office.

== Other activities ==
=== Research ===
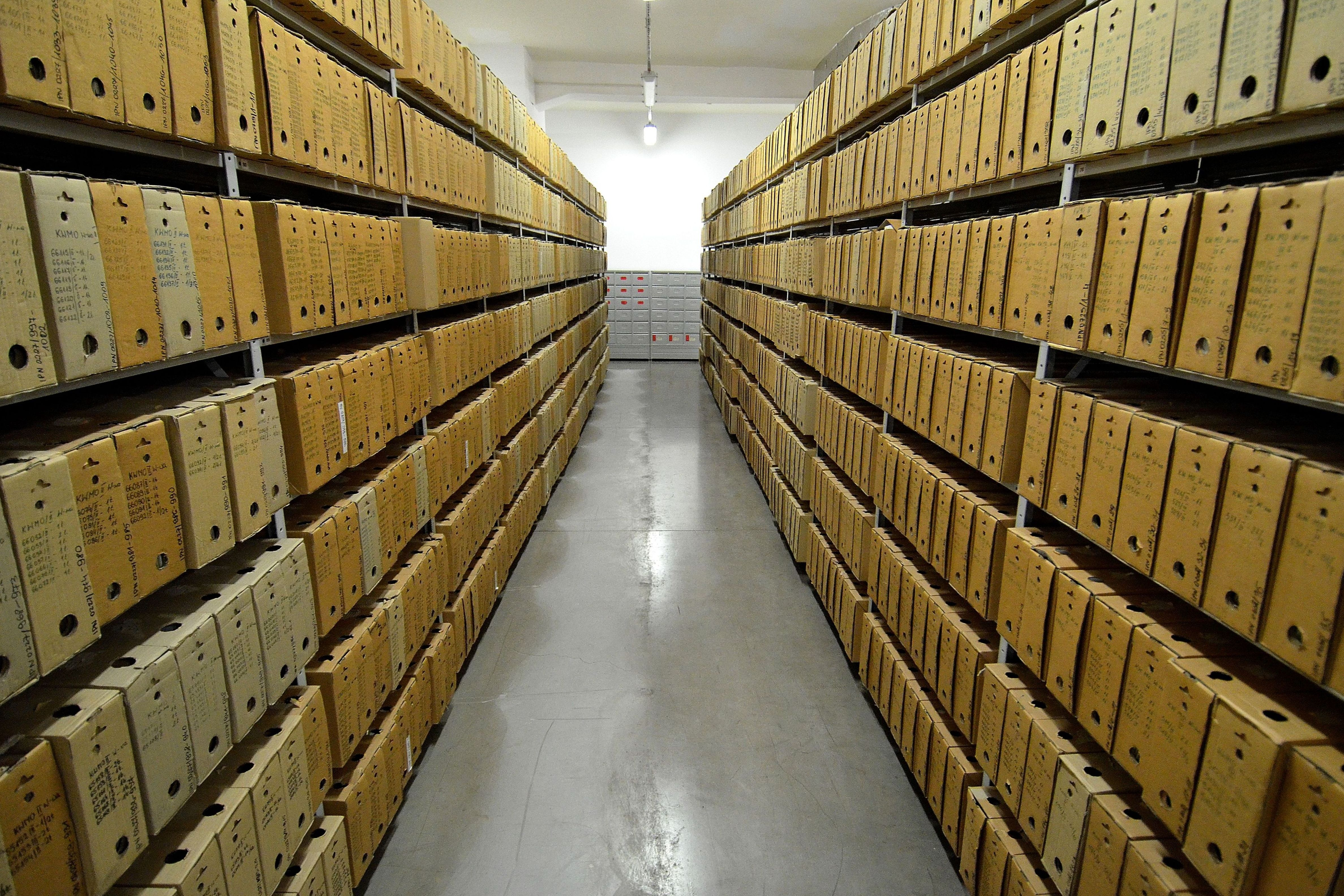
Archive at the former IPN headquarters at 28 Towarowa Street in Warsaw

The research conducted by IPN from December 2000 falls into four main topic areas:

- Security Apparatus and Civil Resistance (with separate sub-projects devoted to Political Processes and Prisoners 1944–1956, Soviet Repressions and Crimes committed against Polish Citizens and Martial Law: a Glance after Twenty Years);
  - Functioning of the repression apparatus (state security and justice organs) – its organizational structure, cadres and relations with other state authority and party organs
  - Activities of the repression apparatus directed against particular selected social groups and organizations
  - Structure and methods of functioning of the People's Poland security apparatus
  - Security apparatus in combat with the political and military underground 1944–1956
  - Activities of the security apparatus against political emigreés
  - Security apparatus in combat with the Church and freedom of belief
  - Authorities dealing with social crises and democratic opposition in the years 1956–1989 f) List of those repressed and sentenced to death
  - Bibliography of the conspiracy, resistance and repression 1944–1989
- War, Occupation and the Polish Underground;
  - deepening of knowledge about the structures and activities of the Polish Underground State
  - examination of the human fates in the territories occupied by the Soviet regime and of Poles displaced into the Soviet Union
  - assessment of sources on the living conditions under the Soviet and German Nazi occupations
  - evaluation of the state of research concerning the victims of the war activities and extermination policy of the Soviet and German Nazi occupiers
  - examining the Holocaust (Extermination of Jews) conducted by Nazis in the Polish territories
    - Response of the Polish Underground State to the extermination of Jewish population
    - The Polish Underground press and the Jewish question during the German Nazi occupation
- Poles and Other Nations in the Years 1939–1989 (with a part on Poles and Ukrainians);
  - Poles and Ukrainians
  - Poles and Lithuanians
  - Poles and Germans
  - Communist authorities – Belarusians – Underground
  - Fate of Jewish people in the People's Republic of Poland
  - Gypsies in Poland
- Peasants and the People's Authority 1944–1989 (on the situation of peasants and the rural policy in the years 1944–1989)
  - inhabitants of the rural areas during the creation of the totalitarian regime in Poland;
  - peasant life during the Sovietisation of Poland in the years 1948–1956;
  - attitudes of the inhabitants of rural areas towards the state-Church conflict in the years 1956–1970;
  - the role of peasants in the anti-Communist opposition of the 1970s and 1980s.

=== Education ===
The IPN's Public Education Office (BEP) vaguely defined role in the IPN act is to inform society of Communist and Nazi crimes and institutions. This vaguely defined role allowed Paweł Machcewicz, BEP's director in 2000, freedom to create a wide range of activities.

Researchers at the IPN conduct not only research but are required to take part in public outreach. BEP has published music CDs, DVDs, and serials. It has founded "historical clubs" for debates and lectures. It has also organized outdoor historical fairs, picnic, and games.

The IPN Bulletin (Polish: Biuletyn IPN) is a high circulation popular-scientific journal, intended for lay readers and youth. Some 12,000 of 15,000 copies of the Bulletin are distributed free of charge to secondary schools in Poland, and the rest are sold in bookstores. The Bulletin contains: popular-scientific and academic articles, polemics, manifestos, appeals to readers, promotional material on the IPN and BEP, denials and commentary on reports in the news, as well as multimedia supplements.

The IPN also publishes the Remembrance and Justice (Polish: Pamięć i Sprawiedliwość) scientific journal.

The IPN has issued several board games to help educate people about recent Polish history, including:

- 303 – a game about the Battle of Britain that focuses on the Polish 303 Squadron.
- Kolejka – a game about being forced to queue for basic household products during the Communist era.

=== Naming of monuments ===
In 2008, the chairman of the IPN wrote to local administrations, calling for the addition of the word "German" before "Nazi" to all monuments and tablets commemorating Germany's victims, stating that "Nazis" is not always understood to relate specifically to Germans. Several scenes of atrocities conducted by Germany were duly updated with commemorative plaques clearly indicating the nationality of the perpetrators. The IPN also requested better documentation and commemoration of crimes that had been perpetrated by the Soviet Union.

The Polish government also asked UNESCO to officially change the name "Auschwitz Concentration Camp" to "Former Nazi German Concentration Camp Auschwitz-Birkenau", to clarify that the camp had been built and operated by Nazi Germany. In 2007, UNESCO's World Heritage Committee changed the camp's name to "Auschwitz Birkenau German Nazi Concentration and Extermination Camp (1940–1945)." Previously some German media, including Der Spiegel, had called the camp "Polish".

=== Publications ===
Since 2019, the Institute publishes the Institute of National Remembrance Review (ISSN 2658-1566), a yearly peer-reviewed academic journal in English, with Anna Karolina Piekarska as editor-in-chief.

== Criticism ==
According to Georges Mink, common criticisms of the IPN include its dominance in the Polish research field, which is guaranteed by a budget that far supersedes that of any similar academic institution; the "thematic monotony ... of micro-historical studies ... of no real scientific interest" of its research; its focus on "martyrology"; and various criticisms of methodology and ethics. Some of these criticisms have been addressed by Director Łukasz Kamiński during his tenure and who according to Mink "has made significant changes"; however, Mink, writing in 2017, was also concerned with the recent administrative and personnel changes in IPN, including the election of Jarosław Szarek as director, which he posits are likely to result in further the politicization of the IPN. According to Valentin Behr, IPN research into the Communist era is valuable, positing that "the resources at its disposal have made it unrivalled as a research centre in the academic world"; at the same time, he said that the research is mostly focused on the era's negative aspects, and that it "is far from producing a critical approach to history, one that asks its own questions and is methodologically pluralistic." He added that in recent years that problem is being ameliorated as the IPN's work "has somewhat diversified as its administration has taken note of criticism on the part of academics."

According to Robert Traba, "under the ... IPN, tasks related to the 'national politics of memory' were – unfortunately – merged with the mission of independent academic research. In the public mind, there could be only one message flowing from the institute's name: memory and history as a science are one. The problem is that nothing could be further from the truth, and nothing could be more misleading. What the IPN's message presents, in fact, is the danger that Polish history will be grossly over-simplified." Traba states that "at the heart of debate today is a confrontation between those who support traditional methods and categories of research, and those who support newly defined methods and categories. ... Broadening the research perspective means the enrichment of the historian's instrumentarium.'" He puts the IPN research, in a broad sense, in the former; he states that "[a] solid, workshop-oriented, traditional, and positivist historiography ... which defends itself by the integrity of its analysis and its diversified source base" but criticizes its approach for leading to a "falsely conceived mission to find 'objective truth' at the expense of 'serious study of event history', and a 'simplified claim that only 'secret' sources, not accessible to ordinary mortals', can lead to that objective truth." Traba quotes historian Wiktoria Śliwowska, who wrote: "The historian must strive not only to reconstruct a given reality, but also to understand the background of events, the circumstances in which people acted. It is easy to condemn, but difficult to understand a complicated past. ... [Meanwhile, in the IPN] thick volumes are being produced, into which are being thrown, with no real consideration, further evidence in criminating various persons now deceased (and therefore not able to defend themselves), and elderly people still alive – known and unknown." Traba posits that "there is ... a need for genuine debate that does not revolve around [the files] in the IPN archives, 'lustration,' or short-term and politically inspired discussions designed to establish the 'only real' truth", and suggests that adopting varied perspectives and diverse methodologies might contribute to such debate.

During PiS's control of the government between 2005 and 2007, the IPN was the focus of heated public controversies, in particular in regard to the pasts of Solidarity leader Lech Wałęsa and PZPR secretary Wojciech Jaruzelski. As a result, the IPN has been referred to as "a political institution at the centre of 'memory games'".

In 2008, two IPN employees, Sławomir Cenckiewicz and Piotr Gontarczyk, published a book, SB a Lech Wałęsa (The Security Service and Lech Wałęsa: A Contribution to a Biography) which caused a major controversy. The book's premise was that in the 1970s the Solidarity leader and later president of Poland Lech Wałęsa was a secret informant of the Polish Communist Security Service.

In 2018, the IPN hired Tomasz Greniuch, a historian who in his youth was associated with a far-right group. When he was promoted to a regional director of the Wrocław branch in February 2021, his past came to media attention and resulted in criticism of Greniuch and IPN. Greniuch issued an apology for his past behavior and resigned within weeks.

=== Organizational and methodological concerns ===
Valentin Behr writes that the IPN is most "concerned with the production of an official narrative about Poland's recent past" and therefore lacks innovation in its research, while noting that situation is being remedied under recent leadership. He writes that the IPN "has mainly taken in historians from the fringes of the academic field" who were either unable to obtain a prominent academic position or ideologically drawn to the IPN's approach, and that "in the academic field, being an 'IPN historian' can be a stigma"; Behr explains this by pointing to a generational divide in Polish academia, visible when comparing IPN to other Polish research outlets, and claims: "Hiring young historians was done deliberately to give the IPN greater autonomy from the academic world, considered as too leftist to describe the dark sides of the communist regime." He says that the IPN has created opportunities for many history specialists who can carry dedicated research there without the need for an appointment at another institution, and for training young historians, noting that "the IPN is now the leading employer of young PhD students and PhDs in history specialized in contemporary history, ahead of Polish universities".

Historian Dariusz Stola states that the IPN is very bureaucratic in nature, comparing it to a "regular continental European bureaucracy, with usual deficiencies of its kind", and posits that in this aspect the IPN resembles the former Communist institutions it is supposed to deal with, equally "bureaucratic, centralist, heavy, inclined to extensive growth and quantity rather than quality of production".

An incident which caused controversy involved the "Wildstein list", a partial list of persons who allegedly worked for the communist-era Polish intelligence service, copied in 2004 from IPN archives (without IPN permission) by journalist Bronisław Wildstein and published on the Internet in 2005. The list gained much attention in Polish media and politics, and IPN security procedures and handling of the matter came under criticism.

== See also ==
- Laws against Holocaust denial
- Office for War Veterans and Victims of Oppression
- Ukrainian Institute of National Memory
