= Franciszek Gryciuk =

Polish historian

Dr Franciszek Gryciuk
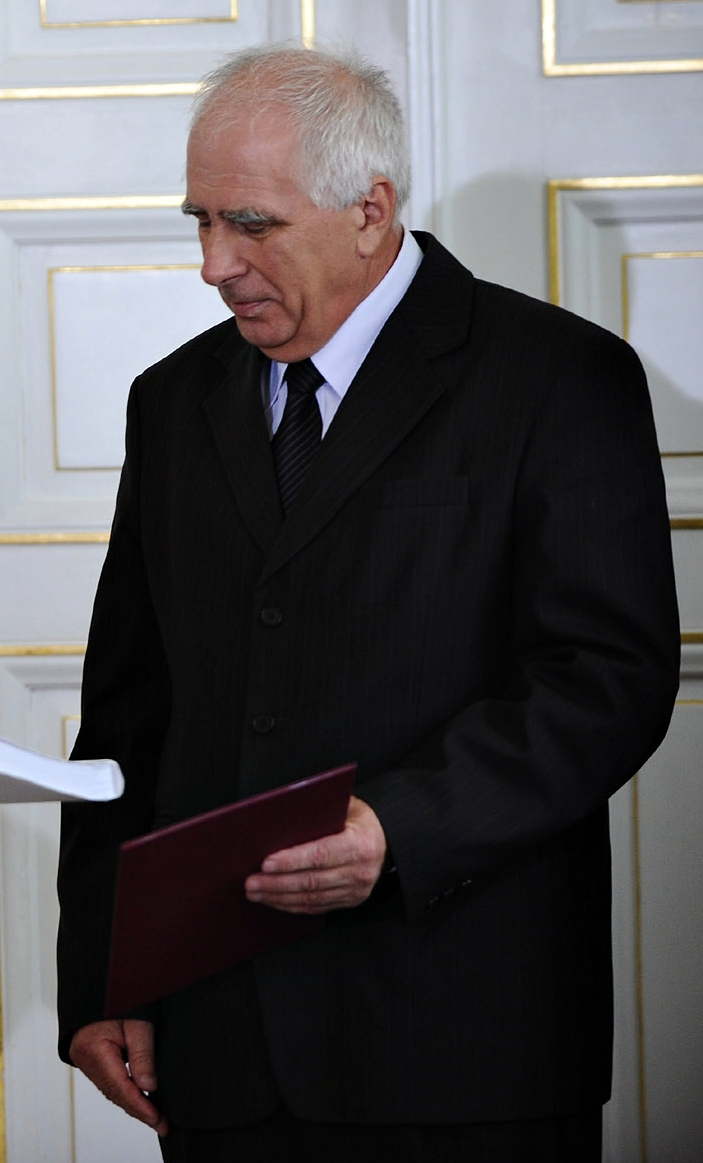
- Franciszek Gryciuk (2010)

Acting President of the Institute of National Remembrance
- In office 2010–2011
- Preceded by: Janusz Kurtyka
- Succeeded by: Łukasz Kamiński

Personal details
- Born: 1948 (age 77–78)
- Profession: Historian

Franciszek Gryciuk (born 1948 in Kobylany) is a Polish historian. He has served as Vice President and Acting President of the Institute of National Remembrance (IPN).

He holds a doctorate in history from the University of Warsaw, and works at the University of Natural Sciences and Humanities in Siedlce. In the 1990s, he was dean of the Faculty of Humanities, and from 1996 to 1999, vice-rector of its predecessor. In 1999, he was appointed to the Collegium of the IPN, which he chaired 2003–2004. From June 2008 to June 2011 he was Vice President of the IPN. He was Acting President 2010–2011, between the death of the IPN's second President Janusz Kurtyka in the 2010 Polish Air Force Tu-154 crash and the election of Łukasz Kamiński by the Sejm as the third President.
