= Wildstein list =

List of people associated with the Polish intelligence services

The Wildstein List is a list which contains the names of some 162,617 (originally thought to contain 240,000) individuals who are believed to either have worked for the Polish Służba Bezpieczeństwa (secret intelligence service of the socialist era), or who SB considered recruiting (with or without their knowledge), or who were under investigation by SB. It is named after the reporter who supposedly secretly copied the list from the national archives, Bronisław Wildstein. The list eventually found its way to the Internet. At least one Polish official has confirmed (Marek Dukaczewski in Monika Olejnik's program) which is believed to contain the names of at some current agents working abroad.

The list contains names from archives of former (communist) Polish political police, military intelligence and other secret agencies. This list could contain former workers of those agencies and their secret agents (confidants), but also there are names of people that secret police wanted to make confidants but never succeeded. It is not clear how this list leaked from the IPN (Institute of National Remembrance), but it is commonly assumed that it was Bronisław Wildstein who copied that list to his pendrive and then made it available for journalists.
