= Wiktoria Śliwowska =

Polish historian and author (1931–2021)

Wiktoria Śliwowska (26 June 1931 – 27 December 2021) was a Polish historian, author and employee of the Institute of History of the Polish Academy of Sciences, specializing in the Polish-Russian relations. She published books on Russian Literature and history, as well as Polish history.

== Biography ==
Wiktoria Śliwowska was born in a Jewish family, the daughter of Józef Lewin-Łaski (known after World War II as Wacław Zawadzki) and Sara née Fryszman. During World War II she was imprisoned in the Warsaw Ghetto in which Sara died.

From 1949 to 1953, Śliwowska studied at the Polish Pedagogical Institute of Alexander Hercena in Leningrad, where she met her future husband René Śliwowski. In 1953 she started working at the Institute of History in Poland, where in 1960 she defended her doctoral thesis, and in 1971 she was habilitated. In 1994 Śliwowska received the title professor of humanities.

Śliwowska was the author and editor of many works on the history of Russia, including the era of Nicholas I and the history of Polish deportees in Russia. Together with Rene, she published books on Russian literature. She participated on the team which, under Stefan Kieniewicz, prepared for printing a multi-volume edition of documents on the January Uprising. In 2008, she and Rene published Memories of Russia - Our love.

In 2003 Śliwowska was awarded the Officer's Cross of the Order of Polonia Restituta. In 1999 and 2005, she received the Klio Award, in 2000, the Special Review of the Eastern Review, in 2001, Śliwowska was awarded the title of Doctor Honoris Causa of the Russian Academy of Sciences, and in 2019, the same distinction of the Jan Kochanowski University in Kielce.

Śliwowska died on 27 December 2021, at the age of 90.
