= Stanisław Pyjas =

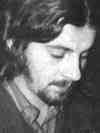
- Born: 4 August 1953; Gilowice
- Died: 7 May 1977 (aged 23); Kraków
- Cause of death: murder
- Known for: member of the anticommunist student movements

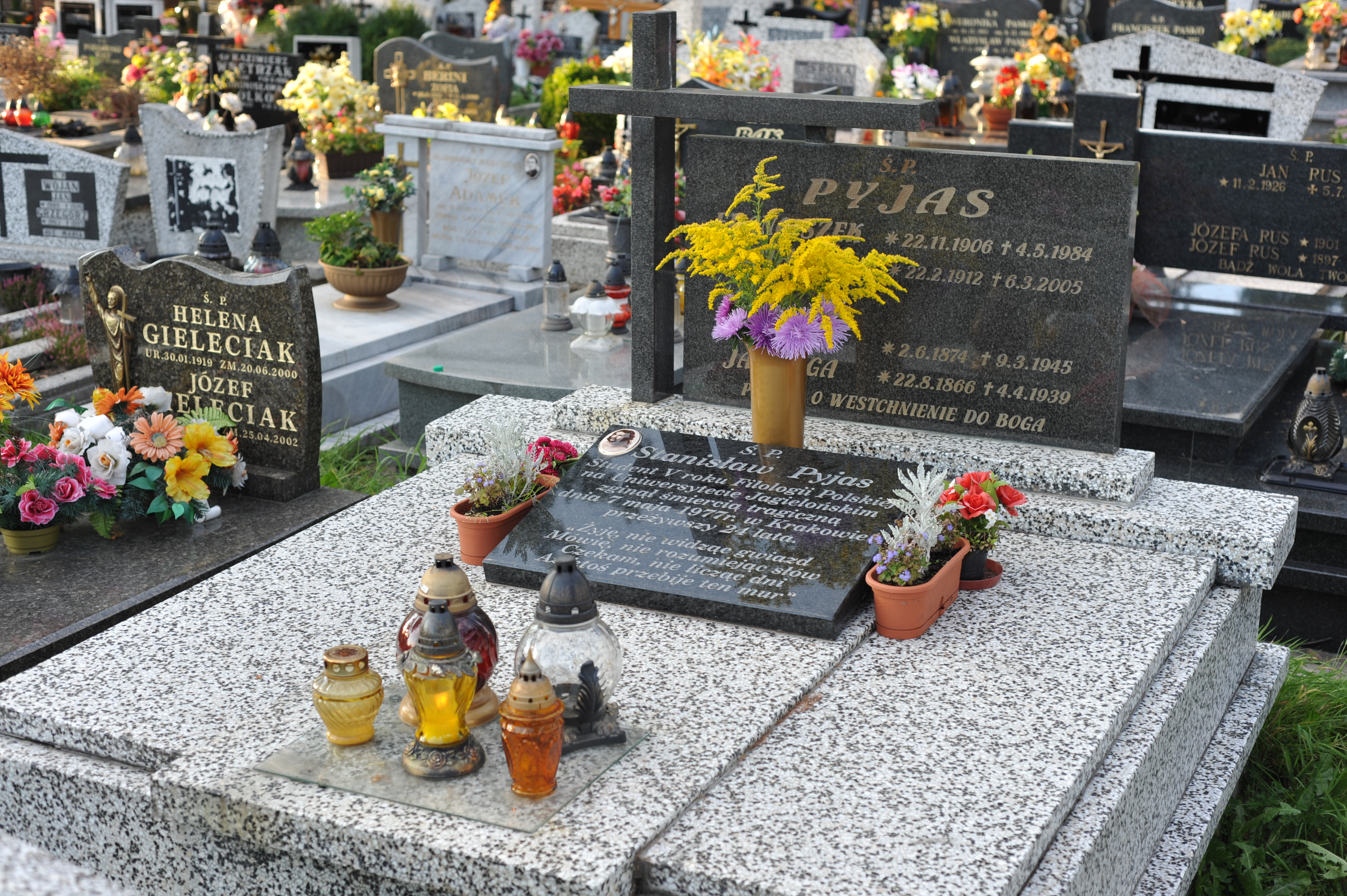
Stanisław Pyjas's grave on a cemetery in Gilowice, Żywiec County

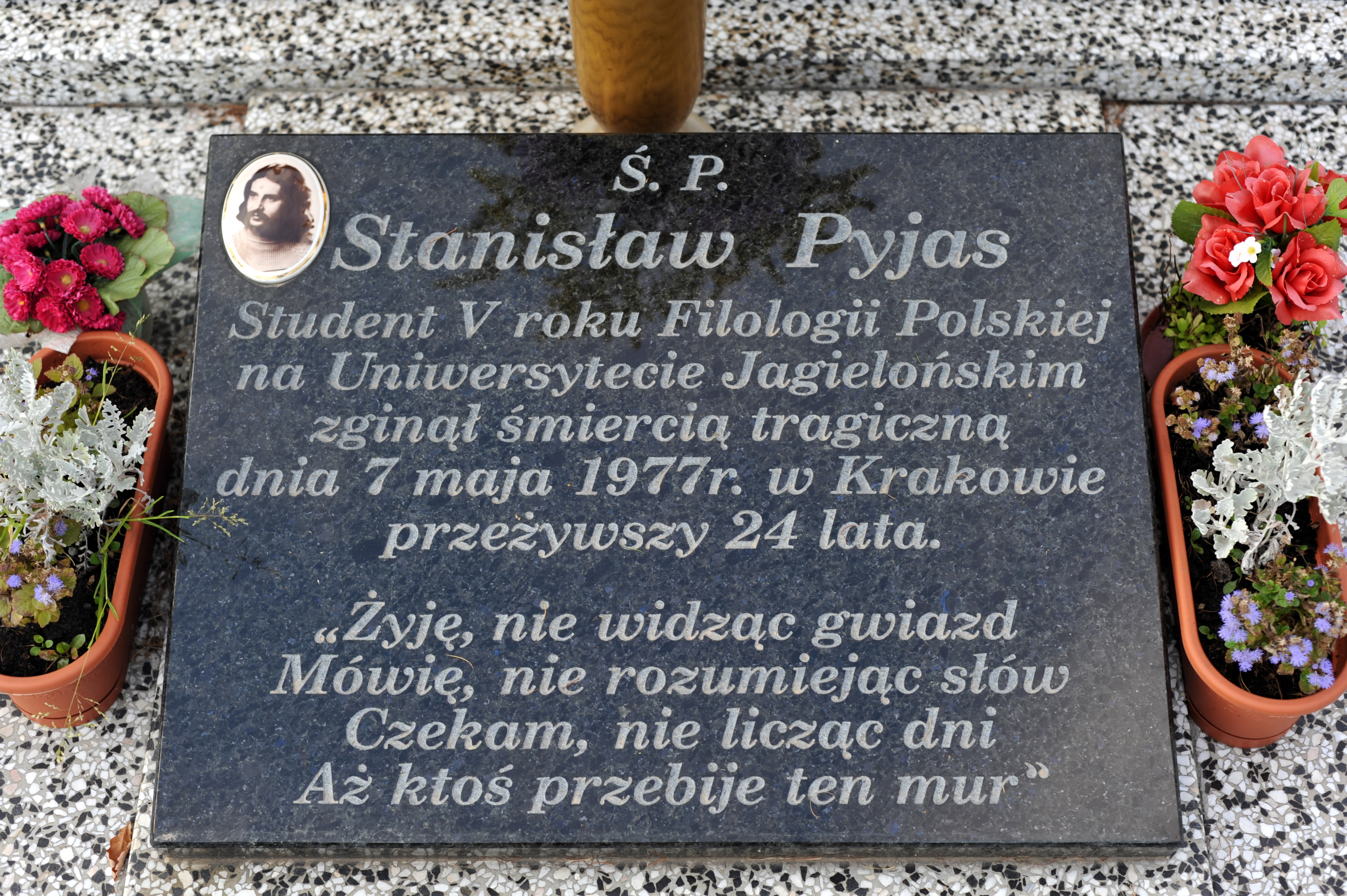
grave plaque

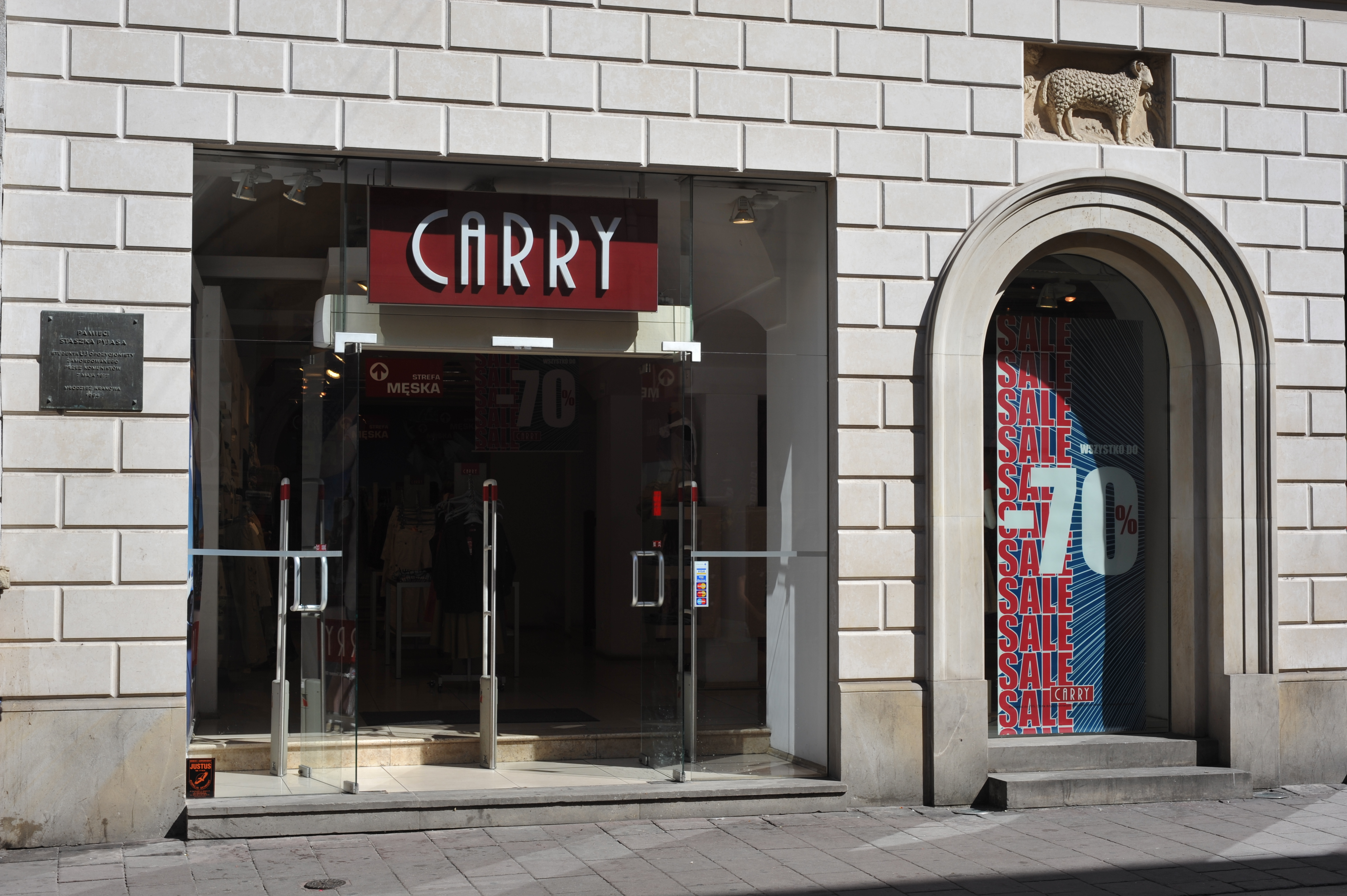
7 Szewska Street in Kraków, 2008

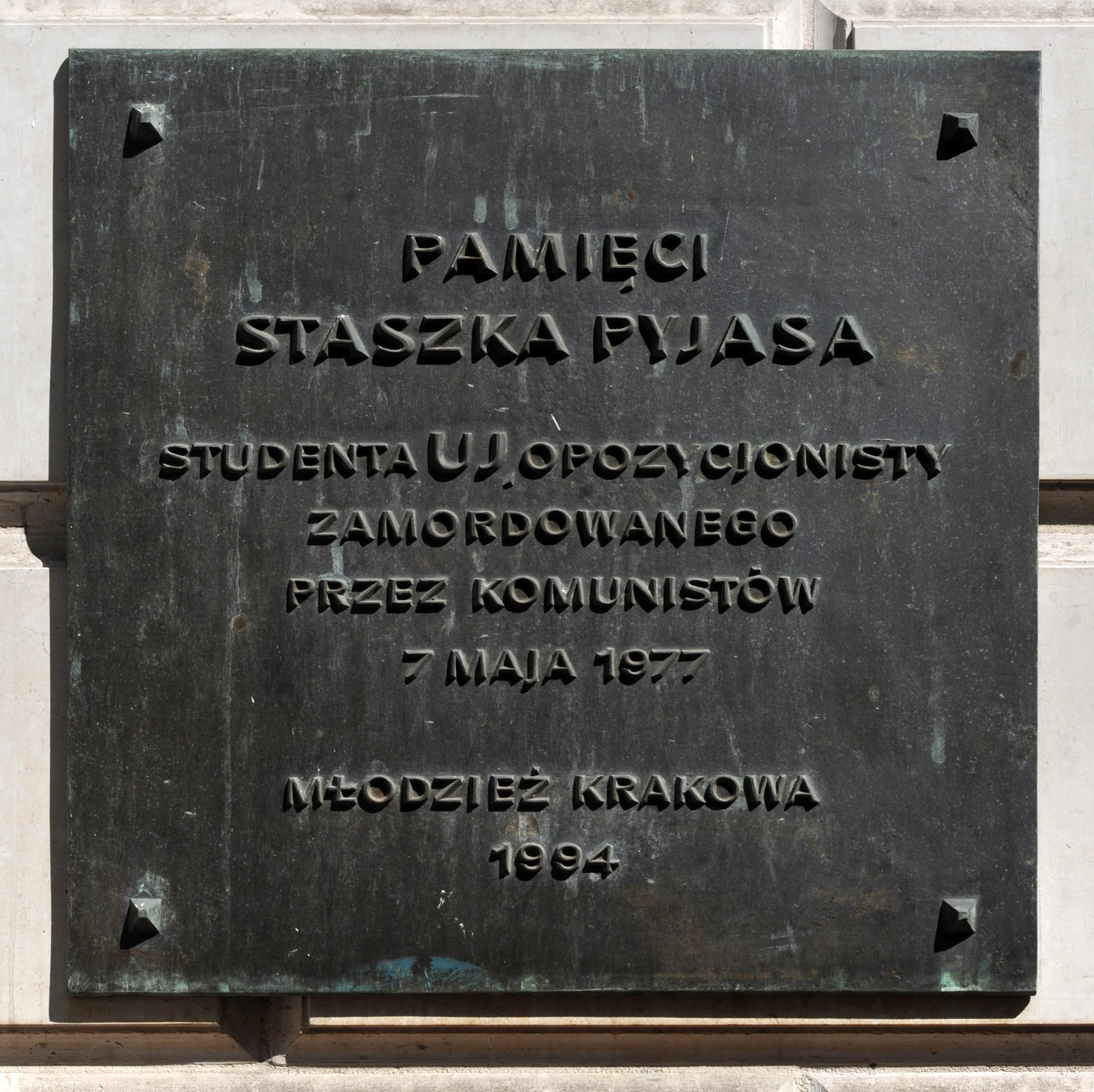
Stanisław Pyjas's memorial plaque at 7 Szewska Street in Kraków

Stanisław Włodzimierz Pyjas (1953–1977) was a Polish student of the Jagiellonian University in Kraków, member of the anticommunist student movements. He died on 7 May 1977, in Kraków. The exact circumstances of Pyjas’ death are still a mystery and his case, which is still disputed, shook public opinion in Poland. According to one scenario he was murdered and the killers, probably members of the communist Secret Services, arranged the death to look like an accident. The official scenario, however, states that his death occurred after he fell from the stairs while being drunk. In 2011 his body was examined, and the outcome states that it was the fall that caused his death and that he had not been beaten.

== Oppositional activities ==
Stanisław Pyjas was born on 4 August 1953, in Żywiec. After graduation from a local high school, he moved to Kraków, to begin studies at the renowned Jagiellonian University. He studied Polish philology and philosophy.

Some time in 1976 Pyjas joined the Workers' Defence Committee, the organisation which was created to help labourers, participants in the anticommunist street protests in Radom and Warsaw. Together with friends from the University, Bronisław Wildstein and Lesław Maleszka, Pyjas organised protests against repressions.

== Death ==
Pyjas’ body was found on 7 May 1977, in the staircase located in a building at 7 Szewska Street in Kraków’s historic centre. His death shook the student community, with around 1,000 people showing up at the funeral in the village of Gilowice. Street demonstrations, such as Kraków’s Black March, erupted in several Polish cities and soon afterwards, Polish students, shaken by the death of their colleague, founded the Student Committee of Solidarity. On 15 May 1977, after a Black March, the founders urged the Polish government to reveal who was behind the crime. Among members of the Committee was Donald Tusk, who later became prime minister of Poland, and then EU President. It was the first organization of this kind in Eastern Europe.

== Aftermath ==
The perpetrators of the crime have never been found. Three different investigations, carried out by the local prosecutor’s office and Milicja Obywatelska, stalled and finally ended, due to lack of evidence.

Officially, Kraków doctor Zdzisław Marek stated that Pyjas, drunk, fell down the stairs, but Pyjas’ friends did not believe it. Bronisław Wildstein stated that he bribed a worker at the mortuary in Kraków and entered the premises, to check the body of his fellow student. According to him, it was clear that Pyjas had been brutally beaten to death.

A few weeks after Pyjas’ death, the body of another student, Stanisław Pietraszka, was found in the Solina Lake. According to his brother, it must have been a murder, as Pietraszka was afraid of water. He was the last person to have seen Pyjas alive and he gave a description of the possible murderer. Also, a person suspected of murder, a boxer of Cracovia, Marian Weclewicz, died in a mysterious accident.

== The role of Lesław Maleszka ==
In late June 2008, private television TVN presented a documentary Trzech kumpli (Three mates), which presented the story of Wildstein, Pyjas and Lesław Maleszka (a.k.a. Ketman and Return). All three of them were friends in college, studied together and were active in anticommunist opposition. However, Maleszka, who afterwards worked for Gazeta Wyborcza, was a secret informer of Służba Bezpieczeństwa.

Maleszka was a highly praised agent, whose reports on students in Kraków, in which he did not hesitate to describe the intimate lives of his closest friends, were called excellent by his secret service bosses. According to Roman Graczyk, a journalist and Maleszka’s friend from university, Pyjas had to die, because he might have suspected Maleszka of collaboration. The secret services did not want to lose such a valuable agent and an unknown officer ordered the assassination.

On 23 September 2006, Pyjas was posthumously awarded the Commander's Cross of the Polonia Restituta, by president Lech Kaczyński. In 2019, he was awarded the Cross of Freedom and Solidarity.
