= Bronisław Wildstein =

Polish journalist (born 1952)

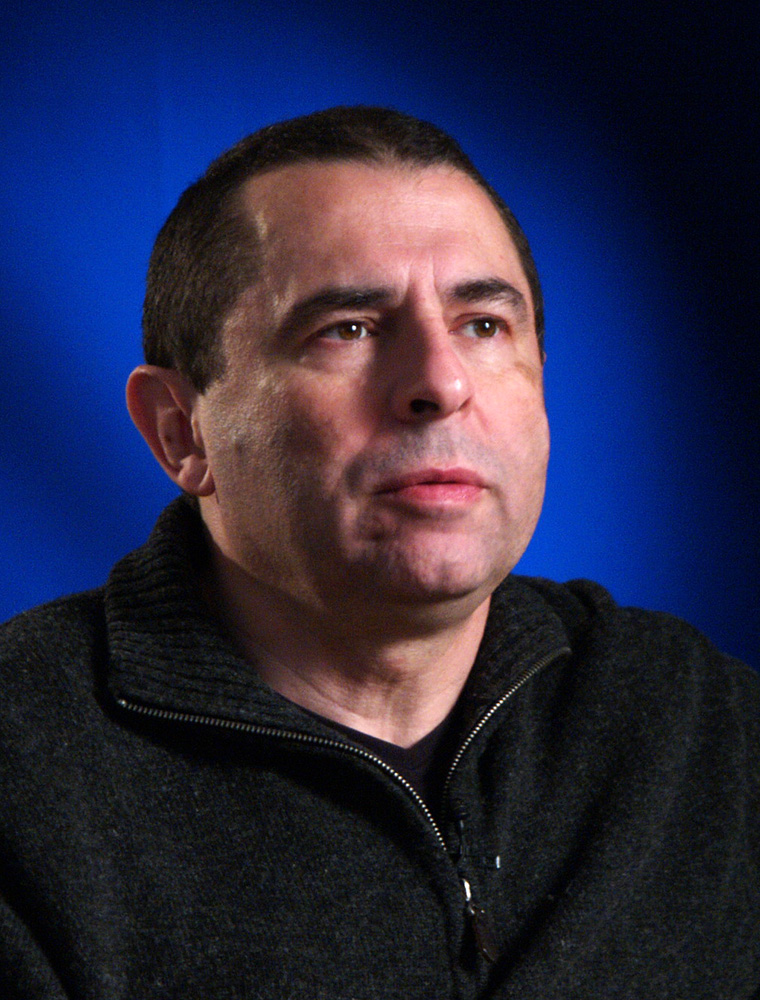
- Wildstein in 2008
- Born: June 11, 1952 (age 74); Olsztyn, Poland
- Education: Jagiellonian University
- Occupations: Journalist; writer; dissident; media executive
- Known for: Wildstein list; CEO of Telewizja Polska (2006-2007)
- Parents: Szymon Wildstein; Genowefa Wildstein

Bronisław Wildstein (born 11 June 1952) is a former Polish dissident, a journalist, freelance author, and, from 11 May 2006 to 28 February 2007, was the chief executive officer of Telewizja Polska (Polish state-owned television). Wildstein rose to nationwide prominence in Poland in January and February 2005, after he smuggled files on informers and victims of the former communist secret police (Służba Bezpieczeństwa) from the Institute of National Remembrance (IPN) and distributed them to fellow journalists. The files are commonly referred to as "Wildstein's list" (lista Wildsteina).

== Early life ==
Wildstein was born on 11 June 1952 in Olsztyn. His father Szymon Wildstein was a Jewish military doctor and communist in the Second Republic of Poland. His mother Genowefa Wildstein was an anticommunist peasant and member of the Home Army (the Polish underground army acting against Poland's World War II German and Soviet occupiers).

When he was five years old he contracted tuberculosis, and his family moved to Przemyśl for the healthier climate.

From 1971 through 1980, Wildstein studied Polish literature at the Jagiellonian University in Kraków. In the 1970s, he joined the oppositional Workers' Defence Committee (Komitet Obrony Robotnikow), an influential highbrow forerunner to the Solidarity movement that was established in 1980; and in 1977 he co-founded the Student Committee of Solidarity (Studencki Komitet Solidarności). From 1980 he lived in France, where he worked as a journalist for the Polish monthly Kontakt and for Radio Free Europe.

After the fall of communism, he returned to Poland. From 1994 until 1996, he worked for the Polish daily newspaper Życie Warszawy (Warsaw Life), before its transformation into the more conservative Życie (Life). Most recently, he was a salaried employee of the prestigious, moderately-conservative-to-centrist daily, Rzeczpospolita (The Republic), which dropped him as a salaried employee in the wake of the public controversy over "Wildstein's List" (though he continues to contribute as a freelance writer).

Currently Wildstein publishes essays for the weekly newsmagazine, Do Rzeczy.

== "Wildstein's List" controversy ==
=== Background ===
In his books and essays, Wildstein has strongly argued for a thorough review of the communist past not only of politicians, but of all of Polish society. However, a comprehensive vetting of public figures regarding contacts with the oppressive former communist apparatus has, after delays, been carried out only to a limited extent and with rather inconsequential results.

Ever since the fall of communism, the question of vetting (lustracja) has been a bone of contention among political camps that emerged from the former anticommunist opposition. One side – prominently represented by Adam Michnik and his Gazeta Wyborcza, the country's largest daily – calls for a comprehensive reconciliation between former operatives and opponents of the Polish People's Republic by symbolically drawing a "thick line" (gruba kreska) demarcating the communist period from the present period, without seeking retribution. Opponents of this approach criticize it as too propitiatory and call for a morally rigorous approach, with thorough vetting of all persons in leading positions in politics, business, and the media who were born before 1972.

In the vetting controversy, Wildstein has denounced the "thick-line" proposal and has uncompromisingly advocated for screening, even at the expense of social peace. Wildstein has helped uncover a prominent secret-police informer: Lesław Maleszka, a journalist with the anti-vetting liberal daily, Gazeta Wyborcza, and a former schoolmate and close friend of Wildstein's who had reported on the oppositional Student Solidarity Committee (see above) which he had co-founded with Wildstein. Maleszka has been implicated in the mysterious death of Stanisław Pyjas.

=== Wildstein's List ===
In early 2005, the vetting debate reached a peak after Wildstein had abstracted an inventory of the files stored at the Institute for National Remembrance (IPN) which also manages the files of the former secret police, colloquially known as teczki in Polish. The list contained nothing but the names of roughly 240,000 persons on which such a file exists. Wildstein burned this inventory to CD-ROMs and took it to the offices of his employer, the daily Rzeczpospolita, from where he distributed it among colleagues. Soon afterwards, the list was made available on several anonymous websites, which soon attracted a lot of traffic. Until then, access to files for the general public had been restricted.

Public debate began when Rzeczpospolita's rival, the anti-vetting Gazeta Wyborcza reported that Wildstein had copied and distributed the inventory. One cause for irritation was that the list contained only names of persons with no information on whether they were informers or victims; not to mention the fact that the practice of totalitarian regimes often renders it difficult or impossible to distinguish collaborators from victims. Also, coincidental identity of names occurs frequently, making the list even more difficult to judge. Wildstein himself claimed to have copied and passed on the list as a tool for investigative journalists. In the meantime it is assumed that he acted with tacit approval or was even actively assisted by at least one IPN employee; an internal inquiry as well as preliminary legal proceedings are underway to investigate the circumstances.

While critics claim that Wildstein's disclosure of the list has created a climate of suspicion and irresponsibly endangered social peace, others regard it as a courageous act of civil disobedience. According to them, Wildstein created a fait accompli and thus helped to initiate an overdue review of the past, which had so far been protracted by ex-communist old boys' networks in politics and business and opinion-making relativist intellectuals.

On January 31, 2005 – two days after Gazeta Wyborcza had denounced his manoeuvre – Rzeczpospolita's editor-in-chief dismissed him as a salaried employee, although he continues to contribute freelance articles. With this move, the paper apparently tried to distance itself from the radical advocates of lustracja and remove itself from the focus. On February 1, the popular weekly Wprost offered Wildstein a job and declared it would also publish the list if "technically possible". Also, numerous journalists and public figures, including Józef Glemp, declared their solidarity with Wildstein.
