= Opinion polling for the 1991 Polish parliamentary election =

In the run up to the 1991 Polish parliamentary election, opinion polling was conducted to gauge voting intention in Poland.

== Graphical summary ==
Graphical summary of opinion polls: Democratic Union Democratic Left Alliance Christian National Union Centre Agreement Polish People's Party Confederation of Independent Poland Liberal Democratic Congress Peasants' Agreement Solidarity

== Opinion polls ==
Polling firm	Polling date	Sample size	UD	SLD	WAK ZChN	POC PC	PSL	KPN	KLD	PSL-PL	NSZZ	PPPP	ChD	UPR	SP	SD	MN	PChD	X	Others Undecideds	Lead
Parliamentary election	27 Oct 1991	11,887,949	12.32	11.99	8.74	8.71	8.67	7.50	7.49	5.47	5.05	3.27	2.36	2.26	2.06	1.42	1.18	1.12	0.47	9.92	0.33
OBOP	13–14 Oct 1991	1,123	18.0	2.4	2.0	3.4	2.6	2.7	8.4	4.8	10.6	2.9	3.6	1.8	2.9	1.8	1.2	0.5		29.3 (Note: Others – 3.0, Don't know – 15.5, PPE"Z" – 3.3, RDS – 2.0, PW – 1.9, KPPE – 1.3, BLCh – 0.9, SN – 0.5, NSZZ "Policjantów" – 0.4, PZZ – 0.4, BKW – 0.1, WBM – 0.0)	7.4
CBOS	10–13 Oct 1991	1,500	20	4	3	5	8	8	8	6	8	2	2	1	5	0		0	4	17 (Note: Others – 1, Don't know – 12, PPE – 2, RDS – 1, PWN-SN – 1)	12
OBOP	7–8 Oct 1991	1,060	21.3	4.0	1.7	4.0	1.7	3.6	3.9	3.1	14.1	1.2	3.4	1.4	3.6	2.6	0.5	1.6	2.5	25.7 (Note: Others – 0.8, Don't know – 14.9, PPE"Z" – 2.8, RDS – 1.9, PW – 1.1, ZP – 0.9, SN – 0.9, BLCh – 0.8, NSZZ "Policjantów" – 0.5, KPPE – 0.3, Conf. of Employers – 0.2, PZZ – 0.2, RChS – 0.2, WBM – 0.2, BKW – 0.0)	7.2
OBOP	1–2 Oct 1991	880	17.6	3.7	0.6	7.2	2.7	3.5	2.9	3.5	14.7	0.4	2.3	1.2	2.3	2.3	0.4	2.5	1.7	30.4 (Note: Others – 1.2, Don't know – 22.7, PW – 1.7, PPE"Z" – 1.4, ZP – 1.0, RDS – 0.6, KPPE – 0.6, NSZZ "Policjantów" – 0.4, SN – 0.2, BLCh – 0.2, RChS – 0.2, PZZ – 0.2, Conf. of Employers – 0.0, BKW – 0.0, WBM – 0.0)	2.9
OBOP	23–24 Sep 1991	870	11.5	2.0	1.1	2.2	0.9	2.4	1.3	3.1	14.6	1.8	2.0	0.4	2.2	2.0	1.6	1.3	2.0	46.7 (Note: Others – 1.3, Don't know – 36.4, PPE"Z" – 2.2, PW – 1.8, SN – 1.3, BLCh – 0.9, NSZZ "Policjanci" – 0.7, PZZ – 0.7, RDS – 0.4, ZP – 0.4, KPPE – 0.2, Conf. of Employers – 0.2, RChS – 0.2, BKW – 0.0, WBM – 0.0)	3.1
CBOS	22 Sep 1991		18	6		5	7	3	7	6	8				7				7	6 (Note: Don't know – 6)	10
OBOP	9–10 Sep 1991	761	15.3	5.1 (Note: as Social Democracy of the Republic of Poland)	1.1	5.4	3.5	3.5	2.6	7.0 (Note: as Rural Solidarity)	8.9		2.4 (Note: as Labour Party/Christian Democratic Labour Party)		3.0	1.6			1.9	37.7 (Note: Others – 1.1, Don't know – 28.0, KO"S" – 2.2, RDS – 2.2, PSL "S" – 1.3, "S 80" – 1.3, OPZZ – 1.1, SN – 0.5)	6.4
CBOS	25 Aug 1991		20	4		4	2	3	12	13	7				3				8	9 (Note: Don't know – 9)	7
PBS	May 1991 (Note: Published on 19 May, polled before 11 May)	1,076	23 (Note: UD (club) – 14, ROAD – 8, FPD – 1)	5	3	7	8 (Note: Polish People's Party, Rural Solidarity and PSL "S" together)	8	9		13	7	2	1		1			7	2 (Note: PPS – 1, PUS – 1)	1
CBOS	12–14 Jan 1991	1,500	5 (Note: ROAD – 4, UD (club) – 1, FPD – 0)	1	1	4	7	3	0	9	26		0	1		1				11 (Note: PPE – 4, PSL "S" – 2, PPZ – 2, UChD – 1, OPZZ – 1, PPS – 1, SN – 0, PUS – 0)	17
CBOS	16–19 Feb 1990	1,498		3.1			4.0 (Note: "PSL" – 2.1, PSL "O" – 1.9)	0.5		0.6	41.2 (Note: united Solidarity camp)		0.1	0.6		2.1				4.9 (Note: OPZZ – 1.3, USRP – 0.9, OKP – 0.8, KO – 0.6, PPZ – 0.5, PPS – 0.3, PSL "S" – 0.2, FMW – 0.1, PPS-RD – 0.1, PZPR – 0.1)	38.1
CBOS	13–16 Jan 1990	1,486		2.2 (Note: as Polish United Workers' Party)	0.1		4.8 (Note: PSL "O" – 3.1, "PSL" – 1.7)	0.8		0.7	45.6		0.1	0.4		2.4	0.1			3.5 (Note: OPZZ – 1.7, OKP – 1.2, PPZ – 0.2, CD – 0.1, PPS – 0.1, PPS-RD – 0.1, SN – 0.1)	42.5
CBOS	17–21 Nov 1989	1,497		2.7			4.2 (Note: ZSL – 2.9, "PSL" – 1.3)	0.5		1.1	56.0		0.1	0.1		3.5				3.7 (Note: OKP – 1.2, OPZZ – 0.8, PPZ – 0.8, PSL "S" – 0.2, NZS – 0.1, PA – 0.1, PPS – 0.1, SN – 0.1, "WB" – 0.1, "WiP" – 0.1, ZSL "Piast" – 0.1)	53.1
Parliamentary election	4 Jun 1989	17,156,170		21.42				0.53			71.28									6.78	49.86
