= 1st term Sejm =

1st Sejm
←	Contract Sejm	2nd Sejm	→
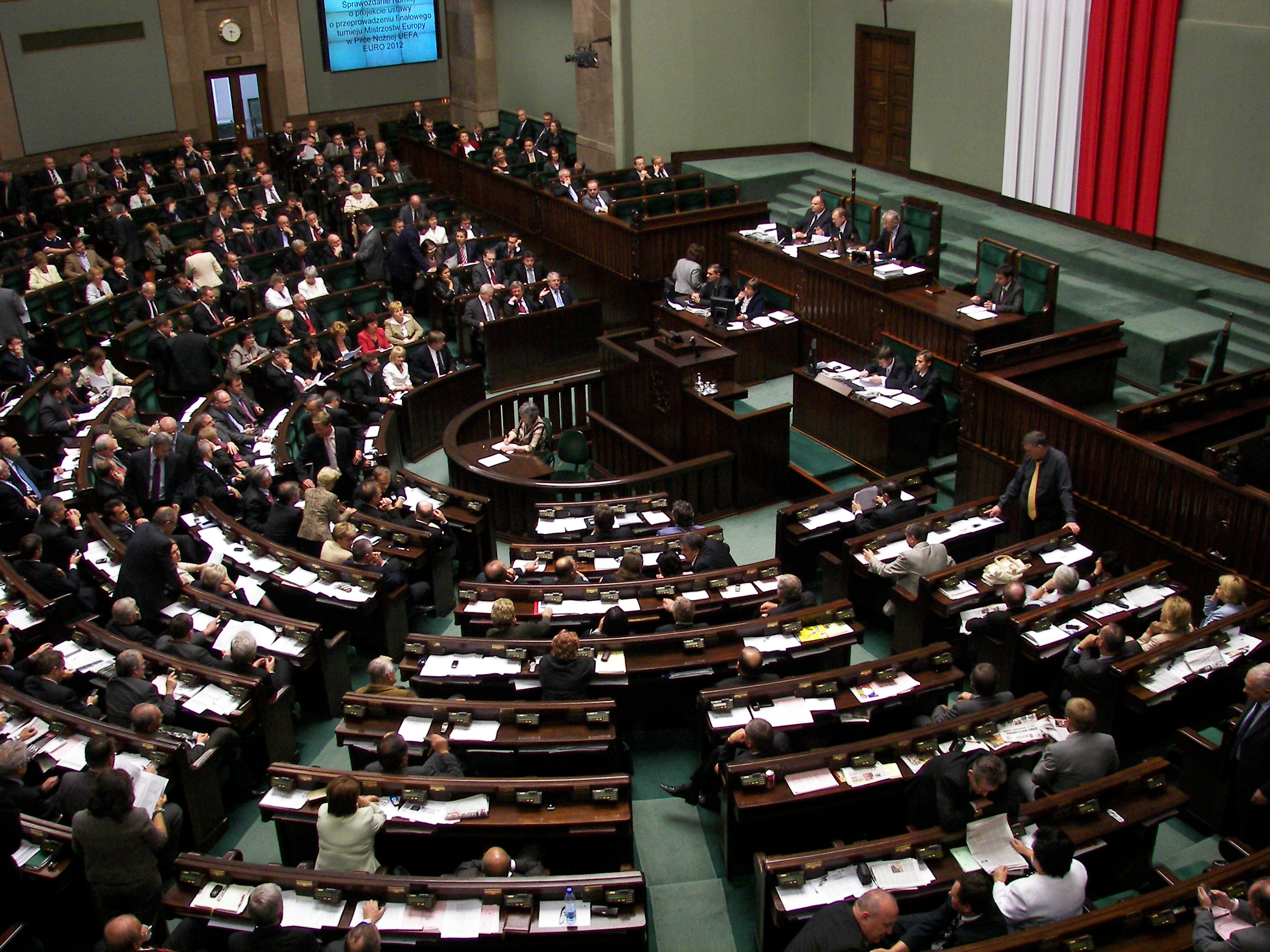

Overview
- Legislative body: Sejm
- Meeting place: Sejm building complex, Warsaw
- Term: 25 November 1991 – 31 May 1993
- Election: 1991
- Government: Olszewski (1991); Pawlak (1992); Suchocka (1992-1993)
- Members: 460
- Senior Marshal: Józef Zych
- Sejm Marshal: Wiesław Chrzanowski
- Deputy Sejm Marshals: Jarosław Kalinowski; Bronisław Komorowski; Marek Kotlinowski; Andrzej Lepper; Wojciech Olejniczak; Genowefa Wiśniowska; Janusz Dobrosz

The Sejm of the Republic of Poland of the First Term (Polish: Sejm Rzeczypospolitej Polskiej I kadencji was active from 25 November 1991 to 31 May 1993. It was formed following the 1991 Polish parliamentary election.

== Overview ==
The Sejm, elected in the first fully democratic elections following the demise of the Polish People's Republic and the creation of the Third Polish Republic, held in October 1991, proved unstable. Establishing a lasting parliamentary and government majority from among ten entities with at least fifteen-person representation turned to be a complex task. Bronisław Geremek, designated prime minister, and one of the leaders of the winning grouping – the Democratic Union, found out about this right after the elections. His mission to create a government based on broadly understood "middle parties" – from the Democratic Union, through the Liberal Democratic Congress, to the Centre Agreement – ended in failure. After this event, the initiative was taken over by the centre-right with a Solidarity-independence background. However, their joint effort only led to the isolation of the post-communist representation (the Democratic Left Alliance). It was unable to reach an agreement on the appointment of a prime minister and government accepted by all with a permanent parliamentary base. The government of Jan Olszewski, formed with the support of the Centre Agreement, the Christian National Union, the People's Agreement, the Labour Solidarity, the Christian Democracy, the Christian Democratic Party, the Solidarity Citizens' Committee and the Polish People's Party, in December 1991 received 235 votes at the start, but it soon turned out that it could actually count on a hundred and a dozen or so certain mandates.

In view of the growing disputes, both internal and external (including with President Lech Wałęsa) in the context of the policy pursued, aimed at departing from the Round Table Agreement (vetting, decommunization) and the Balcerowicz Plan), on 4 June 1992, at the request of President Wałęsa, Olszewski's cabinet was dismissed. In his place, a broad coalition – from the Democratic Union, the Liberal Democratic Congress, the Polish Economic Program, the Confederation of Independent Poland to the Polish People's Party and the Democratic Left Alliance – proposed the leader of the People's Party, Waldemar Pawlak, as prime minister. However, after a month, his mission ended in failure. The leaders of the centrist and some right-wing parties of Solidarity origin returned to talks on selecting a new majority. As a result, in July 1992, the cabinet of Hanna Suchocka was formed, with the participation of politicians from the centre (the Democratic Union, the Liberal Democratic Congress, the Polish Economic Program) and the right (the Christian National Union, the People's Agreement, the Christian People's Party). In the long run, however, both the cabinet and its supporters proved to be incoherent and without a lasting majority, but with an active opposition on the centre-left (Democratic Left Alliance, Polish People's Party) and centre-right (Centre Agreement, Movement for the Republic, Confederation of Independent Poland). At the end of May 1993, the Sejm, at the request of Solidarity Citizens' Committee, passed by a single vote, a vote of no confidence in the government. President Lech Wałęsa did not accept his resignation and dissolved the parliament, setting the date for early elections to the Sejm and Senate for September.

== Notable activitries ==
- October 17, 1992 – The Sejm passed the so-called small constitution repealing most of the provisions of the 1952 Constitution of the Polish People's Republic
- May 28, 1993 – The Sejm expressed a vote of no confidence in Hanna Suchocka's government
- May 31, 1993 – the decree of the President of the Republic of Poland Lech Wałęsa dissolving the Sejm and the Senate came into force

== Composition ==
460 members were elected to the Sejm, 160 of them served previously:.

Party	Votes	%	Seats
Democratic Union	1,382,051	13.30	62
Democratic Left Alliance	1,344,820	12.95	60
Catholic Electoral Action	980,304	9.44	49
Centre Civic Alliance	977,344	9.41	44
Polish People's Party	972,952	9.37	48
Confederation of Independent Poland	841,738	8.10	46
Liberal Democratic Congress	839,978	8.09	37
Peasants' Agreement	613,626	5.91	28
Solidarity	566,553	5.45	27
Polish Beer-Lovers' Party	367,106	3.53	16
Christian Democracy	265,179	2.55	5
Real Politics Union	253,024	2.44	3
Labour Solidarity	230,975	2.22	4
Democratic Party	159,017	1.53	1
German Minority Electoral Committee	132,059	1.27	7
Party of Christian Democrats	125,314	1.21	4
Party X	52,735	0.51	3
Democratic-Social Movement	51,656	0.50	1
Ludowe Porozumienie Wyborcze "Piast" (Note: Regional electoral list of the Polish People's Party in Tarnów Voivodeship.)	42,031	0.40	1
Silesian Autonomy Movement	40,061	0.39	2
Solidarni z Prezydentem (Note: Regional electoral list of the Catholic Electoral Action in Kraków Voivodeship.)	27,586	0.27	1
Związek Podhalan	26,744	0.26	1
Polish Western Union (Note: Satellite party of the Confederation of Independent Poland. All four elected members seated in KPN's parliamentary club. (Note: Ryszard Bogusz; Janina Kraus; Danuta Wierzbicka; Kazimierz Wilk))	26,053	0.25	4
Social Democratic Union of Greater Poland	23,188	0.22	1
Jedności Ludowej (Note: Regional electoral list of the Polish People's Party in Bydgoszcz Voivodeship.)	18,902	0.18	1
Orthodox Electoral Committee	13,788	0.13	1
"Solidarność 80" (Note: Part of Solidarność 80)	12,769	0.12	1
Total	10,387,553	100.00	458
Source: National Electoral Commission

== Sessions ==
The Sejm convened sessions to discuss policy and legislation.

1. Session: 25 and 26 November, 5 and 6 December 1991
2. Session: 17 and 18 December 1991
3. Session: 21 December 1991
4. Session: 23 December 1991
5. Session: 3 and 4 January 1992
6. Session: 23, 24 and 25 January 1992
7. Session: 30, 31 January, 1 February 1992
8. Session: 13, 14, 15 February 1992
9. Session: 26, 27 and 28 February 1992
10. Session: 5 and 6 March 1992
11. Session: 19, 20 and 21 March 1992
12. Session: 2, 3 and 4 April 1992
13. Session: 23, 24 and 25 April 1992
14. Session: 6, 7, 9, and 9 May 1992
15. Session: 21, 22, 23 May 1992
16. Session: 28 May 1992
17. Session: 4, 5, and 6 June 1992
18. Session: 19 and 20 June 1992
19. Session: 1, 2, 3 and 4 July 1992
20. Session: 10 and 11 July 1992
21. Session: 22, 23, 24 and 25 July 1992
22. Session: 29, 30, 31 July and 1 August 1992
23. Session: 3, 4 and 5 September 1992
24. Session: 17, 18, 19 and 30 September 1992
25. Session: October 1, 2, 3, and 7, 1992
26. Session: October 8 and 9, 1992
27. Session: October 15, 16, and 17, 1992
28. Session: October 28, 29, and 30, and November 5, 1992
29. Session: November 5, 6, 7, and 26, 1992
30. Session: November 26, 27, and 28, 1992
