= Opinion polling on the 1989–1993 Polish governments =

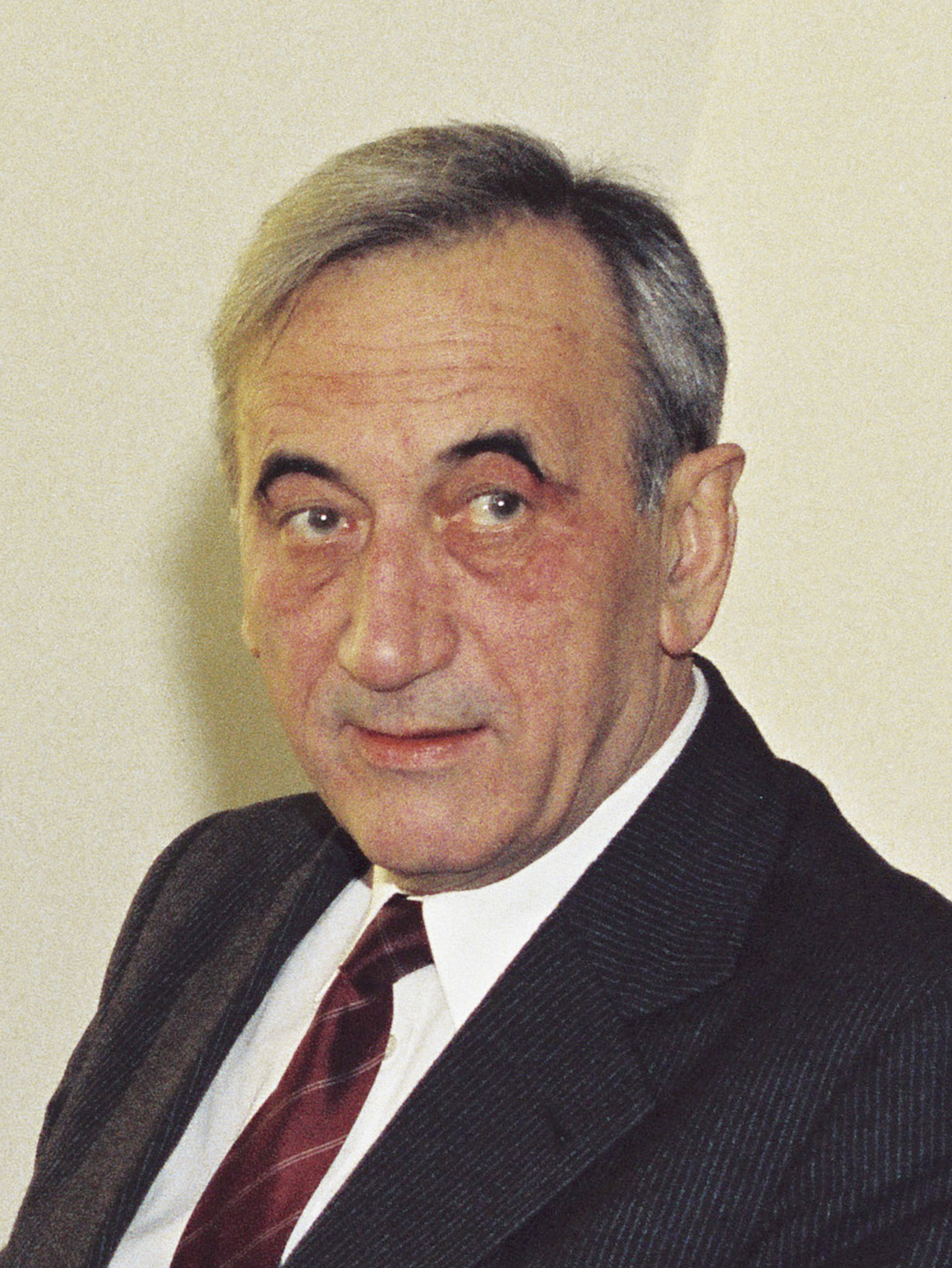
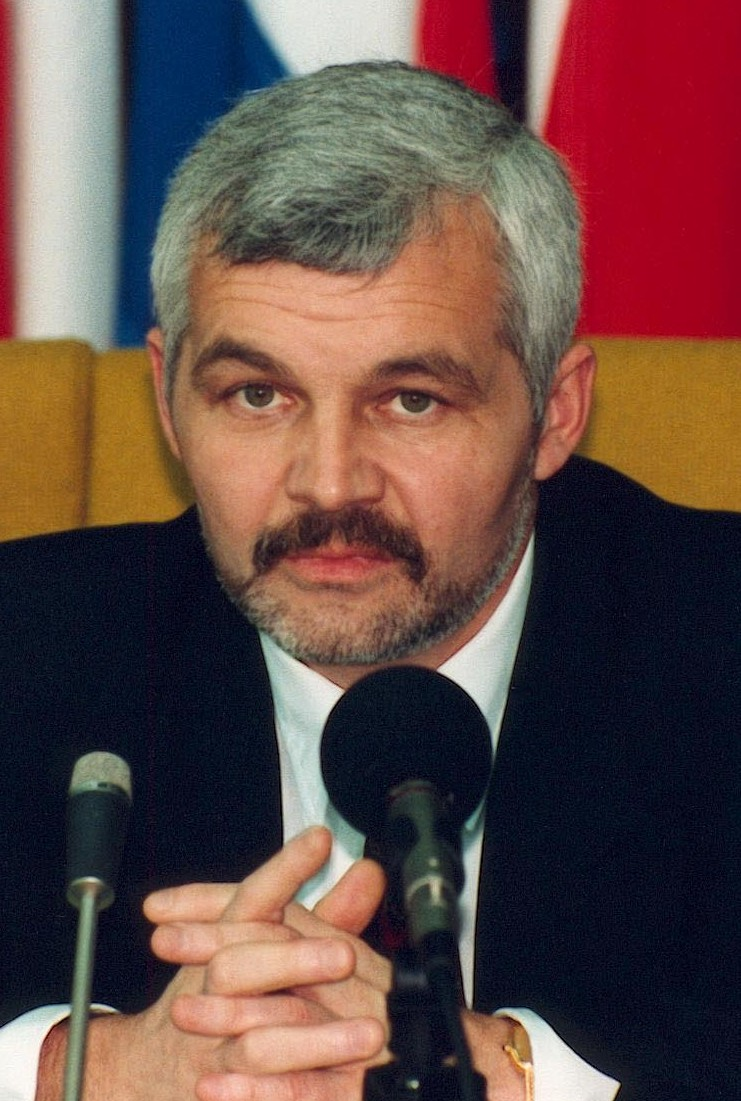
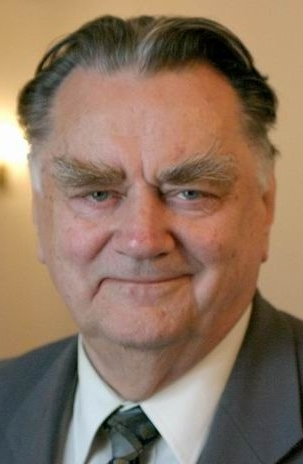
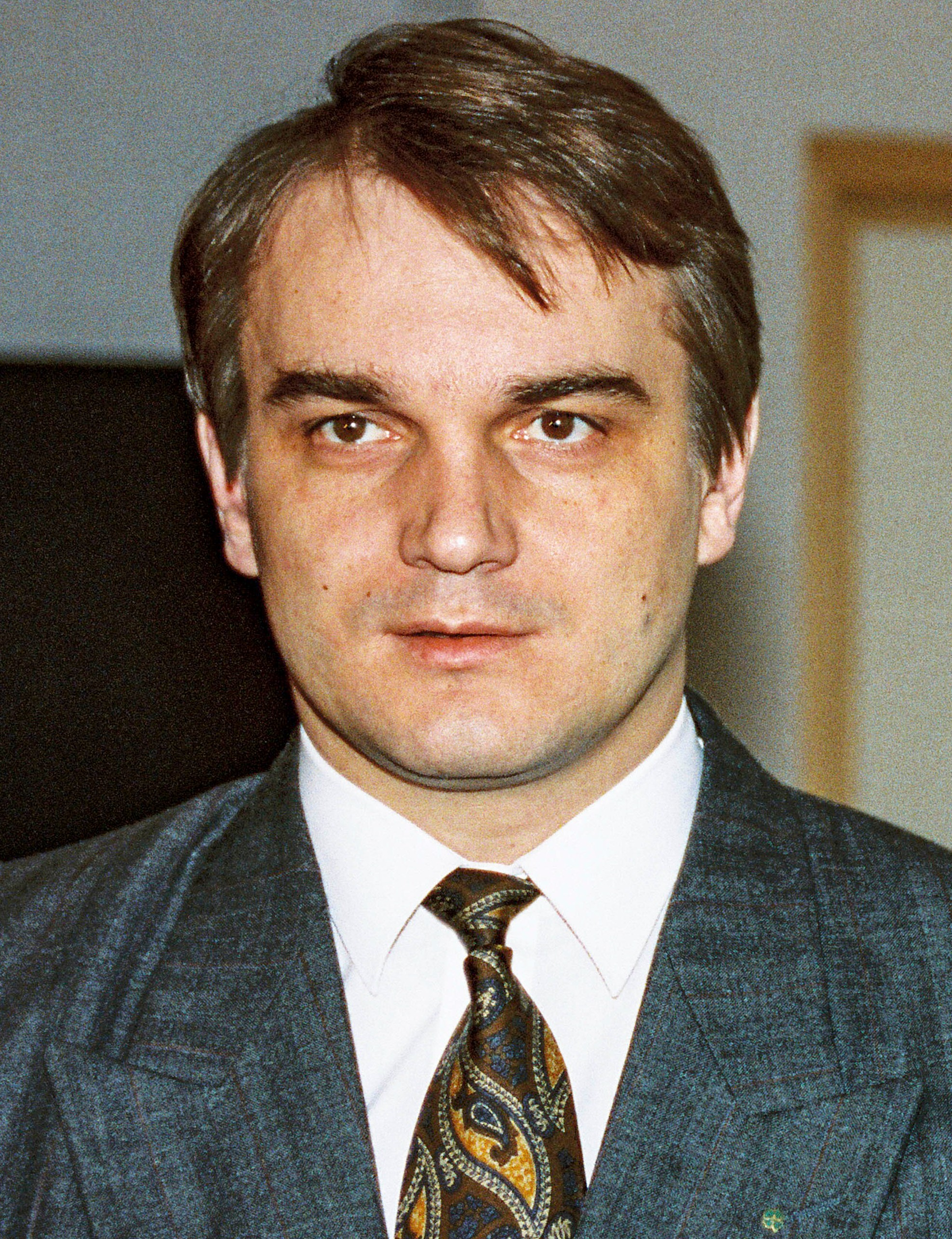
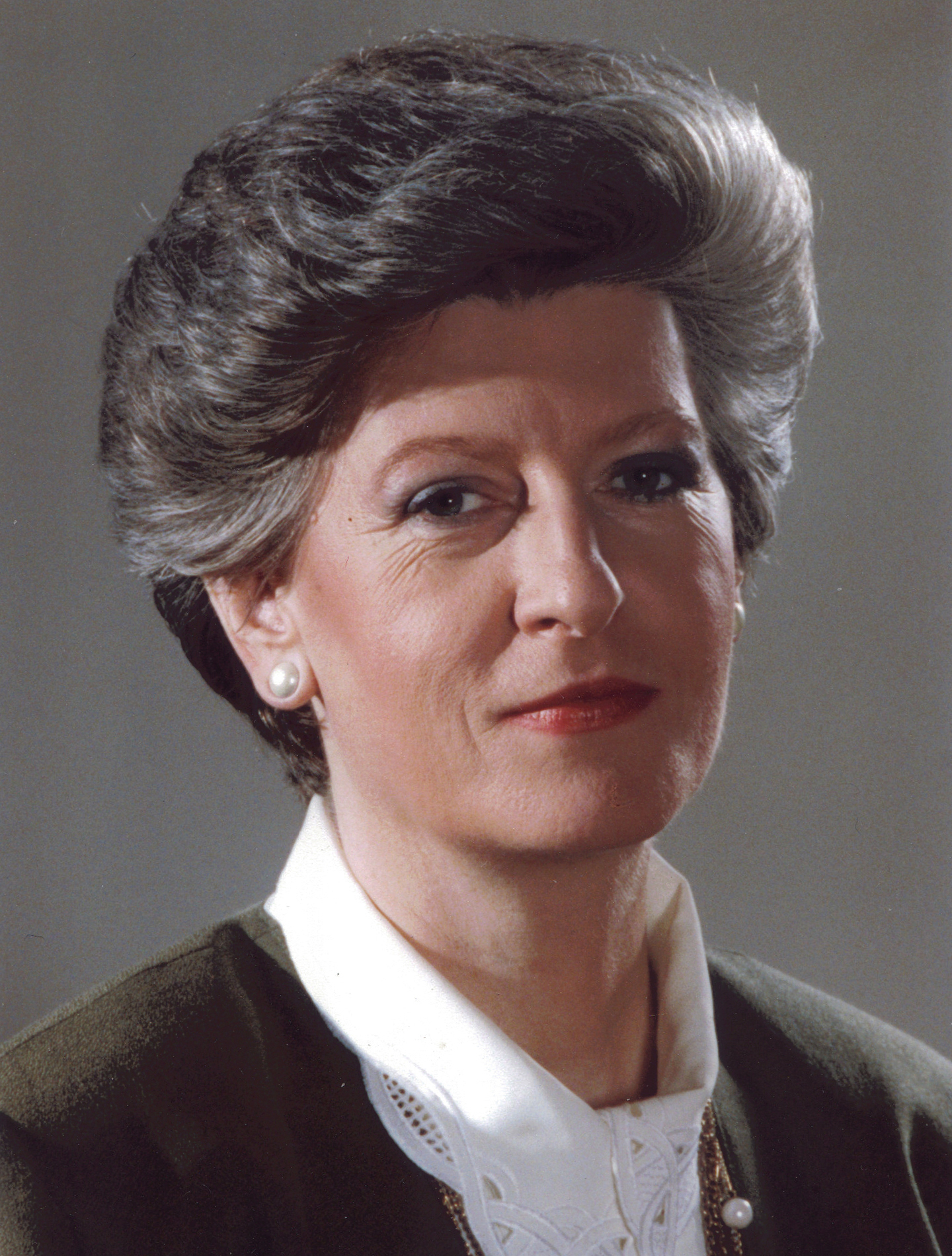
PM Tadeusz Mazowiecki in 1990, PM Jan Krzysztof Bielecki in 1991, PM Jan Olszewski in 2007, PM Waldemar Pawlak in 1994, PM Hanna Suchocka in 1992.

In 1989–1993, in the period following the abolition of communism in Poland with the 1989 Polish parliamentary election to the 1993 Polish parliamentary election, the country was governed by a 5 governments: the Mazowiecki government (1989–1991), Bielecki government (1991), Olszewski government (1991–1992), Pawlak government (1992, lost motion of confidence) and Suchocka government (1992–1993). In the period of these governments, several polling agencies conducted opinion polls researching support for issues regarding their time in power.

== Prime Ministerial approval polls ==
=== Prime Minister Olszewski ===
Date(s) conducted	Polling firm/Link	Sample size	Approve	Disapprove	Neither	Don't know/Neutral	Net approval
2–3 Mar 1992	OBOP	904	40	27		33	13
7–10 Feb 1992	CBOS	1,500	55	25		20	30
3–10 Jan 1992	CBOS	1,000	43	29		40 (Note: 29 — no opinion, 11 — doesn't know Olszewski)	14

=== Prime Minister Mazowiecki ===
Date(s) conducted	Polling firm/Link	Sample size	Approve	Disapprove	Neither	Don't know/Neutral	Net approval
17–23 Oct 1990	CBOS	1,477	73.2	17.0		9.5	56.2
11–27 Sep 1990	CBOS	1,459	72.7	16.2		10.8	56.5
12–15 Jul 1990	CBOS	1,481	76.4	12.1			64.3
Jun 1990	CBOS		81.4	10.2		8.1	71.2
May 1990	CBOS		81.2	8.0		10.8	73.2
Apr 1990	CBOS		84.4	7.1		8.4	77.3
Mar 1990	CBOS (Note: Poll asked whether respondent believed that the person's actions were consistent with the interests of society. In later polls, CBOS later presented this poll as an approval poll.)	1,502	90.0	5.4		4.6	84.6
16–19 Feb 1990	CBOS	1,498	88.9	5.3			83.6
13–15 Jan 1990	CBOS	1,486	91.3	3.7		4.8	87.6
Nov 1989	CBOS		94.7	1.6			93.1

=== Will ... be a good prime minister? ===
Date(s) conducted	Polling firm/Link	Sample size	Subject	Good	Bad	Don't know/Neutral	Net approval
17–19 Jan 1992	OBOP	821	Olszewski	54	23	23	31
18–19 Sep 1989	OBOP		Mazowiecki	81	3	16	78
4–5 Sep 1989	OBOP		Mazowiecki	76	4	20	72

== Governmental approval polls ==
=== Olszewski government ===
Date(s) conducted	Polling firm/Link	Sample size	Approve	Disapprove	Neither	Don't know/Neutral	Net approval
5–10 Mar 1992	CBOS	1,172	33	46		21	–13

=== Mazowiecki government ===
Date(s) conducted	Polling firm/Link	Sample size	Approve	Disapprove	Neither	Don't know/Neutral	Net approval
17–18 Nov 1990	CBOS	1,490	55	29		16	26
8–9 Oct 1990	OBOP	1,000	57	34		9	27
Oct 1990	CBOS		56	26		18	30
11–27 Sep 1990	CBOS	1,459	58	29		13	29
Jul 1990	CBOS		56	28		16	28
22–26 Jun 1990	CBOS	1,490	61	22		17	39
17–23 May 1990	CBOS	1,474	62.4	19.5		18.0	42.9
Apr 1990	CBOS		64.0	19.1		16.7	44.9
Mar 1990	CBOS		67.4	17.4		14.2	50.0
Feb 1990	CBOS		73.9	14.2		11.7	59.7
Jan 1990	CBOS		75.0	11.9		13.0	63.1
Nov 1989	CBOS		87.4	4.5		8.0	82.9
23–24 Oct 1989	OBOP		73	9		18	64

== See also ==
- 1989 Polish parliamentary election
- 1991 Polish parliamentary election
