= National Party (Poland, 1989) =

Political party in Poland

National Party Stronnictwo Narodowe (Polish)
- Abbreviation: SN
- Leader: Jan Matłachowski (1989); Adam Krajewski (1989-1990); Stefan Jarzębski (1990-1991); Maciej Giertych (1991-2001)
- Founder: Jan Ostoja Matłachowski
- Founded: 8 July 1989
- Registered: 21 August 1990
- Dissolved: 30 May 2001
- Preceded by: National Party (1929) (self-declared)
- Succeeded by: League of Polish Families
- Headquarters: Piekarska 6, 00-288 Warszawa
- Newspaper: National Review (Polish: Przegląd Narodowy)
- Membership (1993): 5000
- Ideology: National Democracy; Catholic Nationalism; Polish nationalism Anti-neoliberalism; Factions: National communism Left-wing nationalism Socialism
- Political position: Big tent Grunwald faction: Far-left; Pink faction: Left-wing; Blue faction: Right-wing
- Religion: Roman Catholic
- Alliances: Real Politics Union (1993); National Christian Bloc for Poland (1997)
- Colors: Blue
- Anthem: "Hymn Młodych" ("Youth Anthem")

The National Party (Polish: Stronnictwo Narodowe, SN) was a political party in Poland which was reactivated in 1989 in Warsaw by Jan Ostoja Matłachowski, Leon Mirecki, Maciej Giertych, Bogusław Jeznach, Bogusław Rybicki and others as the successor to the pre-war National Party. Its first chairman was Stefan Jarzębski. The re-activated SN was officially registered on 21 August 1990.

The party adhered to the tradition of endecja, mainly the ideas of Roman Dmowski. The party opposed Poland's membership in the EU and NATO. In the Polish parliamentary election in 1991, the party won 74,082 votes equating to 0,66%. In 1992, the party underwent a split, as one faction led by Bogusław Rybicki formed the Stronnictwo Narodowe “Ojczyzna” (National Party “Fatherland”). Most of its members eventually entered the League of Polish Families (LPR) and dissolved the National Party in 2001.

== History ==
=== Origins ===
The party was formed over a year after the Polish Round Table Agreement, the 1989 Polish parliamentary election and subsequent downfall of the Communist government in Poland. The origins of the 'reactivated' National Party date back to 8 July 1989, when 83-year-old Jan Ostoja Matłachowski, a political activist of the interwar National Party and an associate of Roman Dmowski, founded "Convention of Seniors" (Polish: Konwent Seniorów), which then formed the National Party and claimed to be the direct successor of the interwar-era party of the same name.

The first declaration by the party stated: "On 8 July 1989, in Warsaw, at 6 Piekarska Street, at the meeting of the Seniors of the Polish National Movement [...] Jan Matłachowski and the Convention of Seniors of the Polish National Movement decided to resume the open activity of the party in the country [...]". The Presidium of the Convention consisted of: Jan Matłachowski (chairman), Adam Krajewski (secretary) and Tadeusz Krzyszowski." The new party's claim of being the direct continuation of the interwar National Party was supported by Władysław Matus, who was the oldest surviving member of the National Party in 1991 (he was born in 1888). Matus wrote that the new party had legal continuity through the principle of "co-optation of authorities" included in the 1935 statute of the interwar party.

Some members as well as opponents of the National Party later disputed whether the reactivation and the supposed legal continuity was legitimate. Tomasz Kostyła and Krzysztof Kawęcki, later members of the party, argued that the new National Party was founded by national communist faction of the Polish United Workers' Party, which made the reactivated SN a post-communist movement. This claim later received some substantation after it was revealed that some of the founding members of the party, such as Bogusław Rybicki and Edward Mastej, were former communists. In April 1992, Rybicki admitted that Matłachowski was pressured into reactivating the National Party by a group of Patriotic Movement for National Rebirth (PRON) members. Matłachowski eventually agreed to reform the party after the PRON group that contacted him agreed to his condition of the new party having the exact same name as the interwar one.

Endorsement of Matus as well as the fact that the new party was founded by elderly former interwar activists gave it an aura of legitimacy, attracting hitherto dispersed nationalists. The SN grew, and in November it already had 34 members - mostly from Warsaw and Kraków (the initiators), but also Łódź, Gdańsk, Gliwice and seven other locations. After several meetings of the convention, a national conference of the SN was held on 9 September 1992. The first local unit was to be the Regional Board in Łódź (president Jerzy Sasin, plus Jerzy Sójka, Stefan Kwaśniak, Wanda Chrósciel, Tomasz Kociubiński, Mieczysław Trzcinka), but it did not inaugurate its activities until 7 November. On 14 October, the Warsaw ZO was established (president Arkadiusz Góral, plus Jerzy Syrek, Reginald Choliński).

On 9 November 1991, the founder of the party, Jan Ostoja Matłachowski, passed away. His death was heavily publicized and media also discussed his 'reactivation' of the National Party that he went through in the last months of his life. This led to the rapid growth of the party. With a couple hundred members by the end of the 1989, the party would then have 1500 members in 1990, and reach 4000 members in its prime year of 1991. A week after Matłachowski's death, the party decided to hold another founding convention that would elect new members. It invited multiple newspapers and journalists to record the event.

Shortly after his death, another meeting of national circles from all over the country was held in Warsaw at All Saints' Church, resulting in the establishment of the National Party "Szczerbiec". Representatives of this formation announced that they were taking over the traditions of the pre-war national movement, in particular the 1927 anthem of the Camp of Great Poland, the symbol of the Chrobry sword with the white eagle in the crown and with the cross, and were resuming the publication of the press organ "Voice of the Nation (Polish: Głos Narodu).

A national founding convention was called for 18 November. It was attended by 120 delegates and 60 supporters and gathered the representatives of 23 editorial offices and agencies. Invited guests also included, in addition to distinguished nationalists such as Józef Kossecki and Przemysław Górny, Father Henryk Czepułkowski, Father Tadeusz Gliński, Tadeusz Maciński and a liaison officer with the émigré SN, Leon Mirecki, also Bolesław Tejkowski of the nationalist party Polish National Community (Polish: Polska Wspólnota Narodowa, PWN), Krzysztof Borkowski of the Real Politics Union and Edward Kowalczyk of the Alliance of Democrats. The SN statute of 1935, with some amendments, was adopted as the basis of the party's activities. According to it, supreme authority belonged to the Supreme Council, meeting every six months; it was composed of delegates of the circles, presidents of the District Boards, members of the General Board and the General Committee. Bronisław Ekert was appointed chairman of the Main Board, Professor Stefan Jarzębski was appointed chairman of the Main Board (former minister in the government of the People's Republic of Poland), and Adam Krajewski was appointed chairman of the Main Committee.

=== Beginning and the 1990-1991 elections ===
Despite the party's ambitions to lead the nationalist movement in Poland, this ambition was soon undermined by many splits and competing parties. On 24 August 1990, a party named "National Democracy" (Polish: Narodowa Demokracja) announced its establishment, which was founded by former members of the National Party - Zbigniew Jacniacki, Edward Mastej, Alina Krajewska and Ryszard Filipski. The activists of the party also departed in other directions, including defections to the Congress of the Polish Right (Polish: Kongres Prawicy Polskiej, predecessor to Congress of the New Right). While 1990 was a successful year for the party, splits and defections that took place were a sign of deep divisions within the party that would escalate ever after 1991.

First serious challenge to the party proved to be the 1990 Polish presidential election, with party members being deeply divided over which candidate should be endorsed. The National Party was hostile towards right-leaning, anti-communist candidates such as Tadeusz Mazowiecki and Lech Wałęsa, and warned its supporters against voting for them. Ultimately, the party authorities voted to endorse Roman Bartoszcze, the candidate of the post-communist Polish People's Party (PSL). Back then, PSL was a left-wing, agrarian socialist party identified with the fallen communist regime. This decision was met with resistance, as some factions within the party found it unthinkable to support a left-leaning, post-communist candidate; National Party was thus accused of being a post-communist, left-wing party itself. A small group within the party also broke the ranks to campaign for Stanisław Tymiński, an ultra-populist anti-establishment candidate that presented himself as a businessman "out of nowhere".

Right-wing parts of the party interpreted the decision of the party leadership to support a post-communist candidate as a sign of the party being dominated by former communists. This caused harsh infighting and division within the party, which grew increasingly divided between the "blue" and "pink" factions. The blue camp was staunchly right-wing and focused on closely following the legacy of the interwar movement, while supporting liberal capitalism and anti-communism. The pink faction, in contrast, was left-wing, vehemently anti-capitalist and socialist and either accepted or was sympathetic towards Communist Poland; the pink camp was dedicated solely to economic matters and ignored social issues, and the members of the factions openly mocked the Polish right for attacking immigrants and Jews instead of focusing on the hardship of the working class. Prior to this point, both factions were largely isolated from each other, with the pink faction being relegated to writing and promoting the party's economic program (with the party being quite left-wing economically as the result), while the blue faction was responsible for social issues. However, after the 1990 presidential elections, both factions started openly fighting with each other.

The internal division led to radical changes in the party leadership. On 11 November 1991, the hitherto leader of the party, Jarzębski, was replaced with Józef Więcławek associated with the émigré National Party. Then on 28 April 1991, Leon Mirecki became the honorary president of the party, and Maciej Giertych was elected chairman of the party's supreme council, with some members being subsequently replaced as well. In August 1991, Krzysztof Kawęcki, associated with the "orthodox right", joined the party as well. However, changes in leadership did not prevent new secessions; the entire party's district in Piła defected to Christian National Union when the party's leadership did not condemn Rybicki's (the leader of the pink faction) support for Tymiński in the 1990 election.

The party was further endangered by the formation of a rival National Democratic Party (Polish: Stronnictwo Narodowo-Demokratyczne, SND) in 1991, formed on the initiative of the émigré party. The majority of the National Party's members in Kraków, including the local chairman Stanisław Szuro, switched to the new party in May 1991. The local branches of SN in Ostrołęka and Łomża were also sympathetic towards the newly formed party, and defections to the National Democratic Partz also took place in regions such as Zamojszczyzna. This fracturing of the national movement was also reflected in the party's newspaper National Review (Polish: Przegląd Narodowy), where the party leadership removed editor-in-chief Cz. Mazur in April 1991 for his sympathies towards the SND. Further splits took place, as on 9 April 1991, another party known as the Democratic-National Party (Polish: Stronnictwo Demokratyczno-Narodowe) was formed, as well as the National Democracy Political Party (Polish: Stronnictwo Polityczne Narodowa Demokracja). The party leadership negotiated unification with the far-right SN "Szczerbiec" and then SND, but both talks failed.

Given the divided nature of the party, the National Party entered the 1991 Polish parliamentary election as a conglomeration of contradictory tendencies. In Warsaw Voivodeship, Lublin Voivodeship, Płock Voivodeship and the Biała Podlaska Voivodeship, the party fielded former members of the Polish United Workers' Party and otherwise communist-associated candidates. Meanwhile, in other voivodeships, the part also fielded members of the far-right SN "Szczerbiec" party. In the end, the National Party performed very badly, in what was dubbed a "spectacular defeat" by the press. The party received 74,082 votes, which amounted to 0.66% of the popular vote. The party unsuccessfully tried to gain the support of the Polish Catholic Church; while the Church largely stayed neutral, individual priests endorsed parties such as the Catholic Electoral Action, Centre Civic Alliance, Peasants' Agreement, Christian Democracy and the Party of Christian Democrats - but not the SN.

=== Internal divisions ===
Along with the electoral defeat, the party also faced delegalization threats, as after the election, the deputies of the largest party in the Sejm, the centrist Democratic Union, made a demand to outlaw the SN given the antisemitic overtones used by some of the party's members. The Prosecutor General Wiesław Chrzanowski announced a review of the tapes of the SN's election campaign, and prime minister Jan Krzysztof Bielecki announced an investigation into the party. The result of the party greatly benefited the left-wing Grunwald and pink factions within the party, with the leader of the pink faction, Rybicki, blaming the electoral defeat on the party on hateful antisemitic and anti-immigration rhetoric, as well as scaring away young voters and women. Describing the campaign of his party's right wing, Rybicki stated: "On the one hand, gentlemen in their 70s were exhorting young people to support our list, while on the other hand, Mr Andrzej Horodecki [...] thundered that Polish women must give birth to four children each and take care of the household."

Nationalist competitors of the SN, on the other hand, blamed the party's defeat on the "socialist line" adopted by the party, which was a view shared by right-wing factions. A member of the blue faction, Andrzej Marszałkowski, wrote that "the activities of the SN's central authorities are mainly internal disputes - above all as a result of the destructive activities of Bogusław Rybicki and other communists". A split became inevitable, and on 25 January 1992, the supreme council of the party very narrowly voted to maintain the blue-dominated leadership of the party. On 20 February, the party leadership voted to expel Rybicki from the party. In protest, multiple well-known party activists such as B. Jeznach, W. Łęczycki, R. Choliński and J. Michalik left the party, along with significant part of the party's regional structures - in total, up to 23 party's regional districts were reduced to less than 30% of the pre-expulsion numbers. Bogusław Rybicki and his pink faction then founded their own party - the National Party "Fatherland", which came to represent the left-wing variant of National Democracy.

However, despite the expulsion of the pink faction, the party continued to be attacked and discredited by other right-wing parties. One of the issues that remained in the party was that despite the exodus of the 'pink camp', the national-communist Grunwald faction remained influential, which led to the 'post-communist' label of the SN. On 24 February 1992, Krzysztof Kawęcki resigned from the SN, claiming that despite the expulsion of Rybacki and his pink faction, "the Supreme Council did not get around to excluding from the National Party a group of people with leftist-national views, often with a communist past. Continuing to tolerate this dualism within the SN is unacceptable and detrimental to the authenticity of the National Party." He also argued that despite the departure of the pink camp, the party continues to engage in "statism and socialist demagogy". On 26 February, Jan Trochimiak, chairman of the regional party branch in Lublin, left the party to try and reactivate the Camp of Great Poland.

By late 1992, the party was in disastrous state, given the loss of members and influence from both left and right. The effective territorial presence in Poland shrank by about 50%, and activists in Jelenia Góra chose to dissolve their regional branch, writing that "continued activity in the structures of the dying SN does not give any chance for a proper influence on the fate of Poland." The weakness of the party was further shown by an unsuccessful attempt to organise a demonstration under the slogan "Buy Polish goods only" in June 1992, as an attempt to appeal to protectionist and farmer circles. The situation of the party was suddenly saved by a split in the SND, with two-thirds of the party rebelling against the party's leader, Zamoyski. On 10 October 1992, at the joint meeting of secessionists from the SND, the attentands made a decision to join the National Party. In effect, the party gained several hundred new members.

=== Recovery and 1993 election ===
By 1993, the party had 5000 members. SN members increasingly demonstrated in the streets, such as on 25 May 1993, in Kraków, with the slogan "We don't want asylum seekers in Poland" (together with NOP and the "national current of ZChN"), and on 11 November 1993 in Wrocław with the slogan "Silesia always Polish" (together with SN "Szczerbiec" and PWN). The SN-affiliated Social Committee for the Celebration of the Outbreak of the Third Silesian Uprising in Opole (led by Bolesław Grabowski) initiated in 1993 the Third May rallies of nationalists on Góra Św. Anny (St. Anne's Mountain), which soon became a tradition of the renewed National Party. On 17–18 July 1993, a conference "For a Catholic State of the Polish Nation" was organised in Krzeszowice with the participation of 200 people (including guests from Ireland). The board of the Dmowski Institute was successfully changed, with the SN gaining a majority.

The weakness of the Party, however, forced the party - in view of the upcoming 1993 Polish parliamentary election - to search intensively for an ally. The party decided against seeking an alliance with other nationalist parties, at which it was still at odds. Although at the KG meeting on 20 March 1993, at the insistence of F. Kamiński (vice-chairman of RN) and T. Radwan (chairman of ZO Katowice), a decision was taken to start unification talks with the left-wing National Party "Fatherland", the initiative soon collapsed. Instead, the Real Politics Union (UPR) became an electoral partner in June 1993. The main committee of the National Party decided by a ratio of 14:12 to support the UPR list in exchange for 25% of the seats.

The decision sparked fierce controversy. The idea of a professional army, the call for the privatisation of schools, slogans such as "Alcohol half the price" - were in clear contradiction to the ideology of the National Democracy. At a meeting of the Central Committee on 7 August, the Giertych line (which was supported by, among others, A. Fedorowicz from Białystok, Wilczyńska and Staszewski from Łódź) was opposed both by supporters of cooperation with "Fatherland" (five districts, including Piotrków and Opolski) and the Warsaw District, advocating an alliance with J. Olszewski's Movement for the Republic (RDR). The party faced de facto disintegration. The Piotrków District was to decide to join the SN "Faterland" on 28 July, the Opole Silesia District on 1 September. Some districts together with RdR, Solidarność '80, Civitas Christiana, K. Świtoń's Upper Silesian Christian Democracy and the National Party of the Unemployed co-founded the Coalition for the Republic.

The election on 20 September 1993 ended in defeat. The UPR (although it recorded almost double the vote) with a percentage of 3.18% did not cross the 5% electoral threshold. None of the SN members won a seat. In the Łomża district, Senate candidates Giertych and Fedorowicz took the last two seats (presumably their votes were taken over by SN "Fatherland" candidates). But the competitors - above all B. Rybicki's 'Fatherland' - were not successful in the elections either. This made the situation of the party remain stable, though the division with the left-wing Fatherland deepened - on 2 October 1993, the party's main committee rejected the possibility of unification with the SN 'Fatherland'.

=== Cooperation with mainstream parties ===
In the spring of 1994, the Party tried to make its mark in the 1994 Polish local elections, either running as an independent party (e.g. in Poznań), or in various coalitions - in Łódź, the party became a part of the Right Łódź (Polish: Prawa Łódź) coalition, with the Party of Christian Democrats, Christian National Union and Peasants' Agreement. The following year, an opportunity to mobilise forces was the presidential election. SN tried to put forward its candidate - Maciej Giertych - but the attempt to collect the required number of signatures failed. In 1995, the SN also ran the "For a Safe Poland" campaign to ensure the safety of citizens (this was to be achieved by civic patrols set up in several cities in southern Poland).

The situation, in which the post-communist left, which had been in power since autumn 1993, became the main object of attack, fostered a rapprochement with the post-Solidarity right. This enabled the movement to gain new members, such as Wacław Cieplucha, an activist of the Centre Agreement and Movement for the Republic, from 1994 a councillor of the Warsaw-Wola borough on behalf of Prawica Razem, joined the national movement in 1996 by becoming vice-president of the Warsaw District of the SN. The main fields of cooperation were Catholic movements, in which the Party sought its support (e.g. on 29 April 1994, M. Giertych spoke at a meeting of Catholic Action in Ołtarzewo, on 29 December 1994 he was received by Primate Glemp).

The party nevertheless decided to keep their distance from the mainstream right-wing parties, especially in the view of persisting pressure from Grundwald parties. The party refused to endorse Hanna Gronkiewicz-Waltz, the candidate supporter by the Christian National Union, in the 1995 Polish presidential election, instead endorsing Waldemar Pawlak and then Lech Wałęsa against the post-communist candidate Aleksander Kwaśniewski. Nevertheless, the party was very critical of the right-wing candidates, arguing that the post-Solidarity "wants to build an independence camp, but by giving up sovereignty in NATO and the EU". The party was against co-founding an anti-communist bloc, instead wishing to organise with Catholic and nationalist groupings, as well as agrarian parties; influential member of the party, Giertych, postulated a broad "patriotic coalition" based on the Polish People's Party.

=== Final years ===
Gearing up for the 1997 Polish parliamentary election, the National Party became an electoral partner of the People's National Party (Polish: Stronnictwo Ludowo-Narodowe, SLN) led by Czesław Bloch. On 26 May 1996, in Wierzchosławice, both parties formed the All-Polish Alliance (Polish: Przymierze Wszechpolskie, which would later be expanded to include the Polish Kresy Party (Polish: Polskie Stronnictwo Kresowe) led by Edward Prus, the Patriotic Association (Polish: Stowarzyszenie Patriotyczne) and SN "Szczerbiec", as well as minor organizations such as the Movement of Citizens Wronged by Authority (Polish: Ruch Obywateli Krzywdzonych przez Władzę) led by Kazimierz Świtoń and the Patriotic Association Silesia (Polish: Towarzystwo Patriotyczne Śląsk). The coalition was quickly dissolved however, as the SLN decided to join the Solidarity Electoral Action, while the National Party joined the Bloc for Poland (Polish: BBWR - Blok dla Polski, BdP), formed by the former leader of Nonpartisan Bloc for Support of Reforms, Andrzej Gąsienica-Makowski.

Maciej Giertych, commenting on the National Party's decision to work together with Bloc for Poland, wrote that "only the Bloc for Poland has a Catholic and national programme" and joined the cooperation, e.g. by delivering a paper at the BdP meeting on 16 March or participating in the Bloc's convention on 22 June 1996. The same was done by nationalists in the field - e.g. during the 11 November 1996 manifestation in Rzeszów skinheads from the SN carried BBWR banners. The Bloc for Poland registered its lists in all 52 constituencies - in 7 the nationalists from SN came first, and in 19 they were further down the list. The Bloc, however, was unsuccessful, receiving only 1.36% of the vote. The Bloc decided to transform itself into a party, but the National Party was no longer interested in further cooperation by then.

After the 1997 election, the party visibly declined and was rarely mentioned in the media, with the party membership and activity stagnating as well. Before the 1998 Polish local elections, the party made yet another attempt at consolidation. The Bloc for Poland, SND, ROP, KPN - Patriotic Camp (A. Słomka), the National Pensions and Pensioners' Agreement of the Republic of Poland and many other entities formed the Homeland Patriotic Movement (Polish: Ruch Patriotyczny „Ojczyzna”. However, this coalition also proved unsuccessful, as the coalition only received 3,19% of the popular vote. Local coalitions were also formed, such as Porozumienie Samorządowe "Uwłaszczenie Warszawy" with the participation also of SND, PZKS, the Polish Enfranchisement Movement, Ruch "Moja Ojczyzna", Krajowe Porozumienie Emerytów i Rencistów RP, Duszpasterstwa Oboz Oświęcimskiego Więźniów, Społeczne Komitet Uczczenia Pamięci Romana Dmowskiego, Partia Kupiecka, "Solidarność" named after Father Jerzy Popiełuszko and a group of ROP activists.

On 19 December 1999, the unification of the National Party with the National Democratic Party, which was not formally realised, took place. The SN candidate in the 2000 Polish presidential election was General Tadeusz Wilecki, who received only 28,805 votes, i.e. 0.16% support. In 2001, the National Party was disbanded to establish the League of Polish Families.

== Electoral results ==
=== Presidential ===
Election year	1st round			2nd round		
Election year	Candidate	# of overall votes	% of overall vote	Candidate	# of overall votes	% of overall vote
1990	Supported Roman Bartoszcze	1,176,175	7.15 (#5)	Supported Stanisław Tymiński	3,683,098	25.75 (#2)
1995	Supported Waldemar Pawlak	770,419	4.31 (#5)	Supported Lech Wałęsa	9,058,176	48.28 (#2)
2000	Tadeusz Wilecki	28,805	0.16 (#11)	No second round		

=== Sejm ===
Election year	# of votes	% of vote	# of overall seats won	+/–
1991	74,082	0.66	0 / 460	New
1993	438,559	3.18	0 / 460	Steady
On behalf of the Real Politics Union, which won no seats.
1997	178,395	1.36	0 / 460	Steady
As part of the National Christian Bloc for Poland coalition, which won no seats.

=== Senate ===
Election year	# of votes	% of vote	# of overall seats won	+/–
1991	64,916	0.56	0 / 100	New
1993	434,657	1.59	0 / 100	Steady
On behalf of the Real Politics Union, which won no seats.
1997	146,770	1.12	0 / 100	Steady
As part of the National Christian Bloc for Poland coalition, which won no seats.

=== Regional assemblies ===
Election year	% of vote	# of overall seats won	+/–
1994		0 / 855	New
As part of various coalitions.
1998	3.19 (#6)	2 / 855	▲2
As part of Ruch Patriotyczny Ojczyzna.

== Ideology ==
Superficially, the party claimed to be a legal successor and a reactivation of the interwar National Party, which represented the Polish National Democracy, which was right-wing by principle. The main goal of the National Party was an establishment of a Polish Catholic state, which was to combine political Catholicism, Polish nationalism and the principles of National Democracy. The party intended to play a leading role in the Polish national movement, and consistently sought cooperation with other parties and movements in order to create a broad nationalist front. The party claimed to have its framework lie "in the school of Roman Dmowski and sought to gain legitimacy by portraying its fidelity to the "age-old program" of National Democracy. One of the party's early leaders, Kawęcki, argued that Dmowski's ideas were "up-to-date, actually unchangeable". To emphasize this, the party also adopted the original statute of the interwar National Party from 1935 as its own, although the statute and program would be gradually modified since then.

Despite this claim, the party also acknowledged that it adhered to a specific version of Polish National Democracy, with Kawęcki stating that the reactivated National Party referred directly to the tradition of interwar National Democracy that came to be in the second half of the 1930s, where Polish nationalism was unified with Catholicism. In this way, the party consistently affirmed the concept of "Pole-Catholic", according to which Catholicism is the essence of the Polish culture and not only an integral part of it, but also its very source; in this way, the party argued that one cannot be a Pole without being a Roman Catholic. The official newspaper of the party, the National Review, writing on the legacy of the Catholic-nationalist version of National Democracy that the party adheres to, explained: "The evolution of national doctrine allowed it to come into contact in the 1920s with Catholic social teaching. We were delighted to find in it the principle of ordo caritatis, the order of charity, developed by St Thomas Aquinas. This principle proclaims the overriding duty to serve the natural communities and those closest to man - that is, the family and the nation." This approach allowed to party to include Catholic activists, clergyman and even saints and its "progenitors", along with directly referring to the social doctrine of the Catholic Church.

In practice, the party was a big tent of various ideological currents and movements, where the adherence to National Democracy was only used as a label, and the ideological influence of it was limited to the political rhetoric of the party. Polish political scientist Jarosław Tomasiewicz argues that the party could not be defined as right-wing, and notes that fellow nationalist parties rejected it, calling it left-wing and post-communist. This argument was based on the fact that many national communists were involved in the creation of the party, with the party's attachment to National Democracy serving as a way for far-left nationalists from Patriotic Association "Grunwald" as well as the Patriotic Movement for National Rebirth to distance themselves from their involvement in the communist regime. This was confirmed by one of the co-founder of the party, Krzysztof Kawęcki, in April 1992, and served to discredit the 'reactivated' National Party amongst right-wing nationalist and anti-communist circles ever since.

The communist presence in the party was particularly visible in its economic program, which strongly criticized the post-1989 Polish governments for its privatization and deregulation policies, and accused it of selling Polish industry to Western capital at the expense of Polish national interest. The party also took a heavily protectionist stance, arguing that foreign capital in Poland is being prioritized and that privatization serves to empower foreign interests as well as the wealthy few at expense of the Polish working class. According to the party, every businessman, including a Polish one, is a "geszefciarz" ("immoral profiteer"). Chief writer in the party's newspaper, Andrzej Ligęza, wrote: "[A] geszefciarz is a man whose only important goal and motive is profit. However, the way of achieving profit, ethical or social considerations are of no importance here. A geszefciarz is a leech sucking profit out of everything possible without producing any socially useful values." Even the blue faction of the party, that claimed allegiance to free market, acknowledged the need for the Polish state to maintain complete state control over vital industries, especially the military and agriculture, which the party saw as doomed without heavy state protection and intervention; the blue faction also postulated price control and profit margin (Polish: marża) control. Tomasiewicz also noted the heavily Keynesian rhetoric of the supposedly 'free-market' factions, especially when criticizing the Polish government's anti-inflation measures. Factionally, the party had supporters of socialism, etatism and welfare state.
