= 1991 Polish parliamentary election =

- 27 October 1991
- Opinion polls
- Registered: 27,517,280
- First Term Sejm
- All 460 seats in the Sejm; 231 seats needed for a majority
- Turnout: 11,887,949 (43.20%)
Party	Leader	Vote %	Seats
UD	Tadeusz Mazowiecki	12.32	62
SLD	Aleksander Kwaśniewski	11.99	60
WAK	Wiesław Chrzanowski	8.74	49
POC	Jarosław Kaczyński	8.71	44
PSL	Waldemar Pawlak	8.67	48
KPN	Leszek Moczulski	7.50	46
KLD	Donald Tusk	7.49	37
PSL-PL	Józef Ślisz	5.47	28
KO "S"	Marian Krzaklewski	5.05	27
PPPP	Janusz Rewiński	3.27	16
ChD	N/A	2.36	5
UPR	Janusz Korwin-Mikke	2.26	3
SP	R. Bugaj & K. Modzelewski	2.06	4
SD	Aleksander Mackiewicz	1.42	1
KWMN	Henryk Kroll	1.18	7
PChD	Krzysztof Pawłowski	1.12	4
X	Stanisław Tymiński	0.47	3
RDS	Zbigniew Bujak	0.46	1
LPW "Piast" (Note: Regional electoral list of the Polish People's Party in Tarnów Voivodeship.)	N/A	0.37	1
RAŚ	Paweł Musioł	0.36	2
This lists parties that won seats. See the complete results below.
- Senate
- All 100 seats in the Senate; 51 seats needed for a majority
- Turnout: 11,887,865 (43.20%)
Party	Vote %	Seats
UD	16.42	21
SLD	10.61	4
KO "S"	9.68	11
POC	9.04	9
WAK	8.71	9
PSL	7.38	7
KLD	6.53	6
KPN	4.67	4
PSL-PL	3.14	5
PChD	2.22	3
Independents	16.18	21
This lists parties that won seats. See the complete results below.

Government before	Government after election
Bielecki cabinet KLD–UD—PC–ZChN—SD	Olszewski cabinet PC–ZChN—PSL-PL—SLCh

Parliamentary elections were held in Poland on 27 October 1991 to elect deputies to the First Term Sejm and the Senate, the two houses of the National Assembly. The 1991 election was notable on several counts. It was the first parliamentary election to be held since the formation of the Third Republic, the first entirely free and competitive legislative election since the fall of communism, the first completely free legislative election of any sort since 1928. Due to the collapse of the Solidarity political wing, the Solidarity Citizens' Committee, the 1991 election saw deep political fragmentation, with a multitude of new parties and alliances emerging in its wake. Low voting thresholds within individual constituencies, along with a five percent national threshold allocated to a small portion of the Sejm, additionally contributed to party fragmentation. As a result, 29 political parties gained entry into the Sejm and 22 in the Senate, with no party holding a decisive majority. Two months of intense coalition negotiations followed, with Jan Olszewski of the Centre Agreement forming a minority government along with the Christian National Union, remnants of the broader Centre Civic Alliance, and the Peasants' Agreement, with conditional support from Polish People's Party, Solidarity list and other minor parties.

460 members of parliament (Polish: poseł) were elected; 391 from 6980 candidates from 37 regional lists of candidates and 69 from country-wide lists of candidates. In the Sejm elections, 27,517,280 citizens were eligible to vote, 11,887,949 (43.2%) of them cast their votes and 11,218,602 (94.4%) of the votes were counted as valid. In the Senate elections, 43.2% of citizens cast their votes, 96.5% were valid.

Elections were supervised by the National Electoral Commission (Polish: Państwowa Komisja Wyborcza). 37 regional (Polish: okręgowe) commissions were formed, and 22,341 district (Polish: obwodowe), staffed by 197,389 citizens.

A total of 111 parties contested the elections, of which 29 won parliamentary seats. The success of the satirical Polish Beer-Lovers' Party with 16 seats gained news coverage worldwide.

== Opinion polls ==
Graphical summary of opinion polls: Democratic Union Democratic Left Alliance Christian National Union Centre Agreement Polish People's Party Confederation of Independent Poland Liberal Democratic Congress Peasants' Agreement Solidarity

== Results ==
=== Sejm ===
Party	Votes	%	Seats
Democratic Union	1,382,051	12.32	62
Democratic Left Alliance	1,344,820	11.99	60
Catholic Electoral Action	980,304	8.74	49
Centre Civic Alliance	977,344	8.71	44
Polish People's Party	972,952	8.67	48
Confederation of Independent Poland	841,738	7.50	46
Liberal Democratic Congress	839,978	7.49	37
Peasants' Agreement	613,626	5.47	28
Solidarity	566,553	5.05	27
Polish Beer-Lovers' Party	367,106	3.27	16
Christian Democracy	265,179	2.36	5
Real Politics Union	253,024	2.26	3
Labour Solidarity	230,975	2.06	4
Democratic Party	159,017	1.42	1
German Minority Electoral Committee	132,059	1.18	7
Party of Christian Democrats	125,314	1.12	4
Polish Ecological Party - Greens	91,726	0.82	0
"Healthy Poland" - Ecological Alliance	89,034	0.79	0
Freedom Party	78,704	0.70	0
National Party	74,082	0.66	0
Coalition of the Polish Ecological Party and Polish Greens Party	71,043	0.63	0
Party X	52,735	0.47	3
Democratic-Social Movement	51,656	0.46	1
Ludowe Porozumienie Wyborcze "Piast"	42,031	0.37	1
Silesian Autonomy Movement	40,061	0.36	2
Christian-Peasant Bloc	36,665	0.33	0
Christian-Social Movement "Covenant"	30,092	0.27	0
Minority Electoral Bloc	29,428	0.26	0
Solidarni z Prezydentem (Note: Regional electoral list of the Catholic Electoral Action in Kraków Voivodeship.)	27,586	0.25	1
Związek Podhalan	26,744	0.24	1
Polish Western Union (Note: Satellite party of the Confederation of Independent Poland. All four elected members seated in KPN's parliamentary club. (Note: Ryszard Bogusz; Janina Kraus; Danuta Wierzbicka; Kazimierz Wilk))	26,053	0.23	4
Republican Coalition	23,506	0.21	0
Social Democratic Union of Greater Poland	23,188	0.21	1
Independent Self-Governing Trade Union of Policemen	22,444	0.20	0
Jedności Ludowej (Note: Regional electoral list of the Polish People's Party in Bydgoszcz Voivodeship.)	18,902	0.17	1
Craftsmanship and Petty Bourgeoisie	14,089	0.13	0
Orthodox Electoral Committee	13,788	0.12	1
"Solidarność 80" (Note: Part of Solidarność 80)	12,769	0.11	1
Self-Governing Republic Union	11,955	0.11	0
NSZZ "Solidarność 80"	11,297	0.10	0
Coalition of Female Circles	10,587	0.09	0
Citizens' Committee in Tarnów	9,704	0.09	0
Unia Wielkopolan	9,019	0.08	1
Confederation of Private Employers	8,446	0.08	0
List of Chairman Zbigniew Morawski	8,379	0.07	0
Regional Electoral Forum	7,724	0.07	0
German Minority "Reconciliation and Future"	6,108	0.05	0
Belarusian Electoral Committee	6,081	0.05	0
Greater Polish Self-Governing Coalition	5,939	0.05	0
Independent - Entrepreneurs	5,604	0.05	0
Tenants and Pensioners in Solidarity	5,497	0.05	0
Our Poland - Independents list	5,472	0.05	0
Radom Popular-Selfgoverning List	5,318	0.05	0
Polish National Community - Polish National Party	5,262	0.05	0
Trade Union of PKP Machinists	5,142	0.05	0
VICTORIA Party	5,000	0.04	0
Handicapped, Retirees and Pensioners	4,955	0.04	0
Citizens' Committees	4,934	0.04	0
Electoral Committee of Selfgoverning Gmina	4,711	0.04	0
Movement of Common Ownership	4,648	0.04	0
Citizens' Agreement with the "S" Delegation	4,501	0.04	0
Independent Farmers "Kłos"	4,190	0.04	0
NSZZ "Solidarność" 80 im.ks.J.Popiełuszki	4,073	0.04	0
Nonpartisan List of Radom Voivodeship Gmina	4,003	0.04	0
Polish Union of Pensioners and the Handicapped in Legnica	3,958	0.04	0
Association of Catholic Families	3,939	0.04	0
Nonpartisan List of Independents	3,763	0.03	0
Trade Unions in the Defence of Society	3,759	0.03	0
Agreement of Citizens' Committees	3,611	0.03	0
Polish Party of the Homeless	3,491	0.03	0
Movement in the Defence of Selfgovernance	3,354	0.03	0
Provincial Farmers' Self-Defence Committee	3,247	0.03	0
God, Honor, Fatherland	3,195	0.03	0
Voters of Gmina in Kurpie	3,060	0.03	0
Social Committee for Defending the Rule of Law	3,007	0.03	0
Polish Society of War Veterans	2,910	0.03	0
Polish Popular-Christian Forum "Patrimony" (Note: Majority of party contested as part of Center Civic Alliance, only ran independently in Rzeszów Voivodeship)	2,902	0.03	0
Lesser Polish Independent Electoral Committee	2,786	0.02	0
Wrocław Beyond Divisions	2,743	0.02	0
Wielkopolan Union	2,718	0.02	0
Regional Movement of Citizens' Committees in Zawiercie	2,684	0.02	0
Independent Entrepreneurship List	2,632	0.02	0
Conservative-Liberal Party	2,578	0.02	0
Selfgoverning Electoral Committee	2,361	0.02	0
Craftsmanship	2,261	0.02	0
National Electoral Committee	2,102	0.02	0
Association 2000	2,044	0.02	0
Polish Nursing Society	1,934	0.02	0
Northeastern Farming Association	1,928	0.02	0
Alliance of Women Against the Hardships of Life (Note: Regional electoral list of the Confederation of Independent Poland in Kraków Voivodeship.)	1,922	0.02	1
Bloc of Industry and Technical Circles	1,914	0.02	0
Polish Prosperity Party	1,892	0.02	0
National-Liberal Movement	1,818	0.02	0
Mazowsze Electoral Union	1,793	0.02	0
Social Justice Party	1,792	0.02	0
Movement "Rescue for Zagłębie"	1,658	0.01	0
Labour Movement Independents (Note: List 68)	1,609	0.01	0
Social-Military Voters' Forum "Baszta"	1,475	0.01	0
Polski Związek Działkowców	1,464	0.01	0
Independent Electoral Committee of Wielkopolan Women 91	1,345	0.01	0
Labour Movement Independents (Note: List 67)	1,329	0.01	0
Self-Governance	1,119	0.01	0
Group of Independent Candidates	1,075	0.01	0
Independents '91	1,048	0.01	0
"Give Us a Chance"	1,000	0.01	0
New Poland Movement	967	0.01	0
Polish Independence Party	831	0.01	0
Electoral Committee of PKPS Workers	696	0.01	0
Independent Social Association "WIS"	694	0.01	0
Firefighters' Social Electoral Committee	671	0.01	0
Electoral Committee Polish Charity Society	608	0.01	0
Total	11,218,602	100.00	460
Valid votes	11,218,602	94.37	
Invalid/blank votes	669,347	5.63	
Total votes	11,887,949	100.00	
Registered voters/turnout	27,517,280	43.20	
Source: National Electoral Commission

==== By constituency ====
No.	Constituency	Total seats	Seats won											
No.	Constituency	Total seats	UD	SLD	WAK	PSL	KPN	POC	KLD	PL	KO "S"	PPPP	KWMN	Others
1	Warsaw I	17	3	2	1		1	3	3			1		3
2	Warsaw II	8	1	1	1	1	1	2	1					
3	Płock	10	1	1	1	2	1	1	1	1	1			
4	Łódź	12	2	2	2	1	1	1	1		1	1		
5	Piotrków Trybunalski	7	1	1	1	1	1		1	1				
6	Konin	9	1	1	1	2	1	1		1	1			
7	Radom	8	1	1	2	1	1	1		1				
8	Kielce	11	1	2	1	2	1	1	1	1	1			
9	Częstochowa	8	1	1	1	1	1	1	1				1	
10	Opole	10	1	1	1	1	1	1	1				3	
11	Wroclaw	12	3	2	1	1	1	1	1		1	1		
12	Wałbrzych	8	1	1	1	1	1	1	1			1		
13	Jelenia Góra	11	2	2	1	1	1	1	1		1	1		
14	Zielona Góra	11	1	2	1	2	1	1	1			1		1
15	Kalisz	7	1	1	1	1	1			1	1			
16	Toruń	11	1	2	1	1	1	1	1	1				2
17	Bydgoszcz	11	1	2	1		1	1	1	1	1			2
18	Poznań	14	2	2	1	1	1	1	1		1	1		3
19	Gorzów Wielkopolski	10	1	2	1	1	1	1		1	1			1
20	Szczecin	10	2	1	1	1	1		1	1	1			1
21	Koszalin	9	1	1		1		1	1		1			3
22	Gdańsk	15	2	1	2	1	1	1	3	1	2	1		
23	Olsztyn	13	2	2	1	2	1	1	1		1	1		1
24	Ostrołęka	12	1	1	3	2	1	1		2				1
25	Białystok	12	1	2	2	1	1	1	1	1				2
26	Siedlce	10	1	1	1	2	1	1		3				
27	Zamość	7	1	1	1	1	1	1		1				
28	Lublin	10	1	1	1	1	2	1	1	1	1			
29	Rzeszów	13	1	1	2	2	1	1		2	1			2
30	Przemyśl	9	1	1	1	2	1	1		1	1			
31	Tarnów	7	1	1	1		1	1						2
32	Nowy Sącz	7	1		1	1	1	1		1				1
33	Kraków	13	3	1	1	1	2	1	1					3
34	Bielsko-Biała	9	1	1	1	1		1	1		1	1		1
35	Sosnowiec	10	1	2		1	2	1	1		1	1		
36	Katowice	17	2	2	1		1	1	2		2	1	1	4
37	Gliwice	13	2	1	1		1	1	1		1	1	1	3
National list		69	11	10	7	7	8	7	6	5	4	3	1	
Total		460	62	60	49	48	46	44	37	28	27	16	7	36
Source: National Electoral Commission

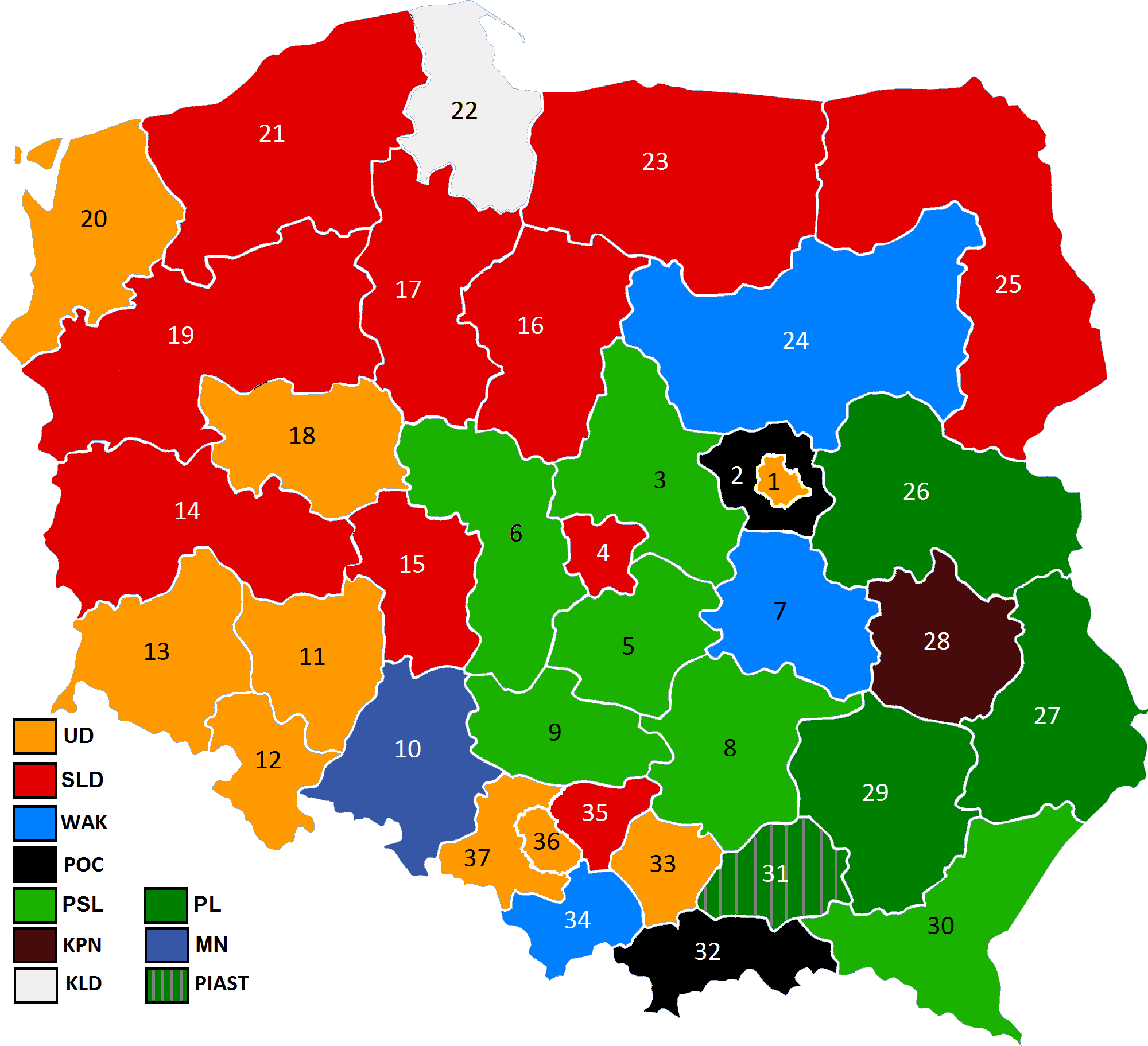
Voivodeships with winning majority.

Results of the Sejm election, showing vote strength by electoral district.

=== Senate ===
Party	Votes	%	Seats
Democratic Union	3,764,156	16.42	21
Democratic Left Alliance	2,431,178	10.61	4
Solidarity	2,219,160	9.68	11
Centre Civic Alliance	2,071,045	9.04	9
Catholic Electoral Action	1,995,866	8.71	9
Polish People's Party	1,691,566	7.38	7
Liberal Democratic Congress	1,497,718	6.53	6
Confederation of Independent Poland	1,071,364	4.67	4
Peasants' Agreement	719,778	3.14	5
Party of Christian Democrats	507,722	2.22	3
Democratic Party	453,721	1.98	0
Party X	417,857	1.82	0
Real Politics Union	371,891	1.62	0
Local lists and independents	3,708,344	16.18	21
Total	22,921,366	100.00	100
Valid votes	11,474,846	96.53	
Invalid/blank votes	413,019	3.47	
Total votes	11,887,865	100.00	
Registered voters/turnout	27,517,280	43.20	
Source: Nohlen & Stöver

==== By voivodeship ====
Voivodeship	Total seats	Seats won										
Voivodeship	Total seats	UD	KO "S"	POC	WAK	PSL	KLD	PL	SLD	KPN	PChD	Others
Biała Podlaska	2					1	1					
Białystok	2			1								1
Bielsko	2		1		1							
Bydgoszcz	2		1				1					
Chełm	2		1			1						
Ciechanów	2					1						1
Częstochowa	2								1	1		
Elbląg	2	1							1			
Gdańsk	2		1									1
Gorzów	2	1			1							
Jelenia Góra	2	1					1					
Kalisz	2	2										
Katowice	3		1	1						1		
Kielce	2	1		1								
Konin	2					1						1
Koszalin	2	1										1
Kraków	2	1	1									
Krosno	2			1				1				
Legnica	2	1		1								
Leszno	2	1										1
Lublin	2		1							1		
Łomża	2				2							
Łódź	2				1							1
Nowy Sącz	2		1								1	
Olsztyn	2	1					1					
Opole	2	1										1
Ostrołęka	2				1			1				
Piła	2											2
Piotrków	2				1							1
Płock	2					1						1
Poznań	2	1					1					
Przemyśl	2			1						1		
Radom	2		1		1							
Rzeszów	2							1				1
Siedlce	2							2				
Sieradz	2					1						1
Skierniewice	2					1		1				
Słupsk	2	1				1						
Suwałki	2				1		1					
Szczecin	2	1	1									
Tarnobrzeg	2		1									1
Tarnów	2										1	1
Toruń	2	1		1								
Wałbrzych	2	2										
Warsaw	3	2		1								
Włocławek	2								2			
Wrocław	2	1		1								
Zamość	2							1				1
Zielona Góra	2										1	1
Total	100	21	11	9	9	8	6	7	4	4	3	18
Source: National Electoral Commission
