= Olszewski cabinet =

Government of Poland

Cabinet of Jan Olszewski
- 3rd Cabinet of Poland
- 1991–1992
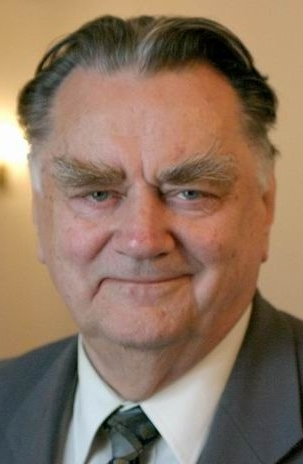
- Prime minister Jan Olszewski (2007)
- Date formed: 6 December 1991
- Date dissolved: 5 June 1992

People and organisations
- President: Lech Wałęsa
- Prime Minister: Jan Olszewski
- Member parties: Centre Agreement; Christian-Peasant Party; Christian National Union; Peasants' Agreement
- Status in legislature: Minority (coalition)
- Opposition party: Democratic Left Alliance; Polish People's Party; Confederation of Independent Poland; Real Politics Union; Movement for the Republic; Labour Solidarity; Democratic Union; Liberal Democratic Congress; Polish Economic Program

History
- Outgoing election: 1991
- Legislature terms: 1st Sejm (1991–1993); 2nd Senate
- Predecessor: Bielecki cabinet
- Successor: First Pawlak government

Cabinet of Jan Olszewski was the government of Poland from 23 December 1991 to 5 June 1992, sitting in the Council of Ministers during the 1st legislature of the Sejm. Led by lawyer Jan Olszewski, it was supported by the coalition of the Centre Agreement and the Christian National Union as well as the Party of Christian Democrats in the beginning and the Peasants' Agreement at the end.

== Government formation ==
In autumn, first fully free elections were held. President Lech Wałęsa invited Jan Olszewski to form a government, when formation of government by Bronisław Geremek and attempts to keep Jan Krzysztof Bielecki in office were unsuccessful. The Sejm appointed Olszewski Prime Minister on 6 December. Issues with forming a coalition discouraged Olszewski, who announced his resignation, which was not accepted. Olszewski was supported by Polish People's Party (in exchange for few deputy ministers), whom Jarosław Kaczyński loudly thanked after the voting. After long period of negotiations, on 23 December the government was formed thanks to support of Solidarity and PSL. The government was made up of 4 parties - Centre Agreement and the Christian National Union as well as the Party of Christian Democrats.

Olszewski cabinet worked under new international conditions. At the end of December 1991, the Soviet Union was dissolved. This motivated the government to start integration with NATO and European Community. For the first time, in official documents, it was mentioned that membership in NATO is part of Polish defence strategies. Negotiations to withdraw Russian armies from Poland started at the end of October 1990, we speeded up. In March 1992, period of confusion occurred when president Lech Wałęsa presented his conception of new economic and military alliance with former Warsaw Pact during his visit to Germany, which went against the euroatlantic direction of the government.

Olszewski government changed the concept of privatization of national corporations. Total stop of privatization led to open conflict with liberal groups in the parliament.

On 22 May 1992, Jan Olszewski opposed signing of a clause in Polish-Russian Treaty of Friendly and Neighbourly Cooperation, which handed over former Russian military bases to international Polish-Russian corporations. The Prime Minister sent a telegram to Moscow to president Lech Wałęsa informing of government opposition to the clause. Wałęsa, after conversation with Boris Yeltsin changed the controversial clause. However, this did not stop further clashes with the president.

== Dissolution ==
Jan Olszewski cabinet did not hold permanent parliamentary majority. Attempts to extend the coalition, first to Democratic Union, Liberal Democratic Congress and Polish Economic Programme, and then to Confederation of Independent Poland, were unsuccessful. On 24 May 1992, the council of the Democratic Union wrote a report calling the government to resign. On 26 May, Wałęsa sent a formal note to the Marshal of the Sejm, informing of withdrawal of support for the government. On 27 May, the four parties prepared for the vote of no confidence against the government. The following day, the Sejm passed a resolution obligating the Minister of Interior (at the time Antoni Macierewicz), to publish the list of communist secret police collaborators. On 29 May, representative of the Democratic Union, Jan Maria Rokita, presented a vote of no confidence request on the behalf of 65 members of the parliament of the 3 parties. On 2 June, the final day of coalition negotiations with the Confederation of Independent Poland, Macierewicz met with deputy Marshal of that party, informing him that its leader, Leszek Moczulski, was on the list of collaborators which will be presented to the Sejm the following day.

The cabinet was recalled by the Sejm in a voting after the midnight of 5 June 1992, few hours after publishing the list. The Prime Minister supported the decision of Macierewicz, proposing to establish an independent commission to verify the validity of the published documents. The Sejm did not debate this proposal. Wałęsa pressured on the Sejm to speed up the vote of no confidence, sending his own request.
