= Andrzej Gąsienica-Makowski =

Polish politician

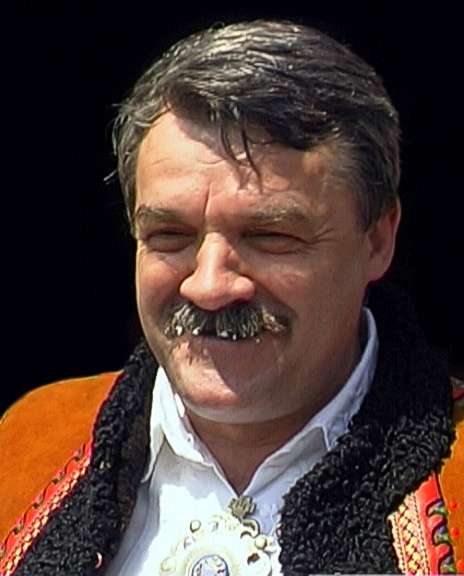

Member of the Second Term Sejm
- In office 1993–1997

Member of the First Term Sejm
- In office 1991–1993

Personal details
- Born: 15 February 1952 (age 74) Zakopane, Polish People's Republic
- Party: Nonpartisan Bloc for Support of Reforms; Bloc for Poland
- Education: Kraków University of Technology
- Awards: Order of Polonia Restituta; Cross of Merit

Andrzej Tadeusz Gąsienica-Mąkowski (born February 15, 1952, in Zakopane) is a Polish Goral politician and poet who led the Nonpartisan Bloc for Support of Reforms in 1993. He led the party in the 1993 Polish parliamentary election where the party won 16 seats. He also served as mayor of Tatra country.

He graduated from the Tadeusz Kościuszko Kraków University of Technology Faculty of Mechanical Engineering, he went on to work as a teacher. He was a member of parliament of a term from the list of the Gorals and the second term from the list Nonpartisan Bloc for Support of Reforms. He was reelection in the parliamentary elections in 1997 (received 12 918 votes). Since 1998, he has continued as a councilor, and later governor of the Tatra County, re-elected to both of these offices in 2006 and 2010. In 1996–2002 he headed the Union of the Highlanders. He is the leader of a local group Unity of Tatra. He joined the Christian Movement for Self-Government, he served as deputy chief of the council.
