= Catholic Electoral Action =

Catholic Electoral Action Wyborcza Akcja Katolicka
- Abbreviation: WAK
- Founded: October 1990
- Dissolved: November 1991
- Headquarters: Warsaw, Poland
- Ideology: Conservatism; Pro-Europeanism
- Political position: Right-wing
- Religion: Catholicism
- Members: Christian National Union; Union of Catholic Laity; Christian Civic Movement; Federation of Kresy Organisations; Citizens' Committees
- Colours: Blue; Black

The Catholic Electoral Action (Polish: Wyborcza Akcja Katolicka, WAK), was a Polish electoral committee that participated in the 1991 parliamentary election. The committee was formed in October 1990 and consisted of 20 various groupings that split from Solidarity. The committee's members belonged to the Christian National Union. Led by Wiesław Chrzanowski, the WAK won 49 seats in the Sejm and 9 seats in Senat during the 1991 poll. The committee received relatively strong support in rural areas. Following the election's conclusion, the Christian National Union disbanded its nom de guerre Catholic Electoral Action, sitting in parliament under the party's actual name.

The coalition saw the Catholic Church as a source of the Polish nation and identity and sought to make Poland an explicitly Catholic nation and state. It opposed communist influences prevalent in the country. Despite presenting itself as a confessional party inspired by Catholicism, the coalition was strongly supportive of a free-market economy and had a pro-US orientation, which ran contrary to the views and statements of the Polish Catholic Church.

== History ==
The coalition was founded at the initiative of Christian National Union, a party founded in October 1989. The WAK was a merger of almost 20 small groups from the Polish trade union Solidarity and other patriotic movements, and was founded in October 1990. The main purpose of the coalition was to unite Polish parties that stood for "an appropriate position for the Catholic Church in public life".

The WAK was a coalition of five parties and political associations: Christian National Union (Polish: Zjednoczenie Chrześcijańsko-Narodowe), Union of Catholic Laity (Polish: Unia Laikatu Katolickiego), Christian Civic Movement (Polish: Chrześcijański Ruch Obywatelski), Federation of Kresy Organizations (Polish: Federacja Organizacji Kresowych) and Citizens' Committees (Polish: Komitety Obywatelskie), out of which only the Christian National Union continued political activities after 1991. The Christian National Union was also the dominating force in the coalition.

The WAK was formed by lay Catholics, but under the aegis of parish priest Bogusław Bijak. The name of the committee was a clear signal to the public of the hierarchical Church's approval of this electoral initiative, although it is not known whether it was officially approved by the Church. No organisation is allowed to use the word 'Catholic' in its name without the express approval of the ecclesiastical authority. However, the fact that the local bishop, i.e. Primate Cardinal Józef Glemp, had given such approval was never publicly confirmed or denied.

The coalition made use of church infrastructure during the campaign, and stylized itself as a confessional party and attempting to claim the official support of the Polish Church. While there was never an official endorsement of the WAK by the Church, the coalition nevertheless made it seem like it was given official backing by the clergy. Particularly important was a statement made by a Polish bishop Józef Michalik that the coalition extensively cited in its campaign; Michalik recommended that "a Catholic has a duty to vote for a Catholic, a Christian for a Christian, a Muslim for a Muslim, a Jew for a Jew, a Freemason for a Freemason, a Communist for a Communist."

In the 1991 election, the coalition emerged as the third largest parliamentary grouping, securing 8.79% of the vote and 49 deputies in the Sejm. In the Senate, the coalition won 9 seats, which meant 58 mandates in total. This was considered a disappointing result by the backers of the coalition, and was also alarming to the Polish Church given how the WAK openly sought its endorsement. From then on, the Church was more cautious regarding its political statements.

The coalition was spectacularly successful in Podlasie and Kurpie - in the Łomża Voivodeship it received 34.8% of the popular vote. Here, too, in the municipality of Brok, the coalition received as much as 56.6% of the vote. WAK also won the elections in the provinces of Ostrołęka (22.4%), Radom (17.2%) and Bielsko-Biała (14%). It received several percent of the vote each in the other provinces of north-eastern Poland, parts of Galicia and the provinces of Gorzów Voivodeship, Zielona Góra and Leszno, and to a lesser extent Jelenia Góra and Wałbrzych.

Some WAK influence was also apparent in the Kashubian region. In the Białystok region, the list's area of popularity was quite clearly bounded on the eastern side by the already mentioned border line between Catholic and Orthodox areas. To the north, the WAK support was bordered extremely clearly by the former border of East Prussia. In the south, the area of WAK support stopped at the Bug River line, while in the west it did not essentially reach the borders of Ciechanów province. The fewest votes for the WAK were cast in (culturally separate from Poland) Upper Silesia and parts of the Congress Kingdom (Płock, Kielce) and in central Pomerania (Koszalin).

Running from the WAK list, ZChN chairman Wiesław Chrzanowski served as Speaker of the Sejm of the Republic of Poland during the first term of office. At that time, WAK deputies were part of government coalitions, co-founding the cabinets of Jan Olszewski (1991–1992) and Hanna Suchocka (1992–1993). During their time in the office, the deputies of the WAK became particularly known for their efforts to push for a total ban on abortion.

In the 1993 Polish parliamentary election, the Christian National Union formed a similar coalition known as the Catholic Electoral Committee "Fatherland". The Polish Church emphasized that it did not endorse any party and asked Polish Catholics to vote with their conscience. The Catholic Electoral Committee nevertheless tried to work through Catholic organisation, and sough grassroots support in parishes and lay Catholic organisations. It won 6.37% of the popular vote, but won no seats, as after the 1991 election Sejm implemented an electoral threshold - 5% for political parties and 8% for electoral coalitions. The Catholic Electoral Committee counted as the latter.

== Ideology ==
The Catholic Electoral Action was described as a staunchly right-wing coalition, and was described as Catholic-nationalist. It attempted to tie itself to the Catholic Church and its teachings, and argued that public policy must be rooted in Catholicism and notions of "social solidarity". The coalition was not considered an example of Christian democracy, with Polish political scientist Dominika Sozańska noting that the WAK was not only strongly ethno-nationalist, but also insisted on a "purely" Catholic national order instead of a synthesis of Christian and democratic values. In its program, WAK argued that Catholicism is the essence and overarching feature of Polish nation and culture, promoting the cultural concept of "Pole = Catholic". The coalition argued that Catholic social teaching is the basis of maintaining social strength and identity, and called the religion "the source of the Polish nation and state".

The WAK postulated a "Catholic social order" in Poland. Elaborating on this concept, the coalition wrote:

The social order understood in a Catholic way is the order of love. Everyone is a neighbour, but we have special duties towards our own family, then towards the nation as a family of families, then towards humanity. The Christian state should ensure freedom for man, for families the conditions of development and the right to bring up children in accordance with the professed values, for the nation - security. A Catholic Poland should be a state of justice and solidarity transcending group interests.

In its program declaration, the WAK emphasised the role and importance of rebuilding national culture and public morality, proposing the restoration of "principles of social discipline, honesty, individual and group solidity". It stated that "this was how the generation of independent Poland, the generation of the Warsaw Uprising, which had survived communism and passed on Christian and national values to us, had been brought up". In the coalition's view, it was necessary to foster social initiatives supporting the development of national culture through the law on foundations and tax policy, and in turn to oppose the spread of evil and violence in the social media. It demanded a return in school curricula and mass media to the values that had shaped the civic sense of Poles, a change in school textbooks and a reorientation of teachers.

The WAK emphasised that Catholic and national principles must constitute the foundation of an independent Polish state, the reconstruction of which after the period of the People's Republic of Poland was considered the main challenge for Polish society, according to the coalition. The coalition defined the Polish nation as "a family of families" and stated that it should be protected from 'materialist' and communist influences. The coalition also sought a change in school textbooks and a reorientation of teachers, especially in the context of teaching Polish language, history or social sciences. It was also stated with concern that in Poland at the turn of the 1980s and 1990s attempts were being made to eliminate the church and religion from public life. The coalition also argued that Poland must be a unitary state and opposed all provisions and legal provisions that could "enable separatism".

WAK also formulated the demand to recover national assets that had been illegally appropriated by both political and economic structures originating from the former communist rule. In addition, there was an emphasis on bringing consequences to those guilty of crimes against the Polish nation. The need for necessary personnel and structural changes in institutions such as the police and special services was also pointed out. It was stressed, however, that the above-mentioned demands were not dictated by a desire for retaliation, but by the need to restore an individual, social and national sense of security in a state in which citizens should feel themselves to be the hosts. The coalition also wrote about the need to decommunify structures of importance to the state, as well as to try those guilty of crimes against the Polish nation. The functionaries of the former secret services were to be deprived of pension and disability benefits.

In regards to foreign policy, WAK strongly emphasised the need for Poland's integration into Western structures. It called for the fastest possible incorporation of the Republic of Poland into the pan-European security system, while emphasising the need to remove stationed Soviet troops from the country's territory. Poland's main foreign partners in the region were considered to be Hungary and Czechoslovakia, with whom it was declared that economic, military and political cooperation would be strengthened. The declaration also included acceptance of the national (or independence) aspirations of Lithuania, Belarus and Ukraine. However, the obligation to protect and support the Polish population living in the mentioned territories was highlighted.

The coalition also emphasized the need to develop and maintain good and very close relations with the United States, with the coalition regarding the US as a vanguard of "stability and security on the European continent". This strongly pro-American and pro-European stance ran contrary to other Catholic groupings and the remarks of Polish Catholic clergy itself, which argued for an independent foreign policy, warning that Poland should avoid alienating Russia and beware of Western domination of Polish markets.

On economical matters, the WAK put forward a postulate based on free market economy and strongly supported private ownership, although it proposed regulations such as protection for domestic industries and agriculture, and welfare measures which would allow women to not participate in labor force and be given a state pension as homemakers, if they wished so. The free-market approach of the coalition contradicted its Catholic-nationalist reputation, especially in the wake of statements made by Pope John Paul II, who stated that the entire Catholic tradition is "in clear opposition to capitalism as a socioeconomic system as well as a general system of values", condemning it as a system that "enables the powerful to exploit the weak, hiding their often brutal egoism behind so-called iron laws of economics" and asserting that it is the "living opposite of the Gospel" and an "unethical form of exploitation of the natural law of ownership". Despite this, the party also had an anti-capitalist appeal, according to political scientist Stanisław Kozyr-Kowalski:

It is worth noting that WAK was treated by part of voters as a party of protest, as a defender of the Catholic Polish nation against rapacious and thus "godless," capitalism, since during the campaign WAK did not foreswear social criticism. Is it by accident that WAK received 30% of its votes from pensioners, peasants, and blue-collar workers?

== Electoral results ==
=== Sejm ===
Election year	# of votes	% of vote	# of overall seats won	Government
1991	980,304	8.74 (#3)	49 / 460	Olszewski cabinet

=== Senate ===
Election year	# of votes	% of vote	# of overall seats won	Government
1991	980,304	8.74 (#5)	9 / 100	Olszewski cabinet
