= Leszek Moczulski =

Polish historian and politician (1930–2024)

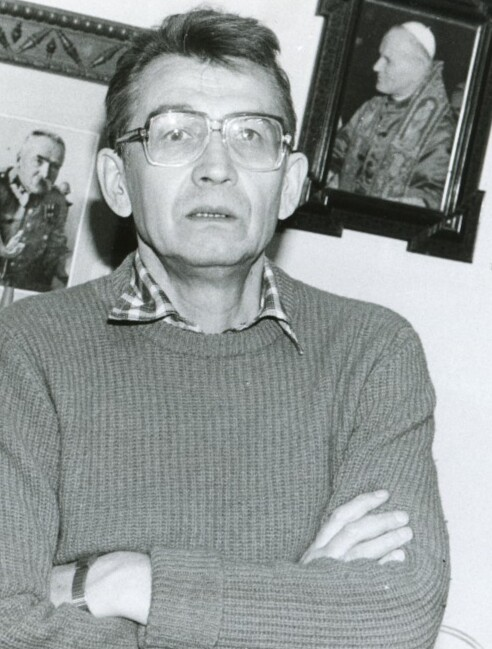
- Moczulski in c. 1979

Member of Sejm
- In office 14 October 1993 – 19 October 1997

Personal details
- Born: 7 June 1930 Warsaw, Poland
- Died: 10 October 2024 (aged 94) Warsaw, Poland
- Party: Confederation of Independent Poland

Robert Leszek Moczulski (Polish pronunciation: [ˈlɛʂɛk mɔˈtʂulskʲi], 7 June 1930 – 10 October 2024) was a Polish historian and politician, a member of various organizations, first supporting then supposedly opposing the communist regime in the People's Republic of Poland while dividing the opposition movement.

== Early life ==
Leszek Moczulski was born on 7 June 1930 in Warsaw. Shortly after the Second World War and the Communist take-over of power in Poland, Moczulski became involved in various communist organizations. In 1947 he became a member of the Association of Fighting Youth and the following year he became the member of the Polish Workers' Party and the ZMP youth organization. Then from 1950 young Moczulski was a member of the Polish United Workers' Party (PUWP).

In 1951 he graduated from the Academy of Political Studies, a school of cadres for the communist regime. The following year he graduated also from the faculties of Law and Journalism at the Warsaw University. He completed his education in 1958 by graduating from the faculty of history at the same university. About that time he started to work as a journalist for various Warsaw-based newspapers and weeklies, among them the Życie Warszawy, Dookoła Świata and Stolica weekly.

== Career ==
As a historian, Moczulski focused mostly on modern history of Poland, including the history of the Polish Defensive War.

Initially, according to the Polish lustration court, a secret informer of the Służba Bezpieczeństwa secret political police, in late 1970s Moczulski most probably broke up (or just the opposite) with the regime and started working for various anti-communist associations. He was one of the inspirers of the creation and the spokesperson of the Movement for Defense of Human and Civic Rights. Conflicted with the rest of the members, he tried to break it up by forming a ZINO faction, which was however unsuccessful. Finally, on 1 September 1979 Moczulski announced the creation of the Confederation of Independent Poland.

As a politician, Moczulski referred to the rightist wing of the pre-war Sanacja and the supporters of Józef Piłsudski. In his political works he focused mostly on the economic aspect of the possible transformation of Communist planned economy into free market economy. Among the most notable of his actions of the 1980s was a memorandum of February 1985, in which he urged the governments of United Kingdom and the United States to fulfill the promises of the Yalta Conference of 1945 and organise free elections in Poland. For such actions, Moczulski was arrested several times and held in prisons as a political prisoner.

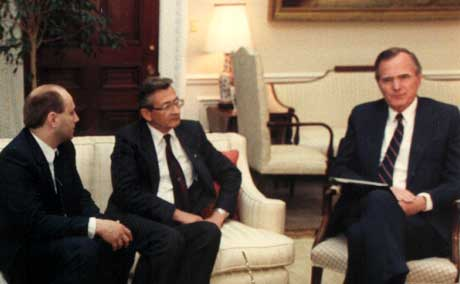
Moczulski with then-U.S. Vice President George H. W. Bush at the White House in 1987

After the Round Table Talks and the peaceful transfer of power from the communist regime to the democratic authorities, Moczulski distanced himself from the agreement and openly criticised the idea of gruba kreska, instead supporting an idea of decommunization, a concept coined after the post-World War II de-nazification of Nazi Germany. He also stayed off the Solidarity movement. He failed to gain enough support in the Kraków-Podgórze constituency for his candidacy to the Sejm in the Contract elections of 1989. The following year he took part in the presidential elections scoring 2.50% of votes. In the Polish parliamentary elections of 1991 he became a member of the parliament. He held his post in the elections of 1993. During his membership, he was a president of various commissions, including the commissions responsible for foreign policies, for support of Polonia, as well as the commission working on the project of the new constitution.

Moczulski also took part in the presidential election of 1995, though he withdrew his candidacy. In 1992, during the last days of the government of Jan Olszewski, Moczulski was accused by Antoni Macierewicz of being one of the secret agents of the Służba Bezpieczeństwa (SB), the Polish secret police. In 1997, after the Lustration Act took place, Moczulski himself asked the lustration tribunal to investigate the matter. However, contrary to his official stance, he was found guilty of hiding his collaboration with the SB during the period 1969-1977, which ended his political career.

== Death ==
Moczulski died in Warsaw on 10 October 2024, at the age of 94.

== Note ==
1. According to the Polish Lustration Act, all candidates to the Sejm, Senate or government are to announce whether they collaborated with secret services of the communist regime of Poland. The declaration is then printed on all official lists of candidates.
