= Democratic-Social Movement (Poland) =

Political party in Poland

Democratic-Social Movement Ruch Demokratyczno-Społeczny
- Founded: 20 April 1991
- Dissolved: June 1992
- Split from: Citizens' Movement for Democratic Action
- Merged into: Labour Solidarity
- Membership: 300

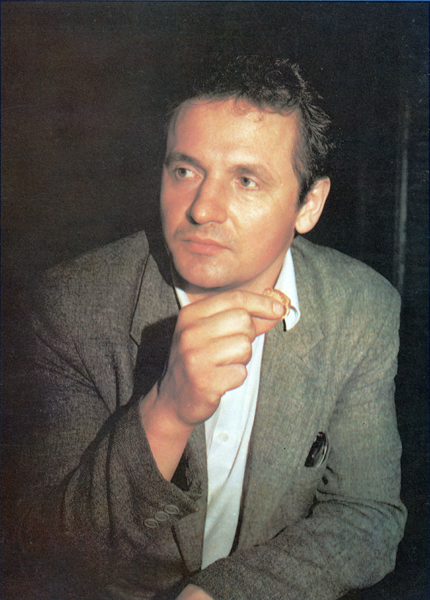
Founder of RDS, Zbigniew Bujak, in 1991

The Democratic-Social Movement (Polish: Ruch Demokratyczno-Społeczny, RDS) was a political party in Poland.

== History ==
The RDS was established on 20 April 1991 by Zbigniew Bujak as a breakaway from the Citizens' Movement for Democratic Action. It went on to receive 0.5% of the vote and win one seat in the Sejm in the October 1991 parliamentary elections.

In June 1992 the party merged with the Polish Social Democratic Union, Labour Solidarity and some members of the Polish Socialist Party to form the party Labour Union.
