= Eugeniusz Czykwin =

Polish politician (born 1949)

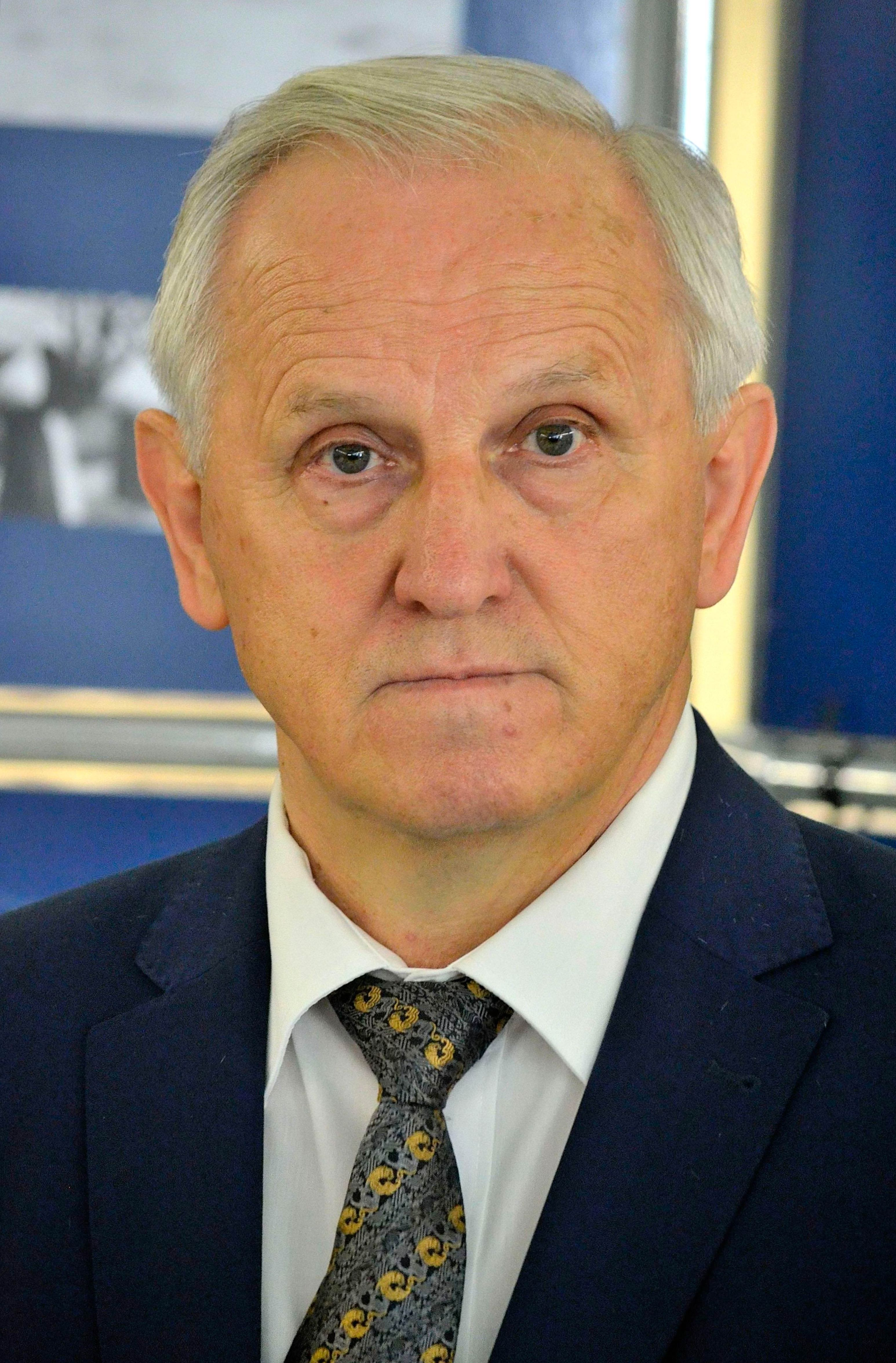

Member of the Sejm
- In office 25 November 1991 – 31 May 1993
- Constituency: 25 – Białystok
- In office 19 October 2001 – 11 November 2015
- In office 12 November 2019 – 12 November 2023
- Constituency: 24 – Białystok

Personal details
- Born: 1949 (age 76–77) Orla, Poland
- Party: Democratic Left Alliance

Eugeniusz Czykwin (Belarusian: Яўген Чыквін, romanized: Jaŭhien Čykvin, born 12 September 1949) is a Polish politician. He was elected to Sejm on 25 September 2005, getting 14181 votes in 24 Białystok district as a candidate from the Democratic Left Alliance list.

He was also a member of PRL Sejm 1985-1989, PRL Sejm 1989-1991, Sejm 1991-1993, Sejm 2001-2005, Sejm 2005-2007, Sejm 2007-2011, Sejm 2011-2015, and Sejm 2019-2023).

Currently, Eugeniusz Czykwin is one of the few representatives of the Belarusian ethnic minority in the Sejm of Poland. Czykwin also serves as the President of the General Assembly of the Interparliamentary Assembly on Orthodoxy.

== See also ==
- Members of Polish Sejm 2005-2007
