= Labour Solidarity =

Polish political party

Labour Solidarity (Polish: Solidarność Pracy, SP) was a political party in Poland.

== History ==
The SP was initially a faction within the Solidarity movement, which coalesced between 1989 and 1991 led by Ryszard Bugaj and Karol Modzelewski. The party's programme was presented at the Solidarity congress in April 1990. Nine members of the Sejm and the Senate joined the new party. It went on to win four seats in the 1991 parliamentary elections.

In June 1992, the party merged with the Polish Social Democratic Union, the Democratic-Social Movement and some members of the Polish Socialist Party to form the Labour Union.
