= Polish Beer-Lovers' Party =

Political party in Poland

Polish Beer-Lovers' Party Polska Partia Przyjaciół Piwa
- Abbreviation: PPPP
- Registered: 28 December 1990
- Dissolved: 28 May 1993
- Headquarters: Warsaw
- Membership (1991): >10,000
- Ideology: Initially: Political satire Beer-drinking advocacy Anti-communism; Later: Reformism; Green politics
- Political position: Big tent

The Polish Beer-Lovers' Party (PPPP; Polish: Polska Partia Przyjaciół Piwa, lit. 'Polish Party of Friends of Beer') was a satirical Polish political party that was founded in 1990. Originally, the party's goal was to promote cultural beer-drinking in English-style pubs instead of vodka (and, thus, fight alcoholism); however, the party eventually developed a serious platform based on tax reform and green politics.

== History ==
=== Formation ===
The party was founded by the cast and crew of a late 80's Polish comedy series called "The Beer Scouts" (Polish: Skauci Piwni) as "a continuation of [the] TV program." Janusz Rewiński, an actor on the show, was elected leader of the party in April 1991. Andrzej Kołodziejski and Adam Halber, two editors for the now defunct magazine Pan, were responsible for most of the party's early promotion.

=== Rise and 1991 election ===
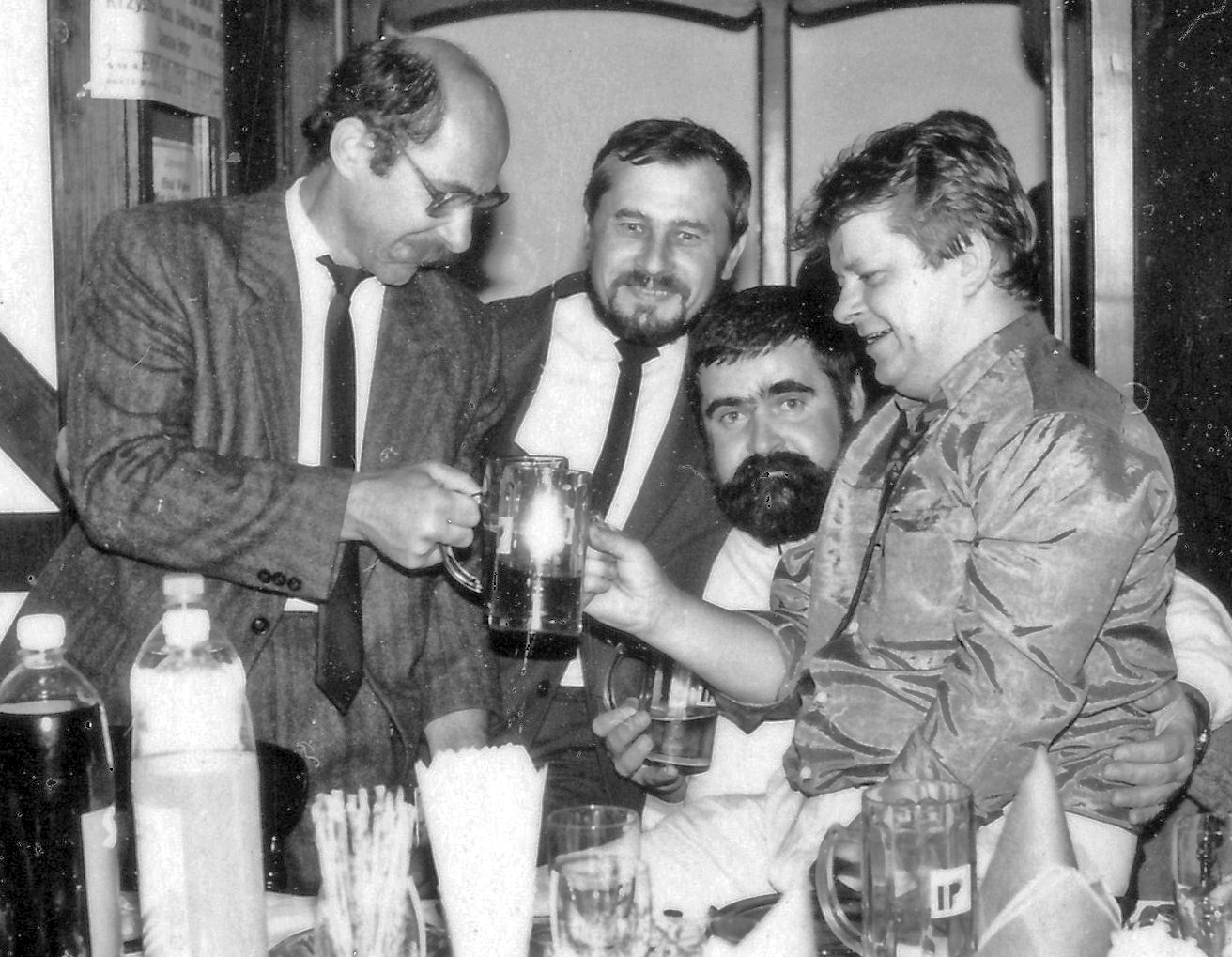
Janusz Rewiński and Leszek Bubel (third and fourth from the left) during a PPPP political convention

The humorous name and disillusionment with Poland's political transformation led some Poles to vote for and/or join the party, with it having 10,000 registered members by July 1991. The nature of the party's appeal to its supporters was reflected in frequently-heard remarks that, maybe with the PPPP at the helm, "it wouldn't be better but for sure it would be funnier."

Although it started as a joke party, its members developed a serious platform with time, such as stopping the domestic sale of leaded gasoline. Moreover, the idea of political discussion in establishments that served quality beer became a symbol of freedom of association and expression, intellectual tolerance, and a higher standard of living.

In the 1991 parliamentary elections, the PPPP won 16 seats in the Sejm, capturing 3.27% of the vote.

=== Disbanding and successor groups ===
Soon after the election, the party split into Big Beer and Little Beer factions, despite Rewiński's claims that "beer is neither light nor dark, it is tasty." Leszek Bubel, future president of the Polish National Party, became leader of the PPPP in 1992 after Rewiński was accused of "cryptic financial operations." The PPPP dissolved in 1993 after it suffered a major defeat in that year's parliamentary election, receiving only 0.1% of the vote.

The Big Beer faction assumed the name Polish Economic Program (PPG; Polish: Polski Program Gospodarczy). Dropping its satirical element, it became associated with the Democratic Union (UD). The Little Beer faction became associated with the Liberal Democratic Congress in a coalition of liberal pro-market parties, which supported the candidacy of Hanna Suchocka as prime minister.

In 2007, there was an unsuccessful attempt to revive the party by activists associated with Bubel.

== See also ==
- Beer Lovers Party (Russia)
- List of political parties in Poland
- List of frivolous parties
- The Beer Party (Austria)
