= Polish Social Democratic Union =

Polish political party

The Polish Social Democratic Union (Polish: Polska Unia Socjaldemokratyczna, PUS) was a social-democratic political party in Poland that existed from 1989 to 1992. It was founded in 1989 under the name Social Democratic Union (Unia Socjaldemokratyczna), under the leadership of Tadeusz Fiszbach with 25 parliamentary deputies, and changed its name in 1990. Along with the Social Democracy of the Republic of Poland, it is one of the successor parties of the Polish United Workers' Party (PZPR). The party itself was succeeded by the Labour Union.
