= Wiesław Chrzanowski =

Polish politician and lawyer (1923–2012)

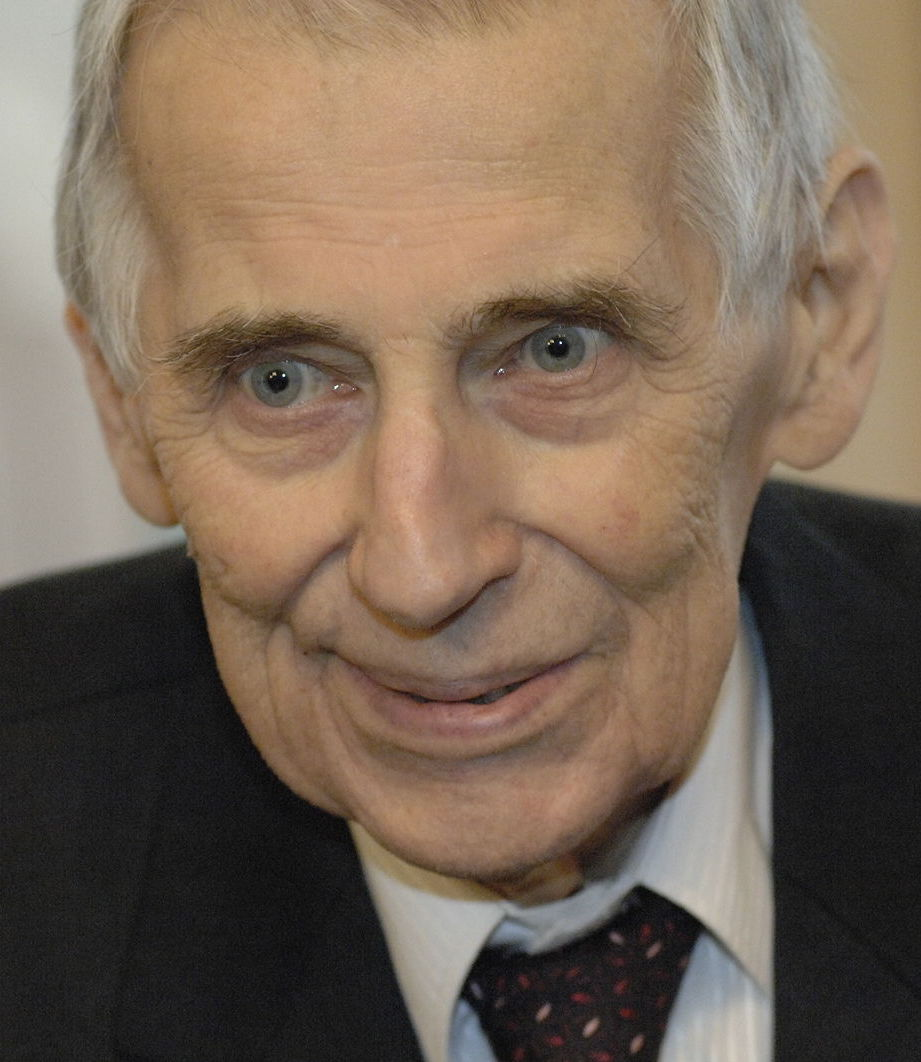

Marshal of the Sejm
- In office 24 November 1991 – 14 October 1993
- Preceded by: Mikołaj Kozakiewicz
- Succeeded by: Józef Oleksy

Minister of Justice Public Prosecutor General
- In office 12 January 1991 – 21 December 1991
- President: Lech Wałęsa
- Prime Minister: Jan Krzysztof Bielecki
- Preceded by: Aleksander Bentkowski
- Succeeded by: Zbigniew Dyka

Personal details
- Born: Wiesław Marian Chrzanowski; 20 December 1923 Warsaw, Second Polish Republic
- Died: 29 April 2012 (aged 88)
- Party: Christian National Union
- Profession: Lawyer

Wiesław Marian Chrzanowski (Polish pronunciation: [ˈvʲɛswaf xʂaˈnɔfskʲi], 20 December 1923 – 29 April 2012) was a Polish politician and lawyer; from 1991 to 1993 he was Marshal of the Sejm. He was a recipient of the Order of the White Eagle.

Chrzanowski was born and died in Warsaw, Poland. During World War II he was a member of the Polish anti-Nazi resistance organization, the Home Army. He finished a law degree at a secret underground university in 1945. During the second half of the 1970s he became associated with the opposition to the communist government in Poland. He helped to draft the statutes establishing the Solidarity trade union and later was the lawyer which guided the legal registration process of the organization. In 1989 he founded the Christian National Union (ZChN), party he chaired to 1994.

During the 2011 Polish parliamentary election, he endorsed Polska jest Najważniejsza.
