= Centre Civic Alliance =

1991 center-right alliance of Polish governing parties

Centre Civic Alliance Porozumienie Obywatelskie Centrum (Polish)
- Members: Centre Agreement; Solidarity Citizens' Committee; Polish Popular-Christian Forum "Patrimony"
- Colors: White; Yellow

The Centre Civic Alliance (Polish: Porozumienie Obywatelskie Centrum), abbreviated as POC, was a center-right electoral alliance of several political parties that participated in the 1991 Polish parliamentary election. The Center Civic Alliance was chiefly organized by the Centre Agreement, drawing in remnants of the Solidarity Citizens' Committees, independents, and Christian right parties, including the Polish Popular-Christian Forum "Patrimony". The alliance was created after its main component, the Centre Agreement, attempted to form a broad alliance supporting President Lech Wałęsa. However, the alliance quickly fell out of favor with the president, failing to gain Wałęsa's approval. In its aftermath, Centre Agreement leader Jarosław Kaczyński was subsequently fired from his position as Chief of the Presidential Chancellery.

For the 1991 elections, the Center Civic Alliance supported a pro-Western foreign policy, advocating membership into NATO, faster privatization, decommunization, and greater economic reforms.

In the election's highly fractious aftermath, the Center Civic Alliance garnered 8.7% of the vote, taking 44 seats in the Sejm. In the Senat, the Alliance took 9 seats. For the coalition building talks that followed, the Alliance selected Jan Olszewski to lead the organization into forming a minority government, forging a coalition with the Peasants' Agreement, the Christian National Union and various independents. However, Olszewski's government proved to be deeply unstable, falling within half a year.

By the 1993 election, the Center Civic Alliance had dissolved, due to its former Centre Agreement core suffering from numerous party defections and splits into new independent groups.
