= Confederation of Independent Poland =

Confederation of Independent Poland Konfederacja Polski Niepodległej
- Leader: Leszek Moczulski (first) Władysław Borowiec (last)
- Founder: Leszek Moczulski
- Founded: 1 September 1979; 2007 (reformed)
- Dissolved: 2003; 2018 (reformed)
- Headquarters: Osiedle Oświecenia 44/44, 31-636 Kraków
- Ideology: Polish nationalism Sanationism; Anti-communism; Anti-neoliberalism
- Political position: Right-wing
- Colours: Red, white
- Sejm: 0 / 460
- Senate: 0 / 100
- European Parliament: 0 / 51
- Politics of Poland; Political parties; Elections; A: The party had also been called economically left-wing.

Confederation of Independent Poland (KPN, Polish: Konfederacja Polski Niepodległej Polish pronunciation: [kɔnfɛdɛˈratsja ˈpɔlskʲi ɲɛpɔˈdlɛɡɫɛj]) was a Polish nationalist political party founded on 1 September 1979 by Leszek Moczulski and others declaring support for the pre-war traditions of Sanacja and Józef Piłsudski.

It was the first independent political party that was publicly proclaimed in the Eastern Bloc, it was however unrecognized by the communist People's Republic of Poland government and its chief activists were arrested several times. It didn't participate in the Polish Roundtable Negotiations with the communists.

== History ==
=== Foundation ===
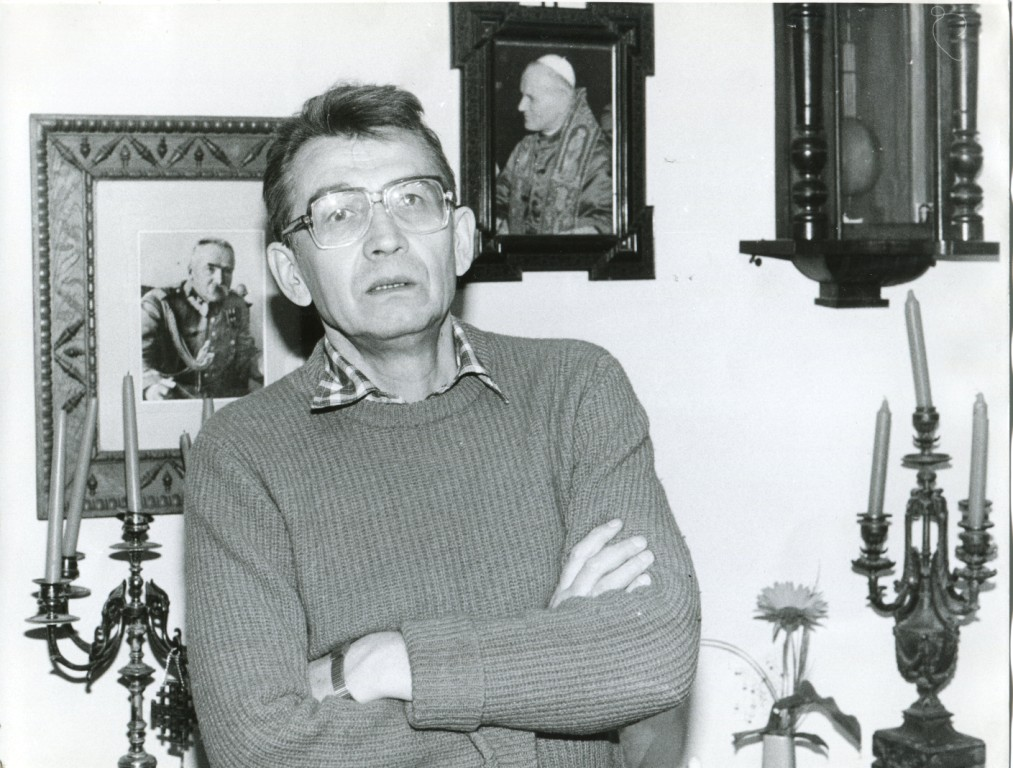
Party leader Leszek Moczulski with images of Pope John Paul II and Józef Piłsudski in the background

After the fragmentation of the anti-communist ROPCiO (Movement for the protection of human and civil rights), former leader Leszek Moczulski began preparing structures for a new organization with other independence activists, most importantly Romuald Szeremietiew and Tadeusz Stański. It was decided that the new organization would be a Confederation (that is how parties in the Polish-Lithuanian Commonwealth were called) of many different groupings of Piłsudskiite and Sanation tradition. This new organization declared continuity with the 1913 Komisja Tymczasowych Skonfederowanych Stronnict Niepodległościowych.

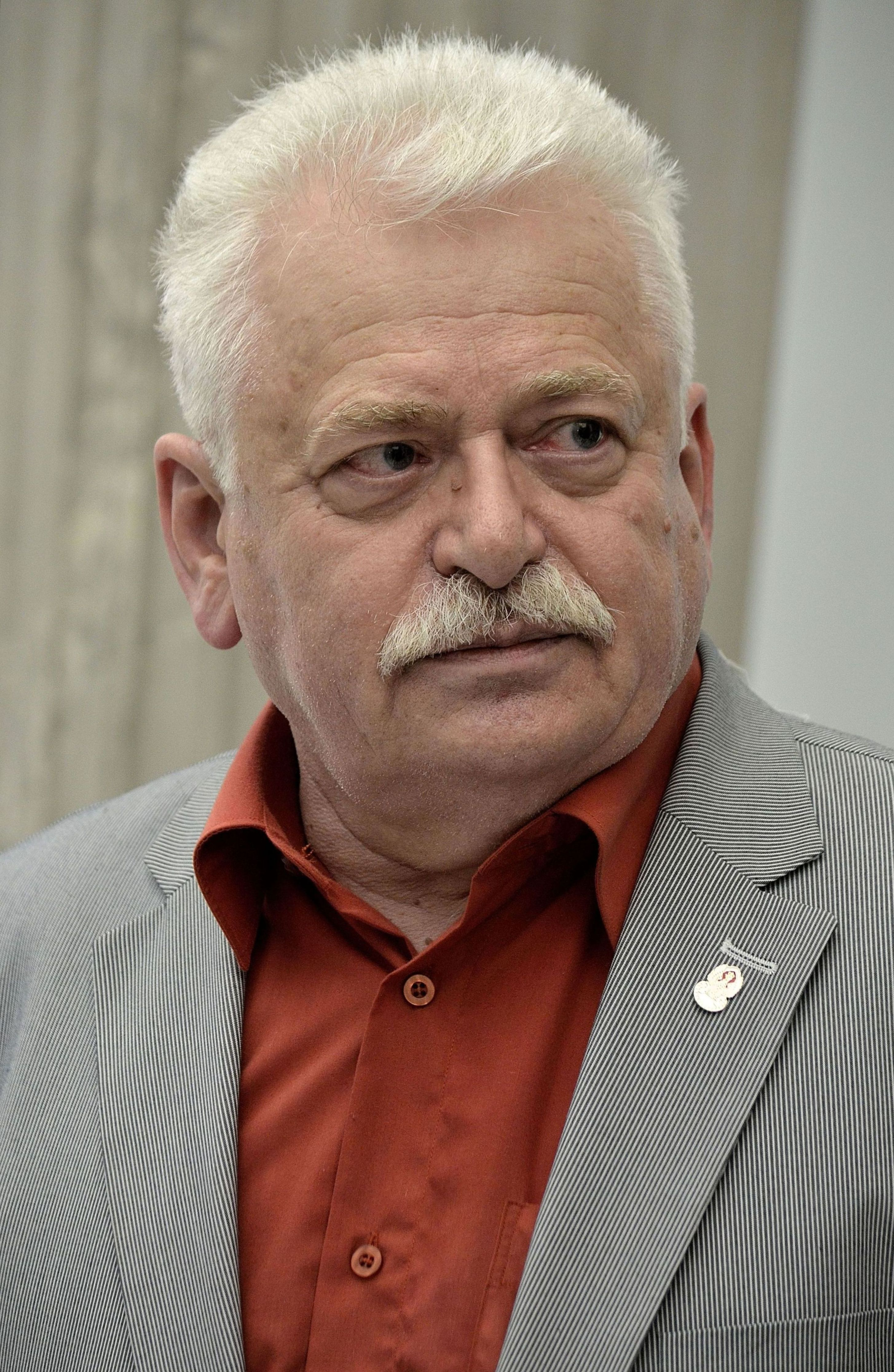
Founding member Romuald Szeremietiew in 2015

Leszek Moczulski wrote the founding document of the new party - A revolution without a revolution, which was a reference to Piłsudski's concept of a "revolution without revolutionary consequences". The party would officially be established on the 40th anniversary of the outbreak of World War 2, on 1 September 1979 during celebrations in front of the ruins of the Saxon Palace, the Tomb of the Unknown Soldier, a symbol of pre-war independent Poland.

The founding "Act of the Confederation of Independent Poland" was signed by 35 founding members of the party. 20 of these founding members were arrested that same day by the communist dictatorship, the other 15 followed in the same week. The party would be the first independent party founded in the communist Eastern Bloc.

On 17 September 1979, Leszek Moczulski was elected the leader of the party, at a meeting in Moczulski's epartment. The meeting was interrupted by the communist Polish Security Service and most of the participants were arrested.

=== Further Development and Opposition ===
With the election of Leszek Moczulski, the KPN had a unique position. It would organize central administrations for each of Poland's regions and set voievodes for each, bearing similarity to the wartime Armia Krajowa. The party newspaper was called "Droga" and was in direct tradition with the pre-war Piłsudskiite newspaper "Gazeta Polska".

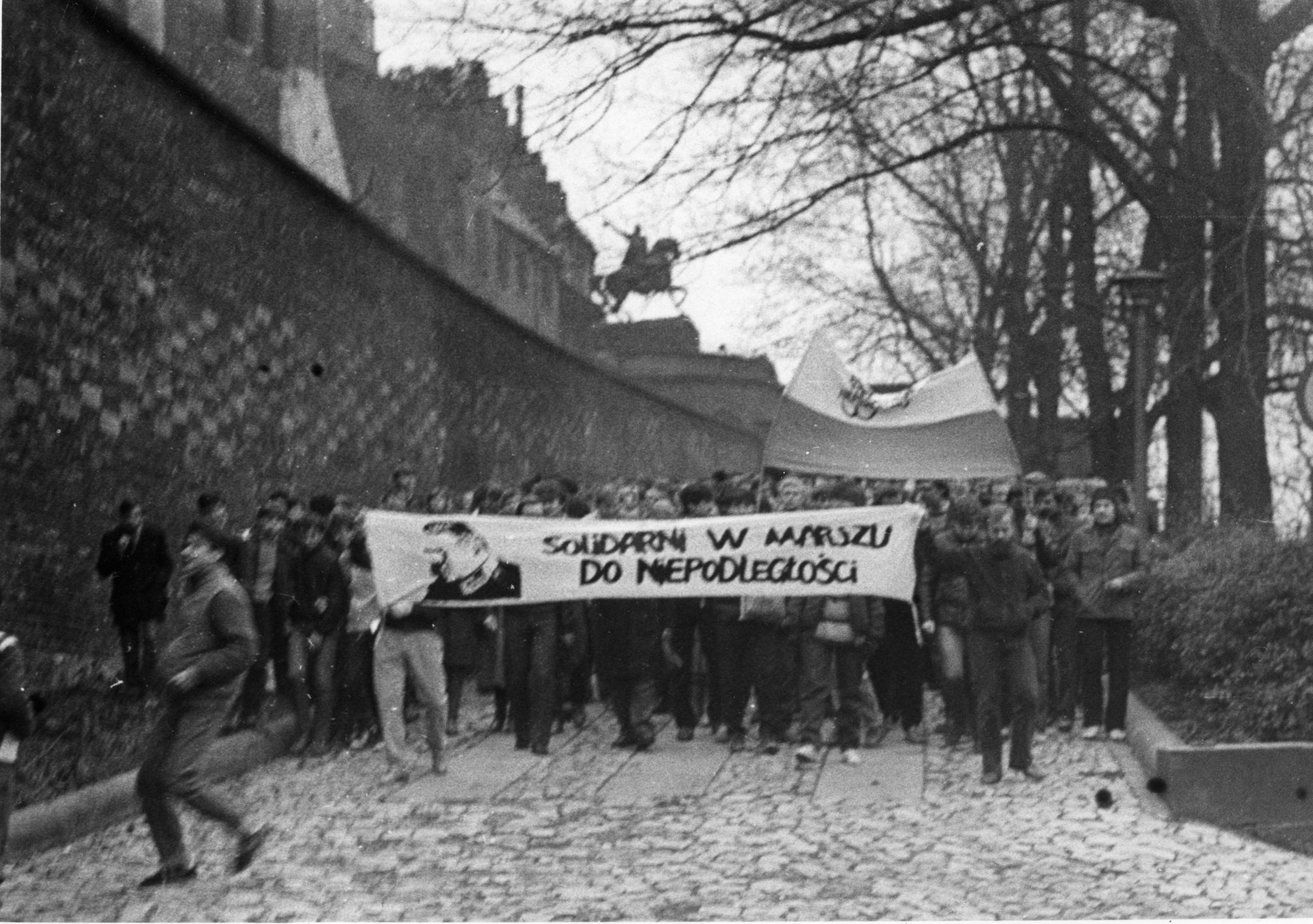
The KPN during independence demonstrations next to the Wawel Castle. On the banner Piłsudski is recognizable.

Another important reference to Piłsudski's Second Polish Republic were the independence anniversary celebrations celebrated on 11 November 1979 in Kraków, carrying banners with Piłsudski through the old capital. Such celebrations were organized throughout the entire communist period from then on and would often end with intervention of the communist Citizen's Militia and mass arrests.

Party leader Leszek Moczulski, together with founding member Romuald Szeremietiew and others, were arrested and sentenced to prison for allegedly wanting to overthrow the communist government in 1981, but were released in 1984 with amnesty. After the declaration of Martial Law by General Wojciech Jaruzelski, head of the Polish United Worker's Party, the arrests of KPN members increased drastically.

In December of 1984 the KPN Congress held decisive votes on questions of leadership and the direction the party would take from now on.

Romuald Szeremietiew's national conservative faction wanted to modernize and democratize the party, and clearly steer it into the direction of a modern right-wing party, combining traditional Polish values and healthy progressivism. The other faction, led by Leszek Moczulski wanted to keep a pluralist, big-tent party that had a spectrum of National Democracy to Socialist patriotism. Moczulski was supported by Adam Słomka and Krzysztof Król.

Despite their numerical superiority, Szeremietiew's faction knew, that Moczulski would never agree to step down from leadership, leading them to leave the party and form the new Polish Independence Party (PPN). The PPN would intensivally be in contact with the government of the pre-war Second Polish Republic, which went into exile during the Second World War. President-in-exile Kazimierz Sabbat invited the activists to London, where they would meet the President.

In the 1980s the Confederacy of Independent Poland continued activities alongside the rising Solidarity movement until the Communist dictatorship ended in 1989 and the Polish government-in-exile returned from exile in London.

=== After the Fall of Communism ===
After the fall of communism, Leszek Moczulski was a candidate in the elections for Polish president, but got only 2.5% of votes in the 1990 presidential election and withdrew during the following one. In the 1991 parliamentary election the party got 7.5% of the vote, while in the 1993 parliamentary election it received 5.7%.

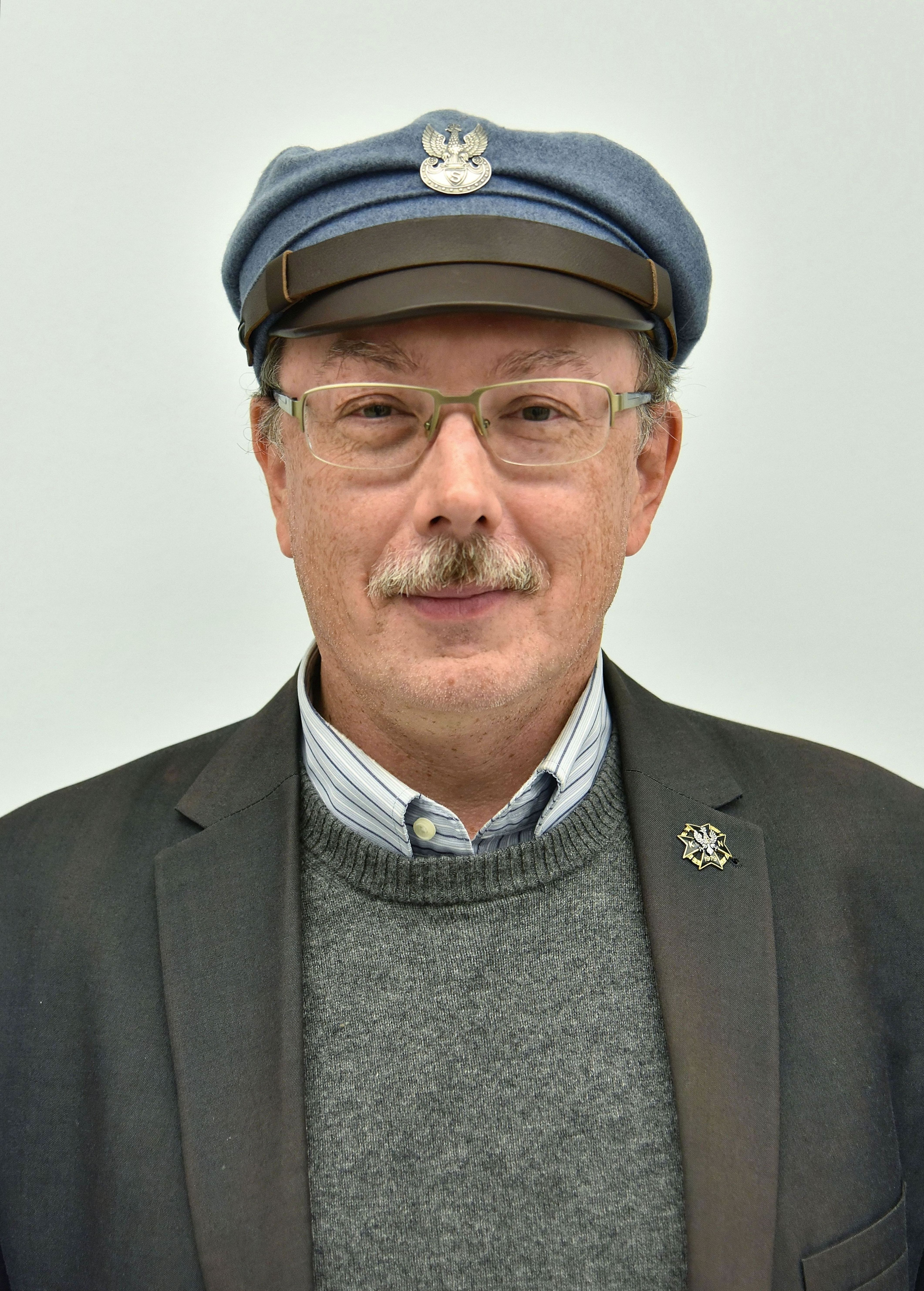
Adam Słomka, the current head of the KPN.

In 1996, it suffered a split, with the Konfederacja Polski Niepodległej – Obóz Patriotyczny faction under Adam Słomka leaving KPN. KPN then joined Solidarity Electoral Action, but left it in 1997, before the 1997 parliamentary election, in which it didn't participate. For the 2001 parliamentary elections, it allied itself with Solidarity Electoral Action of the Right (AWSP), but its candidates got 0.08% and the AWSP (which got 5.6%) failed to elect a single representative (the threshold was 8%).

In 2003, Leszek Moczulski dissolved the KPN, while Słomka declared his KPN-OP the main KPN and gathered some members of the now-disbanded Moczulski's KPN. The party has been re-registered with the Polish authorities in 2007 and took part in the 2009 European parliament elections.

The party is active today under the leadership of Adam Słomka. The main goals of the party are the decommunization of the Polish courts and the preparation for an Intermarium Federation, as Piłsudski envisioned it.

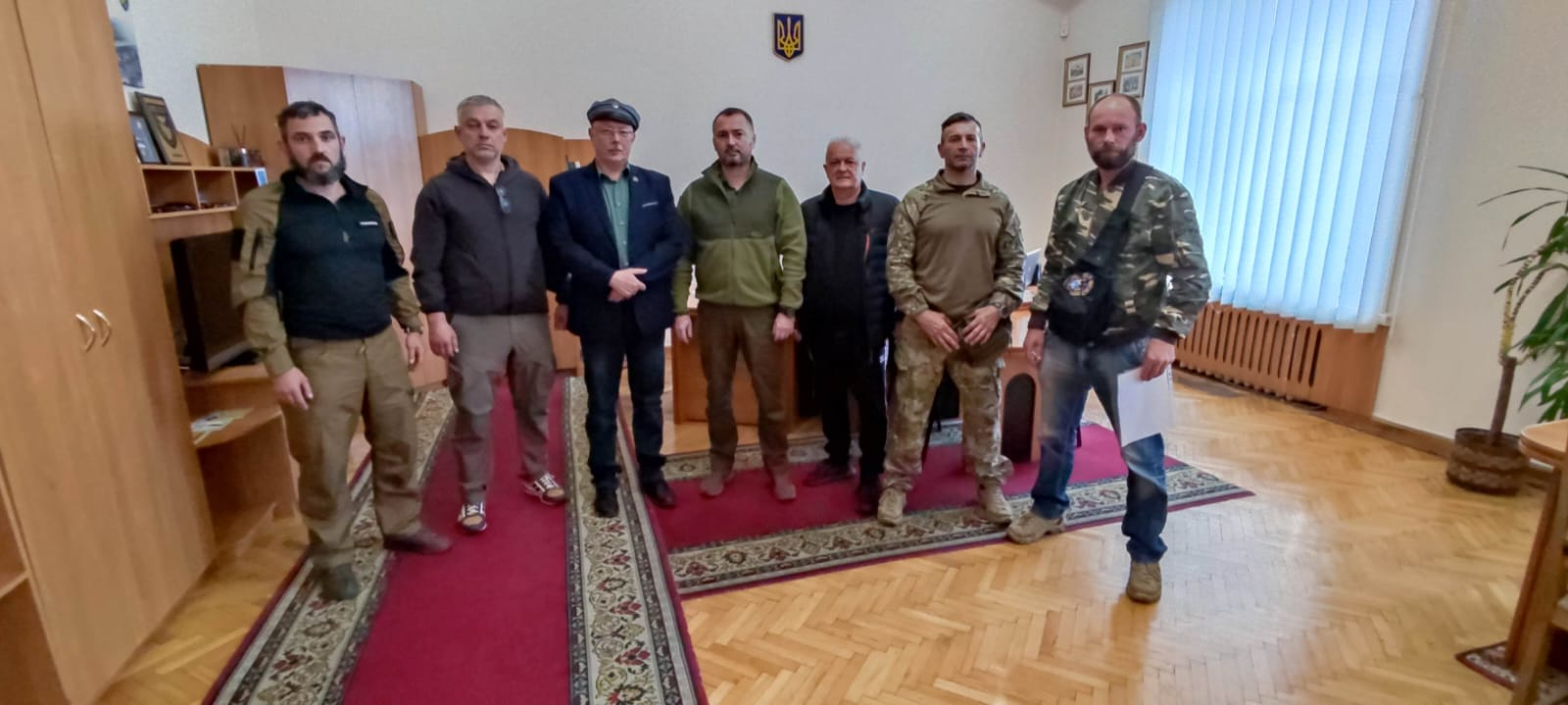
The Polish Legion in Ukraine

After the outbreak of the Russian invasion of Ukraine in 2022, Adam Słomka gathered voulenteers and formed the paramilitary Polish Legion in Kraków, which in reference to Piłsudski's legions marched from the Oleandry avenue. Adam Słomka's Polish Legion left for Ukraine, where they are helping with the war effort.

== Election results ==
=== Presidential ===
Election year	Candidate	1st round		2nd round
Election year	Candidate	# of votes	% of vote	2nd round
1990	Leszek Moczulski	411,516	2.50 (#6)	Supported Lech Wałęsa
1995	Leszek Moczulski (withdrew)	Supported Lech Wałęsa		Supported Lech Wałęsa

=== Sejm ===
Election year	# of votes	% of vote	# of overall seats won	+/–
1989	122,132 (first round; contested seats)	0.53 (#5)	0 / 460 0 / 161 (contested seats)	—
1991	841,738	7.5 (#6)	46 / 460	▲46
1993	795,487	5.77 (#6)	22 / 460	▼24

=== Senate ===
Election year	# of votes	% of vote	# of overall seats won	+/–
1989	54,683 (first round)	0.19 (#3) (first round)	0 / 100	—
1991	1,071,364	4.67 (#8)	4 / 100	▲4
1993	1,646,654	6.04 (#6)	0 / 100	▼4

== See also ==
- Federation of Fighting Youth
- Solidarity
- Nonpartisan Bloc for Support of Reforms
