= Opinion polling for the 1993 Polish parliamentary election =

In the run up to the 1993 Polish parliamentary election, opinion polling was conducted to gauge voting intention in Poland. Results of such polls are displayed in this article.

The date range for these opinion polls are from the previous parliamentary election, held on 27 October 1991, to 19 September 1993.

== Opinion polls ==
Polling firm	Polling date	Sample size	SLD	PSL	UD	UP	KKW "Ojczyzna"				KPN	BBWR	PC PC-ZP	NSZZ	KLD	UPR	SRP	X	RdR KdR	PSL–PL	Others Undecideds	Lead
Polling firm	Polling date	Sample size	SLD	PSL	UD	UP	ZChN	KP			KPN	BBWR	PC PC-ZP	NSZZ	KLD	UPR	SRP	X	RdR KdR	PSL–PL	Others Undecideds	Lead
Polling firm	Polling date	Sample size	SLD	PSL	UD	UP	ZChN	SLCh	PChD	PK	KPN	BBWR	PC PC-ZP	NSZZ	KLD	UPR	SRP	X	RdR KdR	PSL–PL	Others Undecideds	Lead
Parliamentary election	19 Sep 1993		20.41	15.40	10.59	7.28	6.37				5.77	5.41	4.42	4.90	3.99	3.18	2.78	2.74	2.70	2.37	1.69	5.01
OBOP	30-31 Aug 1993	1,500	15.6	18.6	17.6	9.1	3.3				7.5	6.1	1.2	4.1	3.6	2	2.2	3	1.9	2.8	1.4	3.0
CBOS	27-29 Aug 1993	1,104	15	13	12	6	3				3	6	0.5	5	3	1	2	5	1	2	20	2
OBOP	24 Aug 1993		19	13.5	16.5	9.2	3.9				7.2	9.3	1.6	4.8	4.8	1.4	2.7	1.4	1.4	2.7	0.6	5.5
Promedia	23-24 Aug 1993		17.01	10.21	9.81	5.9	2.4				7.21	4.5	2.2	2.1	3.9	2.6	0.8	1.7	1.2			6.8
Września Primary	22 Aug 1993		33.8	1.1	17.1	14.1	0.8				1.1	2.1	1.7	1.5	9.9	8.4	1.1	6.3	0.5	0.4		16.7
CBOS	12-17 Aug 1993	1,376	14	16	13	6	3				5	6	0.4	4	2	1	1	3	2	1	22.6	2
Demoskop	2 Aug 1993		11	13	21																	8
CBOS	9-12 Jul 1993		10	12	13	5	4	1			6	11	2	6	4	1	2	3	2	2	16	1
CBOS	18-21 Jun 1993		9	13	14	4	1	2			7	10	3	8	4	0.4	1	3		1	19.6	1
CBOS	11-14 Jun 1993		12	10	16	7	3	0.3	0.1	1	6		1	8	4	1	1	1	4	3	21.6	6
OBOP (Note: Adjusted to exclude non-voters)	7-8 Jun 1993	1,500	7	10.6	14.1	4.9	1.9	0.4	0.4		6.5		1.4	5	3.2	1		1.3	1.2	0.9	40.3	3.5
OBOP	May 1993		4.9	10.5	16.6	4.3	3	1	0.5		5.8		1.8	6.5	2.3	1.1		2	1.4	2.7	35.5	6.1
CBOS	14-17 May 1993	1,075	12	12	13	8	3	1	2	1	6		1	8	9	2	1	5	3	3	10	1
CBOS	Apr 1993		12	14	16	6	5	1	1	0.3	5		1	7	6	1	2	5	3	2	12.7	2
CBOS	Mar 1993		10	14	19	7	5	1	0.4	0.2	5		1	7	7		2	3	4	2	12.4	5
CBOS	Feb 1993		7	15	16	8	3	0	1	1	9		2	6	7		1	4	4	1	15	1
CBOS	Jan 1993		9	14	18	4	3	1	0.2	1	8		1	8	6		2	6	3	1	14.8	4
CBOS	16-20 Jul 1992	1,124	5	12	21	1	3	1	1		6		2	9	3		0.4	1	0.1	1	32.3	9
Parliamentary election	27 Oct 1991		11.99	8.67	12.32		8.74		1.12		7.50		8.71	5.05	7.49	2.26	0.03	0.47		5.47	21.3	0.33

== Seat projection ==
Polling firm	Polling date	SLD	PSL	UD	UP	KKW "Ojczyzna"	KPN	BBWR	PC PC-ZP	NSZZ	KLD	UPR	SRP	X	RdR KdR	PSL–PL	Others	Majority	SLD+PSL
Parliamentary election	19 Sep 1993	171	132	74	41	0	22	16	0	0	0	0	0	0	0	0	0	Hung	303
CBOS	27-29 Aug 1993	143 (Note: Constituency – 117, National – 26)	126 (Note: Constituency – 104, National – 22)	99 (Note: Constituency – 78, National – 21)	31	0	0	32	0	15	0	0	0	14	0	0	0	Hung	269
Promedia	23-24 Aug 1993	180 (Note: Constituency – 153, National – 27)	98 (Note: Constituency – 82, National – 16)	87 (Note: Constituency – 72, National – 15)	33	0	62 (Note: Constituency – 51, National – 11)	0	0	0	0	0	0	0	0		0	Hung	278
OBOP	24 Aug 1993	144 (Note: Constituency – 126, National – 18)	83 (Note: Constituency – 70, National – 13)	108 (Note: Constituency – 93, National – 15)	43 (Note: Constituency – 35, National – 8)	0	26 (Note: Constituency – 20, National – 6)	56 (Note: Constituency – 47, National – 9)	0	0	0	0	0	0	0	0	0	Hung	227
Parliamentary election	27 Oct 1991	60	48	62		49 (Note: Catholic Electoral Action)	46		44 (Note: Center Civic Alliance)	27	37	3	0	3		28	53	Hung	108
