= Party X =

Party X Partia X
- Leader: Stanisław Tymiński (1991–1995); Józef Kossecki (1995–1999)
- Founded: 10 December 1990
- Dissolved: 15 February 1999
- Headquarters: ul. Nowy Świat 29 m. 35, 00-029 Warszawa
- Membership (1991): 8,000
- Ideology: Left-wing nationalism Economic patriotism Anti-neoliberalism; Protectionism; Populism; Factions: National communism National Bolshevism
- Political position: Left-wing
- Colors: Black; Red; White

Party X (Polish: Partia X) was a political party in Poland. The party was founded shortly after the 1990 presidential elections by Stanisław Tymiński, a dark horse candidate who received the second highest number of votes in the first round, qualifying for the second round and challenging, albeit unsuccessfully, popular trade union activist Lech Wałęsa. Party X was Tymiński's personal party and sought to emulate his populist rhetoric, presenting itself as an anti-establishment outsider party. The party proposed a new economic system in Poland called 'labour capitalism' based on rejecting the influence and capital of both the United States and Russia in favour of reinforcing the 'economic sovereignty' of Poland and turning Poland into a 'utopia of smallholders' through a modernisation programme. At the same time, it criticised neoliberalism and deregulation.

The party membership mainly consisted of figures associated with the fallen Polish communist regime, and Tymiński made pro-communist remarks such as his support for the martial law in Poland from 1981 to 1983. The party contested the 1991 parliamentary elections, but 90% of the party's electoral lists were rejected by the Electoral Commission due to procedural irregularities. It received 0.5% of the popular vote and won three seats in the Sejm. One of the party's deputies left the party while in office. The party then participated in the 1993 parliamentary elections and received 2.7% of the vote, but failed to win any seats due to the newly implemented 5% electoral threshold. After the election, the party declined and became marginalised. After failing to win enough seats to register his candidacy in the 1995 presidential elections, Tymiński stepped down as the party leader. The party was subsequently dissolved in 1999. Tymiński left Poland after the party's dissolution, but returned twice to unsuccessfully contest the 2005 presidential election and then the 2023 Senate election.

== History ==
After the Polish Round Table Agreement in 1989, the Polish-Canadian businessman Stanisław Tymiński moved to Poland and tried to enter Polish politics. He entered the 1990 presidential elections, managing to gather enough signatures to register his candidacy. An outsider without any political background, Tymiński won over a large part of the electorate with his effective criticism of the elite and vague promises. Television played the biggest role in gaining widespread popularity, with political scientist Marek Mazur writing "Tymiński, speaking in the convention of a television psychotherapist, probably on purpose, spread an aura of metaphysical mystery."

Using television advertisement and populist rhetoric, Tymiński styled himself as a patriot and a 'billionaire who would sacrifice everything for the good of the Fatherland'. As a dark horse candidate and a Pole who 'made it' abroad, Tymiński appealed to non-voters, young people as well as students, small businessmen and the unemployed. Presenting himself as a 'candidate from nowhere', Tymiński became a protest vote in the election, and managed to qualify for the second round by finishing second in the first round, receiving 23% of the popular vote. However, in the second round, Tymiński lost to Lech Wałęsa in a landslide.

Despite ultimately losing the election, the fact that he managed to reach the second round and emerge as the second strongest candidate in the election buoyed Tymiński's popularity. To bring together his supporters, Tymiński founded and registered Party X in December 1990. Despite attracting significant publicity in its early days, the party's reputation was damaged by numerous splits and several party activists being revealed to be former Security Service agents.

In May 1991, the party held a national convention, where Tymiński was elected as the party's inaugural president. Józef Ciuruś became vice-president, while Władysław Jarzębiowski became the party's spokesman. The party had a total of 8,000 members at the time, and started preparing for the 1991 elections. However, the National Electoral Commission declared 32 of the party's district lists invalid over procedural errors, which meant that the party was unable to contest the election in 90% of districts.

The party was accused of being largely composed of former Polish People's Party communist activists as well as antisemites. Polish magazine Wprost claimed that most members of the party were men aged 50–60 and one-in-three were former communist civil servants. This accusation resurfaced after Tymiński made positive remarks about Polish hardline communist leader Wojciech Jaruzelski, which made his campaign appear influenced by communist rhetoric.

In the 1991 parliamentary elections, the party received 0.5% of the vote, winning three seats in the Sejm. Although its vote share in the Senate election was much higher at 3.6%, it failed to win any seats in the upper house. The three deputies of the party were Waldemar Jędryka, Kazimierz Chełstowski and Antoni Czajka. In 1992, Jędryka defected to the social-democratic Democratic Left Alliance. Chełstowski and Czajka became unaffiliated.

Prior to the 1993 parliamentary elections, Party X presented its programme, the Plan X. In preparation for the election, Tymiński claimed that Party X could count on the support of 75% of voters. Despite increasing its vote share in the 1993 Sejm election to 2.7%, it failed to win any seats, following the introduction of a 5% electoral threshold.

The party failed to collect enough signatures for Tymiński to run in the 1995 presidential elections. In 1995, the former deputy Józef Kossecki became head of Party X and Tymiński became honorary leader. At that time, a group of activists took the initiative to change the party's name to Party X of Polish Patriots (Polish: Partia X Patriotów Polskich), but Tymiński was against it.

Party X did not participate in the 1997 parliamentary elections or any of the subsequent election campaigns. In 1997, the party was struck off the party register because its statute did not meet the requirements of the new Political Parties Act. It did not take into account field branches and did not specify the size of the quorum necessary to pass resolutions at statutory bodies.

However, under the name Party X, the party was registered in the new register and deleted and put into liquidation on 15 February 1999. The Administrative Court upheld this decision on 17 June 1999.

Tymiński returned to Canada after the dissolution of the party. He then came back to Poland to contest the 2005 presidential elections, but received only 0.16% of the popular vote. In the 2023 parliamentary elections, Tymiński was a candidate for the Senate for a minor party, the Slavic Union. He received 18,052 (12.71%) of the vote in his district, failing to win a seat.

== Ideology ==
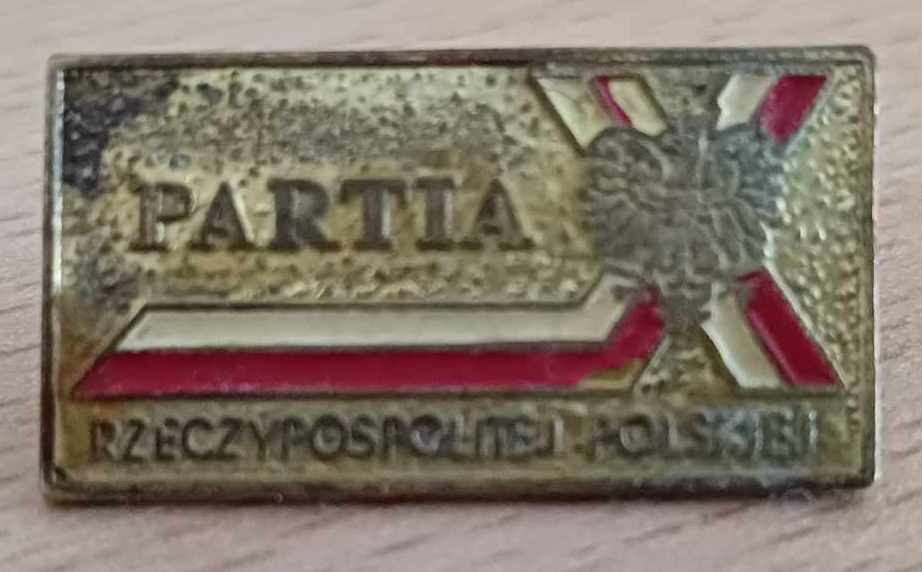
Pin of the party.

The ideology of Party X was unclear and the subject of speculation. Tymiński and his party were seen as 'extremely populist' and lacking a concrete political programme. On the other hand, the political position of the party was considered left-wing. The main appeal of the Party X and Tymiński was their outsider appeal and seeming emergence from 'nowhere', far removed from the well-entrenched anti-communist and post-communist dichotomy. The populist rhetoric of the party went as far as arguing that Poland is embroiled in a 'civil war' between the enfranchised elites and the public. The party dismissed democracy as worse than communism.

Despite being considered 'pure' populist, some political scientists underpinned ideological currents present in the party. According to Polish political scientist Jarosław Tomasiewicz, the party was anti-clerical, as seen by the disdain the party held towards Polish traditionalism and the 'God-fearing rhetoric' of mainstream politicians. Party X was also radically nationalist, and spoke of the need to defend Poland from foreign capital, arguing that the economic influence of the United States in Poland would result in the 'domination of speculative capital'. Similarly, Party X stated that given the strength of the German economy, giving it free access to the Polish market would result in an 'economic age-old Drang nach Osten'. The party was also accused of antisemitic appeals, most notably through the term udekomuna, which originated from the Jewish minority in Poland.

Emphasizing its populist, anti-establishment and outsider identity, the party described itself as the 'third force' that was above the contemporary divides of Polish politics and society. The party was particularly critical of Leszek Balcerowicz and his neoliberal Balcerowicz Plan that introduced capitalist economy in Poland through harsh privatisation and deregulation policies. It emphasised protectionism and criticised the need to trade and integrate Poland into the market of either the West or Russia, proposing the 'third way' of Polish economic independence instead.

=== Economic issues ===
Another part of Tymiński's rhetoric was his seemingly left-wing stance on economy, as he harshly attacked the neoliberal Balcerowicz Plan, claiming that its imposition had worsened Polish economy by 40%, deriding it as 'shock without therapy'. This was compaigned with the electoral programme of Tymiński and his party, which was strongly critical of the West and foreign capital. Tymiński argued that 'Independence can only be saved by a war campaign plan that will mobilise Poles for an export invasion of the West' and that 'it is necessary to attack in an offensive-partisan manner the weakest points of the Western markets'. Combined with his argument that 'there is an economic war going on, the country is under threat from outside and from within', Tymiński guided his party towards a strongly populist, economically left-wing rhetoric.

The party postulated a vision of prosperous Poland through Polish economic sovereignty, which would go hand in hand with the 'real enfranchisement of crews in workplace'. The party spoke of 'labour capitalism' that would be established through building an economy based solely on small holders. According to Party X, in order to prevent the establishment of 'monetarism' and 'domination of speculative capital' by the United States and the International Monetary Fund, 'Poland needs to be immediately mobilised as a combatant economic unit to fight in the arena of the international economic war'. The party argued that in this 'international economic war', anti-communist parties were pawns of the US, whereas the post-communist ones were pawns of Russia.

Party X employed the term 'pragmatic patriotism' which was to be based on belief that 'economic sovereignty is the basis of political sovereignty'. The party sought to safeguard the economic sovereignty through the implementation of an alternative economical model which it called 'labour capitalism'. Clarifying the term, the party declared: 'The people must be given a share of the profits earned by themselves and a dominant say in decisions affecting their plant, while at the same time taking responsibility for the consequences of those decisions.'

Amongst proposed reforms, the party listed: more flexible exchange rate of the dollar, selective privatisation through employee-owned companies, strategic planning, guided migration from regions with high unemployment, the development of housing, equality of sectors, forced reinvestment of profits, a tax on bank earnings and the dismantling of the bureaucracy. The party also called for a programme of 'modernisation' that was to be carried out through native Polish capital and reject the presence of foreign companies.

=== Communist influences ===
Party X was founded by former communist politicians and agents of the communist secret police. According to Tomasiewicz, Party X, together with the Self-Defence of the Republic of Poland and National Party "Fatherland", were parties that became refuges for national communists after 1990. Party X became known for the dominance of national-communist and Moczarite elements, and erstwhile communist officials were the party's activists. This was discovered by the media early on, and the party was accused of housing former communist civil servants, with the media pressing claims that around one-third of Party X consisted of former communist officials, while historian Adam Rok noted the majority of its members were "former hardline Communist activists".

Tomas Hellén argued that "the driving force behind the party seemed to come not from popular demand, but rather from subversive figures with some association with the communist system", and that the party was "a sinister underworld of former communist activists and secret police functionaries". The image of the party as a neo-communist escalated following Tymiński's controversial remarks, such as his praise for Wojciech Jaruzelski, the First Secretary of the Polish United Workers' Party between 1981 and 1989 who imposed a brutal and bloody martial law in Poland between 1981 and 1983. According to The Polish Review, this remark was influenced by the communist wing of Tymiński's party. Tymiński also remarked: 'I hope that our country will understand, because many people already understand how much President Jaruzelski accomplished for the country. Because our country was then [in 1981] particularly threatened, but not from outside - from within. Because the hand that has been hurting us for so many years was always its own.'

Party X had a strong national communist background, and included a variety of figures associated with the fallen Polish communist regime, especially former members of the Endocommunist Patriotic Union Grunwald. The connection of Party X to Patriotic Union Grunwald was so strong that the party offices were on its premises. The 1995-1999 leader of Party X, Józef Kossecki, was a secretary for propaganda of Grunwald. This connection was also reflected by the party's outspoken opposition to the capitalist economic reforms and privatization, which it vilified as a Jewish conspiracy that aimed at a "re-partition of Poland". Most of the party's statements were found to include the theme of foreign conspiracies to rob Poland of its wealth, which the party identified as the IMF, the World Bank, Germany, and the capitalist West in general. This made the party appeal to the most disaffected parts of the Polish society; it strongly opposed Solidarność and the collapse of the socialist regime.

Given its members and views, Party X has been described as "grunwaldite", left-wing nationalist, National Bolshevik. or rooted in communism. Political scientist Thomas Szayna noted that while it shared many ideas with the far right such as antisemitism and ultranationalism, it cannot be classified as such; similarly, Jarosław Tomasiewicz argues that the party does not represent the Polish right-wing tradition. Party X had often been compared to the agrarian socialist Self-Defence of the Republic of Poland, and Tomasiewicz stated that both parties "proclaimed an almost identical radical-populist socioeconomic program". Both parties descended from the hardline faction of the Polish United Workers' Party as well as Mieczysław Moczar's Partisan faction, whose members detested capitalism and the new post-1989 Poland. After the failure of Party X, many of its members joined Self-Defence. However, Self-Defence openly wished a restoration of communism, whereas Party X did not proclaim open nostalgia for communism.

== Election results ==
=== Sejm ===
Election year	Votes	%	Seats	+/–	Government
1991	52,735	0.47 (#22)	3 / 460	New	PC–ZChN–PSL-PL–SLCh (1991–1992)
1991	52,735	0.47 (#22)	3 / 460	New	UD–ZChN–PChD–KLD–PSL-PL–SLCh–PPPP (1992–1993)
1993	377,480	2.74 (#13)	0 / 460	▼3	Extra-parliamentary

=== Senate ===
Election year	Votes	%	Seats	+/–	Government
1991	417,857	1.82 (#12)	0 / 100	New	Extra-parliamentary
1993	33,223	0.12 (#36)	0 / 100	0	Extra-parliamentary
