= Suchocka cabinet =

Polish cabinet 1992–1993

Cabinet of Hanna Suchocka
- 4th Cabinet of Poland
- 1992–1993
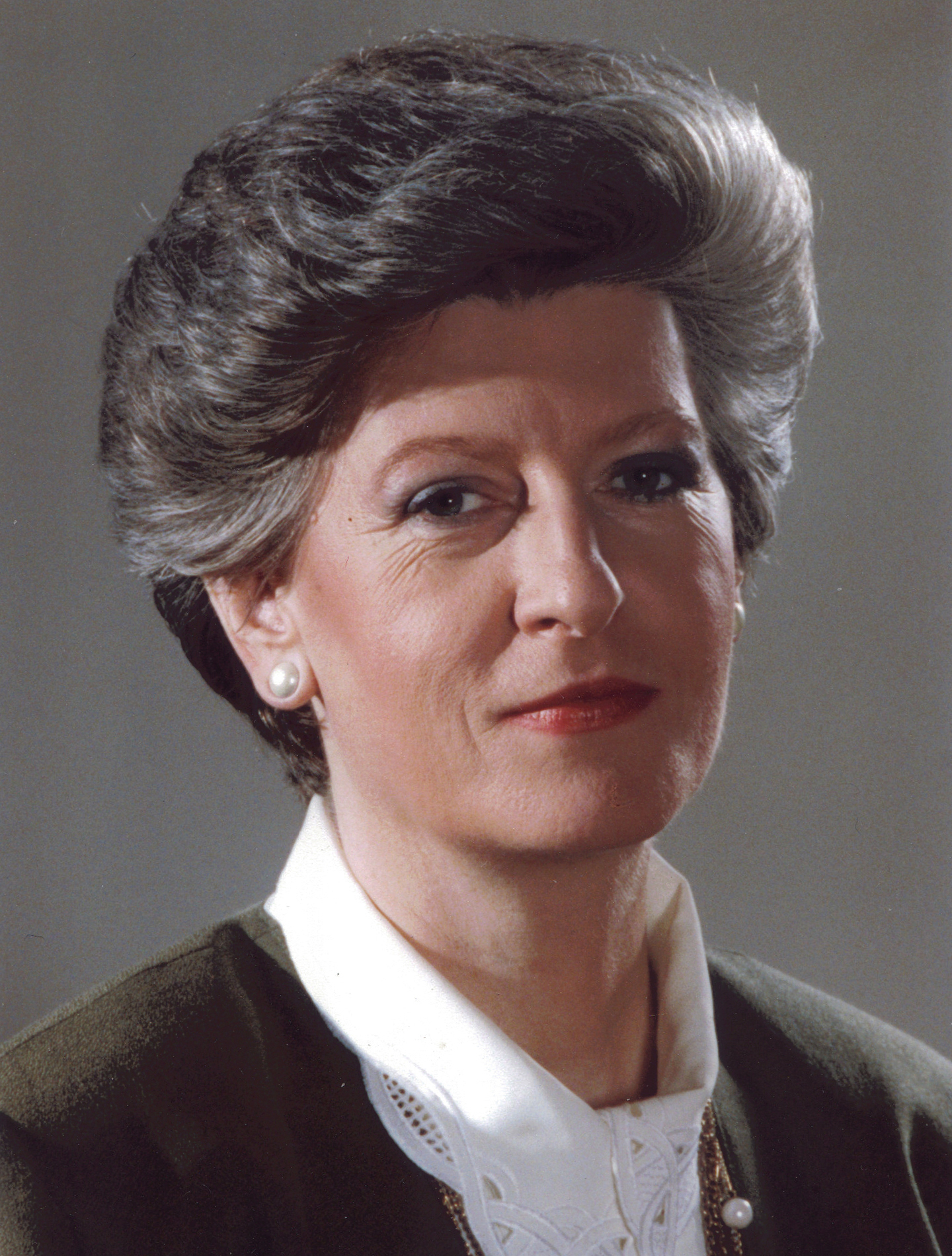
- Prime minister Hanna Suchocka (1992)
- Date formed: 11 July 1992
- Date dissolved: 26 October 1993

People and organisations
- President: Lech Wałęsa
- Prime Minister: Hanna Suchocka
- Member parties: Democratic Union; Christian National Union; Party of Christian Democrats; Liberal Democratic Congress; Peasants' Agreement; Christian-Peasant Party; Polish Economic Program
- Status in legislature: Majority (coalition)
- Opposition party: Democratic Left Alliance; Polish People's Party; Confederation of Independent Poland; Real Politics Union; Movement for the Republic; Labour Solidarity

History
- Outgoing election: 1991
- Legislature terms: 1st Sejm (1991–1993); 2nd Senate
- Predecessor: Olszewski cabinet; Pawlak premiership (Note: Did not form the cabinet and resigned.)
- Successor: Second Pawlak cabinet

The Cabinet of Hanna Suchocka was the council of ministers led by the first Polish woman prime minister Hanna Suchocka, between 11 July 1992 and 26 October 1993. The cabinet was formed after Waldemar Pawlak, presidential nominee for prime minister, had failed with creating his government and resigned. Simultaneous talks led to appointment of coalition government composed of seven parties headed with Suchocka as the least controversial candidate.

== Cabinet composition ==
Initially the cabinet consisted of 25 members, with the Minister of Culture and Art post vacant. During its tenure three ministers were dismissed and two new were appointed.

Cabinet members
Office	Holder	Party	Term
Prime Minister	Hanna Suchocka	UD	10 July 1992 – 18 October 1993
Deputy Prime Ministers	Henryk Goryszewski	ZChN	11 July 1992 – 26 October 1993
Deputy Prime Ministers	Paweł Łączkowski	PChD	11 July 1992 – 26 October 1993
Minister of National Education	Zdobysław Flisowski	–	11 July 1992 – 26 October 1993
Minister of Finance	Jerzy Osiatyński	UD	11 July 1992 – 26 October 1993
Minister of Spatial Management and Construction	Andrzej Bratkowski	–	11 July 1992 – 26 October 1993
Minister of Culture and Art	Vacant		11 July 1992 – 17 February 1993
Minister of Culture and Art	Jerzy Góral	ZChN	17 February 1993 – 26 October 1993
Minister of Communication	Krzysztof Kilian	KLD	11 July 1992 – 26 October 1993
Minister of National Defence	Janusz Onyszkiewicz	UD	11 July 1992 – 26 October 1993
Minister of Environment, Natural Resources and Forestry	Zygmunt Hortmanowicz	PL	11 July 1992 – 10 May 1993
Minister of Environment, Natural Resources and Forestry	Vacant		10 May 1993 – 26 October 1993
Minister of Labour and Social Policy	Jacek Kuroń	UD	11 July 1992 – 26 October 1993
Minister of Privatisation	Janusz Lewandowski	KLD	11 July 1992 – 26 October 1993
Minister of Industry and Trade	Wacław Niewiarowski	SLCh	11 July 1992 – 26 October 1993
Minister of Agriculture and Food Industry	Gabriel Janowski	PL	11 July 1992 – 9 April 1993
Minister of Agriculture and Food Industry	Vacant		9 April 1993 – 26 October 1993
Minister of the Interior	Andrzej Milczanowski	–	11 July 1992 – 26 October 1993
Minister of Foreign Affairs	Krzysztof Skubiszewski	–	11 July 1992 – 26 October 1993
Minister of Justice	Zbigniew Dyka	ZChN	11 July 1992 – 11 March 1993
Minister of Justice	Vacant		11 March 1993 – 17 March 1993
Minister of Justice	Jan Piątkowski	ZChN	17 March 1993 – 26 October 1993
Minister of Transport and Maritime Economy	Zbigniew Jaworski	ZChN	11 July 1992 – 26 October 1993
Minister of Foreign Economic Cooperation	Andrzej Arendarski	KLD	11 July 1992 – 26 October 1993
Minister of Health and Welfare	Andrzej Wojtyła	SLCh	11 July 1992 – 26 October 1993
Minister, Chief of the Council of Ministers Office	Jan Rokita	UD	11 July 1992 – 26 October 1993
Minister, Chief of the Central Planning Office	Jerzy Kropiwnicki	ZChN	11 July 1992 – 26 October 1993
Minister for european integration and foreign aid	Jan Krzysztof Bielecki	KLD	11 July 1992 – 26 October 1993
Minister for business promotion	Zbigniew Eysmont	PPG	11 July 1992 – 26 October 1993
Minister for political and parliamentary relations	Jerzy Kamiński	PL	11 July 1992 – 26 October 1993
Chairman of the Committee for Scientific Research	Witold Karczewski	–	11 July 1992 – 26 October 1993

Political composition
Party	Cabinet members	
Party	Initial	Final
Democratic Union (UD)	5	5
Christian National Union (ZChN)	4	5
Party of Christian Democrats (PChD)	1	1
Liberal Democratic Congress (KLD)	4	4
Peasants' Agreement (PL)	3	1
Christian-Peasant Party (SLCh)	2	2
Polish Economic Program (PPG)	1	1
Non-partisans	5	5
Vacants	1	2
Total	25	24
