= Ojczyzna (disambiguation) =

Ojczyzna is a 2026 film directed by Paweł Pawlikowski.

Ojczyzna may also refer to:

== Meaning ==
- Ojczyzna, the Polish term for "Fatherland"

== Political parties ==
- Fatherland – Polish List (Polish: Ojczyzna – Lista Polska), an electoral alliance in Poland 1933–1993
- Catholic Electoral Committee "Fatherland" (Polish: Katolicki Komitet Wyborczy "Ojczyzna"), a former conservative and Christian democratic electoral alliance in Poland 1993–1995
- Homeland Patriotic Movement (Polish: Ruch Patriotyczny "Ojczyzna"), a right-wing electoral coalition created for the 1998 Polish local elections

== See also ==
- "Honor i Ojczyzna" ("God, Honour, Fatherland"), an unofficial motto of Poland
