= 1993 Polish parliamentary election =

- 19 September 1993
- Opinion polls
- Registered: 27,655,495
- Sejm

All 460 seats in the Sejm 231 seats needed for a majority
- Turnout: 14,415,586 (52.13%) ▲8.93pp
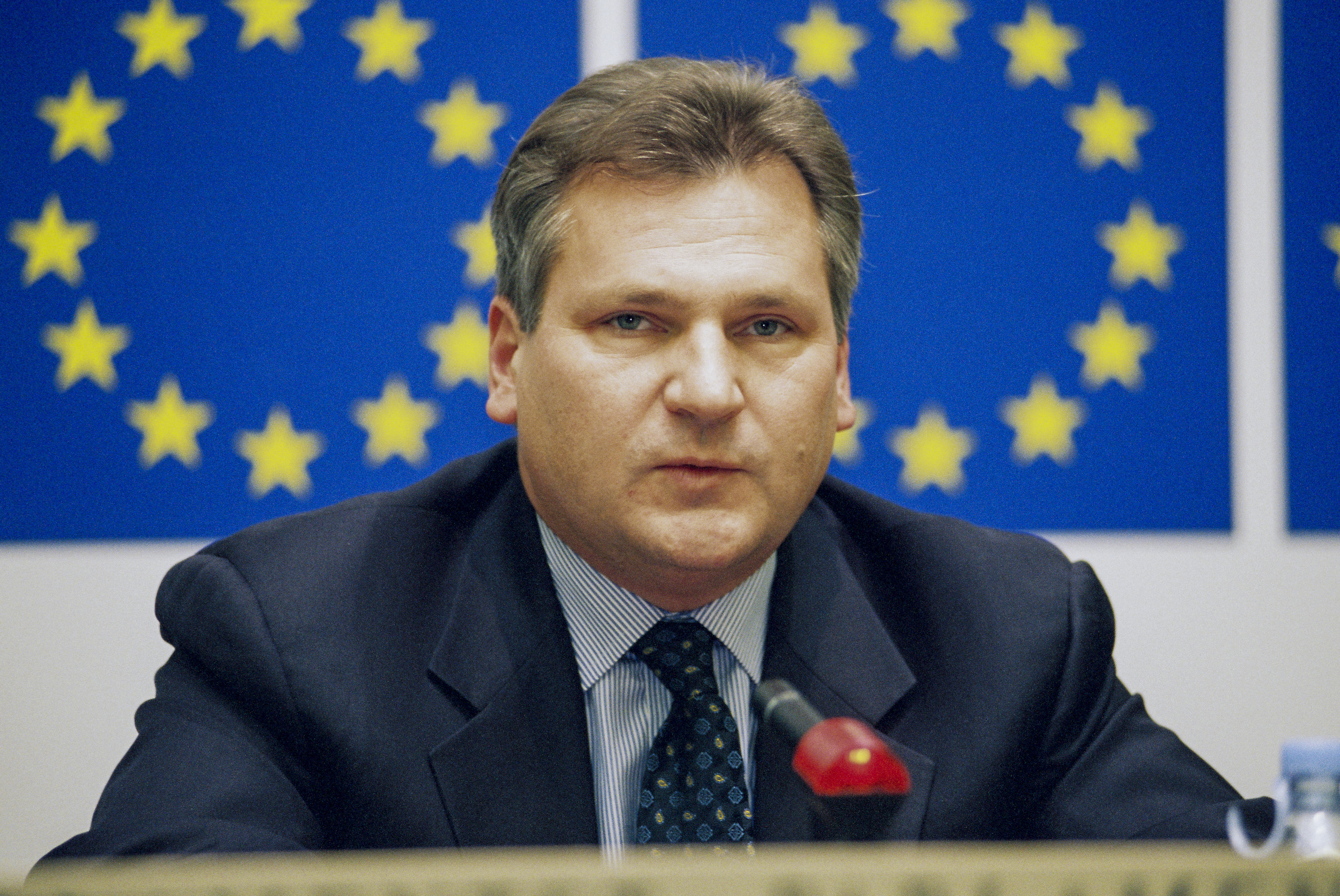

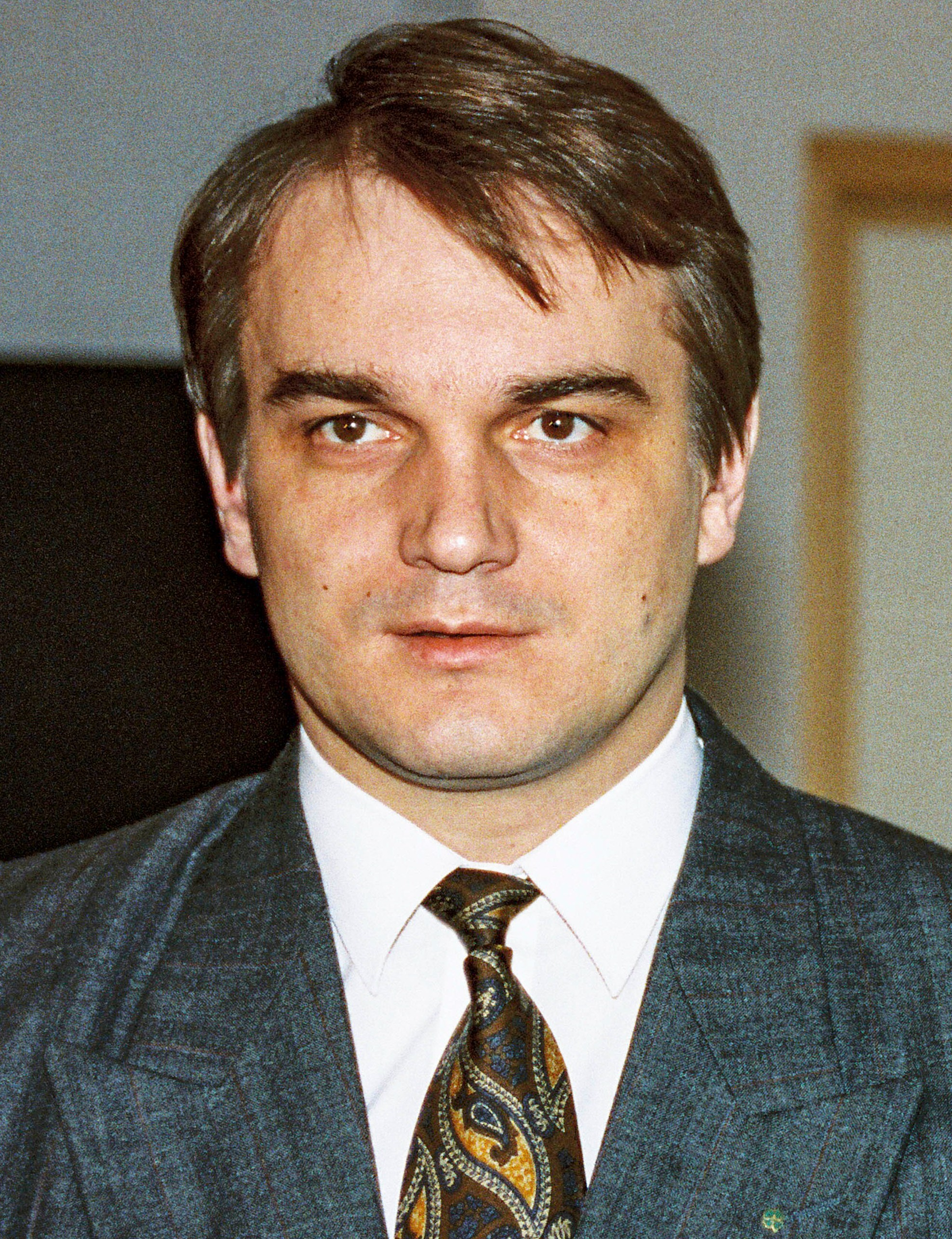

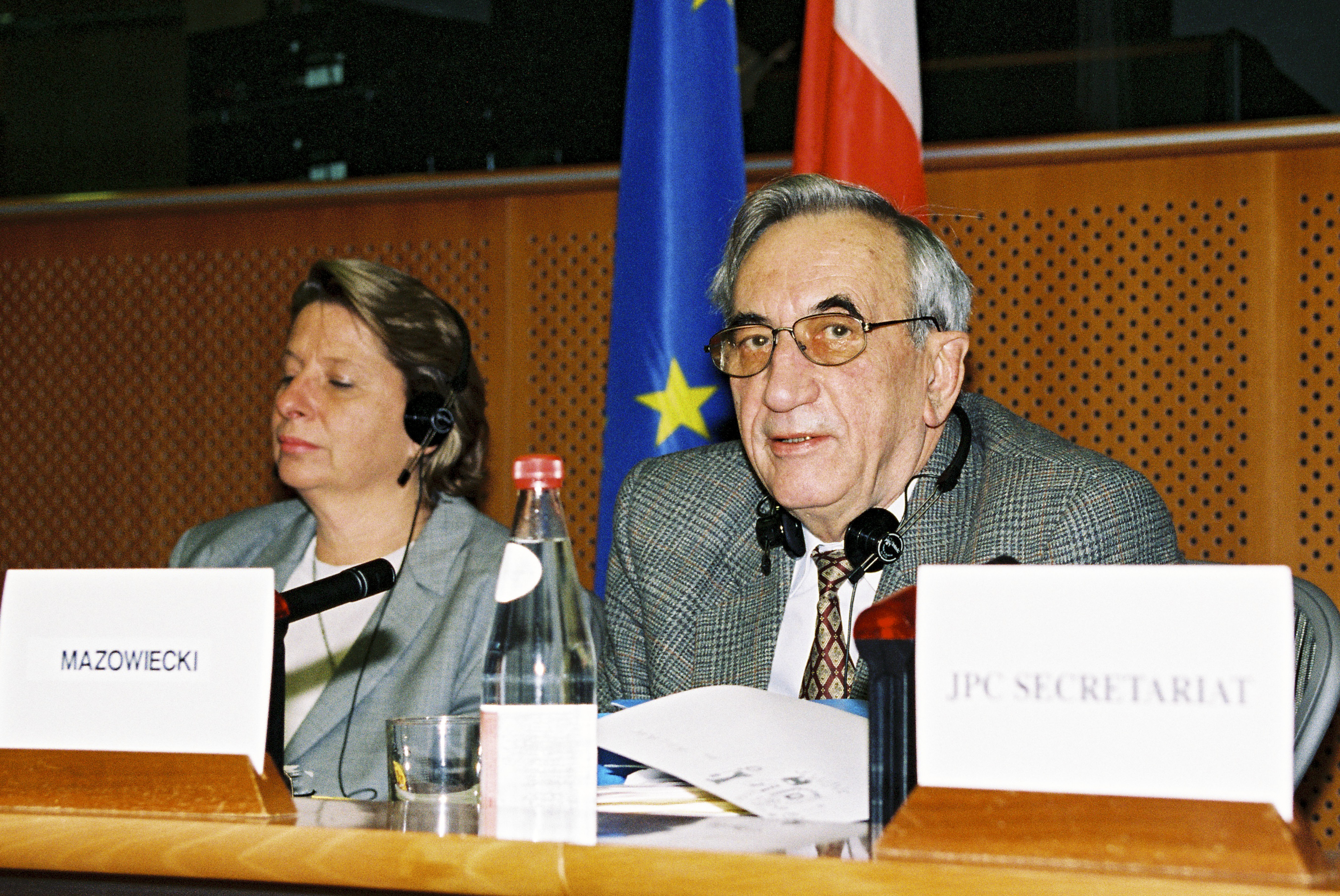

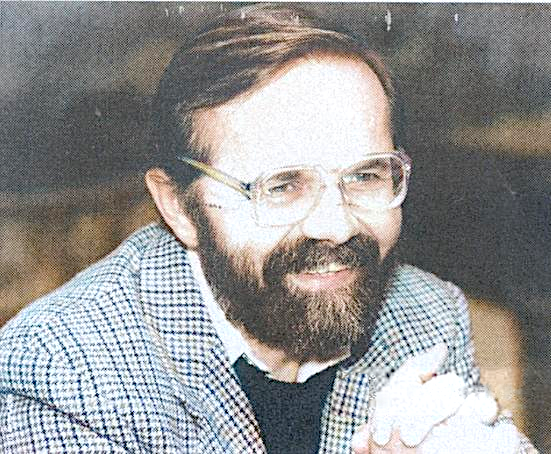

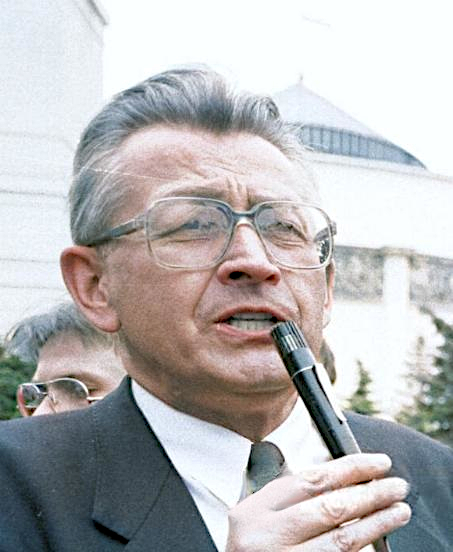

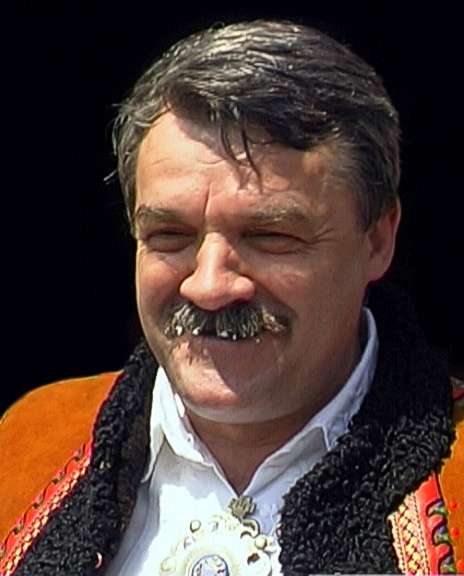
	Majority party	Minority party	Third party
Leader	Aleksander Kwaśniewski	Waldemar Pawlak	Tadeusz Mazowiecki
Party	SLD	PSL	UD
Leader since	30 January 1990	29 June 1991	12 May 1991
Leader's seat	Warsaw	Płock	Poznań
Last election	11.9%, 60 seats	8.7%, 48 seats	12.3%, 62 seats
Seats won	171	132	74
Seat change	▲111	▲84	▲12
Popular vote	2,815,169	2,124,367	1,460,957
Percentage	20.4%	15.4%	10.6%
Swing	▲8.4 pp	▲6.7 pp	▼1.7 pp
	Fourth party	Fifth party	Sixth party
Leader	Ryszard Bugaj	Leszek Moczulski	Andrzej Gąsienica-Makowski
Party	UP	KPN	BBWR
Leader since	1992	1 September 1979	1993
Leader's seat	Warsaw	Kraków	Nowy Sącz
Last election	Did not exist	7.5%, 46 seats	Did not exist
Seats won	41	22	16
Seat change	New	▼24	New
Popular vote	1,005,004	795,487	746,653
Percentage	7.3%	5.8%	5.4%
Swing	New	▼1.7 pp	New
- Senate
- All 100 seats in the Senate; 51 seats needed for a majority
- Turnout: 14,408,367 (52.10%) ▲8.90pp
Party	Vote %	Seats	+/–
SLD	18.31	37	+33
PSL	11.88	36	+29
UD	10.69	4	−17
KO "S"	9.84	9	−2
BBWR	8.05	2	New
UP	4.11	2	New
KLD	3.99	1	−5
ZP	2.23	1	New
PSL-PL	1.05	1	−4
MN	0.46	1	0
KIK – SRK (Note: Barbara Łękawa, the only elected candidate, was seated in the Senate as part of NSZZ "Solidarność")	0.37	1	New
NSZZ RI "S"	0.12	1	New
Independents	4.01	4	+4
This lists parties that won seats. See the complete results below.

Government before	Government after
Suchocka cabinet UD—ZChN—KLD—PSL-PL—SLCh—PChD—PPG	Second Pawlak Cabinet; SLD (SdRP)—PSL

Parliamentary elections were held in Poland on 19 September 1993. All 460 members of the Sejm and 100 senators of the Senate were elected. The elections were won by the left-wing parties of the Democratic Left Alliance and the Polish People's Party, who formed a coalition government. The coalition was just four seats short of a supermajority.

== Electoral law ==
Changes to the electoral law adopted in the spring of 1993 made medium and large groups be rewarded as a result of division of seats in the D'Hondt method and electoral thresholds were introduced: 5% for parties, 7% for national lists and 8% for electoral blocs.

== Campaign ==
The sudden dissolution of the First Term Sejm meant that most parties were not prepared for the election campaign. The previous dispute between the post-Solidarity and post-communist camps gave way to conflicts within the former to a large extent. Under the influence of the divergence of paths between the centrist Solidarity and the right, already visible in the 1991 campaign and intensified in 1993, conflicts within the non-leftist parties gained even more intensity. As a result, the Democratic Union (UD) had to compete for a similar electorate with the Liberal Democratic Congress (KLD). Part of the right (Christian National Union, Conservative Party, Christian-Peasant Party) started in the "Fatherland" bloc, but the rest entered the elections independently, or only coalescing microparties around them: the Centre Agreement – Polish Union (PC-ZP), Peasants' Agreement (PSL-PL), Coalition for the Republic (KdR), Confederation of Independent Poland (KPN), Solidarity ("S"), Real Politics Union (UPR). Further attempts at uniting the right-wing parties failed, and as a consequence, most of them would fall under the 5% threshold. President Lech Wałęsa sponsored the pro-presidential Nonpartisan Bloc for Support of Reforms (BBWR) list.

Against the background of the internal fighting in the Solidarity camp, the united left under the banner of the Democratic Left Alliance (SLD), the Labour Union (UP) and the more centrist Polish People's Party (PSL) appeared to many voters as forces guaranteeing stability. The lack of responsibility for the reforms of 1991-1993, including the closure of many workplaces, the rapidly growing unemployment rate and the drop in living standards, resulted in the gradual gaining of new supporters during the campaign. While the elections in June 1989 took on the character of a plebiscite on the rejection of the Polish People's Republic, in the accelerated elections of 1993, with a much higher turnout than two years earlier was seen as a referendum on the first years of the systemic transformation took place.

During the campaign, the victorious left wing segmented the electoral market, on the one hand emphasizing the threat of perceived Catholic fundamentalist policies such as concordat and strict abortion policy addressing its message to the left-wing electorate, and on the other, playing on the sentiment for the times of the Polish People's Republic for economic stability, it sought rapprochement with those who were not beneficiaries of the changes that followed the collapse of the communist system and expected an alternative in the socio-economic dimension, applying primarily to employees of the public sector and those employed in state-owned industry, including the liquidated State Agricultural Farms. The SLD blamed the doctrinaire and incompetence of the Solidarity teams for the mistakes of the transformation, declaring that it had a program and human resources capable of correcting the direction taken at the beginning of the Third Polish Republic. The PSL called for greater interventionism and protectionism in the economy. It also criticized the ongoing privatization, pointing to the advantages of other forms of ownership, such as cooperatives. Alongside with the SLD, it criticized parties and politicians of Solidarity origin. With its bold social appeal it tried to exploit the skepticism of residents of rural areas and small towns, where there were many dissatisfied with the systemic transformation.

The Democratic Union focused mainly to economic issues in its campaign, defending the direction of the changes to date and emphasizing the need for further sacrifices. It emphasized its commitment to the principles of the market economy and presented itself as a responsible, pro-state entity. The PSL was closer to the center-right groups, due to the specificity of its electoral base. The UP emphasized its commitment to the principles of the secular state. The KPN and the BBWR positioned themselves in opposition to both the post-communist camp and the anti-presidential right.

The message of the Centre Agreement – Polish Union and the Coalition for the Republic was almost entirely convergent and mainly concerned demands for breaking with the continuity of the Polish People's Republic in the Third Polish Republic. Politicians of the Fatherland bloc presented themselves as defenders of the conservative values including family values and private property. In turn, the Real Politics Union and the Liberal Democratic Congress called for further liberalization and privatization of the economy. The campaign of Solidarity and the PC-ZP was dominated by nationalistic, but at the same time social message.

== Results ==
Results of the Sejm election, showing vote strength by electoral district.

=== Sejm ===
Because of the introduction of electoral thresholds set at 5% for party lists and 8% for coalitions, 34% of valid votes were wasted.

Party or alliance		Votes	%	Seats	+/–
Democratic Left Alliance	Social Democracy of the Republic of Poland	1,615,355	11.71	77	+32
Democratic Left Alliance	All-Poland Alliance of Trade Unions	307,536	2.23	25	–
Democratic Left Alliance	Democratic Union of Women	39,940	0.29	2	–
Democratic Left Alliance	Polish Socialist Party	38,015	0.28	4	+4
Democratic Left Alliance	National Party of Retirees and Pensioners (Note: Results of parties that merged to form the National Party of Retirees and Pensioners in the following months.)	7,126	0.05	0	–
Democratic Left Alliance	Polish Socialist Youth Union	6,245	0.05	1	–
Democratic Left Alliance	Independents and others	800,952	5.81	62	–
Democratic Left Alliance	Total	2,815,169	20.41	171	+111
Polish People's Party		2,124,367	15.40	132	+84
Democratic Union		1,460,957	10.59	74	+12
Labour Union		1,005,004	7.28	41	+36
Catholic Electoral; Committee "Fatherland"	Christian National Union	415,865	3.01	0	−49
Catholic Electoral; Committee "Fatherland"	Party of Christian Democrats	145,477	1.05	0	−4
Catholic Electoral; Committee "Fatherland"	Christian-Peasant Party	134,013	0.97	0	−10
Catholic Electoral; Committee "Fatherland"	Conservative Party	71,295	0.52	0	New
Catholic Electoral; Committee "Fatherland"	Federation of Polish Entrepreneurship	22,457	0.16	0	−2
Catholic Electoral; Committee "Fatherland"	Rural Solidarity	8,967	0.06	0	New
Catholic Electoral; Committee "Fatherland"	Independents and others	80,371	0.58	0	New
Catholic Electoral; Committee "Fatherland"	Total	878,445	6.37	0	−65
Confederation of Independent Poland	Confederation of Independent Poland	392,985	2.85	11	–
Confederation of Independent Poland	Solidarity 80	21,547	0.16	0	–
Confederation of Independent Poland	Polish Ecological Party "The Greens"	18,402	0.13	0	–
Confederation of Independent Poland	Rural Solidarity	5,204	0.04	0	–
Confederation of Independent Poland	Independents and others	357,349	2.59	11	–
Confederation of Independent Poland	Total	795,487	5.77	22	–24
Nonpartisan Bloc for Support of Reforms		746,653	5.41	16	New
Solidarity		676,334	4.90	0	–27
Centre Agreement – Polish Union		609,973	4.42	0	–44
Liberal Democratic Congress		550,578	3.99	0	–37
Real Politics Union		438,559	3.18	0	–3
Lepper's Self-Defence		383,967	2.78	0	New
Party X		377,480	2.74	0	–3
Coalition for the Republic	Movement for the Republic	34,494	0.25	0	New
Coalition for the Republic	Party of Polish Democracy	12,011	0.09	0	−1
Coalition for the Republic	Rural Solidarity	11,561	0.08	0	New
Coalition for the Republic	Solidarity 80	7,807	0.06	0	New
Coalition for the Republic	Freedom Party	4,709	0.03	0	New
Coalition for the Republic	Patriotic Forum of Fighting Poland	1,362	0.01	0	New
Coalition for the Republic	National Party	934	0.01	0	0
Coalition for the Republic	National Party of the Unemployed	602	0.00	0	New
Coalition for the Republic	Independents and others	298,443	2.16	0	New
Coalition for the Republic	Total	371,923	2.70	0	New
Peasants' Agreement	Rural Solidarity	33,592	0.24	0	–
Peasants' Agreement	Peasants' Agreement	19,452	0.14	0	–
Peasants' Agreement	Solidarity	883	0.01	0	–
Peasants' Agreement	Independents	273,158	1.98	0	–
Peasants' Agreement	Total	327,085	2.37	0	–28
German Minority	German Minority of Silesian Opole	60,770	0.44	3	−4
German Minority	Social-Cultural Association of Germans - DFK	23,396	0.17	1	New
German Minority	German Community "Reconciliation and Future"	13,776	0.10	0	0
German Minority	German Minority of Częstochowskie Vvs.	10,068	0.07	0	New
German Minority	German Minority of Olsztyńskie Vvs.	2,444	0.02	0	New
German Minority	Total	110,454	0.80	4	–3
Polish Beer-Lovers' Party	Polish Party of the Greens	124	0.00	0	0
Polish Beer-Lovers' Party	Independents	14,258	0.10	0	–16
Polish Beer-Lovers' Party	Total	14,382	0.10	0	–16
Local lists and independents		109,410	0.79	0	0
Total		13,796,227	100.00	460	0
Valid votes		13,796,227	95.70		
Invalid/blank votes		619,359	4.30		
Total votes		14,415,586	100.00		
Registered voters/turnout		27,655,495	52.13		
Source: National Electoral Commission

==== By constituency ====
No.	Constituency	Total seats	Seats won						
No.	Constituency	Total seats	SLD	PSL	UD	UP	KPN	BBWR	MN
1	Warsaw I	17	7		5	3	1	1	
2	Warsaw II	8	2	2	2	1		1	
3	Biała Podlaska	3	1	2					
4	Białystok	7	4	1	1	1			
5	Bielsko-Biała	9	3	1	2	1	1	1	
6	Bydgoszcz	11	6	2	2	1			
7	Chełm	3	1	2					
8	Ciechanów	4	2	2					
9	Częstochowa	8	3	2	1	1	1		
10	Elbląg	5	3	1	1				
11	Gdańsk	15	5	2	3	2	1	2	
12	Gorzów Wielkopolski	5	2	2	1				
13	Jelenia Góra	5	2	1	1	1			
14	Kalisz	7	3	3	1				
15	Sosnowiec	10	6	1	1	1	1		
16	Katowice	17	6	1	4	2	2	2	
17	Gliwice	14	4	1	3	1	2	2	1
18	Kielce	11	4	4	1	1	1		
19	Konin	5	2	3					
20	Koszalin	5	3	1	1				
21	Kraków	13	3	2	4	1	2	1	
22	Krosno	5	1	2	1		1		
23	Legnica	5	3	1		1			
24	Leszno	4	2	2					
25	Lublin	10	4	4	1		1		
26	Łomża	4	1	3					
27	Łódź	12	5	1	2	2	1	1	
28	Nowy Sącz	7	1	2	1		1	2	
29	Olsztyn	8	4	2	1	1			
30	Opole	10	3	2	1	1			3
31	Ostrołęka	4	1	3					
32	Piła	5	3	1	1				
33	Piotrków Trybunalski	7	2	3		1	1		
34	Płock	5	1	4					
35	Poznań	14	4	2	5	3			
36	Przemyśl	4	1	3					
37	Radom	8	2	4	1			1	
38	Rzeszów	7	2	3	1		1		
39	Siedlce	7	2	5					
40	Sieradz	4	1	3					
41	Skierniewice	4	1	3					
42	Słupsk	4	2	1	1				
43	Suwałki	5	2	2		1			
44	Szczecin	10	4	1	2	1	1	1	
45	Tarnobrzeg	6	2	3			1		
46	Tarnów	7	1	4	1		1		
47	Toruń	7	3	2	1	1			
48	Wałbrzych	8	4	1	2	1			
49	Włocławek	4	3	1					
50	Wrocław	12	4	2	3	1	1	1	
51	Zamość	5	1	4					
52	Zielona Góra	7	3	2	1	1			
National list		69	26	20	14	9			
Total		460	171	132	74	41	22	16	4
Source: National Electoral Commission

=== Senate ===
Voters were able to cast as many votes as there were seats available in their constituency.

Party	Votes	%	Seats	+/–
Democratic Left Alliance	4,993,061	18.31	37	+33
Polish People's Party	3,238,999	11.88	36	+29
Democratic Union	2,913,773	10.69	4	–17
Solidarity	2,683,085	9.84	9	–2
Nonpartisan Bloc for Support of Reforms	2,193,970	8.05	2	New
Confederation of Independent Poland	1,646,654	6.04	0	–4
Labour Union	1,121,744	4.11	2	New
Liberal Democratic Congress	1,088,769	3.99	1	–5
Self-Defence of the Republic of Poland	650,727	2.39	0	New
Polish Union	607,624	2.23	1	New
Christian National Union	486,387	1.78	0	New
Real Politics Union	434,657	1.59	0	0
Catholic Electoral Committee "Fatherland"	323,135	1.19	0	–9
Silesian Autonomy Movement	304,877	1.12	0	New
Coalition for the Republic	290,361	1.06	0	New
Peasants' Agreement	285,406	1.05	1	–4
Democratic Party	218,295	0.80	0	0
Polish Convention	156,129	0.57	0	New
Association of Friends of the John Paul II Museum	155,538	0.57	0	New
Citizens' Electoral Committee	129,961	0.48	0	New
German Minority	124,986	0.46	1	0
KIK–SRK (Note: Barbara Łękawa, the only elected candidate, was seated in the Senate as part of NSZZ "Solidarność")	99,737	0.37	1	New
Service to the Child (Note: The two candidates, Maria Hrabowska in Gdańsk and Ryszard Pacławski in Krosno were both leaders of the Polish Scouting and Guiding Association)	90,790	0.33	0	–
Party of Christian Democrats	81,029	0.30	0	–
Polish Beer-Lovers' Party	77,365	0.28	0	–
Kashubian–Pomeranian Association	75,038	0.28	0	–
Patriotic Forum of Fighting Poland (Note: Part of the Coalition for the Republic)	63,752	0.23	0	–
Club of Catholic Intelligentsia – Lublin (Note: Unaffiliated with the other KIK circles.)	60,935	0.22	0	–
Orthodox Electoral Committee	51,815	0.19	0	–
Polish Federation of Engineering Associations	46,131	0.17	0	–
Social Movement for the Region and Poland	37,984	0.14	0	–
Polish Aid Council	37,780	0.14	0	–
Fatherland – Polish List	37,055	0.14	0	–
Disabled People Live Among Us	35,150	0.13	0	–
Rural Solidarity (Note: Independent Self-Governing Trade Union of Individual Farmers "Solidarity" Niezależny Samorządny Związek Zawodowy Rolników Indywidualnych "Solidarność" (Polish))	33,682	0.12	1	–
Party X	33,223	0.12	0	0
PIAST	31,187	0.11	0	–
Rural Solidarity (Note: "Rolnicza Solidarność" (Polish), unaffiliated with Independent Self-Governing Trade Union of Individual Farmers "Solidarity")	27,362	0.10	0	–
Christian-Peasant Party (Note: Part of the Catholic Electoral Committee "Fatherland")	27,137	0.10	0	–
Polish Dignity	22,348	0.08	0	–
Defense of Working People	22,137	0.08	0	–
People not Parties	20,086	0.07	0	–
District Council of Nurses and Midwives	19,189	0.07	0	–
TEMIDA Lawyers' Association	18,079	0.07	0	–
Experience-Expertise-Prudence	17,083	0.06	0	–
Health–Knowledge–Success	16,835	0.06	0	–
About Polish Farming	16,230	0.06	0	–
For the Health of Poles	15,605	0.06	0	–
TKKFKŻAK	15,407	0.06	0	–
National Committee of Voters (Note: National Party: Maciej Giertych, Andrzej Fedorowicz)	15,406	0.06	0	–
Help for the Victims and the Needy	15,256	0.06	0	–
Alliance of Christian Groups	13,350	0.05	0	–
Woman Poland and Independence	12,762	0.05	0	–
Polish Greens Party	12,631	0.05	0	–
Catholic Society for the Service of Children	11,880	0.04	0	–
Polish Socialist Party	10,985	0.04	0	–
Union of Poles in Poland	10,705	0.04	0	–
National Party (Note: National Party: Eugeniusz Grzejdniak)	10,235	0.04	0	–
Conservative Party	10,231	0.04	0	–
Polish Ecological Union	10,157	0.04	0	–
Civic Forum	9,892	0.04	0	–
White and Red	9,524	0.03	0	–
For Political and Economic Order	9,063	0.03	–	–
Regional Electoral Initiative	8,306	0.03	0	–
FAMILY	8,273	0.03	0	–
Association of Sybiraks	6,798	0.02	0	–
Catholic Justice Action "Equality"	4,856	0.02	0	–
Local lists	696,354	2.55	0	–
Independents (Note: Henryk Stokłosa, Elżbieta Solska, Jerzy Madej, Aleksander Gawronik)	1,198,999	4.40	4	–
Total	27,263,952	100.00	100	0
Valid votes	13,985,535	97.07		
Invalid/blank votes	422,832	2.93		
Total votes	14,408,367	100.00		
Registered voters/turnout	27,655,495	52.10		
Source: Prawo

==== By voivodeship ====
Voivodeship	Total seats	Seats won						
Voivodeship	Total seats	SLD	PSL	KO "S"	UD	BBWR	KLD	Others
Biała Podlaska	2		2					
Białystok	2	1						1
Bielsko	2			1	1			
Bydgoszcz	2	2						
Chełm	2	1	1					
Ciechanów	2	1	1					
Częstochowa	2	1	1					
Elbląg	2	1	1					
Gdańsk	2	1		1				
Gorzów	2	1	1					
Jelenia Góra	2	2						
Kalisz	2	2						
Katowice	3	1		1		1		
Kielce	2	1	1					
Konin	2		2					
Koszalin	2	1						1
Kraków	2			1	1			
Krosno	2		1	1				
Legnica	2	1	1					
Leszno	2	2						
Lublin	2	1	1					
Łomża	2		1					1
Łódź	2	1						1
Nowy Sącz	2			1		1		
Olsztyn	2	1	1					
Opole	2				1			1
Ostrołęka	2		1	1				
Piła	2	1						1
Piotrków	2	1	1					
Płock	2		2					
Poznań	2						1	1
Przemyśl	2		1	1				
Radom	2	1	1					
Rzeszów	2		1					1
Siedlce	2		2					
Sieradz	2		2					
Skierniewice	2		2					
Słupsk	2	1	1					
Suwałki	2	1	1					
Szczecin	2	2						
Tarnobrzeg	2		2					
Tarnów	2		1	1				
Toruń	2	1						1
Wałbrzych	2	2						
Warsaw	3		1	1	1			
Włocławek	2	2						
Wrocław	2	2						
Zamość	2		2					
Zielona Góra	2	1						1
Total	100	37	36	10	4	2	1	10
Source: National Electoral Commission
