= National Party "Fatherland" =

National Party "Fatherland" Stronnictwo Narodowe „Ojczyzna” (Polish)
- Abbreviation: SN„O”
- Leader: Bogusław Rybicki; Bogusław Jeznach
- Founded: 28 March 1992
- Dissolved: 15 December 1996
- Split from: National Party (1989)
- Merged into: National Democratic Party
- Headquarters: Warsaw, Poland
- Newspaper: Ojczyzna
- Membership (1993): 3100
- Ideology: National Democracy; National Catholicism; Left-wing nationalism Left-wing populism Anti-capitalism
- Political position: Left-wing
- National affiliation: Fatherland - Polish List (1993)
- Colors: Scarlet; Orange gold; Deep blush (Fatherland – Polish List)
- Slogan: Be proud to be Polish; Polish: Bądź dumny z tego, że jesteś Polakiem

The National Party "Fatherland" (Polish: Stronnictwo Narodowe „Ojczyzna”, SNO or SN„O”) was a political party in Poland was formed in March 1992 as a result of a split in the National Party (1989) (so-called "senior party"). The party leaders were Bogusław Rybicki and Bogusław Jeznach. The newspaper of the party was the weekly magazine "Ojczyzna". National Party "Fatherland" pursued a coalition with left-wing populist and nationalist parties such as the Self-Defence of the Republic of Poland, but was unsuccessful in doing so. The party participated in the 1993 Polish parliamentary election, creating an electoral committee Fatherland - Polish List. However, it failed to win any seats, earning 15.958 votes, which amounted to 0,12% of the popular vote. The party rapidly declined after 1993, and in 1996 it dissolved to join a right-wing National Democratic Party.

SN "Ojczyzna" represented the left wing of the national camp (known as "pink endecja"), proclaiming a populist socio-economic programme. It distanced itself from the right and ignored cultural issues, going as far as mocking the Polish right for being out of touch with the problems of common people, stating that Polish right-wing parties prefer "magic incantations about Jews" and "haunted conspiracy theories" to addressing the poverty and suffering of ordinary people. The party was anti-capitalist and strongly attacked liberalization and privatization measures, especially the neoliberal Balcerowicz Plan that introduced capitalist free-market economy to Poland. The party called neoliberalism "economic genocide". It also criticized social-democratic models of capitalism as insufficient, arguing that they would nevertheless lead to the situation where "the rich control the state".

== History ==
After the Polish Round Table Agreement and end of the communist period in Poland, Polish nationalist circled united to form National Party (Polish: Stronnictwo Narodowe, SN) in 1989, which was a reactivation of an interwar national conservative party of the same name - National Party. The party was then formally registered in 1990 and restarted political activities. In the 1991 Polish parliamentary election, National Party won 74.082 votes equating to 0.66% of the popular vote. Shortly after the 1991 election, the party grew divided as notable factions and tendencies formed within it.

Amongst the growing sectionalism, two 'tendencies' were particularly notable - the "blue" faction and the "pink" faction. The blue camp represented the traditional right and aspired to closely mimic the pre-war National Party, including supporting fully capitalist liberalism economy and rejecting the Polish communist period. In contrast, the 'pink camp' was considered a left-wing deviation, criticizing the blue party's line as being elitist and too clerical. The pink faction sought to focus on socio-economic issues and advocated state-owned economy, together with an expansive welfare state. In February, Bogusław Rybicki, the leader of the pink faction, was expelled from the National Party, after being accused of being a communist civil servant. Several other activists of the party left the party in solidarity with Rybacki, and on 28 March 1992, they found National Party "Fatherland", which was to be a left-wing equivalent of the National Party.

The party held its national convention in Warsaw, where Bogusław Rybicki and Bogusław Jeznach were elected as the leaders of the party. By 1993, the party's organisational network already covered 42 provinces. The number of Ojczyzna members was around 2100 at the time. The circulation of the party's newspaper, the weekly Ojczyzna - rose from 3,500 to 6,000 copies within a year. The party started holding events, consisting mainly of anniversary celebrations, but also street protests and paramilitary training.

The party sought to run in the 1993 Polish parliamentary election. The party hold talks with Self-Defence of the Republic of Poland (Polish: Samoobrona Rzeczpospolitej Polskiej, commonly referred to as Samoobrona) in hopes of organizing an electoral coalition. Samoobrona was a far-left party; it became popular through its radical and aggressive agrarian protests, forming a paramilitary group "Peasant Battalions" (Polish: Bataliony Chłopskie), referring to a Polish agrarian WW2-era resistance movement of the same name, which protected farmers against bailiffs, evictions and police.

Samoobrona and its radical leader, Andrzej Lepper, gained widespread attention through controversial statements such as "We are a radical party, open to all disadvantaged people who are starving at home." and "If someone has a billion or two or ten, they really couldn't have made it through legal work" became widely reported and known." It had an unclear ideological profile - Polish political scientist Jarosław Tomasiewicz described it as a "radical-populist" party combined agrarianism, nationalism and "Soviet-style" communism.

Idiosyncratic views of Samoobrona, combined with their populism, left-wing nationalism and radicalism, were appealing to the National Party "Fatherland", which represented a left-wing splinter from a right-wing, radically nationalist party. Despite Rybicki's efforts, Samoobrona rejected the idea of cooperating with his National Party. Samoobrona would later drift further left and cooperate with more clearly left-wing parties through Social Alliance.

After the unsuccessful attempt to form a coalition with Samoobrona, the party decided to run in the election on its own, but open itself to cooperation with independent candidates and minor organizations through creating Fatherland - Polish List. This also allowed the party to distance itself from the 'main' National Party, which the party members considered too radical, especially in the wake of its 1991 electoral performance. Fatherland - Polist List was formally registered on 30 June 1993. It was located in Warsaw. However, the electoral bloc was undermined by the creation of Catholic Electoral Committee "Fatherland" (Polish: Katolicki Komitet Wyborczy "Ojczyzna", KKW) in July. The KKW was led by National-Catholic Christian National Union and was a coalition of Christian-democratic and political-Catholic parties. It was largely based on the Catholic Electoral Action, a coalition from the 1991 Polish parliamentary election with similar program and purpose.

However, unlike the Catholic Electoral Action, which was staunchly right-wing and National-Catholic, the Catholic Electoral Committee "Fatherland" sought to present itself as a moderate party and build a broad coalition of both churchgoing and moderate Catholics. The committee sought an official endorsement from the Polish Catholic Church, but the Church strongly emphasized its neutrality, a decision influenced by the controversy caused by the clergy's alleged support for the Catholic Electoral Action in 1991. In light of this, the KKW organized through parish councils instead.

The Catholic Electoral Committee "Fatherland" not only had an almost identical name to Fatherland - Polish List. National Party "Fatherland" and its allies strongly protested the "theft" of its committee and filed a lawsuit against the Catholic committee, but they were unable to hamper the KKW. Ultimately, Fatherland - Polish List performed terribly in the 1993 election, receiving only 15.958 votes, which equated 0.12% of the popular vote.

After its disappointing performance in the 1993 election, the party started rapidly declining. The party leadership attempted to revive the party by presenting itself as "revisionist-nationalist" party, hoping to recruit new members and develop an attractive ideological life. The Unification Congress of National Organisations was held in April 1994, where a couple of tiny political groupings joined the National Party "Fatherland". However, despite the merger, the paty kept declining - members withdrew from party activity or deserted to other groupings, including Samoobrona.

In 1995, Bogusław Rybicki launched his campaign for the 1995 Polish presidential election, running on a protectionism, isolationist and anti-privatization platform. However, he withdrew his candidacy before the election.

There was also a clear decline in activity. There were only sporadic pickets; the most important manifestation of the party's activity was the lectures delivered in the field by Rybicki. National Party "Fatherland" was still looking for support in Andrzej Lepper and his Samoobrona, but Rybicki party was not an attractive partner for Lepper, especially as Samoobrona steadily moved towards a direction of becoming a 'stabilized' left-wing party. Samoobrona eschwed its vague position in favour of developing a clearly defined far-left ideology - Lepper called for a "worker-peasant alliance" and increasingly marginalized and dismissed the nationalist wing of the party. By the late 1990s, Lepper also called for return to socialism arguing that it had "not yet reached full maturity".

Isolated, Rybicki decided that the National Party "Fatherland" is no longer able to function on its own and pursued rapprochement with the National Democratic Party (the grouping representing the 'right' wing in the national camp). As agreed in November 1996, "Fatherland" was to enter the SND. This meant de facto capitulation for Rybicki, as he had to accept not only the statute, but also his partner's alien program line; the only success was the agreement that the leaders of Ojczyzna would be co-opted into the authorities of the united party. The congress of SN Ojczyzna on 15 December 1996 decided to self-dissolve.

== Electoral results ==
=== Senate ===
Election year	# of votes	% of vote	# of overall seats won
1993	15,958	0.12 (#32)	0 / 100
1993	As Fatherland - Polish List.		

== Ideology ==
The National Party "Fatherland" had a seemingly conflicting ideology, stating commitment to the (principally right-wing) National Democracy as envisioned by Roman Dmowski on one hand, and advocating anti-capitalism and left-wing, inclusive nationalism on the other hand. In its program however, the party made it clear that it strongly deviated from Dmowski's definition of 'National Democracy', which National Party "Fatherland" defined as the primacy of national interest, guidance of moral principles based on Catholic social teaching, and egalitarianism. In a complete opposite to ethnic nationalism of Dmowski, the party envisioned minority protection and special provisions that would reserve Sejm seats for ethnic and religious minorities proportional to their share of the population.

The party also greatly deviated from other "national-democratic" groupings through its focus. In case of SN„O”, nationalist rhetoric was very sparsely used and was mostly limited to the party's slogan "Be proud to be Polish". The party did not speak on cultural issues, and instead greatly focused on economic matters, which the "senioral party" was neglectful on. Here, the National Party "Fatherland" was consistently left-populist and attacked right-wing parties for promoting rhetoric that is completely detached from the life of an average Pole. In its program for Fatherland - Polish List, the party noted:

What effect can be produced by constantly talking and writing about the Jews? These are magic incantations. On the other hand, such rhetoric frightens away millions of ordinary people whose main problem is how to make ends meet. The national programme must therefore be first and foremost a programme for normal Poles, not for the haunted trackers of various conspiracies. (...) The leadership of the ZChN extends its right-wing hatred and dogma of anti-communism to the entire economic matter, i.e. walls, machines, and God-fearing workers.

National Party "Fatherland" promoted the view of the superiority of labour over capital and adopted left-wing slogans, such as supporting workers' strikes and trade unions. At the same time, the party argued that their views are rooted less in socialism and more in Catholic social teaching, although the party did not reject socialism outright. The party argued that economic actions must be assessed from the point of view of Catholic morality, as well as their on "the interests of the nation". The party spoke of "four dimensions" of economy - 'purely economic', social, national-political and 'religious-behavioural'. The party was very close to left-wing parties in its view that economic impacts must be analyzed from the perspective of social consequences.

The program of the party heavily spoke of Balcerowicz Plan, a neoliberal plan carried out by Leszek Balcerowicz that dismantled the socialist economy in Poland in favour of a capitalist free-market economy, with harsh deregulation, privatization and austerity measures. National Party "Fatherland" decried the plan as "economic genocide", pointing out that the plan resulted in full price liberalization together with monopolization of privatized industries, resulting in 'chronic cost inflation'. In regards to tariff liberalisation, the party decried the subsequent "collapse of Polish entrepreneurship and agriculture, unemployment, a budget meltdown and an outflow of foreign currency". According to its program, Balcerowicz Plan sold Polish industries to the wealthy few and large international companies, resulting in a "loss of economic sovereignty". The party also accused left-wing parties of failing to challenge the capitalist transition, writing that "The SLD-PSL coalition has run amok on privatisation".

According to the party, the capitalist transition had not only had negative effects at the macroeconomic level, but has also affected ordinary people. Here the party cited Archbishop Ignacy Tokarczuk, who stated that the burden of the transformation has been placed on the poor. Pensioners grew poorer, and the value of pensions has fallen sharply. The party also mentioned the farmers, who were pushed to the margins of society, arguing that the country has been "completely devastated by less than 5 years of transition". The party noted that all ordinary Poles had suffered from the capitalist transition, as they "have nowhere to live and no money to buy the most necessary products". The National Party "Fatherland" claimed that this was the intentional outcome of the plan, as "It is easy to govern a nation that is starving".

The party also held staunchly anti-capitalist views, arguing that capitalism as a system inevitably results in development of nomenklatura and 'stratification of society' where "the rich control the state". Polish political scientist pl:Jarosław Tomasiewicz notes Marxist undertones in the party's program, as the party reiterated Marxist thesis that the state is an instrument of the ruling class. National Party "Fatherland" in fact had contacts with Marxist economists such as Józef Balcerek, who was invited to write articles on behalf of the party for its weekly "Ojczyzna". The party also rejected the idea of "people's capitalism" which it defined as capitalism that aims to be based on social justice, such as social-democratic models. According to the party, any improvement coming from such models would be "microscopic" and temporary, and would in the long run fail to prevent consolidation of power by wealthy groups, along with 'social divisions'.

The consequences of capitalism were also criticized from the point of foreign takeover. Party activists argued that the transition was carried out to benefit foreign capital, concluding that Balcerowicz Plan was "economic aggression" against Poland. Marxist economist Józef Balcerek, writing for the party, wrote: "The main beneficiary of privatization will be foreign corporations, especially German ones. This will be the final blow to Polish industry in line with the will of the global financial oligarchy." The leader of the party, Rybicki, likewise wrote: "Privatisation is to make Poland a defenceless economic desert on which Western capital will expand." The party argued that capitalism "aims, step by step, to deprive Poles of their own economy".

Despite avoiding cultural issues, the party spoke on religion, arguing that "the Polish state must also be Catholic". In its program, the party wrote: "The [Catholic] Church should have its rightful place in public life. The state should not be indifferent or even less unfriendly towards the Church". Leader of the party, Rybicki, wrote that the party's vision includes "granting the Catholic Church, as an absolute majority, special rights and privileges". Commenting on the party's program, Tomasiewicz wrote that "the National Party "Fatherland", combining Catholic nationalism with a 'socialist' economic programme, appears to be a continuation of the National Workers' Party rather than the classic National Democracy."
