= Krzysztof Pawłowski =

Polish politician (1946–2026)

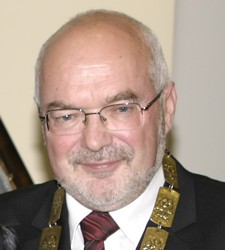

Member of the Senate of Poland
- In office 4 July 1989 – 31 May 1993

Personal details
- Born: Krzysztof Paweł Pawłowski; 26 June 1946 Nowy Sącz, Poland
- Died: 3 May 2026 (aged 79)
- Party: KO "S"; PChD
- Education: Jagiellonian University; AGH University of Kraków
- Occupation: Physicist

Krzysztof Paweł Pawłowski (26 June 1946 – 3 May 2026) was a Polish politician. A member of the Solidarity Citizens' Committee and the Party of Christian Democrats, he served in the Senate from 1989 to 1993.

Pawłowski died on 3 May 2026, at the age of 79.
