= Barbara Imiołczyk =

Polish politician

Barbara Imiolczyk
- Born: August 20, 1951 (age 75); Blachownia
- Education: University of Wroclaw
- Occupations: Politician, philologist

Barbara Imiołczyk (born August 20, 1951, in Blachownia) is a Polish politician. She was a member of the Sejm during its second and third term.

== Biography ==
Imiołczyk graduated from the Faculty of Philology at the University of Wrocław in 1976. In the early 1990s, she was the vice-president of Będzin.

She was a deputy to the Sejm in its second and third term, representing the constituency of Sosnowiec on behalf of the Democratic Union and the Freedom Union. She chaired the Local Government and Regional Policy Committee, among others.
