= Fatherland – Polish List =

Fatherland – Polish List Ojczyzna – Lista Polska (Polish)
- Founded: 30 June 1933
- Dissolved: 20 September 1993
- Headquarters: Warsaw, Poland
- Ideology: Left-wing nationalism Left-wing populism Anti-capitalism
- Political position: Left-wing
- Member: National Party "Fatherland"
- Colors: Deep blush

The Fatherland – Polish List (Polish: Ojczyzna – Lista Polska, OLP or O-LP) was an electoral alliance in Poland created by the National Party "Fatherland" (Polish: Stronnictwo Narodowe „Ojczyzna”). It was an electoral bloc that the National Party contested the 1993 Polish parliamentary election with. It unsuccessfully sought an alliance with a far-left agrarian socialist Self-Defence of the Republic of Poland.

In the 1993 Polish parliamentary election, the bloc was heavily undermined by the Catholic Electoral Committee "Fatherland", a political Catholic coalition headed by Christian National Union (Polish: Zjednoczenie Chrześcijańsko-Narodowe, ZChN), which aspired to be a successor to the Catholic Electoral Action, a National-Catholic bloc from the 1991 Polish parliamentary election. Ultimately, Fatherland – Polish List failed to win any seats, receiving 15,958 votes, 0.12% of the total.

== History ==
After the Polish Round Table Agreement and end of the communist period in Poland, Polish nationalist circles united to form National Party (Polish: Stronnictwo Narodowe, SN) in 1989, which was a reactivation of an interwar national conservative party of the same name, the National Party.

The party was then formally registered in 1990 and restarted political activities. In the 1991 Polish parliamentary election, National Party won 74.082 votes equating to 0.66% of the popular vote. Shortly after the 1991 election, the party grew divided as notable factions and tendencies formed within it.

Amongst the growing sectionalism, two 'tendencies' were particularly notable – the "blue" faction and the "pink" faction. The blue camp represented the traditional right and aspired to closely mimic the pre-war National Party, including supporting fully capitalist liberalism economy and rejecting the Polish communist period. In contrast, the 'pink camp' was considered a left-wing deviation, criticizing the blue party's line as being elitist and too clerical. The pink faction sought to focus on socio-economic issues and advocated state-owned economy, together with an expansive welfare state.

In February, Bogusław Rybicki, the leader of the pink faction, was expelled from the National Party, who was accused of being a communist civil servant. Several other activists of the party left the party in solidarity with Rybacki, and on 28 March 1992, they found National Party "Fatherland", which was to be a left-wing equivalent of the National Party.

The new formation reached 2100 members by 1993, and sought to run in the 1993 Polish parliamentary election. The party started talkings with Self-Defence of the Republic of Poland (Polish: Samoobrona Rzeczpospolitej Polskiej, commonly referred to as Samoobrona) in hopes of organizing an electoral coalition. Samoobrona was a far-left party; it became popular through its radical and aggressive agrarian protests, forming a paramilitary group "Peasant Battalions" (Polish: Bataliony Chłopskie), referring to a Polish agrarian WW2-era resistance movement of the same name, which protected farmers against bailiffs, evictions and police.

Samoobrona and its radical leader, Andrzej Lepper, gained widespread attention through controversial statements such as "We are a radical party, open to all disadvantaged people who are starving at home." and "If someone has a billion or two or ten, they really couldn't have made it through legal work" became widely reported and known." It had an unclear ideological profile; Polish political scientist Jarosław Tomasiewicz described it as a "radical-populist" party combined agrarianism, nationalism and "Soviet-style" communism.

Idiosyncratic views of Samoobrona, combined with their populism, left-wing nationalism and radicalism, were appealing to the National Party "Fatherland", which represented a left-wing splinter from a right-wing, radically nationalist party. Despite Rybicki's efforts, Samoobrona rejected the idea of cooperating with his National Party. Samoobrona would later drift further left and cooperate with more clearly left-wing parties through Social Alliance.

After the unsuccessful attempt to form a coalition with Samoobrona, the party decided to run in the election on its own, but open itself to cooperation with independent candidates and minor organizations through creating Fatherland – Polish List. This also allowed the party to distance itself from the 'main' National Party, which the party members considered too radical, especially in the wake of its 1991 electoral performance. Fatherland – Polish List was formally registered on 30 June 1993. It was located in Warsaw.

However, the electoral bloc was undermined by the creation of Catholic Electoral Committee "Fatherland" (Polish: Katolicki Komitet Wyborczy "Ojczyzna", KKW) in July. The KKW was led by National-Catholic Christian National Union and was a coalition of Christian-democratic and political-Catholic parties. It was largely based on the Catholic Electoral Action, a coalition from the 1991 Polish parliamentary election with similar program and purpose.

Unlike the Catholic Electoral Action, which was staunchly right-wing and National-Catholic, the Catholic Electoral Committee "Fatherland" sought to present itself as a moderate party and build a broad coalition of both churchgoing and moderate Catholics. The committee sought an official endorsement from the Polish Catholic Church, but the Church strongly emphasized its neutrality, a decision influenced by the controversy caused by the clergy's alleged support for the Catholic Electoral Action in 1991. In light of this, the KKW organized through parish councils instead.

The Catholic Electoral Committee "Fatherland" not only had an almost identical name to Fatherland – Polish List. National Party "Fatherland" and its allies strongly protested the "theft" of its committee and filed a lawsuit against the Catholic committee, but they were unable to hamper the KKW.

Ultimately, Fatherland – Polish List performed disastrously in the 1993 election, receiving only 15,958 votes, 0.12% of the total. Fatherland – Polish List was quickly dissolved after the election, and National Party "Fatherland" started disintegrating, with many of its members defecting to other parties, including Samoobrona. In 1996, the party decided to dissolve and return to its 'mother party', the National Party.

== Electoral results ==
=== Senate ===
Election	Votes	%	Seats	Government
1993	15,958	0.12 (#32)	0 / 100	Extra-parliamentary

== Ideology ==
Despite coming from a radically nationalist, right-wing background, Fatherland – Polish List put forward a leftist program that ignored cultural issues and focused solely on socioeconomic issues, together with somewhat inclusive, left-wing nationalist tone. The coalition was promoted an economy-focused, heavily populist rhetoric that distanced itself from the right:

The trouble with the national movement is that its rhetoric is completely detached from the life of the average Pole. What effect can be produced by constantly talking and writing about the Jews? These are magic incantations. On the other hand, such rhetoric frightens away millions of ordinary people whose main problem is how to make ends meet. The national programme must therefore be first and foremost a programme for normal Poles, not for the haunted trackers of various conspiracies.

Fatherland – Polish List argued that right-wing parties lack social sensivity, as they extend their "right-wing hatred and dogma of anti-communism to the entire economic fabric, i.e. walls, machines, and the God-fearing workers". It also attacked capitalism itself, arguing that it results in the development of nomenklatura and the 'stratification of society' where "the rich control the state". Fatherland – Polish List also rejected the concept of "people's capitalism" which was to be a market system based on social justice. According to the coalition, even a 'justice-oriented' capitalism would rapidly devolve into social and class divisions, and questioned the effectiveness of distributing the 'fruits of capitalism' to the general population.
