= Aleksander Gawronik =

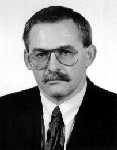
- Born: 30 August 1948 (age 78); Poznań

Aleksander Gawronik (born 30 August 1948 in Poznań) is a Polish entrepreneur, politician and senator of the eighth assembly in the Polish senate.

== Biography ==
He was active in the Polish Socialist Youth Union, in 1966 he graduated from the Evening University of Marxism–Leninism. During the communist period, he was an activist of PZPR and a full-time SB employee. In 1977 he graduated from the Faculty of Law in the University of Warsaw. In 1976, Gawronik resigned from the Communist Party and was dismissed. He admits being employed by Polish security services for 25 days. He was friends with Deputy Prime Minister Ireneusz Sekuła. In March 1989, shortly after agreements by the government of Mieczysław Rakowski he decided to open the exchange offices, and launched in many places on the western border the first network of currency exchange points in Poland.

In 1989 Alexander Gawronika supported the editors of the weekly Wprost, in exchange for the weekly advertising space for his businesses. In 1990, he was ranked first on the list of the 100 richest Poles of the Wprost weekly; in the following years he held twice the 6th place (1991, 1992), 22nd place (1993) and 92nd place (1994).

After signing the contract with the German company "Tax-free" Poles buyer of goods in Germany could in his company offices receive 14% of their value, as a return of VAT. Aleksander Gawronik launched the company "Sezam", dealing with the protection of people and property and organizing the escort of valuable shipments. In 1991 he became the manager of the Art-B company, previously managed by Bogusław Bagsik and Andrzej Gąsiorowski.

In early parliamentary elections in 1993, he was elected a senator of the third republic, running as an independent candidate. He co-created, among others with Zbigniew Religa, Independent Senators' Club. He sat on the National Economy Committee, Rules and Senate Affairs Committee and Subcommittee on Regional Policy.

== Penal proceedings ==
In 1991, officers of the Office of State Protection arrested him on charges of misappropriating assets worth approximately 7.6 billion złoty to the detriment of the Art-B company and seizing 10 billion złoty, which he allegedly illegally obtained from the company's debtor. He was released after three weeks on bail. His trial began in 1993.

In 2000, at the request of the prosecutor of the District Prosecutor's Office in Słubice, a search was carried out in the offices and warehouses of the company owned by Gawronik. In 2001, Gawronik was arrested and subsequently detained on suspicion of committing customs and tax fraud.

In 2004, the District Court in Słubice sentenced him to 8 years' imprisonment and a PLN 50,000 fine for defrauding over PLN 9 million in undue VAT. Gawronik pleaded not guilty, claiming that the fraud was committed by his employees. His trial for misappropriation of property to the detriment of the Art-B company concluded earlier, with a sentence of 3 years and 8 months in prison. He was granted conditional early release in 2009, 11 months before the expiration of his sentence. In 2011, he was sentenced to an alternative sentence of 350 days' imprisonment in exchange for a fine resulting from a different conviction. Gawronik was brought to serve his sentence in 2012.

In 2014, he was arrested in connection with the intent to present a plea of incitement to the murder of journalist Jarosław Ziętara. In 2015, the prosecutor brought charges against him in this case. In January 2024, the Poznań Court of Appeal acquitted Gawronik of the charge of inciting the murder of Ziętara.
