= List of Liberal Democratic Congress politicians =

A list of notable Polish politicians of the defunct Liberal Democratic Congress (Polish: Kongres Liberalno-Demokratyczny).

== A ==
- Tadeusz Aziewicz

== B ==
- Jan Krzysztof Bielecki
- Michał Boni
- Józef Borzyszkowski

== D ==
- Mirosław Drzewiecki

== G ==
- Witold Gadomski
- Andrzej Gałażewski
- Zyta Gilowska
- Cezary Grabarczyk
- Ryszard Grobelny
- Rafał Grupiński

== J ==
- Tadeusz Jarmuziewicz

== K ==
- Filip Kaczmarek
- Sebastian Karpiniuk

== L ==
- Janusz Lewandowski
- Krzysztof Lisek

== N ==
- Sławomir Nowak

== O ==
- Jerzy Orłowski

== P ==
- Paweł Piskorski
- Jacek Protasiewicz

== R ==
- Jan Rzymełka

== S ==
- Grzegorz Schetyna
- Tomasz Siemoniak
- Andrzej Sośnierz

== T ==
- Donald Tusk

== W ==
- Jan Waszkiewicz
- Jacek Wojciechowicz
