= Tadeusz Maćkała =

Polish politician

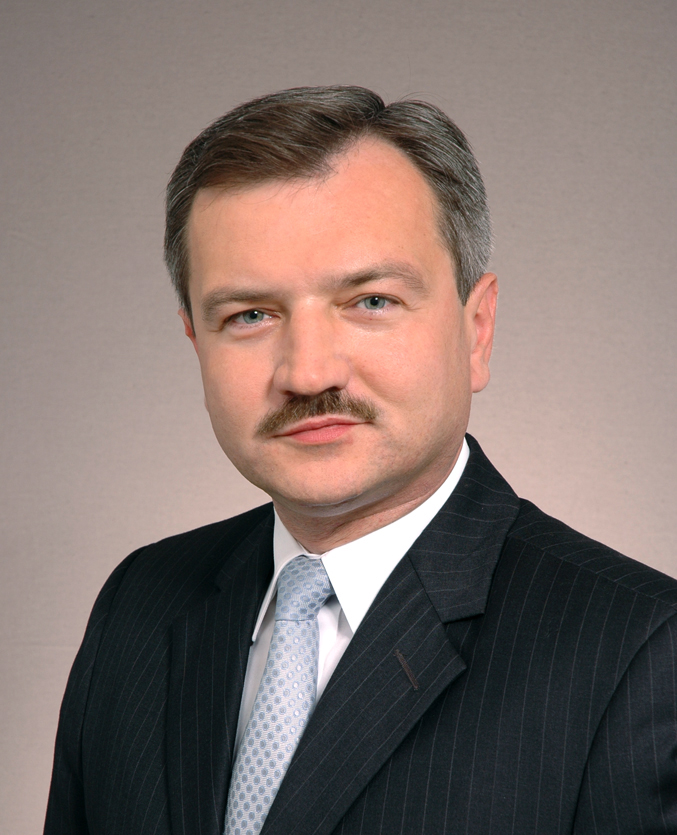
Tadeusz Maćkała

Tadeusz Maćkała (born 2 November 1962 in Lubin) is a Polish senator, representing Civic Platform. He is a graduate of Wrocław University. Between 1990 and 1994 he was the deputy mayor of the city of Lubin and afterwards, until 1998, mayor. While a student he was a member of the Solidarity trade union. He was also a member of the Party of Christian Democrats and later, the Solidarity Electoral Action. Subsequently, he was in the Civic Platform party, but was kicked out in 2006, for opposing other party members in Lubin.
