= Jerzy Osiatyński =

Polish politician (1941–2022)

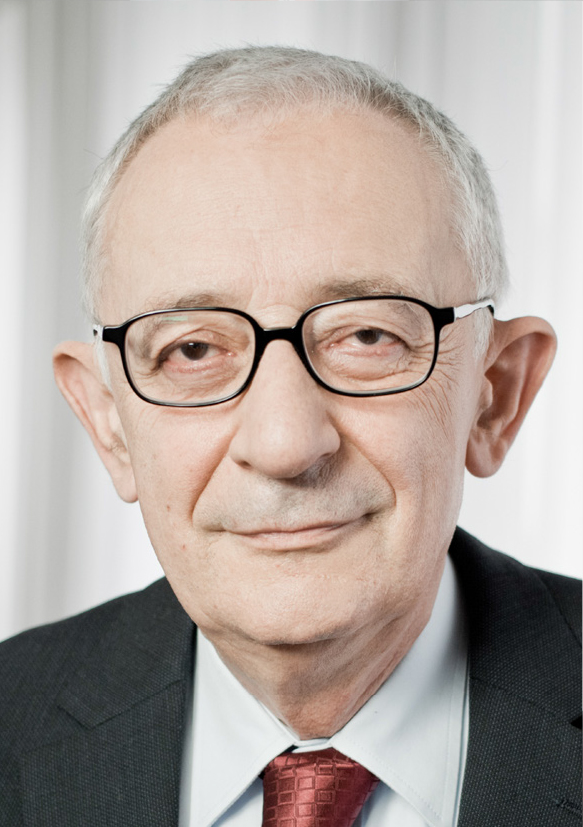
- Osiatyński in 2016

Minister of Finance
- In office 11 July 1992 – 26 October 1993
- Preceded by: Andrzej Olechowski
- Succeeded by: Marek Borowski

Member of the Sejm
- In office 18 June 1989 – 19 October 2001

Personal details
- Born: 2 November 1941 Riga, Ostland
- Died: 4 February 2022 (aged 80) Warsaw, Poland
- Party: UD
- Education: SGH Warsaw School of Economics

Jerzy Osiatyński (2 November 1941 – 4 February 2022) was a Polish politician. A member of the Democratic Union, he served in the Sejm from 1989 to 2001 and was Minister of Finance from 1992 to 1993.

Osiatyński died in Warsaw on 4 February 2022, at the age of 80.
