= Jarosław Ziętara =

Polish journalist (born 1968)

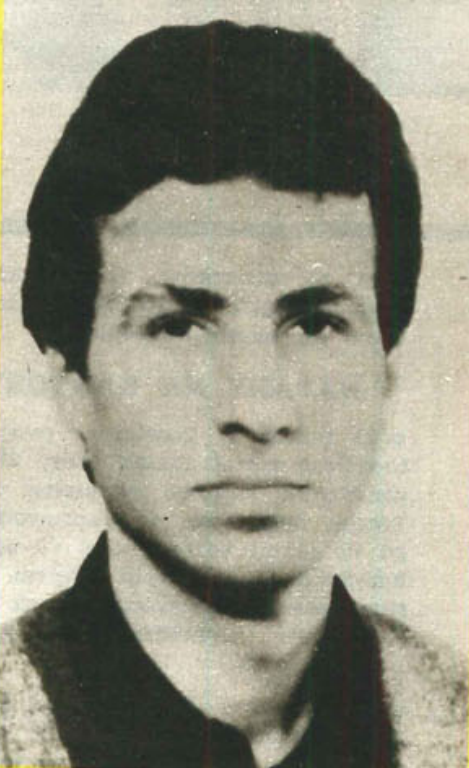
- Born: Jarosław Ziętara; 16 September 1968; Bydgoszcz, Poland
- Disappeared: 1 September 1992 (aged 23); Poznań, Poland
- Status: Missing for 33 years, 8 months and 13 days Declared dead in 1999 (aged 30–31)

Jarosław Ziętara (born 16 September 1968 in Bydgoszcz, Poland) was a Polish journalist who disappeared on 1 September 1992, and was most likely kidnapped and murdered. This is the only such case in the history of Poland after the end of the Polish communist system in 1989.

== Biography ==
Jarosław Ziętara was a graduate of Political Science and Journalism Institute of Adam Mickiewicz University in Poznań. He was a journalist of Gazeta Poznańska (he worked previously in Wprost and Gazeta Wyborcza), where he dealt among others with the investigative journalism, examining economic scandals. On 1 September 1992 he disappeared without a trace on his way to work. At the Municipal Cemetery in Bydgoszcz, there is a symbolic tombstone of the journalist.

In 1999 he was declared dead.

== Investigation ==
According to the findings of the prosecutor from 1998, Ziętara was kidnapped and murdered. The investigation into the Ziętara case had been, however, terminated in 1999, because his body was not found. The investigation led by the police, as well as the prosecutor, has been criticized repeatedly. In April 2011, editors in chief of Polish newspapers Fakt, Gazeta Wyborcza, Polska, Rzeczpospolita and Super Express had made an appeal to then-Prime Minister of Poland Donald Tusk to declassify information about Jarosław Ziętara that were collected by officials of Office of State Protection (Polish: Urząd Ochrony Państwa) and to then-Prosecutor General Andrzej Seremet to resume the investigation of the disappearance of Jarosław Ziętara. In January 2012, the investigation was reopened, this time for a homicide, not a disappearance.

On 31 December 2013, the Prosecutor General, at the request of investigators from the Appellate Prosecutor's Office in Kraków, extended the ongoing investigation into the murder of Jarosław Ziętara until 30 June 2014. In 2014, former senator Aleksander Gawronik was arrested on charges of inciting the murder of Jarosław Ziętara. In January 2024, the Poznań Court of Appeal acquitted Gawronik of the charge of inciting the murder of Ziętara.

== Commemoration ==
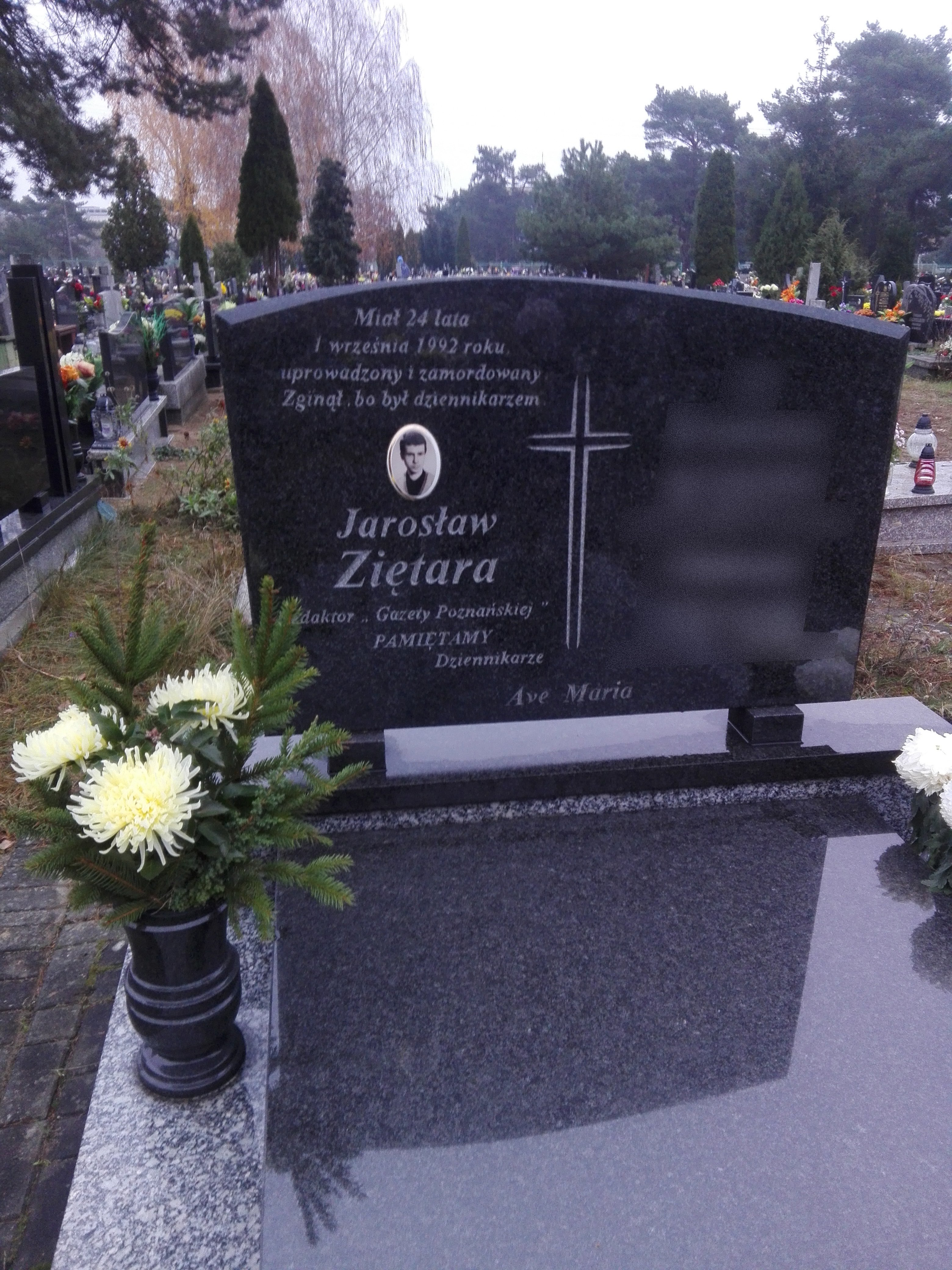
Ziętara's symbolic grave in Bydgoszcz, saying: He was 24 years old. On 1 September 1992 he was kidnapped and murdered. He died because he was a journalist.

Since September 2016 Ziętara is a patron of a small street in Poznań (Grunwald district) that was sectioned from Marcelińska Street. He has also been commemorated with plaques on the walls of: apartment building on Kolejowa Street, where the journalist was living (in 2016) and AMU Faculty of Political Science and Journalism (in 2022).

In 2022, Ziętara was posthumously awarded the Knight's Cross of the Order of Polonia Restituta.

== See also ==
- List of people who disappeared mysteriously (2000–present)
- List of journalists killed in Europe
