= Conservative Party (Poland) =

Conservative Party Partia Konserwatywna (Polish)
- Leader: Aleksander Hall
- Founded: 6 December 1992
- Dissolved: 12 January 1997
- Preceded by: Forum of the Democratic Right; Republican Coalition; Liberal Democratic Congress (Note: Upper Silesian-Dąbrowa Basin Conservative-Liberal Group, a faction of the Liberal Democratic Congress)
- Succeeded by: Conservative Coalition (minority, 1994); Conservative People's Party (majority, 1997)
- Youth wing: Forum Młodych Konserwatystów
- Ideology: Conservative liberalism Economic liberalism
- Political position: Center
- National affiliation: Catholic Electoral Committee "Fatherland" (1993); November 11th Agreement (1994-1995); Solidarity Electoral Action (1996-1997)

The Conservative Party (Polish: Partia Konserwatywna, PK) was a conservative liberal political party functioning between 1992 and 1997.

== History ==
The party was created on 6 December 1992 and formally registered on 19 February 1993. It was formed by members of the Forum of the Democratic Right, which functioned within the Democratic Union (Poland), activists of the Republican Coalition and Upper Silesian-Dąbrowa Basin Conservative-Liberal Group, a faction of the Liberal Democratic Congress. In parliament, its representatives (8 posełs, 6 from UD, 2 from KLD) joined the Polish Convention.

In the 1993 Polish parliamentary election, the Conservative Party started as part of the Catholic Electoral Committee "Fatherland", which gained 878,445 (6,37%), and did not cross the 8% electoral threshold.

In the Spring of 1993, the party joined the November 11th Agreement. In February 1994, a group of activists left the party, creating the Conservative Coalition. A year later in the presidential elections, the Conservative Party backed the candidacy of Hanna Gronkiewicz-Waltz. In 1996, it signed an agreement to work with the Freedom Union, but soon later joined the Solidarity Electoral Action.

In January 1997, the Conservative Party entered the Conservative People's Party, and dissolved itself.
