= Catholic Electoral Committee "Fatherland" =

Catholic Electoral Committee "Fatherland" Katolicki Komitet Wyborczy "Ojczyzna" (Polish)
- Founded: 13 July 1993
- Dissolved: 1995
- Ideology: Christian democracy Conservatism; Anti-communism; Agrarianism; Factions: Economic nationalism
- Political position: Centre-right
- Religion: Catholicism
- Members: Christian National Union (ZChN); Conservative Party (PK); Christian-Peasant Party (SLCh); Party of Christian Democrats (PChD); Federation of Polish Entrepreneurship (FPP)
- Colors: Blue; Red

The Catholic Electoral Committee "Fatherland" (Polish: Katolicki Komitet Wyborczy "Ojczyzna", KKW or Ojczyzna) was a conservative and Christian democratic electoral alliance in Poland. It consisted of five parties - the Christian National Union (ZChN), Conservative Party (PK), Christian-Peasant Party (SLCh), Party of Christian Democrats (PChD) and the Federation of Polish Entrepreneurship (FPP).

The coalition was based on the Catholic Electoral Action that participated in the 1991 Polish parliamentary election. In contrast to the 1991 coalition, the Catholic Electoral Committee "Fatherland" downplayed national-Catholicism in favor of more moderate image, and tried to attract centre-right voters. It failed to gain support of the Catholic clergy and tried to develop support bases in parish councils instead. It ultimately failed to cross the 8% electoral threshold for coalitions and gained no seats. It greatly contributed to the fragmentation of centre-right parties in the 1993 election.

== History ==
Catholic Electoral Committee "Fatherland" was founded on the 13th of July 1993 in Gdańsk, brokered by the Archbishop of the Archdiocese of Gdańsk, Tadeusz Gocłowski, with the intentions of garnering the votes of the Roman Catholic faithful. The electoral coalition initially sought to expand by the Polish People's Party – Peasants' Agreement (PSL-PL), however, the Peasant's Agreement rejected joining the coalition due to their resentment of PK leader Aleksander Hall and SLCh leader Artur Balazs. The possibility of the Centre Agreement and Movement for the Republic joining the coalition were also proposed, but quickly dismissed.

The politicians of "Ojczyzna", including the SLCh, counted on the discreet support of the Catholic Church during the election campaign. However, contrary to Ojczyzna's expectations, the Roman Catholic clergy largely refused to endorse any political party in 1993 (though some explicitly condemned the Democratic Left Alliance (SLD) - a notably anticlerical party), largely to the coalition's disadvantage, since, during the campaign, they were hoping to present themselves as defenders of the Catholic Church and protectors of the interests of Catholics.

The Catholic Church had no intention of getting involved in the election campaign. The Polish bishops drafted a pastoral letter that encouraged participation in the elections and stated in it that "bishops and priests do not engage in public party-political discussions, do not stand for parliament and do not participate in the election campaign, but they point out the moral principles and criteria that, in accordance with the teachings of the Church, Catholics should follow when choosing their representatives."

In view of this, the coalition tried to attract Catholic voters without the overt support of the Church by defending the presence of religion in schools, the Concordat with the Holy See adopted at the end of July, and acting in the constitutional debate to guarantee mutual independence. Krzysztof Oksiuta, the head of the electoral staff of "Ojczyzna" and at the same time a politician of the SLCh, also claimed that the coalition received offers of cooperation from lay Catholics during the election campaign: "Parish councils and other Church-related circles themselves are trying to reach us. They are looking for contacts, they come for leaflets. Priests ask us to come to a meeting, and in such cases candidates cooperate with priests".

In the 1993 Polish parliamentary election, the only election the coalition contested, they secured 6.37% of all valid votes. Unlike many other contemporary and future coalitions seeking to bypass the electoral threshold by registering as a party (and thus only needing to acquire 5% of the vote to enter the Sejm), KKW registered as a coalition, and thereby failed to pass the 8% electoral threshold for electoral coalitions, gaining no seats. Their failure to pass the threshold contributed to the SLD's landslide victory in the election.

The coalition received abysmal support in urban areas, and had some support in the countryside instead. It contributed to the fragmentation of the centre-right in the 1993 election and was found to have cost fellow centre-right parties support and seats, which led to accusations of the Catholic Electoral Committee "Fatherland" being a spoiler party.

The coalition survived until the 1994 Polish local elections, where the member parties run again under a joint electoral list named "Fatherland". They received 3% of all contested seats.

== Ideology ==
The coalition was classified as centre-right. In contrast to the Catholic Electoral Action from 1991, the Catholic Electoral Committee "Fatherland" tried to downplay its national-Catholic image in favor of a more inclusive coalition.

Amongst its main goals, the Catholic Electoral Committee "Fatherland" listed "an efficient and democratic state", the development of a market economy in Poland and respect for Catholic and patriotic values". The main slogan of the committee was "Poland first" (Polish: Najpierw Polska). Clarifying the meaning of its slogan, the coalition stated: "Our slogan is not directed against anyone, against any country. We stand for Poland as a general interest, and against group and class interests."

Other slogans that were used in the election campaign were: "Free enterprise and private property" and "State for the family". Leaders of the coalition emphasised that a comprehensive programme was being presented, proposing solutions in the social and economic spheres. The committee defined itself as one that is "not afraid of Christian values and want to be a force that clearly represents them". The need to adhere to Catholic moral values was presented as not only the matter of social conservatism, but was also referred to in terms of anti-corruption.

Explaining its economic slogan of "free enterprise and private property", the Catholic Electoral Committee "Fatherland" clarified that it envisions an economic policy aimed at "fighting unemployment, recognition of agriculture and agrifood processing as a strategic direction of economic policy" and proposed a "tax system conducive to economic growth, investment allowances, accessible credit and a reduction in income tax". Amongst the proposals of the party was also low-cost housing and special welfare programs for disabled people. During the campaign, the coalition summed up its economic goals as following:

- ensuring a fair standard of living for the rural population;
- stabilizing agricultural markets;
- ensuring affordable prices for the consumer;
- guaranteeing a steady supply of food to the domestic market;
- protecting natural resources of the land, air, and water in order to produce 'healthy food'.

== Electoral results ==
=== Sejm ===
Election year	# of votes	% of vote	# of overall seats won	Government
1993	878,445	6.37 (#5)	0 / 460	Extra-parliamentary
