= Zdzisław Czarnobilski =

Polish politician (1934–2026)

Member of the Senate of Poland
- In office 25 November 1991 – 30 May 1993

Member of the Sejm
- In office 18 June 1989 – 12 January 1991

Personal details
- Born: Zdzisław Adam Czarnobilski; 11 November 1934 Lwów, Poland
- Died: August 2026 (aged 91)
- Party: PZPR; PSL
- Education: Medical University of Lublin
- Occupation: Doctor

Zdzisław Adam Czarnobilski (11 November 1934 – 5 August 2026) was a Polish politician. A member of the Polish United Workers' Party and subsequently the Polish People's Party, he served in the Sejm from 1989 to 1991 and in the Senate from 1991 to 1993.

Czarnobilski died in August 2026, at the age of 91.
