= Peasants' Agreement =

Polish People's Party – Peasants' Agreement Polskie Stronnictwo Ludowe – Porozumienie Ludowe
- Leader: Gabriel Janowski
- Founded: 8 March 1992
- Dissolved: 15 January 1999
- Merger of: Rural Solidarity; Polish People's Party "PSL Mikołajczykowskie" and "PSL Wilanów" factions
- Merged into: Social Movement
- Ideology: Agrarianism; Christian democracy
- Colours: Green

The Polish People's Party – Peasants' Agreement (Polish: Polskie Stronnictwo Ludowe – Porozumienie Ludowe, PSL-PL), commonly known simply as Peasants' Agreement (PL), was an agrarian and Christian-democratic political party in Poland.

== History ==
The party originated from the People's Agreement, an electoral list consisting mainly of Rural Solidarity (RS) and two dissident groups of the Polish People's Party (PSL), the so-called "Polish People's Party (Mikołajczyk)" and the "Polish People's Party (Wilanów)".

The People's Agreement participated in the 1991 parliamentary election, obtaining 5.5% of the vote, 28 seats in the Sejm and five in the Senate. Subsequently, PSL-W's Henryk Bąk was elected Deputy Marshal of the Sejm and the group was part of the government led by Jan Olszewski, with RS' Gabriel Janowski as Minister of Agriculture.

The PL was formally established in March 1992, under the leadership of Janowski, who retained his job as Minister of Agriculture also in the government led by Hanna Suchocka, which included also PL's Zygmunt Hortmanowicz as Minister of the Environment and Jerzy Kamiński as a minister without portfolio. The dismissal of Janowski from the government in April 1993 led to the formal departure of the PL from the coalition, however during the no-confidence vote, only individual members of this party spoke against the government.

Due to several splits and internal disagreements, the 1993 parliamentary election saw the party's vote share fall to 2.4%. As it had failed to pass the 5% electoral threshold, it lost all its parliamentary representation. Following the election, the party disintegrated, although it was part of Solidarity Electoral Action in the 1997 parliamentary election and won three seats in the Sejm (including one for Janowski) and one in the Senate. In January 1999, during a congress, the party decided to merge into the Social Movement.

== Election results ==
=== Sejm ===
Election	Votes	%	Seats	+/–	Government
1991	613,626	5.47 (#8)	28 / 460	–	PC–ZChN–PSL-PL–SLCh (1991–1992)
1991	613,626	5.47 (#8)	28 / 460	–	UD–ZChN–PChD–KLD–PSL-PL–SLCh–PPPP (1992–1993)
1993	327,085	2.37 (#15)	0 / 460	▼28	Extra-parliamentary
1997	4,427,373	33.83 (#1)	3 / 460	▲3	AWS-UW (1997–2000)
1997	4,427,373	33.83 (#1)	3 / 460	▲3	AWS minority (2000–2001)
1997	As part of the Solidarity Electoral Action coalition, which won 201 seats in total.				

=== Senate ===
Election	Votes	%	Seats	+/–	Government
1991	719,778	3.14 (#9)	5 / 100	–	PC–ZChN–PSL-PL–SLCh (1991–1992)
1991	719,778	3.14 (#9)	5 / 100	–	UD–ZChN–PChD–KLD–PSL-PL–SLCh–PPPP (1992–1993)
1993	46,492	0.17 (#13)	0 / 100	▼5	Extra-parliamentary
1997	6,550,176	25.25 (#1)	1 / 100	▲1	AWS-UW (1997–2000)
1997	6,550,176	25.25 (#1)	1 / 100	▲1	AWS minority (2000–2001)
1997	As part of the Solidarity Electoral Action coalition, which won 201 seats in total.				
