= Ireneusz Sekuła =

Polish politician

Ireneusz Ludwik Sekuła
- Born: 22 January 1943; Sosnowiec
- Died: 29 April 2000 (aged 57); Warsaw

Ireneusz Ludwik Sekuła (22 January 1943 - 29 April 2000) was a Polish politician, party activist, in 1988 Minister of Labor and Social Policy, Deputy Prime Minister in the government of Mieczysław Rakowski and Member of the Sejm X.

== Biography ==
He graduated in 1965 in the field of psychology at the University of Warsaw, he then obtained a doctorate in political science.

In 1964, he started working at the headquarters of the Polish Scouting Association as a faculty instructor and then became the Director of the association. He directed the scouting action of the reconstruction of Frombork under the name Operation 1001-Frombork.

Between 1966-1972 he worked as a senior inspector in the Ministry of Machine Industry, and then until 1974 he worked in the Ministry of Labor, Wages and Social Affairs as a plenipotentiary of the minister for employment.

From 1966 he joined the Polish United Workers' Party, between 1974 - 1977 he was an inspector in the Department of Science and Education of the Central Committee of the PZPR.

From December 1983 to February 1988, he was the president of the Social Insurance Institution.

On 11 February, 1988, he became Minister of Labor and Social Policy in the government of Zbigniew Messner.

On 14 October, 1988, he became the vice-president of the Council of Ministers and chairman of the RM Economic Committee in Mieczysław Rakowski's government. He participated in the Round Table discussions in the team for the economy and social policy.

He was recruited to work for a security agency. After recruitment, he was directed to intelligence training. He participated in the practical comprehensive training "Zarys 73", covering the operation of AWO in the urbanized area. During the exercise he was a radio telegraphist. Over the following years he performed supplementary tasks. During foreign trips he collected information about a given country, including passport control procedures. Eventually, he was reclassified to so-called conspiratorial telephone (he mediated or potentially mediated in contacts between the AWO officer and his chosen agent). He resigned in 1989.

In the years 1989-1997, he held the mandate of a deputy to the Sejm, he belonged to the Social Democracy of the Republic of Poland.

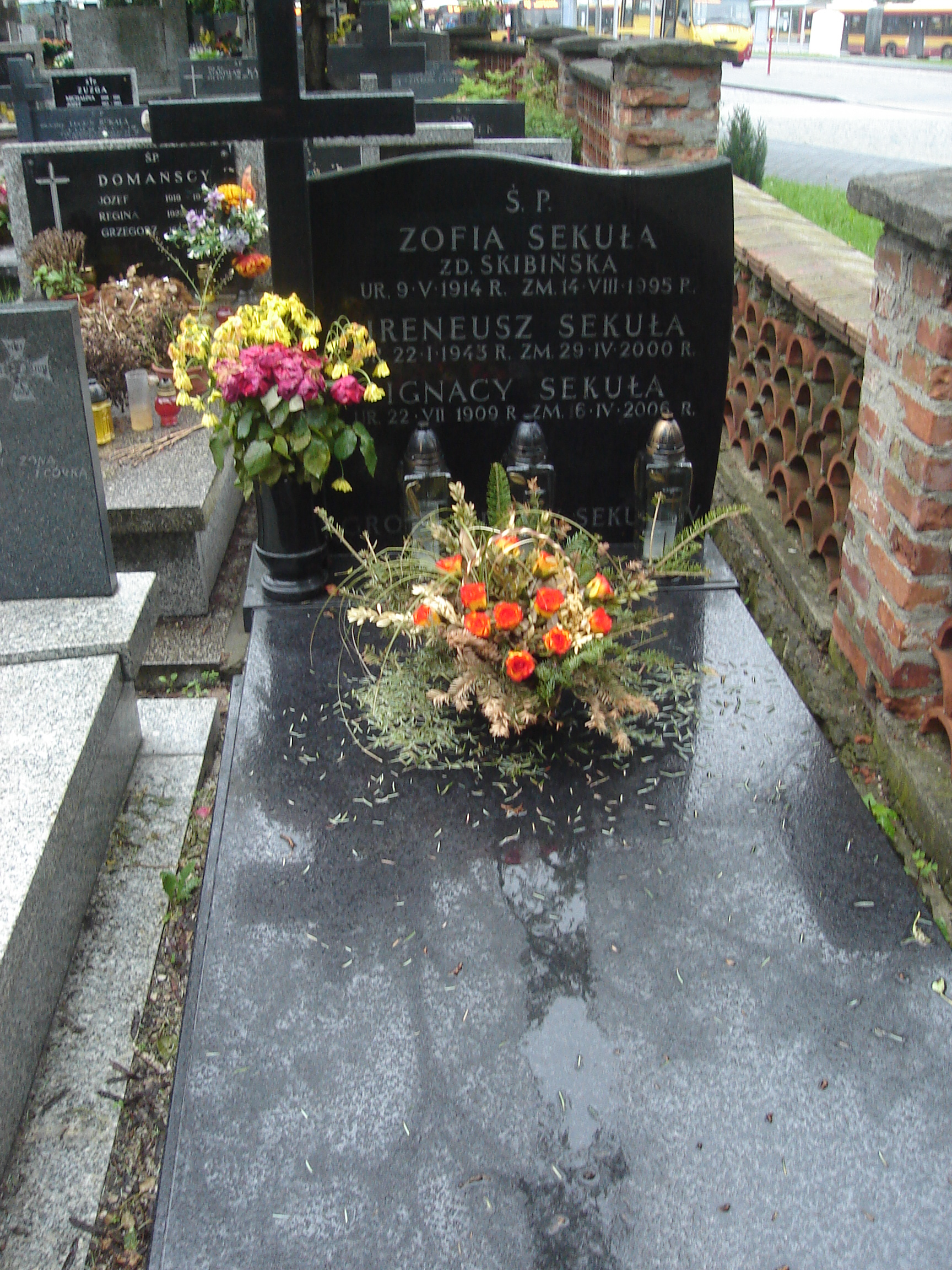
The grave of Ireneusz Sekuła

From December 1993 to March 1995, he was the president of the Central Customs Office. At that time, the prosecutor's office was conducting an investigation related to his interests in " Polnippona." The first attempt to waive the immunity in June 1995 at the request of the Prosecutor-General Włodzimierz Cimoszewicz was unsuccessful, against SLD and the Polish People's Party. Ultimately, his immunity was lifted in November 1996 and the applicant himself supported the request. In February 1998, the Wrocław prosecutor's office accused him of committing four crimes, including for acting to the detriment of the Central Customs Office and the "Polnippon" company, of which he was the president. In the parliamentary elections in 1997, the Democratic Left Alliance did not put it on its lists. On the night of 22-23 March 2000 he was found unconscious in his office in Warsaw. In a serious condition, he was taken to the hospital of the Ministry of National Defense, where he died on 29 April. He was buried in the cemetery in Wilanów.

According to the findings made during the investigation, it was suicide, Ireneusz Sekuła shot himself three times in the stomach, once missing. Due to the circumstances of death, however, various alternative hypotheses were put forward.

== Decorations ==
- Knight's Cross of the Order of Polonia Restituta (1984)
- Golden Cross of Merit (1979)
