= Federation of Polish Entrepreneurship =

Polish Christian democratic party

The Federation of Polish Entrepreneurship (Polish: Federacja Polskiej Przedsiębiorczości, FPP) was a Christian democratic political party in Poland.

== History ==
The party was established as the Christian Labour Party (Chrześcijańska Partia Pracy, ChPP) on 31 March 1990 by representatives of small businesses. It was part of the Christian Democracy alliance for the 1991 parliamentary elections. The alliance won five seats in the Sejm, with Józef Hermanowicz and Henryk Rospara of the ChPP becoming MPs.

In 1993, the party was renamed to the Federation of Polish Entrepreneurship. It was part of the Catholic Electoral Committee "Homeland" alliance for the 1993 parliamentary elections, though the alliance won no seats. In the late 1990s, it became closely aligned with the Movement for Reconstruction of Poland.
