= Liberal Democratic Congress =

Liberal Democratic Congress Kongres Liberalno Demokratyczny
- Abbreviation: KLD
- Leader: Janusz Lewandowski (first); Donald Tusk (last)
- Founders: Andrzej Voigt; Donald Tusk; Janusz Lewandowski
- Founded: 29 June 1990
- Dissolved: 23 April 1994
- Split from: Solidarity Citizens' Committee
- Merged into: Freedom Union
- Ideology: Neoliberalism; Conservative liberalism Pro-Europeanism
- Political position: Centre-right
- National affiliation: Centre Agreement (until 1991)
- European affiliation: European Democrat Union

Timeline of Polish liberal parties after 1989
• Citizens' Movement for Democratic Action /ROAD (1990–1991)
• Liberal Democratic Congress /KLD (1990–1994)
• Democratic Union /UD (1991–1994)
• Freedom Union /UW (1994–2005)
• Civic Platform (2001–2025)
• Democratic Party /PD (2005–2016)
• Palikot's Movement /RP (2011–2013)
• Your Movement /TR (2013–2023)
• Modern/.N (2015– )
• Poland 2050 (2020– )
• Civic Coalition (2025– )

The Liberal Democratic Congress (Polish: Kongres Liberalno-Demokratyczny, KLD) was a conservative-liberal political party in Poland. The party, led by Donald Tusk, had roots in the Solidarity movement. It advocated free market economy, individual liberty, European integration in the form of European Union membership, rapid privatisation of the enterprises still owned by the Polish state, and decentralisation of the government.

== History ==
The party was founded in 1990 by the faction of Solidarity that strongly favoured a free-market economy. Until 1991, it was a part of the Centre Agreement led by the Kaczyński brothers. In the 1991 Polish parliamentary election, KLD got 7.5% of the votes and 37 seats in the Sejm (total 460 seats). Composed of anti-communist neoliberals, the MPs of the Liberal Democratic Congress were heavily involved in the Balcerowicz Plan, a neoliberal "shock therapy" program which dismantled the socialist economy in Poland and introduced a free-market capitalist economy through radical deregulation and privatization measures.

Widespread public discontent with the Balcerowicz Plan and neoliberal policies caused the party's support to sharply decline. In the 1993 Polish parliamentary election, KLD got 4.0% of the votes and was left without seats. The party then became increasingly marginalized and struggled to find a role for itself in Polish politics.

In 1994, the KLD merged with the Democratic Union (Unia Demokratyczna) to form the Freedom Union (Unia Wolności, UW), preserving its liberal ideals. Former members, including Lewandowski and Donald Tusk, later joined the Civic Platform (PO) in 2001, where they shaped its moderate conservative wing. The KLD's legacy endures in Poland's market-driven economy, EU membership (2004), and the political careers of its founders. Donald Tusk, the KLD's final chairman (1991–1994), ascended to become Prime Minister of Poland (2007–2014) and President of the European Council (2014–2019), while Lewandowski served as EU Commissioner for Financial Programming and Budget (2010–2014), cementing the KLD's enduring impact on Poland's democratic trajectory.

== Election results ==
=== Sejm ===
Election year	Votes	%	Seats	+/–	Government
1991	839,978	7.49 (#7)	37 / 460	▲37	PC–ZChN–PSL-PL–SLCh (1991–1992)
1991	839,978	7.49 (#7)	37 / 460	▲37	UD–ZChN–PChD–KLD–PSL-PL–SLCh–PPPP (1992–1993)
1993	550,578	3.99 (#10)	0 / 460	▼37	Extra-parliamentary

=== Senate ===
Election year	Seats	+/–	Government
1991	6 / 100		PC–ZChN–PSL-PL–SLCh (1991–1992)
1991	6 / 100		UD–ZChN–PChD–KLD–PSL-PL–SLCh–PPPP (1992–1993)
1993	1 / 100	▼5	SLD–PSL

== Ideology ==
The party advocated individual rights and neoliberal reforms. The Liberal Democratic Congress was more radical on neoliberal economic postulates than the Freedom Union, postulating radical deregulation and arguing that "market rules took precedence of moral and political norms". The party postulated a capitalist state based on the promotion of free enterprise, privatization and the consolidation of private ownership.

The Liberal-Democratic Congress wanted to bring a "neoliberal and conservative revolution" to Poland based on the examples of Margaret Thatcher and Ronald Reagan. Economically, the party listed Friedrich Hayek, Ludwig Mises, Walter Lippmann and Raymond Aron as its patrons. The leader of the party, Donald Tusk, claimed that "the basic evil of communism was the omnipresence of state institutions" and that "progress will be evident in privatization". The party also considered itself liberal-conservative.

== See also ==
- List of Liberal Democratic Congress politicians
- Contributions to liberal theory
- List of liberal parties
- Liberal democracy
