= Christian National Union =

Christian National Union Zjednoczenie Chrześcijańsko-Narodowe
- Abbreviation: ZChN
- Founder: Wiesław Chrzanowski
- Founded: 15 September 1989
- Dissolved: 27 January 2010
- Headquarters: Warsaw
- Ideology: Christian democracy Nationalism
- Political position: Right-wing
- Religion: Roman Catholicism
- Colours: Blue

Website
- www.zchn.org.pl (archived)

The Christian National Union (Polish: Zjednoczenie Chrześcijańsko-Narodowe, ZChN) was a Christian-democratic and nationalist political party in Poland. Established on 15 September 1989, the party traced its tradition to the Solidarity movement (both the trade union and the Solidarity Citizens' Committee), as well as pre-World War II National Democracy and Polish Christian Democratic Party. The party adhered to the Christian right, advocating social conservatism. From its foundation until 1994, the party was led by Wiesław Chrzanowski, who was Marshal of the Sejm in 1991–1993.

== History ==
The ZChN was part of the Alliance for Poland, along with the Centre Agreement, and participated in all the governments from 1989 to 1993. In the 1991 parliamentary election the party obtained 8.7% of the votes. In the subsequent 1993 parliamentary election the ZChN, running under formed a broader electoral list and won 6.4% of the votes, falling short of the 8% electoral threshold for coalitions.

In 1996, the party was a founding member of the centre-right Solidarity Electoral Action. The coalition won the 1997 parliamentary election with 33.8% of the vote. ZChN was thus returned to the Sejm and took part to the government led by Jerzy Buzek from 1997 to 2001. In January 2001, when the Solidarity Electoral Action was transformed into a federation, the ZChN was one of its four member parties, along with the Social Movement, the Polish Christian Democratic Agreement and the Conservative People's Party. However, the coalition failed to win any seats in the 2001 parliamentary election, when it was reduced to 5.6% of the vote, due to several splits and the emergence of rival parties in the Solidarity tradition, namely the Civic Platform and the Law and Justice.

The ZChN continued as a mass membership organisation for a while, with 10,000 members in 2004. In 2007, most ZChN politicians joined League of Polish Families, but several of its members had already joined Law and Justice, a Christian-conservative party formed in 2001 by Jarosław Kaczyński and Lech Kaczyński from the ashes of the Centre Agreement (that was later part of the Polish Christian Democratic Agreement). The ZChN was finally dissolved in 2010. Today both Law and Justice and the National Movement claim to be successors of the ZChN. The former has most of the support of ZChN's previous members, however the latter has adopted most of its policies and declares itself the modern day version of National Democracy.

== Party presidents ==
- Wiesław Chrzanowski (1989–1994)
- Ryszard Czarnecki (1994–1996)
- Marian Piłka (1996–2000)
- Stanisław Zając (2000–2002)
- Jerzy Kropiwnicki (2002–2006)
- Jacek Szczot (2006–2007)
- Marian Papis (2007–2010)

== Electoral results ==
=== Sejm ===
Election year	Votes	%	Seats	+/–	Government
1991	980,304	8.74 (#3)	49 / 460	–	PC–ZChN–PSL-PL–SLCh (1991–1992)
1991	980,304	8.74 (#3)	49 / 460	–	UD–ZChN–PChD–KLD–PSL-PL–SLCh–PPPP (1992–1993)
1993	878,445	6.37 (#5)	0 / 460	▼49	Extra-parliamentary
1993	As part of the Catholic Electoral Committee "Fatherland" coalition, which did not win any seats.				
1997	4,427,373	33.83 (#1)	25 / 460	▲25	AWS-UW (1997–2000)
1997	4,427,373	33.83 (#1)	25 / 460	▲25	AWS minority (2000–2001)
1997	As part of the Solidarity Electoral Action coalition, which won 201 seats in total.				
2001	729,207	5.60 (#7)	0 / 460	▼25	Extra-parliamentary
2001	As part of the Solidarity Electoral Action coalition, which did not win any seats.				

=== Senate ===
Election year	Votes	%	Seats	+/–	Government
1991	1,995,866	8.71 (#5)	9 / 100	–	PC–ZChN–PSL-PL–SLCh (1991–1992)
1991	1,995,866	8.71 (#5)	9 / 100	–	UD–ZChN–PChD–KLD–PSL-PL–SLCh–PPPP (1992–1993)
1993	486,387	1.78 (#11)	0 / 100	▼9	Extra-parliamentary
1997	6,550,176	25.25 (#1)	3 / 100	▲3	AWS-UW (1997–2000)
1997	6,550,176	25.25 (#1)	3 / 100	▲3	AWS minority (2000–2001)
1997	As part of the Solidarity Electoral Action coalition, which won 201 seats in total.				
2001	6,582,224	24.34 (#2)	0 / 100	▼3	Extra-parliamentary
2001	As part of the Senate 2001 coalition, which won 15 seats in total.				

== Bibliography ==
- Maher, Joanne, ed. (2004). Europa World Year Book 2. Taylor & Francis. ISBN 978-1-85743-255-8.
