= Democratic Union (Poland) =

Democratic Union Unia Demokratyczna
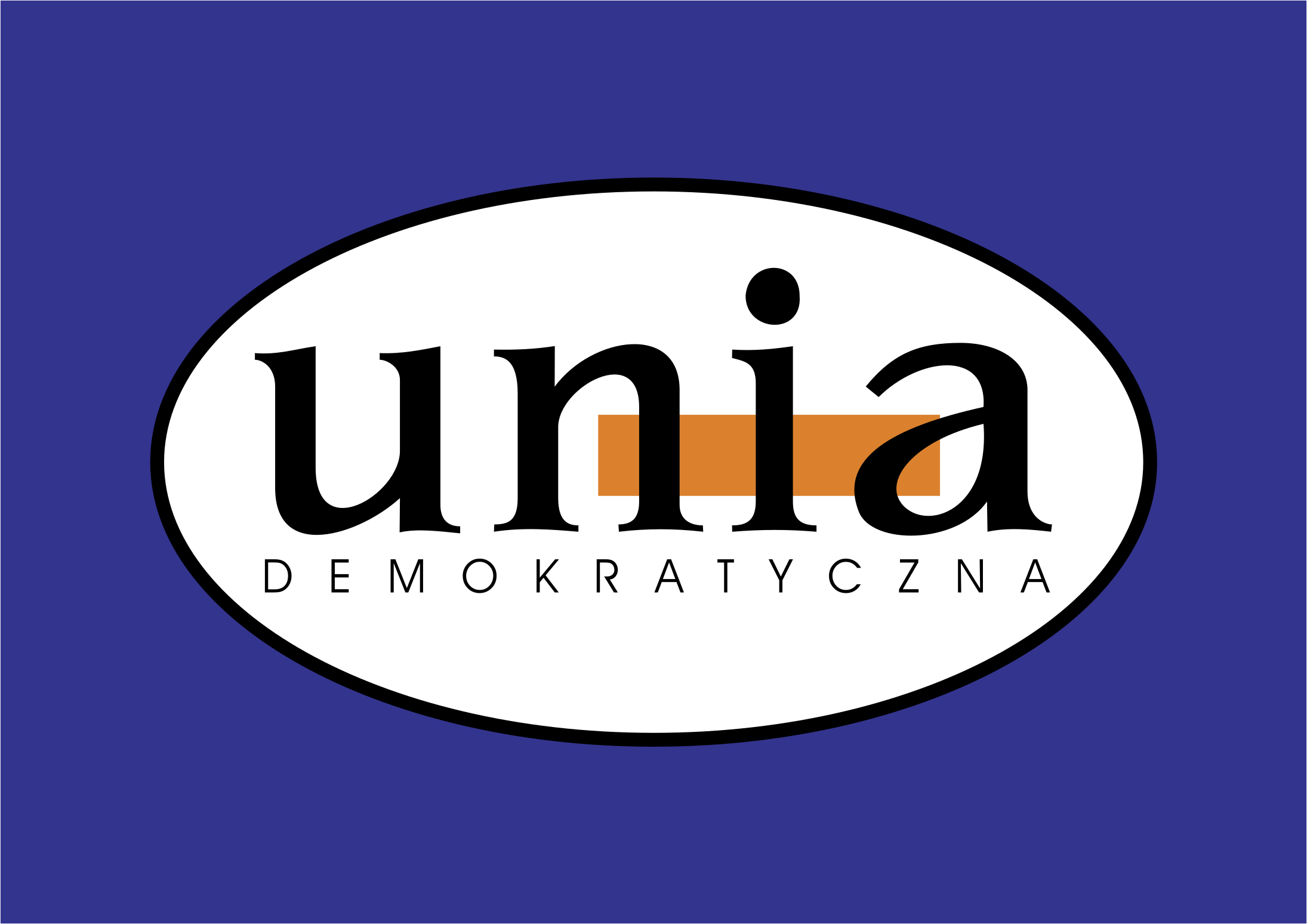
- Chairman: Tadeusz Mazowiecki
- Founded: December 2, 1990 (parliamentary group) May 12, 1991 (party)
- Dissolved: April 23, 1994
- Merger of: Citizens' Movement for Democratic Action; Forum of the Democratic Right
- Split from: Solidarity Citizens' Committee
- Merged into: Freedom Union
- Ideology: Market liberalism
- Political position: Centre-right

The Democratic Union (Polish: Unia Demokratyczna, UD) was a market liberal party in Poland. The party was founded in 1991 by Prime Minister, Christian Democrat Tadeusz Mazowiecki as a merger of the Citizens' Movement for Democratic Action (Ruch Obywatelski Akcja Demokratyczna) and the Forum of the Democratic Right (Forum Prawicy Demokratycznej).

Timeline of Polish liberal parties after 1989
• Citizens' Movement for Democratic Action /ROAD (1990–1991)
• Liberal Democratic Congress /KLD (1990–1994)
• Democratic Union /UD (1991–1994)
• Freedom Union /UW (1994–2005)
• Civic Platform (2001–2025)
• Democratic Party /PD (2005–2016)
• Palikot's Movement /RP (2011–2013)
• Your Movement /TR (2013–2023)
• Modern/.N (2015– )
• Poland 2050 (2020– )
• Civic Coalition (2025– )

The party presented a staunchly market-liberal platform, and was described as socioeconomically and socioculturally right-wing. Important members were Bronisław Geremek, Jacek Kuroń, Adam Michnik, Hanna Suchocka, Jan Rokita and Aleksander Hall.

In 1994, the party merged with the Liberal Democratic Congress into the Freedom Union (Unia Wolności).

== Election results ==
=== Sejm ===
Election year	Votes	%	Seats	+/–	Government
1991	1,382,051	12.32 (#1)	62 / 460	▲13	PC–ZChN–PSL-PL–SLCh (1991–1992)
1991	1,382,051	12.32 (#1)	62 / 460	▲13	UD–ZChN–PChD–KLD–PSL-PL–SLCh–PPPP (1992–1993)
1993	1,460,957	10.59 (#3)	74 / 460	▲12	SLD–PSL

=== Senate ===
Election year	Seats	+/–	Government
1991	21 / 100		PC–ZChN–PSL-PL–SLCh (1991–1992)
1991	21 / 100		UD–ZChN–PChD–KLD–PSL-PL–SLCh–PPPP (1992–1993)
1993	4 / 100	▼17	SLD–PSL

== See also ==
- Christian democracy
