= Solidarity Citizens' Committee =

Solidarity Citizens' Committee Komitet Obywatelski "Solidarność"
- Chairman: Bronisław Geremek
- Founded: 18 December 1988; 37 years ago
- Dissolved: 1996; 30 years ago
- Merged into: Solidarity Electoral Action
- Succeeded by: Democratic Union (Centrist faction); Centre Agreement (Conservative faction); Liberal Democratic Congress (Liberal faction); Democratic-Social Movement (Leftist faction)
- Headquarters: Warsaw
- Newspaper: Gazeta Wyborcza; Tygodnik Solidarność
- Ideology: Catch-all party Liberal democracy Christian democracy Polish nationalism Anti-communism
- Political position: Big tent
- Colors: Red; Orange (customary)

Civic Parliamentary Club Obywatelski Klub Parlamentarny
- Chairman: Bronisław Geremek (1989–1990) Mieczysław Gil (1990–1991)
- Founded: 23 June 1989; 37 years ago
- Dissolved: 25 November 1991; 34 years ago
- Headquarters: Warsaw
- Ideology: Catch-all party Democratization; Anti-communism
- Political position: Big tent
- Sejm (1989): 161 / 460 (35%)
- Senate (1989): 99 / 100 (99%)

The Solidarity Citizens' Committee (Komitet Obywatelski "Solidarność", KO "S"), also known as Citizens' Electoral Committee (Obywatelski Komitet Wyborczy) and previously named the Citizens' Committee with Lech Wałęsa (Komitet Obywatelski przy Lechu Wałęsie), was an initially semi-legal political organisation of the democratic opposition in Communist Poland.

Formed on 18 December 1988 in the premises of the Divine Mercy church in Warsaw, it spontaneously evolved into a nationwide movement attracting a vast majority of supporters of radical political change in the country after the conclusion of the Round Table talks (6 February–4 April 1989) and the announcement of semi-free general elections for 4 June that year.

The relaunched union weekly Tygodnik Solidarność, then edited by Tadeusz Mazowiecki; and the new Gazeta Wyborcza (today Poland's largest daily paper), edited by Adam Michnik and launched on 8 May 1989, became influential organs for the movement. Its name came from the independent union Solidarity.

== History ==
According to the Round Table Agreement, 35%, i.e. 161 out of 460 seats in the so-called "Contract Sejm" (Sejm kontraktowy), the lower house of the Polish parliament, were to be allocated by a free election. In the run-up to the election, the Citizens' Committee decided to nominate as many candidates in each constituency as there were seats democratically available. The Round Table Agreement also included the restoration of a less powerful upper house of parliament, the Senate, which had been abolished in 1946, to accommodate the opposition's demand for parliamentary representation. The new senate was to have 100 seats, all of which were to be allocated in a free election. The Citizens' Committee nominated a candidate for each seat.

"High Noon, 4 June 1989" by Tomasz Sarnecki was the Solidarity Citizens' Committee election poster

In its campaigning, the Citizens' Committee relied on its "Electoral Paper" Gazeta Wyborcza, and election posters printed mostly unofficially by an extensive network of samizdat print shops, which had been operating throughout the 1980s. Every candidate had an article in Gazeta Wyborcza and posters showing them with the figurehead of the opposition, Wałęsa. There were other motifs too, most famously perhaps the minimalist "High Noon" poster billing the election as the ultimate showdown between the government and the people.

Held in two ballots on 4 and 18 June, the election resulted in a landslide victory of the opposition organised in the Citizens' Committee, which won all 161 seats available to it in the Sejm, and 99 out of 100 seats in the senate. The one remaining senate seat was won by independent candidate Henryk Stokłosa. The Committee's candidates won by a large margin in all constituencies, frequently receiving more than 90% of the votes.

Independent, non-Committee candidates obtained a total of 40% of all votes not cast for the ruling Polish United Workers' Party and its affiliates. Even in this historic "showdown" election, the turnout was merely 62% in the first and 26% in the second ballot and low turnouts have remained a problem in all Polish elections since.

On 25 August 1989, the new "Contract Sejm" elected the Civil Committee's candidate Tadeusz Mazowiecki as Prime Minister, making him the first ever non-Communist head of government east of the Iron Curtain whereas the presidency remained in the hands of the ruling party.

As the Committee was not a typical political party but a rather spontaneously formed, loose organisation to facilitate and focus the opposition's pre-election efforts, it did not survive its own triumph for long. On 23 June 1989, the Committee candidates which found themselves in the Sejm formed the Citizens' Parliamentary Party (Obywatelski Klub Parlamentarny, OKP), which elected Bronisław Geremek as chairman.

However, political frictions soon occurred within the OKP. Eventually, two rival factions emerged from the OKP and its political milieu, namely a more conservative and populist wing which formed the party Centre Agreement (Porozumienie Centrum, PC) on 12 May 1990 led by Lech Kaczyński whereas the more liberal, intellectual wing represented by Geremek went on to form their own party called the Citizens' Movement for Democratic Action (Ruch Obywatelski Akcja Demokratyczna, ROAD), which later evolved into the Democratic Union (Unia Demokratyczna, UD), the Freedom Union (Unia Wolności, UW), the Democratic Party (Partia Demokratyczna (PD), also known as demokraci.pl, and, most recently, the Union of European Democrats (Unia Europejskich Demokratów, UED). The split between Solidarity's conservative and liberal heirs became evident in the 1990 presidential election, when the conservatives supported Wałęsa while the liberals nominated Mazowiecki as their own candidate. This cleavage continues to shape the Polish political landscape until this day, with the PC becoming the foundation of Law and Justice (Prawo i Sprawiedliwość, PiS) and the Civic Coalition (Koalicja Obywatelska, KO) tracing its origins to the UW.

== Election results ==
=== Presidential ===
Election year	Candidate	1st round		2nd round	
Election year	Candidate	# of votes	% of vote	# of votes	% of vote
1990	Lech Wałęsa (PC faction)	6,569,889	40.0 (#1)	10,622,696	74.3 (#1)
1990	Tadeusz Mazowiecki (ROAD and FPD factions)	2,973,264	18.08 (#3)	Supported Lech Wałęsa	

=== Sejm ===
Election year	Leader	# of votes	% of vote	# of seats won	+/–	Status
1989	Lech Wałęsa	16,433,809 (first round; contested seats)	71.28	161 / 460 161 / 161 (contested seats)	New	Opposition (1989)
1989	Lech Wałęsa	16,433,809 (first round; contested seats)	71.28	161 / 460 161 / 161 (contested seats)	New	In government (1989–1991)
1991	Marian Krzaklewski	566,553	5.05	27 / 460	▼134	Supporting government
1993	Marian Krzaklewski	676,334	4.90	0 / 460	▼27	Extra-parliamentary

=== Senate ===
Election year	# of votes	% of vote	# of seats won	+/–
1989	20,755,312 (first round)	71.29 (first round)	99 / 100	New
1991	2,219,160	9.68	11 / 100	▼88
1993	2,683,085	9.84	9 / 100	▼2
