= Christian-Peasant Party =

Christian-Peasant Party Stronnictwo Ludowo-Chrześcijańskie (Polish)
- Leader: Józef Ślisz (1991-1992); Artur Balazs (1992-1997)
- Founded: Spring 1989 (as PSL "S"); 17 May 1992 (as SLCh)
- Dissolved: 12 January 1997
- Split from: Rural Solidarity
- Succeeded by: Conservative People's Party (majority); National Party "Fatherland" (minority)
- Headquarters: Warsaw, Poland
- Ideology: Agrarianism; Christian democracy Conservatism
- Political position: Centre-right
- National affiliation: Catholic Electoral Committee "Fatherland" (1993)
- Colours: Green

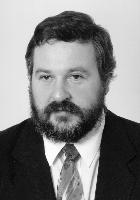
Artur Balazs, c. 1993

The Christian-Peasant Party (Stronnictwo Ludowo-Chrześcijańskie (Polish), SLCh) was a center-right agrarian Polish political party functioning in the early-middle 1990s, between 5 April 1991 and 17 May 1992 as the Polish People's Party "Solidarity" (Polskie Stronnictwo Ludowe "Solidarność" (Polish), PSL "S").

== History ==
Initially as Polish People's Party "Solidarity", the party was created in the spring of 1989 as a political branch of Rural Solidarity under Józef Ślisz. During the party's 2nd Extraordinary Congress on 16 May 1992, the party rebranded as the Christian-Peasant Party. In 1992, Artur Balazs, who was a representative of Rural Solidarity at the Round Table Agreement came to power in the party. In the Autumn of 1992, a "rightwing" splinter of SLCh defected to the National Party "Fatherland". On many issues, it closely aligned with the Conservative Party, which it later united with in 1997 to form the Conservative People's Party.

== Ideology ==
SLCh described itself as a center-right post-Solidarity party pledged to Christian and family values. It supported traditional multi-generational household farming, privatization involving a large amount of farmers, which would take control of the agriculture industry. It advocated for agrarian policies and government intervention in the matters of agriculture.

== Electoral results ==
=== Sejm ===
| Election year | # of votes | % of vote | # of overall seats won | Government |
|---|---|---|---|---|
| 1993 | 878,445 | 6.37 (#5) | 0 / 460 | Extra-parliamentary |
| 1993 | As part of the Catholic Electoral Committee "Fatherland" coalition. | | | |
