= Party of Christian Democrats =

Political party in Poland (1990–2000)

The Party of Christian Democrats (Polish: Partia Chrześcijańskich Demokratów, PChD) was a political party in Poland. The party was considered a right-wing rival to the Christian-Democratic Labour Party, considered the "left wing" of Christian democracy in Poland.

== History ==
The PChD was established in Poznań on 16 December 1990 by members of the Solidarity trade union and its political arm, the Solidarity Citizens' Committee. Its founding congress was held on 13 January 1991, with Krzysztof Pawłowski becoming party chairman and Paweł Łączkowski being appointed secretary general. In the 1991 parliamentary elections it received 1.1% of the vote, winning four seats in the Sejm and three in the Senate.

The party joined forces with the Christian National Union for the 1993 parliamentary elections, which they contested as the Catholic Electoral Committee "Homeland" but failed to win a seat. In 1996 the party joined the centre-right Solidarity Electoral Action, which went on to win the 1997 parliamentary elections, with PChD taking seven of the alliance's 201 seats.

In July 1999 an agreement was reached with the leader of Movement for the Republic to merge to form a new party. The Polish Christian Democratic Agreement was subsequently established the following September.

== List of MPs ==
Term	Sejm members	Senate members
1991–1993	Anna Knysok, Wiesław Klisiewicz, Paweł Łączkowski, Janusz Steinhoff	Jarosław Barańczak, Tadeusz Kamiński, Krzysztof Pawłowski
1997–2001	Paweł Łączkowski, Janusz Steinhoff, Franciszek Adamczyk, Andrzej Brzeski, Tadeusz Maćkała, Kazimierz Poznański, Maciej Rudnicki	
