= Centre Agreement – Integrative Initiative =

Centre Agreement – Integrative Initiative Porozumienie Centrum – Inicjatywa Integracyjna
- Leader: Wojciech Dobrzyński
- Founded: January 1995
- Dissolved: February 1998
- Split from: Centre Agreement
- Merged into: Conservative People's Party
- Ideology: Christian democracy Polish nationalism
- Political position: Centre-right
- Religion: Roman Catholic
- National affiliation: Nonpartisan Bloc for Support of Reforms (1995); Solidarity Electoral Action (1996)
- Colors: Red

The Centre Agreement – Integrative Initiative (Polish: Porozumienie Centrum – Inicjatywa Integracyjna, PC–II) was a Christian-democratic political party in Poland. It was founded by the former secretary and member of the executive board of Centre Agreement (PC) Wojciech Dobrzyński, who was stripped of his functions on 5 October 1994, and then expelled from the party by Jarosław Kaczyński in January 1995. Kaczyński expelled Dobrzyński over his willigness to cooperate with the right-wing Christian National Union, a party that wanted to create an All-Polish electoral alliance that would unite all right-leaning parties in Poland but exclude the PC.

In response, Dobrzyński founded the PC–II in January 1995, and pursued the creation of a big tent post-Solidarity bloc on his own. The party supported Lech Wałęsa in the 1995 Polish presidential election and entered the president's inner circle. In July 1995, Centre Agreement – Integrative Initiative participated in talks organized by Wałęsa's party, Nonpartisan Bloc for Support of Reforms, to create a coalition called National Concord Block (Polish: Blok Zgody Narodowej). Ultimately, talks failed when Wałęsa failed to win his second presidential term. In 1996, Centre Agreement – Integrative Initiative became one of the founding parties of the Solidarity Electoral Action and ran on its lists in the 1997 Polish parliamentary election. In February 1998, the party merged with the Conservative People's Party together with the Republicans (Polish: Partia Republikanie) of Zbigniew Religa.

== History ==
Starting in 1992, the Centre Agreement (PC) led by Jarosław Kaczyński, that sought to become the dominating Christian-democratic party in Poland, was rocked by splits as well as the conflict with president Lech Wałęsa. Internal fighting within the party escalated following the downfall of the government of Jan Olszewski, which led a group of Olszewski supporters (known as the "Christian Democrats" faction in the party) decided to leave the Agreement and form a new formation. Initially it was known as the Christian Democratic Forum, which on 30 December 1992 adopted a new name, hitherto only carried by its parliamentary representation: the Movement for the Republic (RdR).

The RdR parliamentary club included a group of 13 MPs from the PC, two from the Confederation of Independent Poland, one from the Silesian Autonomy Movement, along with 4 senators. In November 1992, Romuald Szeremietiew's small Polish Independence Party (Polish: Polska Partia Niepodległościowa), which had existed since the mid-1980s, joined Olszewski's formation. Two ministers from Olszewski's government also formed their own groups. Antoni Macierewicz, removed from the Christian National Union (ZChN) on 19 July 1992, formed the Christian-National Movement 'Polish Action' (Polish: Ruch Chrześcijańsko-Narodowy „Akcja Polska") (AP), which included two more RdR deputies supporting him (Piotr Walerych and Mariusz Marasek), as well as at least several dozen members of the party. The first AP congress was held on 27 February 1993, and already in June the grouping joined the RdR. Jan Parys, on the other hand, kept his independence by establishing - on the basis of committees created in his defence during the conflict with Wałęsa - the Third Republic Movement (RTR), registered as a party on 7 August 1992.

In September 1992, Olszewski and Parys formed the Coalition for the Republic, which was to form the nucleus of a future electoral alliance, but this did not end the disagreements between the former Prime Minister and Minister of Defence. The RdR, AP and RTR operated with very radical slogans, prominent among which were demands for lustration and decommunisation. The main object of their attacks, however, was not so much the post-communists as the President and the Democratic Union, considered the greatest threat. Harsh criticism of liberal circles was also the focus of the attention of "Gazeta Polska", a monthly and then weekly magazine sympathising with the RDC, edited by Piotr Wierzbicki.

Jarosław Kaczyński, after resigning from the Suchocka government, was now in conflict with all the leaders of the centre-right. Kaczyński continued his war with Wałęsa, and in October 1992, he decided to remove from the club a group of five MPs advocating the PC's entry into the government coalition. As a result, these MPs moved to the Polski Program Liberalny club, and Kaczyński's influence in the Sejm shrank. Kaczyński then entered a temporary agreement with RdR, as despite their split, both the PC and RdR were united with hostility towards Wałęsa. On 22 January 1993, a rally was held - under the slogan "Poland - time for change!" - a rally of at least 5,000 supporters of the PC, RTR, RdR and Freedom Party. During the march, Wałęsa was accused of collaborating with the Communist secret service in the 1980s. His effigy bearing the inscription 'Bolek' was burnt in front of the president's residence, and on 1 February, at a press conference, Jarosław Kaczyński explicitly demanded that Wałęsa resign, and proceeded to set up a special Committee for the Recall of the President.

Kaczyński's conflict with the president sparked what Polish historian Antoni Dudek termed McCarthyism, as Kaczyński would now unveil scandals and accuse his political opponents of collaboration with the fallen communist authorities. In June, Kaczyński accused Mieczysław Wachowski of taking part in an SB officers' course in 1975; the main proof of which was supposed to be a photograph - later shown on TV - of a group of its participants, with a person resembling Wachowski. However, the commander of the Lublin police, Arnold Superczyński, claimed to be the person in the photo. However, this failed to harm Wachowski's reputation.

In 1992, Wojciech Dobrzyński, the secretary and a member of the Centre Agreement's leadership, was accused of accepting a bribe from the company "Horn", in exchange for arranging its fuel import concession. On 26 February 1993, Dobrzyński was arrested, and this affair was heavily publicized by the media, having a negative impact on PC's image. However, in March 1993 Kaczyński disclosured a secret Office of State Protection (UOP) instruction of 26 October 1992 issued by the head of the Office, Jerzy Konieczny. It concerned the recruitment of 'personal sources of information' (i.e. agents), euphemistically called 'experts' and 'consultants', and its contents indicated the desire of the secret service to spread control over Polish political life. When the Sejm's Administration and Internal Affairs Committee referred the controversial Instruction 0015/92 to the Constitutional Tribunal with a request to examine its legality, the UOP leadership decided in May 1993 to repeal it. Dobrzyński was later released from custody, although the whole affair created a rift between him and Kaczyński.

Before the 1993 parliamentary elections, the PC negotiated the formation of an electoral coalition with various groupings, above all with the Third Republic Movement, the RdR and the Peasants' Agreement, but in the end, the party decided to run independently. In the 1993 Polish parliamentary election, the Centre Agreement failed to cross the electoral threshold and lost all its seats, which would prove damaging to the party as further splits emerged. Dobrzyński believed that the reason for party's failure was its refusal to work together with other parties, and initiated talks with other formations in order to secure a long-lasting agreement for future parliamentary elections. This move was opposed by the rest of the PC leadership, and on 5 October 1994, Dobrzyński was removed from his functions, and was expelled from the executive board of the party.

Dobrzyński continued his efforts to negotiate a coalition with the Centre Agreement, and he appeared in press conferences for the right-wing Christian National Union (ZChN). Kaczyński then expelled Dobrzyński from the party altogether in January 1995, arguing that while ZChN was planning to unify Polish anti-communist parties, it sought to explicitly exclude and isolate Centre Agreement. Shortly after his expulsion, Dobrzyński founded his own party, Centre Agreement – Integrative Initiative, where he wanted to unite fellow 'unity-minded' members of the PC.

Soon after, Dobrzyński and his party established friendly relations with the President Lech Wałęsa, in stark contrast to Centre Agreement, which remained in conflict with the President. In June 1995, the party became associated with the "official" grouping of Wałęsa, the Nonpartisan Bloc for Support of Reforms (BBWR). In June 1995, the PC–II led a meeting together with BBWR that sought to create a new centre-right Polish electoral alliance – the National Concord Block (Polish: Blok Zgody Narodowej). The meeting was also attended by the Confederation of Independent Poland, Party of Christian Democrats, Peasants' Agreement, RdR, the National-Democratic Party and the Party of Polish Democracy. Centre Agreement – Integrative Initiative also backed Lech Wałęsa in the 1995 Polish presidential election, who narrowly lost to social-democratic, former communist Aleksander Kwaśniewski.

In 1996, the party became one of the founding members of the Solidarity Electoral Action, which became a broad alliance of post-Solidarity parties, as Dobrzyński envisioned. Centre Agreement itself also joined the Solidarity Electoral Action, and both PC–II and PC fielded candidates on its electoral list. Despite being the leader of the PC, Jarosław Kaczyński himself refused to join Solidarity Electoral Action, and instead run in the 1997 Polish parliamentary election on the list of Movement for Reconstruction of Poland. Having entered the Sejm with a single seat, the Centre Agreement – Integrative Initiative participated in the party congress of the Conservative People's Party in late February 1998. The Conservative People's Party planned to create a grand conservative formation which would unite numerous minor movements. However, ultimately only two parties decided to join the party - the Centre Agreement – Integrative Initiative and a short-lived party called the Republicans (Polish: Partia Republikanie), led by Zbigniew Religa.

Shortly before the Centre Agreement – Integrative Initiative joined the Conservative People's Party, Jarosław Kaczyński left the Centre Agreement in January 1998, at the 4th Congress; Antoni Tokarczuk became the new chairman of the party. In the same month, Centre Agreement was removed from the register of parties of the Civil Registration Court. Later, in September 1999, another initiative to unite Polish Christian Democrats - Polish Christian Democratic Agreement (PPChD) - came to fruition. However, the formation of the PPChD did not lead to the dissolution of the Centre Agreement, but only to a split. Some activists from Warsaw did not accept the unification. President Tokarczuk moved to the new party, Jarosław Kaczyński and Ludwik Dorn returned to the old party. The party also returned to the name Porozumienie Centrum. On 8 June 2001, the party was registered as Law and Justice.

== Electoral results ==
=== Presidential ===
Election year	Candidate	1st round		2nd round	
Election year	Candidate	# of overall votes	% of overall vote	# of overall votes	% of overall vote
1995	Supported Lech Wałęsa	5,917,328	33.11 (#2)	9,058,176	48.28 (#2)

=== Sejm ===
Election year	# of votes	% of vote	# of overall seats won	+/–
1997	4,427,373	33.8	1 / 460	▲1
1997	As part of the Solidarity Electoral Action coalition, which won 201 seats.			

=== Senate ===
Election year	# of votes	% of vote	# of overall seats won	+/–
1997	6,550,176	25.25 (#1)	1 / 100	▲1
As part of the Solidarity Electoral Action coalition, which won 51 seats.

== Ideology ==
The Centre Agreement – Integrative Initiative was a centre-right party, slightly to the right of its original grouping, the Centre Agreement. It followed the tradition of Polish Christian democracy, which was the main ideology of the party. It also described itself as a Roman Catholic grouping.

The party was wary of free market and opposed to commercialisation and privatisation of state-owned enterprises, and lobbied president Wałęsa to veto such bills in 1995. It also described itself as a nationalist party, and proposed the idea of a "patriotic front".
