= Third Republic Movement =

Third Republic Movement Ruch Trzeciej Rzeczypospolitej (Polish)
- Leader: Jan Parys
- Founded: April 1992
- Dissolved: 11 November 1995
- Split from: Centre Agreement
- Succeeded by: Movement for the Reconstruction of Poland
- Headquarters: Warsaw, Poland
- Membership (1993): >5000
- Ideology: Conservatism; Polish nationalism Anti-communism; Economic liberalism Militarism
- Political position: Right-wing
- National affiliation: Centre Agreement – Polish Union (1993)
- Colours: Red
- Slogan: Let's build the Third Republic, soundly, wisely, as one! (Polish: Twórzmy Trzecią Rzeczypospolitą, wytrwale, mądrze, razem!)

The Third Republic Movement (Polish: Ruch Trzeciej Rzeczypospolitej, RTR, self-styled as R III R) was a minor conservative political party in Poland functioning between 1992 and 1995, when it united with the Movement for the Republic to form the Movement for the Reconstruction of Poland.

== History ==
=== Country Defence Committees ===
The Movement was founded by Minister of Defence Jan Parys in April 1992, based on "Country Defence Committees" (Polish: Komitety Obrony Państwa), following a meeting with the Polish General Staff, during an ongoing conflict between Parys and President Lech Wałęsa, whom Parys accused of attempting to manipulate the Polish military. During a meeting of the Congress of National Solidarity on April 30 1992, it referred to the Macierewicz List, a product of lustration in Poland, as a "list of disgraced nationals". On May 2 1992, the Movement petitioned Prime Minister Jan Olszewski to oppose Wałęsa's plans of strengthening the role of the presidency in Poland.

=== Third Republic Movement ===
The Movement was formally registered on August 7 1992, during the organization's 2nd Congress. Therein, it drafted the party's political manifesto, and adapted six resolutions.:

- recognizing the removal of Olszewski's cabinet as bordering on being a coup d'etat
- calling for the immediate resignation or removal of Lech Wałęsa from the presidency
- calling for the Senate to condemn the functioning of the Sejm, and to investigate whether its actions are constitutional
- demanding for the decommunisation of the means of mass communication, especially Polish national television and the Polish Press Agency
- calling for the revealing of the list of all Security Office and Security Service agents since 1944
- demanding early parliamentary and presidential elections

On August 10 1992, it adopted a "Declaration of Cooperation" with FChD, ChD-SP, PPN and ChD FL. The parties organized press conferences and street demonstrations. A 3rd Congress of the Movement was held on June 12 1993. For the 1993 Polish parliamentary election, it started under Lech and Jarosław Kaczyński's Centre Agreement – Polish Union coalition, which got 4.42% of valid votes failed to cross the electoral threshold. Parys briefly considered running for president in 1995, but endorsed Jan Olszewski instead.

On November 11, 1995, RTR united with Olszewski's Movement for the Republic to form the Movement for the Reconstruction of Poland.

== Ideology ==
The Movement was radically anti-communist, supporting lustration, decommunisation, disenfranchising all Polish citizens involved with the communist Security Service or communist-era nomenklatura. It accused the Cabinet of Hanna Suchocka of not being Atlanticist enough and Wałęsa of planning to keep power by force.

Economically, it supported free market economics, private ownership, privatization and integration with the European Union. It praised the economic reforms of Margaret Thatcher. In terms of foreign policy, it supported the creation of a strong army and joining NATO, encouraging caution against Russia, denying the notion of a third way or compromise between the "western" and "eastern" spheres. It called for closer cooperation with Poland's neighbours – especially Slovakia, Hungary, the Czech Republic and Ukraine.

To achieve its goals, the Movement sought to create a united front of rightwing political parties, consisting of the Movement itself, Real Politics Union, Centre Agreement, Movement for the Republic, National Christian Movement "Polish Action", National Party, Christian National Union, Peasants' Agreement and Labour Party.

It based itself on "rightwing-conservative" ideals, which it described as:

- Polish indepdendence
- Christian morality
- Private ownership
- Free market economy
- Equality under the law
- Individual personal freedoms
- Democratic electoral rules
- Acknowledging the role of the family and the need for a country with strong, but not absolute, powers

== Leadership ==
The Movement was divided into several bodies: the Presidium of Management, Supreme Committee, Revisional Commission and Disciplinary Court.

The Presidium of Management consisted of chairman Jan Parys, vice-chairmen Tadeusz Stański and Waldemar Pernach, secretary Marian Bąkowski and treasurer Jan Laskowski.

== Electoral results ==
=== Sejm ===
Election	# of votes	% of votes	# of overall seats won	Government
1993	609,973	4.42 (#9)	0 / 460	Extra-parliamentary
1993	As part of the PC-ZP coalition.			

=== Presidential ===
Election year	Candidate	1st round	
Election year	Candidate	# of overall votes	% of overall vote
1995	Supported Jan Olszewski	1,225,453	6.86 (#4)
