= Polish Popular-Christian Forum "Patrimony" =

Political party in Poland

Polish Popular-Christian Forum "Patrimony" Polskie Forum Ludowo-Chrześcijańskie „Ojcowizna”
- Abbreviation: PFLCh „Ojcowizna”
- Leader: Roman Bartoszcze; Leszek Murzyn; Paweł Murzyn
- Founder: Roman Bartoszcze
- Founded: 11 June 1991
- Registered: 10 July 1991
- Split from: Polish People's Party
- Ideology: Christian democracy Christian nationalism Economic patriotism Conservatism; Agrarianism
- Political position: Right-wing
- Religion: Roman Catholic
- Colours: Green; Red
- Slogan: Our home, family, homeland (Polish: Nasz dom, rodzina, ojczyzna)
- Politics of Poland; Political parties; Elections; Alternative logo of the party.

The Polish Popular-Christian Forum "Patrimony" (Polish: Polskie Forum Ludowo-Chrześcijańskie „Ojcowizna”, PFLCh "Ojcowizna"), also known as the Polish Party "Patrimony" (Polish: Polska Partia „Ojcowizna”) between 14 January 1992 and 1998, is an agrarian political party in Poland. It was founded by Roman Bartoszcze and Leszek Murzyn after the former was ousted from party leadership in the Polish People's Party in June 1991, and cofounded with Stanisław Majdański and Leszek Murzyn. It was deregistered as a party in 1998, and refounded as an association on 15 October 2004 by Leszek Murzyn.

== History ==
=== Polish People's Party split ===
The Polish Popular-Christian Forum "Patrimony" was founded by Roman Bartoszcze, who was the leader of the Polish People's Party (PSL) between 1990 and 1991. Bartoszcze became the leader of the Polish People's Party at the time when the party was split between two currents, the Solidarność current represented by Artur Balazs, Gabriel Janowski, Jan Kułaj, Józef Ślisz which followed the legacy of Wincenty Witos and the interwar Polish People's Party "Piast", and the post-communist current represented by former members of the United People's Party, which was part of the communist ruling coalition in the Polish People's Republic. Bartoszcze was an anti-communist activist, but he also had good relations with trade unions, and was deemed a conciliatory candidate that would implemented a "thaw" in the Polish People's Party while also reconciling both anti-communist and pro-communists wings of the party.

However, Bartoszcze sought to base the re-emerging Polish People's Party on the interwar traditions and the legacy of Stanisław Mikołajczyk. On 17 April 1991, Bartoszcze signed an agreement to form the National Election Committee of the Agrarian Movement (Polish: Krajowy Komitet Wyborczy Ruchu Ludowego, KKWRL) together with Rural Solidarity led by Gabriel Janowski and a splinter party Polish People's Party "Solidarity" led by Józef Ślisz. This agreement assumed that all three organizations would have an equal amount of representatives in the structures of the KKWRL, which caused an outrage amongst the post-communist faction of the Polish People's Party. On 29 May 1991, activists of the party's Supreme Council gathered around Roman Jagieliński suspended Bartoszcze from his duties as the party leader and convened an Extraordinary Congress on 29 June 1991, at which Bartoszcze was dismissed from his position. The new leader of the party became Waldemar Pawlak, while Bartoszcze and his small group of followers were expelled from the party, which led to the creation of the Polish Popular-Christian Forum "Patrimony". The Polish People's Party then aligned itself closer with its post-communist roots, embracing agrarian socialism. The expulsion of Bartoszcze also led 8 PSL MPs to leave their party's parliamentary group and form their own - the Christian-Agrarian Parliamentary Club (Polish: Parlamentarny Klub Chrześcijańsko-Ludowy), which then became the official parliamentary club of the party.

=== 1990s activities ===
The decision to found the party was made on 11 June 1991 when Bartoszcze was discussing his looming removal from the Polish People's Party with Leszek Murzyn. On 10 July, Bartoszcze invited 21 of his closest associated to register a new party. On 19 July 1991, Bartoszcze registered the PFLCh "Ojcowizna" together with Murzyn. The party had a conservative and agrarian character. It was dedicated to Catholicism and Catholic social teaching, and it even had its own chaplain - the Catholic canon priest Kazimierz Puchała. It was a small party, and struggled to stand out from other parties that referred to agrarian and Christian traditions in Poland. However, the party was able to win seats in the 1991 Polish parliamentary election as a part of the Center Civic Alliance. However, political commentators observed that ‘the alliance between the PC and Roman Bartoszcze's Ojcowizna is a fiction, because seven of its activists are running on the Peasants' Agreement list.’ The party won 2 seats in total on the lists of the Center Civic Alliance - one by Roman Bartoszcze, and another one by Marek Dziubek. The party's name, "Patrimony", refers to the national inheritance of individual generational wealth, family traditions, labour and spirituality. On 14 January 1992, the party changed its name from Polish Popular-Christian Forum "Patrimony" to Polish Party "Patrimony".

After the 1991 elections, the party would partake in numerous political alliances and coalitions. In the 1993 Polish parliamentary election and 1995 Polish presidential election, the party closely aligned with the Movement for the Republic and its leader, Jan Olszewski, running in the Coalition for the Republic coalition and endorsing its leader's presidential campaign. However, the Coalition for the Republic fell under the 5% threshold, winning no seats. In the 2001 Polish parliamentary election, the party organized a "patriotic front" to unite behind the electoral list of the League of Polish Families; two members of the Polish Popular-Christian Forum "Patrimony", the party's co-founder Leszek Murzyn as well as Grzegorz Górniak, successfully won two seats on behalf of the League of Polish Families.

=== 2000s activities ===
In the 2002 Polish local elections, the "patriotic front" was continued, and the Polish Popular-Christian Forum "Patrimony" signed an agreement with the League of Polish Families and smaller parties such as the Movement for Reconstruction of Poland on 11 November 2001 to form joint electoral lists for the local elections. In April 2002, the party organized a protest together with right-wing parties such as Confederation of Independent Poland and the Movement for Reconstruction of Poland, which protested the privatization and European integration pursued by the government led by Democratic Left Alliance. The protests was organized in the defense of "pensioners, retirees, students, workers, policemen and the unemployed"; the protesters met with the then vice-voivode of the Lesser Poland Voivodeship, Andrzej Harężlak.

The party ran together with the League of Polish Families again in the 2005 Polish parliamentary election, where Murzyn maintained his seat until the 2007, while Górniak defected to Ancestral Home, a breakaway party from the League of Polish Families that unsuccessfully contested the 2005 election as well. In the 2007 Polish parliamentary election, Murzyn once more ran on the list of League of Polish Families, but he failed to gain a seat as the party fell below the 5% electoral threshold. After 2007, the party never held a seat in the Sejm again, but it remained active as a political association - as of 2011, its members were in local agrarian organizations and councils. In 2013, the party published a statement in support of the Catholic clergy that promoted opposition to in-vitro fertilization and called opposition to it a responsibility of all Christian politicians. The party concluded that "truth cannot be “voted out,” that there are values that cannot be compromised in the heart of a Christian."

=== Later activities ===
The party ran in the 2010 Polish local elections on the list of Right Wing of the Republic, where the party's members and party-endorsed candidates took priority places on the electoral list. In the 2010 Polish presidential election, the party endorsed the candidacy of Marek Jurek, the leader of the Right Wing of the Republic, and Roman Bartoszcze became a staff member of Jurek's electoral committee. In 2016, Bartoszcze died after long illness, and was buried in Inowrocław. In 2019, the party stated its support for the Archbishop of Kraków Marek Jędraszewski, who became controversial for his denouncements of 'gender ideology' and warning against a "rainbow-coloured red plague". In its declaration, the party stated: "We express our firm opposition to any attempts to reject ethics and the social order built on the basis of natural law. This order is presented by radical representatives of liberal and leftist circles as an archaic relic." After Leszek Murzyn's death in 2021, the association was taken over by his son, Paweł Murzyn, a sympathiser of the Confederation of the Polish Crown, who contested the 2024 election to the Powiat council in Myślenice for the Confederation Liberty and Independence, failing to gain a seat. In 2024, it joined an appeal of pro-life groups against the "morning-after pill".

== Ideology ==
The party had been described as conservative and agrarian, as well as Christian democratic. It was also considered a right-wing party that promoted economic patriotism. In its ideological roots, it was a peasant party and represented the broad peasant movement in Poland. It was also closely associated with the Movement for the Republic, a Christian-nationalist party. Within the Center Civic Alliance, Polish Popular-Christian Forum "Patrimony" postulated abandonment of the neoliberal Balcerowicz Plan, fight with corruption and crime, a decommunisation law, and Polish membership in the North Atlantic Treaty and the European Economic Community.

Polish Popular-Christian Forum "Patrimony" is strongly opposed to abortion, condemning it as "moral nihilism" and "the revolution of the civilization of death". The party also participated in a declaration against the emergency contraception "morning-after" pills. It supported the Archbishop of Kraków Marek Jędraszewski in his condemnation of 'gender ideology', with the party releasing a statement condemning "any attempts to reject ethics and social order based on natural law" and denouncing "radical representatives of liberal and left-wing circles", stating that "no system can function for long by rejecting natural law". The party is devotedly Catholic, and had its own chaplain - the Catholic priest of Gruszow Kazimierz Puchała, who was a personal friend of Bartoszcze. In its statement from 2013, the party wrote:

We express our expectation for words of truth that will help many faithful recognise the clear path in times when all values are relativised and anti-values become virtues. We also assure that we will not allow a situation in which isolated clergy members are left without support from the faithful. For us, there is only one Church.

Between 2001 and 2007, the party cooperated with League of Polish Families, forming a "patriotic front" of smaller parties to join the electoral lists of the League of Polish Families, and organizing protests. The party was particularly critical of the government of Leszek Miller, and strongly opposed neoliberal policies such as privatisation and European integration. Polish Popular-Christian Forum "Patrimony" demanded an expansion of medicine types covered by the state welfare net, restoration of student discounts for train travel, reversing pro-employer amendments to the Labour Code, and restricting the expansion of hypermarkets in Poland. Other proposals of the party included increasing spending on education, supporting smaller farms, protecting small traders from hypermarkets and promoting Catholic social teaching in Polish law. The party also calls for a ban on the sale of Polish land to foreign entities, and closing loopholes that could allow foreign capital to buy land in Poland by proxy companies; the party argues that Polish land, forests and natural resources should be the state capital, as they are "a guarantee of Poland's economic independence and political sovereignty".

The party adheres to the philosophy of Catholic personalism; in its statement from 2019, the party wrote:

Natural law is a fundamental order, and therefore everything is built upon it. No system can function for long by rejecting natural law. Such a system simply rejects humanity. This is the character dimension of the Patrimony's personalism. It is based on respect for other people and making conscious decisions, on taking responsibility for the spiritual, intellectual and material heritage that begins in our families and extends to the entire nation. This dimension will provide security for our children, neighbours and future generations. It is the guarantee of our existence, freedom and subjectivity.

== Elections ==
The party ran in the following elections, always as a part of a political coalition:

- in 1991, it started with the Center Civic Alliance.
- in 1993, it started with the Coalition for the Republic.
- in 1997, it started with the Bloc for Poland. One of its leaders, Stanisław Majdański, gained a seat in the Senate for the Solidarity Electoral Action instead.
- in 2001, 2002, 2005 and 2007 it started with the League of Polish Families.
- in 2010, it started as part of the Right Wing Selfgovernment Alliance, and partook in the electoral committee of the presidential candidate Marek Jurek in the 2010 Polish presidential election.
- in 2011, it started with the "Right Wing".

=== Election results ===
==== Sejm ====
Election year	# of votes	% of vote	# of overall seats won	+/–
1989			8 / 460	▲8
1989	As the Christian-Agrarian Parliamentary Club.			
1991	977,344	8.71	2 / 460	▼6
1991	On behalf of the Centre Civic Alliance, which won 44 seats in total.			
1993	371,923	2.70	0 / 460	▼2
1993	On behalf of the Coalition for the Republic, which won no seats.			
1997	178,395	1.36	0 / 460	Steady
1997	On behalf of the National Christian Bloc for Poland, which won no seats.			
2001	1,025,148	7.87	2 / 460	▲2
2001	On behalf of the League of Polish Families, which won 38 seats in total.			
2005	940,762	7.97	1 / 460	▼1
2005	On behalf of the League of Polish Families, which won 34 seats in total.			
2007	209,171	1.30	0 / 460	▼1
2007	On behalf of the League of Polish Families, which won no seats.			
2011	35,169	0.24	0 / 460	Steady
2011	On behalf of the Right Wing of the Republic, which won no seats.			

==== Presidential ====
Election year	1st round			2nd round		
Election year	Candidate	# of overall votes	% of overall vote	Candidate	# of overall votes	% of overall vote
1995	Supported Jan Olszewski	1,225,453	6.86 (#4)			
2010	Supported Marek Jurek	177,315	1.06 (#8)			

==== Regional assemblies ====
Election year	# of votes	% of vote	# of overall seats won	+/–
2002	1,603,366	14.36	0 / 561	New
2002	On behalf of the League of Polish Families, which won 92 seats.			
2010	73,429	0.01	0 / 561	New
2010	On behalf of the Right Wing of the Republic, which won no seats.			
