= Centre Agreement – Polish Union =

Centre Agreement – Polish Union Porozumienie Centrum - Zjednoczenie Polskie (Polish)
- Founded: 19 June 1993
- Dissolved: 20 September 1993
- Ideology: Christian democracy Conservatism; Anti-communism
- Political position: Center-right
- Members: Centre Agreement; Third Republic Movement; Christian-Democratic Labour Faction; Party of Fidelity to the Republic; Regional Agreement RdR
- Colours: Red
- Slogan: Poland! Time for change. (Polish: Polsko! Czas na zmiany.)

The Centre Agreement – Polish Union (Polish: Porozumienie Centrum – Zjednoczenie Polskie, PC-ZP) was a Christian-democratic electoral alliance in Poland. It united the Centre Agreement (PC), Third Republic Movement (RTR), Christian-Democratic Labour Faction (ChDSP), Party of Fidelity to the Republic (SWR-KSN) (a Confederation of Independent Poland splinter) and Regional Agreement RdR.

== History ==
The PC-ZP coalition was founded on 19 June 1993 during failed negotiations with the Movement for the Republic (RdR), which later formed its own coalition, the Coalition for the Republic (KdR). The two coalitions competed for the same group of voters, and remained divided largely due to "personal issues", such as foreseen allocation of cabinet positions, candidate placement on electoral lists and personal rivalry between PC leader Jarosław Kaczyński and RdR leader Jan Olszewski. It also failed, like KdR, to unite the Polish People's Party – Peasants' Agreement (PSL-PL) under its flag.

The coalition ran a similar campaign to that of KdR, being in support of lustration and in opposition to the neocommunist party (Democratic Left Alliance, SLD) and liberal parties (Democratic Union, UD, Liberal Democratic Congress, KLD).

In the 1993 Polish parliamentary election, the only election the coalition contested in, it registered as a party, and thus only needed 5% of valid votes to pass the electoral threshold (as opposed to 8% needed for registered coalitions), which it failed to cross regardless, gathering only 4.42% of valid votes.

== Election results ==
=== Sejm ===
Election	Votes	%	Seats	Status
1993	609,973	4.42 (#9)	0 / 460	Extra-parliamentary

=== Senate ===
Election	Votes	%	Seats
1993	607,624	2.23 (#11)	1 / 460
