= Jerzy Czerwiński =

Polish politician (1960–2024)

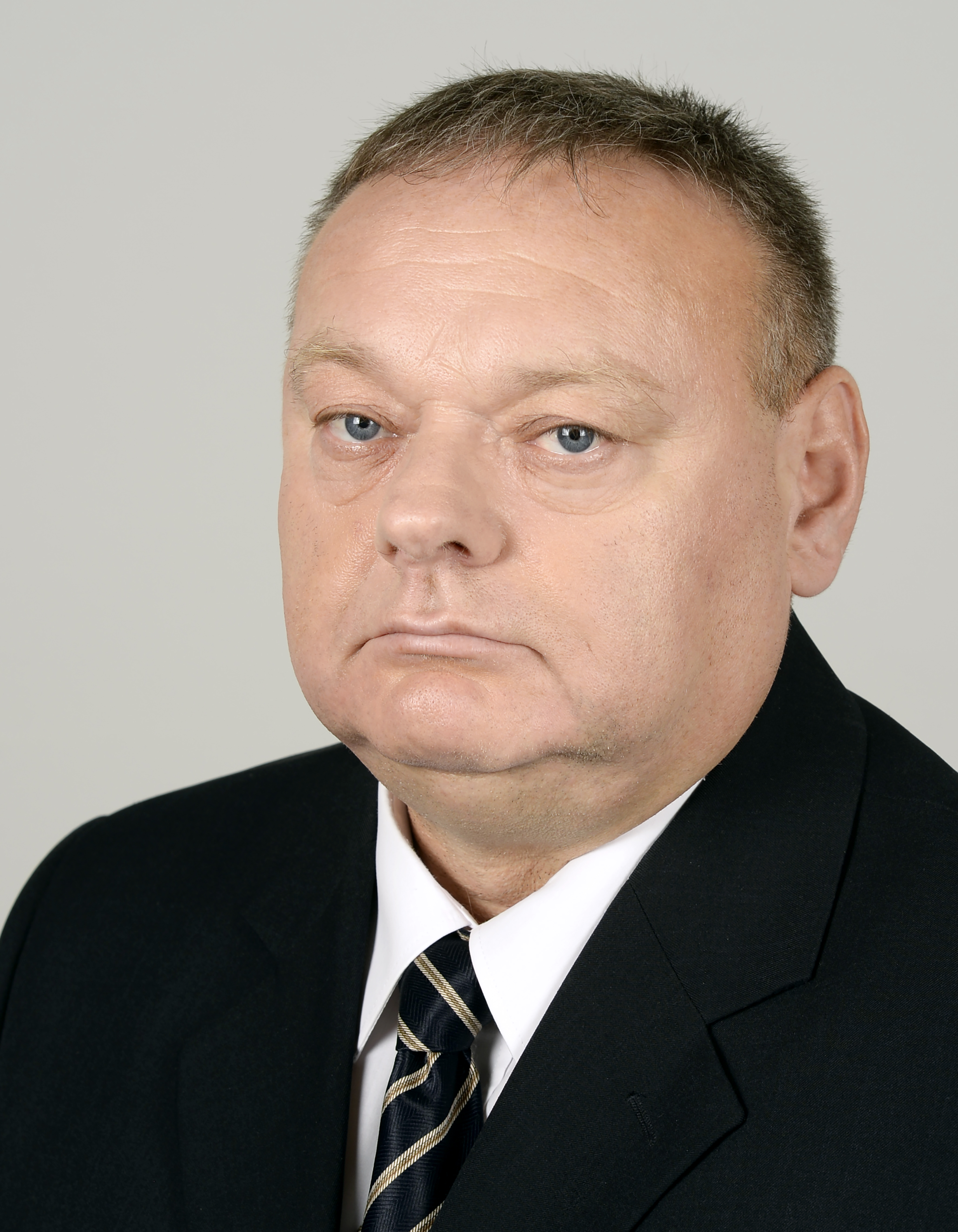
- Czerwiński in 2015

Member of the Senate of Poland

Personal details
- Born: 19 June 1960 Niemodlin, Poland
- Died: 12 August 2024 (aged 64) Prudnik, Poland
- Party: Law and Justice
- Other political affiliations: Ruch dla Rzeczypospolitej, Movement for Reconstruction of Poland, National-Catholic Movement

Jerzy Czerwiński (Polish pronunciation: [ˈjɛ.ʐɨ t͡ʂɛrˈvʲiɲ.skʲi]; 19 June 1960 – 12 August 2024) was a Polish politician. He was elected to the Senate of Poland (10th term) representing the constituency of Opole.

== Life and career ==
In 1984, he graduated from the Faculty of Mathematics and Physics at the Silesian University of Technology, in 1993 he completed postgraduate studies in computer science at the Pedagogical University of Opole, and in 2013 he completed postgraduate studies in teaching mathematics in schools at the Silesian University of Technology. From 1984 to 1985 he was a quality specialist at Zakłady Urządzeń Komputerowych MERA-ELZAB in Zabrze. From 1986 to 1987 he worked at the Provincial Hospital. From 1987 to 2013 he worked as a teacher in a high school in Biała. Beginning in 2013, he worked as a teacher in a secondary school (Centrum Kształcenia Zawodowego i Ustawicznego) in Prudnik.

In the years 1993–1995 he belonged to the Ruch dla Rzeczypospolitej, later he was active in the Movement for the Reconstruction of Poland; in 1995 he co-organized the presidential campaign of Jan Olszewski in Opole. In the years 1994–1998 he was a member of the town and gmina council of Prudnik, then, until 2001, of the council of the Prudnik County on behalf of Solidarity Electoral Action. In 1998 he won the "Belfer Roku" poll organized by Gazeta Wyborcza.

After leaving the Movement for Reconstruction of Poland in 1997, he joined the National-Catholic Movement founded by Antoni Macierewicz. In the 2001 Polish parliamentary election, starting from the list of the League of Polish Families in the Opole district, he obtained 5,718 votes and was elected a deputy of the 4th term. From 23 October 2001, he was the vice-chairman of the National and Ethnic Minorities Committee. In November 2002, he co-founded the National-Catholic Movement parliamentary group.

In 2005, he unsuccessfully ran for the Senate of the 6th term on behalf of his own committee. A year later, he was appointed councilor of the Opole regional council on behalf of the Law and Justice party. In the early parliamentary elections in 2007, he unsuccessfully ran from the Law and Justice list (he received 5,984 votes). In the same elections, he ran unsuccessfully for the office of the mayor of Prudnik. In the 2014 local elections, he did not get a seat in the regional council again (he was on the Law and Justice list and a candidate recommended by United Poland).

In 2015, he ran again to the Senate, this time on behalf of the Law and Justice party (as a member of the National-Catholic Movement) in district No. 51. He was elected senator of the 9th term, receiving 41,623 votes. During his term of office, he left the National-Catholic Movement and joined Law and Justice. From 2015, he was a member of Stowarzyszenie "Ziemia Prudnicka", which organizes patriotic, religious and national events in Prudnik.

In the 2019 parliamentary elections, he successfully ran for Senate re-election, receiving 73,426 votes.

Czerwiński died in Prudnik on 12 August 2024, at the age of 64.

== Political views ==
Czerwiński spoke negatively about gender, homosexual and transsexual people, Islam, abortion, euthanasia and the European Union.
