= Christian Democracy (Poland) =

Christian Democracy Chrześcijańska Demokracja
- Abbreviation: ChD
- Founded: 1991
- Dissolved: 1993
- Ideology: Christian democracy
- Religion: Catholicism
- Members: Christian-Democratic Labour Party; Christian Labour Party; Polish Christian Democratic Forum
- Colours: Purple; White

Christian Democracy (Polish: Chrześcijańska Demokracja, ChD) was a political alliance in Poland. It consisted of Catholic and Christian democratic parties.

== History ==
The alliance was formed to contest the 1991 elections, and consisted of five small Catholic parties, including the Christian Democratic Labour Party (ChDSP), the Christian Labour Party (ChPP) and the Polish Christian Democratic Forum (PFChD). In the elections it received 2.4% of the vote, winning five seats in the Sejm. It was represented by Józef Hermanowicz and Henryk Rospara from the ChPP, Stefan Pastuszewski from the ChDSP, Tadeusz Lasocki of the PFChD and Władysław Staniuk, an independent. The alliance supported the government of Jan Olszewski.

The three parties contested the 1993 elections separately.
