= Polish Union =

Polish Union Zjednoczenie Polskie
- Leader: Kazimierz Barczyk
- Founded: 1993
- Dissolved: 1998
- Split from: Movement for the Republic
- Merged into: Social Movement
- Ideology: Christian democracy Political Catholicism
- Political position: Centre-right
- National affiliation: Centre Agreement – Polish Union (1993); Social Movement (1997)
- Colors: Grey

The Polish Union (Polish: Zjednoczenie Polskie, ZP), also known as the Regional Agreement RdR (Polish: Porozumienie Regionalne RdR, PR-RdR) in 1993, was a Christian-democratic centre-right political party in Poland. The party was founded by defectors from Polish Christian-democratic party Movement for the Republic, who left the party over the dispute regarding forming a possible coalition with Centre Agreement, the party that Movement for the Republic was itself a split from. Shortly after being formed, the Polish Union announced an electoral union with the Centre Agreement in June 1993, known as Centre Agreement – Polish Union.

In the 1993 Polish parliamentary election, Centre Agreement - Polish Union won 609,973 votes which amounted to 4.42%, falling short of reaching the 5% electoral threshold needed in order to gain seats in the Sejm. However, the party did win a single seat in the Senate. After the defeat in the 1993 election, the party left Centre Agreement - Polish Union and re-registered itself as a separate party. The Polish Union then became one of the founding members of the Solidarity Electoral Action (AWS), and 7 of the party members gained seats in the 1997 Polish parliamentary election as part of the AWS. The party then dissolved in 1997 to join the Social Movement.

== History ==
The party has its origins in Centre Agreement, a moderate Christian-democratic party founded in May 1990, which participated in the 1991 Polish parliamentary election as part of the Centre Civic Alliance, a coalition supported by President Lech Wałęsa. After the election, new Sejm disbanded the short-lived cabinet of Jan Krzysztof Bielecki and formed the Cabinet of Jan Olszewski, led by Centre Agreement.

The cabinet of Olszewski as known as the "Agreement of Five", as it consisted of five centre to centre-right parties - Liberal Democratic Congress, Confederation of Independent Poland, Christian National Union, Peasants' Agreement and the Centre Agreement. However, internal infighting between the government members proved paralysing to Olszewski, and in 1992 President Wałęsa officially withdrew his support for Olszewski and his cabinet, prompting its downfall. Waldemar Pawlak became the new Prime Minister of Poland, coming from post-communist Polish People's Party.

Blaming the president as well as leader of Centre Agreement, Jarosław Kaczyński, for the downfall of his cabinet, Olszewski and party members loyal to him left the party to form Movement for the Republic (RdR) in 1992. As the party started preparing itself for the 1993 Polish parliamentary election, a faction of the party led by Andrzej Anusz proposed an electoral agreement with the Centre Agreement, considering it a pragmatic option that is necessary in order for the RdR to cross the electoral threshold and keep its seats in the Sejm.

However, Olszewski strongly opposed this proposal, and the subsequent conflict led Anusz and his faction to leave Movement for the Republic. Those who left founded Regional Agreement RdR, led by Anusz and Barczyk. Anusz and his new party then carried out their plan for an electoral agreement with Kaczyński, forming Centre Agreement – Polish Union. However, the party failed to cross the 5% electoral threshold as it earned 4.42% of the popular vote in the 1993 elections.

The agreement with Centre Agreement was then dissolved, and Polish Union was registered as a separate party under the leadership of Kazimierz Barczyk. The Polish Union continued its strategy of trying to cooperate with fellow centre-right parties, and in the 1995 Polish presidential election the party endorsed Hanna Gronkiewicz-Waltz for president.

In 1996, the party became on the founding members of the Solidarity Electoral Action. In the 1997 Polish parliamentary election, the party ran as a part of the Solidarity Electoral Action, with 7 of the party members gaining mandates in the Sejm. These were:

- Andrzej Anusz;
- Kazimierz Barczyk;
- Joanna Fabisiak;
- Marek Markiewicz;
- Bernard Szweda;
- Tomasz Wełnicki;
- Piotr Wójcik.

The party dissolved in 1998 to join the Social Movement.

== Electoral results ==
=== Presidential ===
Election year	Candidate	1st round		2nd round	
Election year	Candidate	# of overall votes	% of overall vote	# of overall votes	% of overall vote
1995	Supported Hanna Gronkiewicz-Waltz	492,628	2.76 (#7)	No second round	

=== Sejm ===
Election year	# of votes	% of vote	# of overall seats won	+/–
1993	609,973	4.4	0 / 460	New
1993	As part of the Centre Agreement – Polish Union coalition, which won no seats.			
1997	4,427,373	33.8	7 / 460	▲7
1997	As part of the Solidarity Electoral Action coalition, which won 201 seats.			

=== Senate ===
Election year	# of overall seats won	+/–
1993	1 / 100	New
As part of the Centre Agreement – Polish Union coalition, which won no seats.
1997	3 / 100	▲2
As part of the Solidarity Electoral Action coalition, which won 51 seats.

== Ideology ==
The Polish Union was a Christian-democratic and a centre-right party. It identified with Political Catholicism and argued that the Polish state should take a protective role towards the Catholic Church, protecting it from anti-clerical policies as well as unfair ideological attacks. It particularly condemned the "leftist-post-communist milieu" for its harsh anti-clerical rhetoric, although it made a reference to the existence of few left-wing groupings that were friendly towards the Church. Prominent member of the party, Andrzej Anusz, described the party as "Solidarity-based, pro-independence, Christian democratic, and popular-national".

In administrative matters, the party stated its strong preference for a parliamentary republic over a presidential republic, stating that the Prime Minister should have the power to manage all government ministries, with no presidential interference. The Polish Union also argued that economic crimes, especially those committed by public officials, should be considered the most serious crimes in the Polish criminal code. The party stated: "People who have committed crimes must be punished, their privileges must be stripped and all those who have acted to the detriment of the nation must be removed from state service. Without this, it is impossible to run a healthy state order and a healthy economy." The party also postulated increasing the competences of local governments, believing that local governments should have the power to pursue economic policies best suited for local conditions.

In its economic program, the Polish Union stated its support for social market economy that would be "based on the social teaching of the Church. According to the party, such combination would result in "economic efficiency while ensuring moral values". The party also argued that Polish economy should be based on small businesses, which should be given special state support in forms of lenient credits and subsidies. In contrast, large and foreign corporations were to be strictly regulated and appropriately taxed. It also wanted to maintain healthcare and education completely in the control of the state. The Polish Union also proposed anti-trust regulations that would root out 'unfair competition', and tariffs on agrarian products in order to protect Polish agriculture.
