= Coalition for the Republic =

Coalition for the Republic Koalicja dla Rzeczypospolitej (Polish)
- Founded: 6 July 1993
- Dissolved: 20 September 1993
- Ideology: Christian democracy Anti-communism; Anti-austerity; Factions: Agrarianism
- Political position: Center-right
- Members: Movement for the Republic; Solidarność '80; National Christian Movement Polish Action; Freedom Party; Upper Silesian Christian Democracy; Party of Polish Democracy; Polish Popular-Christian Forum "Patrimony"; Patriotic Forum of Fighting Poland
- Colors: Red
- Slogan: Coalition of clean hands. (Polish: Koalicja czystych rąk.)

The Coalition for the Republic (Polish: Koalicja dla Rzeczypospolitej, KdR) was a Christian-democratic electoral alliance in Poland. It consisted of several parties - the Movement for the Republic (RdR), Solidarność 80, National Christian Movement "Polish Action" (Akcja Polska), Freedom Party (PW), Upper Silesian Christian Democracy (GChD), Party of Polish Democracy (SDP), Polish Popular-Christian Forum "Patrimony" ("Ojcowizna") and the Patriotic Forum of Fighting Poland.

== History ==
The Coalition was initially formed on 6 July 1993, after a failure of two-month long coalition talks between RdR and the Centre Agreement (PC), the original party of RdR chairman Jan Olszewski. A failed attempt at bringing the Polish People's Party - Peasants' Agreement (PSL-PL) into the coalition left it as the weakest of the three "center-right" coalitions (other ones being the Catholic Electoral Committee "Fatherland" (KKW or "Ojczyzna") and Centre Agreement – Polish Union (PC-ZP)) running in the 1993 Polish parliamentary election.

KdR ran a campaign under the slogan "coalition of clean hands" (Polish: „Koalicja czystych rąk"). The campaign was notably similar to PC-ZP, both attacking the "neocommunist" Alliance of the Democratic Left (SLD) and "pseudoliberal" Democratic Union (UD) and Liberal Democratic Congress (KLD), the Balcerowicz plan as well as supporting lustration.

The coalition only contested one election, the 1993 parliamentary election, winning 2.70% of valid votes. Despite de-facto being a coalition, it registered as a party, thus only needing 5% of valid votes to cross the electoral threshold, which it failed to pass regardless. Their failure to pass the threshold contributed to the SLD's landslide victory in the election.

== Electoral results ==
=== Sejm ===
| Election year | # of votes | % of vote | # of overall seats won | Government |
|---|---|---|---|---|
| 1993 | 371,923 | 2.70 (#14) | 0 / 460 | Extra-parliamentary |

=== Senate ===
| Election | # of votes | % of votes | # of overall seats won |
|---|---|---|---|
| 1993 | 290,361 | 1.06 (#15) | 0 / 100 |
