= Stefan Pastuszewski =

Polish poet, journalist, and politician

Stefan Marian Pastuszewski

Member of Bydgoszcz City Council
- In office 26 October 2005 – ?

Personal details
- Born: 19 August 1949 (age 76) Bydgoszcz, Poland
- Party: Law and Justice

Stefan Marian Pastuszewski (born 19 August 1949 in Bydgoszcz, Poland) is a Polish poet, journalist and politician, former Member of Polish Sejm (1991–93), Vice-President of Bydgoszcz (1994-98), Member of Bydgoszcz City Council who represented the 1st district (since 2005).

Between 1991 and 1993 he was a Member of the Sejm for Christian Democracy. He was elected from 17 Bydgoszcz district as the Christian Democratic Labour Party candidate.

On 27 October 2002 he ran for Bydgoszcz City Council as a Law and Justice candidate in 1st district. He was placed second on the Law and Justice list and received 957 votes, failing to be elected.

In 2004 European Parliament election he was a candidate of the All-Poland Civic Coalition (OKO) from Kuyavian-Pomeranian constituency. He polled 789 votes and was not elected.

In the 25 September 2005 parliamentary election, he ran for Polish Senate as an independent candidate. He received 11,437 votes and took 12th place in 4 Bydgoszcz district. Two Law and Justice candidates, Kosma Złotowski and Radosław Sikorski, were elected. Złotowski resigned from his seat on Bydgoszcz City Council on 12 October 2005, and because Pastuszewski was second after Złotowski on the Law and Justice list in 2002, he took his seat in Bydgoszcz City Council on 26 October 2005.

On 12 November 2006 he was elected to Bydgoszcz City Council. He scored 1,428 votes in 1st district, representing the Law and Justice list. He took office on 27 November 2006. He is a Chairperson of Culture and Science Committee and a member of Municipal Economy and Environmental Protection Committee, Education Committee and Audit Committee.

On 21 October 2007 he ran for the Sejm. He received 2,755 votes in 4 Bydgoszcz district and failed to be elected.

== See also ==
- List of Sejm members (1991–1993)
- Bydgoszcz City Council
