= Social Movement =

Political party in Poland (1997–2004)

The Social Movement (Polish: Ruch Społeczny, RS) was a Christian-democratic political party in Poland.

== History ==
The party was established in December 1997 by non-party independents affiliated with the Solidarity Electoral Action (AWS) coalition. Most of them were recommended by the Solidarity trade union and/or were former members of the Solidarity Citizens' Committee. The two AWS leaders, Marian Krzaklewski and Jerzy Buzek, joined the party and were its first two chairmen. The RS became that largest faction within AWS, along with those associated with the Christian National Union, the Party of Christian Democrats, the Conservative People's Party and Centre Agreement.

In the 1997 parliamentary election the AWS won 33.8% of the vote and a plurality of its elected MPs were affiliated with RS. After the election, AWS' member Buzek formed a coalition government, which comprised also the liberal Freedom Union and included another RS leading member, Janusz Tomaszewski, among its deputy prime ministers.

In the 2000 presidential election Krzaklewski, as AWS' official candidate, won 15.6% of the vote, but a large chunk of the coalition, especially activists of the more liberal Conservative People's Party, had supported the independent candidate Andrzej Olechowski, who won 17.3% of the vote. Since then, several politicians started to leave the RS.

In the 2001 parliamentary election the AWS was formed mainly of four components: the Social Movement, the Christian National Union, the Party of Christian Democrats and the Confederation of Independent Poland. The coalition won 5.6% and no seats, as the electoral threshold was 8%.

The RS was finally dissolved in April 2004, opening the way for a new outfit, the Centre Party. At that time, however, most RS and AWS members had already joined Civic Platform (of which Olechowski was one of the three founding leaders) and Law and Justice (led by Jarosław Kaczyński and Lech Kaczyński), both formed in 2001.
