= Labour Party (Poland) =

Labour Party Stronnictwo Pracy
- Leader: Zbigniew Wrzesiński
- Founder: Władysław Siła-Nowicki
- Founded: 12 February 1989
- Registered: 1990
- Preceded by: Labour Faction
- Membership (1991): 3000
- Ideology: Christian democracy Political Catholicism

The Labour Party (Polish: Stronnictwo Pracy, SP) is a minor political party in Poland. It was formally called the Christian-Democratic Labour Party (Polish: Chrześcijańsko-Demokratyczne Stronnictwo Pracy, ChDSP) between 1989 and 2000. The party continued the traditions of the pre-war Labor Party, which ceased its activities in Poland in 1946. This made the party be considered a historical formation, together with the Polish Socialist Party.

== History ==
Logo used during one of chairman Siła-Nowicki's electoral campaigns

The party was established in February 1989 as an alternative to the Polish United Workers' Party–Solidarity political duopoly. It had its roots in the Christian Democratic Political Theory Club, which had been established the year before by members of the Association for the Promulgation of Catholic Social Science. It was initially known as the Christian Democratic Labour Party (Chrześcijańsko-Demokratyczne Stronnictwo Pracy, ChDSP), and claimed to be the successor to the Labor Faction that was dissolved after World War II. It was initially headed by Władysław Siła-Nowicki, and it was hoped that his prestige would help popularise the party. Two members were elected to Parliament on the Solidarity Citizens' Committee list in the 1989 parliamentary elections; Marek Rusakiewicz became a member of the Sejm and Walerian Piotrowski was elected to the Senate.

It was formally registered as a political party in September 1990, and emerged as one the first parties of the Christian-democratic (Polish: chadecja) tradition in post-communist Poland. As a legal political party, the ChDSP (in the 1980s it functioned as the opposition Labor Party), resumed its activities on February 12, 1989. At the Third Congress in 1990, the name Christian Democratic Labor Party was adopted. It was reactivated on the initiative of former activists from the pre-war party, associated with the Christian-Democratic Political Thought Club (Polish: Chrześcijańsko-Demokratyczny Klub Myśli Politycznej) established in 1988.

Initially, the prognosis for the party's success was successful. It gathered 3000 members amongst 100 of its national party clubs, and cooperated with academic Catholic circles. Although structures had to be built practically from scratch after 1989, the ChDSP boasted a long tradition, a steadily growing membership, and experienced activists such as Władyslaw Siła-Nowicki. Despite this, the support the party dissipated. Rival Christian Democratic formations were formed, such as Porozumienie Centrum and the Christian Democratic Party. In addition, people that were joining the party often had a communist background. This had a negative impact on the party's cohesion.

However, the party failed to gain significant support, and never attracted more than 2,000 members. It split over whether to support Siła-Nowicki or Solidarity leader Lech Wałęsa in the 1990 presidential elections, with the Wałęsa-supporting faction breaking away to form the Christian Democratic Party "Union". The remaining members of the ChDSP subsequently contested the 1991 parliamentary elections as part of the Christian Democracy alliance that won five seats. Stefan Pastuszewski was the party's sole MP.

Internal heterogeneity affected the party's start in elections. In 1989, the party wanted to run on the lists of the Solidarity Citizens' Committee, but their candidates were not accepted at the provincial and central levels. So they ran independently, and although they did not win any seats, they fared best among opposition parties that fielded candidates on their own. However, they fared more favorably in the 1990 local elections, when they won more than 200 seats.

The party joined the Centre Agreement for the 1993 parliamentary elections. However, the alliance failed to win any seats. In 1994, it merged with the small Christian Democracy party, and was renamed Christian Democracy-Labour Party (Chrześcijańska Demokracja-Stronnictwo Pracy, ChD-SP). It was part of the Solidarity Electoral Action alliance that won the 1997 elections; the ChD-SP held one of its 201 seats in the Sejm, taken by Witold Nieduszyński.

In 2000, the party became the Labour Party. It was part of the Law and Justice list for the 2001 elections, but failed to win a seat. It was part of the All-Poland Citizen Committee for the 2004 European Parliament elections, but it received 0.6% of the vote and failed to win a seat. Prior to the 2005 elections the party split, with some members leaving to form the All-Poland Civic Coalition and others founded Ancestral Home. The Labour Party contested the elections alone, but received just 1,019 votes and failed to win a seat. The other two parties both received more votes, but also failed to win a seat.

== Ideology ==
The Labour Party was Christian democratic. The party believed that the Catholic Church should play a major role in shaping Poland's post-communist identity. Economically, the party believed that the country should relinquish its communist-era monopolies, and state ownership of the means of production or central planning should be forbidden, with all state-owned properties either privatized or liquidated. Despite being a Christian-democratic party, the ChDSP supported the free market and unregulated competition.

The party declared its commitment to the Catholic social teaching and adhered to the "Catholic vision of man" and wished to empower Catholic morality in private and social life. In its party program, it declared commitment to the principles of solidarity, social justice, and democracy as the most optimal system.

Despite its ideological orientation, the party was lukewarm towards Solidarność, stating that while it respects its efforts, it is against the "compromise of Magdalenka" which the party saw as a failure to break with the communist past.
