= National-Catholic Movement =

National-Catholic Movement Ruch Katolicko-Narodowy
- Leader: Małgorzata Romanowicz
- Founder: Antoni Macierewicz
- Founded: 14 December 1997
- Dissolved: 6 February 2023
- Headquarters: ul. Hoża 62 lok. 1, 00-682, Warsaw
- Ideology: Polish nationalism National Catholicism
- Political position: Far-right
- National affiliation: Parliamentary club Law and Justice
- Colours: Red, White

The National-Catholic Movement (Polish: Ruch Katolicko-Narodowy) was a small Polish political party represented in the Senate of the Republic of Poland. The only current senator was elected from the Law and Justice electoral committee's ballot.

On February 6, 2023, the District Court in Warsaw decided to deregister the party due to the RKN's submission of the financial statements for 2019 after the deadline

== Leaders ==
- Małgorzata Romanowicz - chairman

== Senator ==
- Jerzy Czerwiński
