= Leszek Murzyn =

Polish politician (1960–2021)

member of Sejm 2005-2007
- In office 25 September 2005 – 2007

Personal details
- Born: 15 November 1960 Wiśniowa, Poland
- Died: 13 December 2021 Kraków, Poland
- Party: League of Polish Families

Leszek Murzyn (15 November 1960 – 13 December 2021) was a Polish politician.

== Career ==
He was elected to the Sejm on 25 September 2005, getting 7220 votes in 12 Chrzanów district as a candidate from the League of Polish Families list. He was also a member of Sejm 2001-2005.

== Death ==
Murzyn died on 13 December 2021, at the age of 61.

== See also ==
- Members of Polish Sejm 2005-2007
