= Party of Polish Democracy =

The Party of Polish Democracy (Polish: Stronnictwo Demokracji Polskiej, SDP) was a political party in Poland.

== History ==
The party was established in March 1991 as the Polish Christian Democratic Forum (Polskie Forum Chrześcijańsko-Demokratyczne, PFChD) as an initiative of the PAX Association and the Polish Catholic-Social Association. It contested 1991 parliamentary elections as part of the Christian Democracy alliance that won five seats. Tadeusz Lasocki was the party's sole MP.

In 1993 the party was renamed the Party of Polish Democracy. It joined the Coalition for the Republic for the parliamentary elections that year, but the alliance failed to win a seat. It was part of Solidarity Electoral Action in the 1997 elections. It held one of the alliance's 201 seats in the Sejm, with Waldemar Pawłowski being its only MP.

The party was dissolved in 1999, with most members joining the Christian National Union.
