= Movement for the Republic =

Movement for the Republic Ruch dla Rzeczypospolitej
- Abbreviation: RdR
- Founder: Jan Olszewski
- Founded: 1992
- Dissolved: 1999
- Split from: Centre Agreement; Christian National Union
- Succeeded by: Movement for the Reconstruction of Poland (Majority, including Olszewski); Regional Agreement RdR (Minority); Movement for the Republic – Patriotic Camp (Minority); Polish Christian Democratic Agreement (Minority)
- Ideology: Christian democracy Anti-neoliberalism; Protectionism; Distributism
- Political position: Centre-right
- Religion: Roman Catholicism
- National affiliation: Coalition for the Republic (1993)
- Colours: White; Red; Orange

The Movement for the Republic (Polish: Ruch dla Rzeczypospolitej, RdR) was a Christian-democratic political party in Poland. The party was founded by former members of centrist Centre Agreement who protested the downfall of Jan Olszewski and his cabinet from power. The party aspired to become the leading Christian-democratic party in Poland and contested the 1993 Polish parliamentary election, but it gained no seats as it failed to cross the 5% electoral threshold. The party was also mired by several splits and internal conflicts, which results in the party disintegrating into several smaller parties and formations. In 1995, Movement for Reconstruction of Poland founded by the party's first leader Jan Olszewski, absorbed most members of the party. The RdR dissolved in 1999.

Presenting itself as a party most dedicated to the tenets of Christian democracy on the Polish political scene, the Movement for the Republic stood out from other Polish centre-right parties by its highly hostile stance towards privatization and capitalist transition reforms, which it regarded as replacing one oligarchy with another. The party's economic program was based on the assumptions of distributism and envisioned an extensive renationalization program that would bring most industries in Poland back to state ownership, in addition to replacing the system of privatization with one based on employee shareholding, in which privatized companies would not be sold but distributed amongst its employees via shares.

== History ==
The RdR was formed in 1992 by a splinter group, led by former Prime Minister Jan Olszewski, from the Centre Agreement. Politicicans who left Centre Agreement in favor of the RdR did so to support Olszewski and protest the decision to dissolve his cabinet.

The new party included several prominent politicians of the Centre Agreement associated with Christian democracy, such as Andrzej Anusz, Przemysław Hniedziewicz, Kazimierz Barczyk, Wojciech Włodarczyk, Andrzej Kostarczyk and Olszewski himself.

The party was registered in December 1992, and started preparing itself to challenge its former party in the upcoming elections. However, the party suffered its first split even before the 1993 election, as a faction within the party led by Andrzej Anusz sought an electoral agreement with the Centre Agreement, which the leading wing of the party under the leadership of Olszewski rejected. As the result of this conflicty, the Anusz wing of the party left and founded his own party, Regional Agreement RdR, which then entered a union with Centre Agreement to form Centre Agreement - Polish Union (Polish: Porozumienie Centrum - Zjednoczenie Polskie).

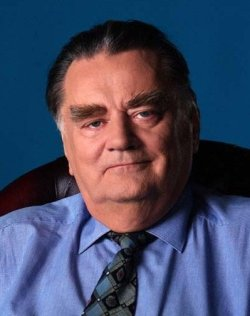
Jan Olszewski

In the 1993 parliamentary election the RdR, in coalition with minor parties, won 2.7% of the vote and failed to elect any MPs. In 1995 most members of the party joined Olszewski's Movement for Reconstruction of Poland.

The party strongly attacked the reforms that were made to the electoral system prior to the 1993 election, such as the implementation of the 5% electoral threshold and special privileges for large parties (defined as ones with at least 15 MPs in the Sejm). According to the RdR, the implemented changes resulted in a highly uncompetetive political system that strongly favors large, big-tent parties.

After losing the 1993 elections, a group of the party members led by Antoni Macierewicz left the Movement for the Republic, while in December of the same year another split occurred within the RdR. It was the result of the elections for party leader, won by Romuald Szeremietiew, the validity of which was challenged by supporters of Jan Olszewski. The main point of contention was Szeremietiew's support for Wałęsa, which the party's main faction led by Olszewski objected to.

As the result of his leadership position being challenged, Szeremietiew left the party to found his a rival Movement for the Republic with the exact same name, until its renaming in 1996 to the Movement for the Republic – Patriotic Camp (RdR–OP). RdR–OP later joined the Patriotic Camp - a political party with a "federative" structure.

After the 1995 Polish presidential election, a party called the Movement for the Reconstruction of Poland (Polish: Ruch Odbudowy Polski) began to form around Jan Olszewski's committees, to which a significant number of RdR activists moved.

In 1996–1997 the RdR briefly joined Solidarity Electoral Action.

In 1999 the RdR was merged with the Party of Christian Democrats into the Polish Christian Democratic Agreement.

== Ideology ==
The Movement for the Republic was a Christian-democratic split from the Centre Agreement, and represented very strong commitment to the values of Christian democracy in Poland, such as social conservatism and social market economy. It was considered a part of the centre-right family of Polish parties. In regards to its sociocultural outlook, the party declared: "Our attitude to Christian values stems from the obvious social fact, which is beyond dispute, that in Poland the system of Christian morality is the only one in force and that no rational and efficient legal system can be built without basing it on Christianity."

The party stood out by its distributist and anti-market stance on the economy - the party rejected privatization measures and the neoliberal Balcerowicz Plan that transitioned Poland to capitalist free-market economy. The RdR argued that the capitalist measures carried out in the early 1990s resulted in replacing the old oligarchic nomenklatura with a new one, with the only difference being its foreign outlook - pro-Western instead of pro-Russian. Instead of privatization, the party proposed renationalizing previously state-owned industries with paid compensation to its current owners. In cases where state ownership would not be desirable, the RdR offered to avoid selling businesses directly and instead distribute it amongst their current employees via system of employee shareholding.

Together with its anti-privatization stance, the party was also protectionist and strongly opposed to foreign capital in Poland. In its program, the party warned that an economic policy that did not prioritize 'national interest' and state ownership would result in Poland becoming a "tool in foreign hands". Instead of attracing foreign investment, the RdR wanted to put heavy limits on the participation of foreign capital in Polish economy and develop Polish industries by domestic measures only. The party warned that foreign countries and businesses do not invest in Poland out of good will, but rather expect something in return, namely extraction of Polish capital.

The RdR condemned fellow post-Solidarność groupings for their "idealization of the market and the mechanisms of the free market economy", and believed that the most optimal path for Poland would be to reverse free-market and privatization measures from the early 1990s in favor of restoring national ownership in a majority of industries. The party also argued that some industries should be completely exempt from market mechanisms, such as healthcare, education, energy, military and agriculture. The party envisioned strictly controlled farming industry where farmers would sell their goods to the state only, which would then be responsible to distribution of their products to the market and general population.

On foreign policy, the party advocated for the concept of balance, where Poland would remain neutral and have nearly-equal levels of trade and partnership with both the West and Russia. According to the politicians of the RdR, it was 'erroneous' of the Polish government to turn away from the east. The party was wary of the European Economic Community and the European Union, believing that Poland would open itself to German economic domination by joining the European bloc.

== Electoral results ==
=== Sejm ===
Election	# of votes	% of votes	# of overall seats won	Government
1993	371,923	2.70 (#14)	0 / 460	Extra-parliamentary
1993	As part of the KdR coalition.			

=== Senate ===
Election	# of votes	% of votes	# of overall seats won
1993	290,361	1.06 (#15)	0 / 460
1993	As part of the KdR coalition.		
