= Centre Agreement =

Centre Agreement Porozumienie Centrum
- Abbreviation: PC
- Leader: Jarosław Kaczyński
- Founded: 12 May 1990
- Dissolved: 25 September 2002
- Split from: Solidarity Citizens' Committee
- Succeeded by: Law and Justice
- Ideology: Christian democracy Moderate conservatism Economic nationalism Anti-communism
- Political position: Centre to centre-right
- National affiliation: Centre Civic Alliance (1991); Centre Agreement – Polish Union (1993); Solidarity Electoral Action (1996)
- European affiliation: European Democrat Union (1991–1996)
- International affiliation: International Democracy Union (1991–1996)
- Colors: Red

The Centre Agreement (Polish: Porozumienie Centrum, PC) was a Christian democratic political party in Poland. It was established in 1990 and had its roots in the Solidarity trade union and its political arm, the Solidarity Citizens' Committee. Its main leader was Jarosław Kaczyński. The party was initially the party of choice of Polish president Lech Wałęsa and heavily cooperated with him and his environment between 1990 and 1992, leading the first post-communist governments. In 1991, Jan Olszewski from Centre Agreement gained the support of Wałęsa for his candidacy for Prime Minister, forming a PC-led government. However, the government was mired in internal conflicts in 1992 and fell to a vote of no confidence. Afterwards, the party was increasingly marginalized and became a part of Solidarity Electoral Action in 1997. In 1999, the bigger faction of the party left for the newly created Polish Christian Democratic Agreement; further, in 2001, its leadership dissolved the party to found Law and Justice, the direct successor of the PC. The PC was then formally dissolved in 2002.

In its programme, the PC opposed socialism and was strongly anti-communist. It was a centrist party that declared its commitment to the principles of Christian democracy but distanced itself from Catholic nationalism. On cultural issues, the Centre Agreement adhered to Catholic principles, although it stressed that while it supports expanding the role of the Catholic Church in the Polish state, Poland must also accommodate non-believers. The party stood out through its economic program as it supported social market economy and was unique in the post-Solidarity front in its negative approach towards the neoliberal Balcerowicz Plan. The PC argued that market economy created 'distortions' which citizens should be protected from, and stated that the main goal of the Polish economy should be "preventing the impoverishment of families in need". The party was critical of privatization, seeing it as a reform that made a few people rich at the expense of the general population. Through this, the Centre Agreement represented voters who were anti-communist but nevertheless critical of liberal capitalism.

== History ==
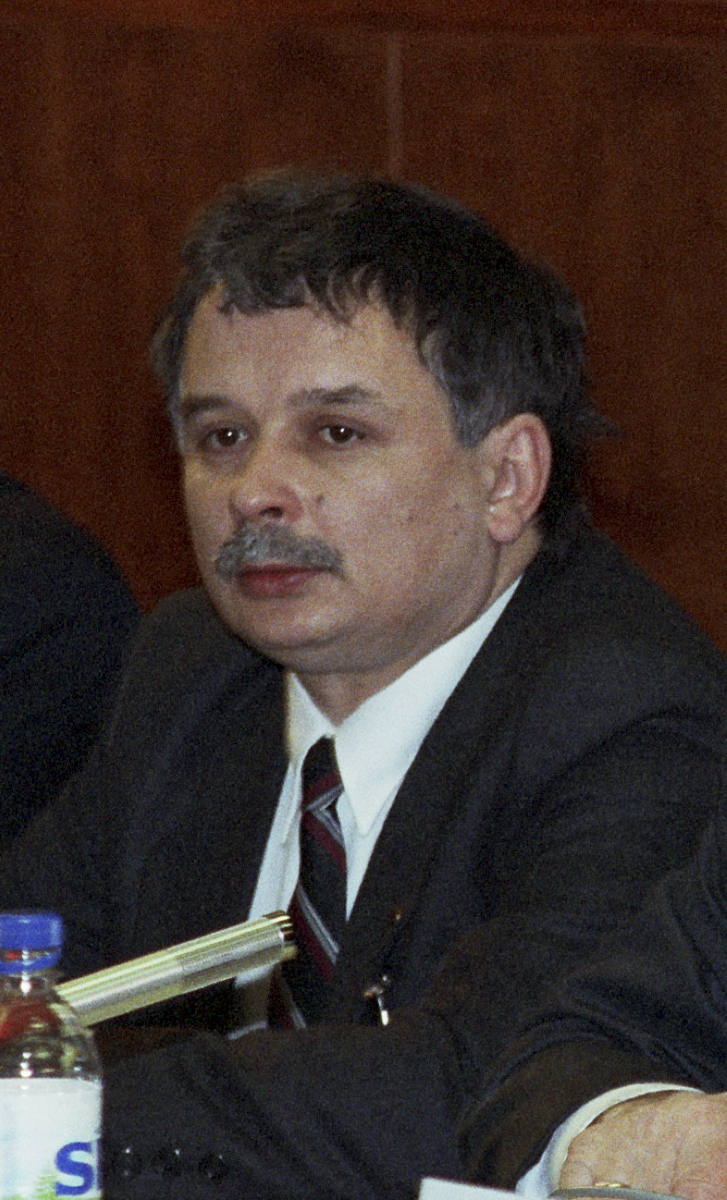
Lech Kaczyński, party leader, in 1991

In the 1991 parliamentary election, the PC was part of the Centre Civic Alliance, which obtained 8.7% of the vote. Subsequently, it joined the government led by Jan Krzysztof Bielecki of the Liberal Democratic Congress and, in December 1991, PC's Jan Olszewski formed a government that lasted until 1992. In the 1993 parliamentary election, the PC was reduced to 4.4% and failed to elect any MPs. The party was subsequently abandoned by many activists, who founded parties such as the Centre Agreement – Integrative Initiative, Movement for the Republic, Movement for Reconstruction of Poland and Polish Union.

During the first period of its existence, the Centre Agreement was not a homogeneous formation. It comprised, among others, the free-market "Gdańsk Liberals", several minor groupings with a Christian Democratic profile (the Christian Democratic Labour Party, the Young Christian Democrats), or the peasants from the Polish People's Party (Mikołajczykowskie). These ideologically diverse entities were united by their critical assessment of the policies of Tadeusz Mazowiecki's government, hence Lech Wałęsa became their natural ally, who in turn also gave his support to the newly established party on 11 June 1990. This alliance was accompanied by slogans on the dynamisation of the systemic changes, with demands for the fastest possible free elections, both parliamentary and presidential, as well as the reconstruction of the economy, by which they meant privatisation and demonopolisation.

The creation of the Agreement of the Centre coincided with the beginning of the so-called "war on the top" amongst Wałęsa and the rest of the post-Solidarity cabinet. The day after the conference at which the establishment of the party was announced, Lech Wałęsa expressed his approval for the existence of differentiation in the milieu of the former opposition. After the parliamentary elections of 27 October 1991, party-presidential disputes over the candidate for the post of Prime Minister began, which lasted for almost two months. Shortly after the parliamentary elections, Lech Wałęsa proposed four options for forming a new government.

In three of them, the President was also to serve as Chairman of the Council of Ministers. Taking this possibility into account, Wałęsa proposed the portfolio of Deputy Prime Minister to Jacek Kuroń. Among the party establishment of the Democratic Union, this idea did not gain support. Other parties reacted similarly to Wałęsa's proposal to combine the office of president and prime minister. Consequently, at the end of October 1991, Wałęsa encouraged Prime Minister Bielecki not to resign and to continue with his government. The President did not rule out the possibility of reconstructing the Cabinet and continuing it despite the change in the balance of power in parliament.

As a result of the Centee Agreement's opposition to this proposal, on 8 November 1991, Wałęsa entrusted the mission of forming a government to Bronisław Geremek. Resistance from right-wing parties forced Geremek on 13 November to abandon further talks. At that time, four parties were consulting on the Prime Minister's candidacy: KLD, KPN, PC and ZChN. On 13 November 1991, they were joined by the post-Solidarity People's Alliance (PL), forming the so-called 'Five'. Its candidate for the office of Prime Minister was attorney Jan Olszewski of the PC. For the next two weeks, the president took steps to disempower him and keep Bielecki's government submissive.

Finally, on 5 December 1991, Wałęsa presented to the Sejm the candidacy of Jan Olszewski. A day later, the Sejm dismissed the government of Jan Krzysztof Bielecki and accepted the candidate of the "five". However, Olszewski's government was mired with infighting and internal splits and conflicts. In addition to the programme issues, the negotiating difficulties were also created by differences of opinion about the legitimacy of the agreement itself, both in the coalition (the opposition of the Anusz group in the Centre Agreement, the reluctance of ZChN towards KLD and the cautious attitude towards the Democratic Union) and in the opposition (some UD and KLD activists were against the talks).

In addition, Mazowiecki wanted a new government to be formed, rather than the Unionists being co-opted into the existing one; he also took into account the possibility of breaking off the talks if they threatened to split the party; he was also opposed to forming a new cabinet without the Liberal Democratic Congress. During the deliberations of the Democratic Union Political Council, on 15 March 1992, members of the Right Fraction were strongly in favour of talks with Prime Minister Olszewski, Jan Rokita, Andrzej Celiński and Zofia Kuratowska were among the opponents. In the end, however, the chairman of the UD was authorised to enter into negotiation.

A period of meetings and consultations, lasting more than a month, began between representatives of the coalition and opposition parties originating from the August movement. Politicians were driven to conclude a grand coalition by declining public support for reform, but the insurmountable difficulty seemed to be the issue of parity in the distribution of ministerial portfolios. The agreement was hampered, for programmatic reasons, by peasant groupings for whom the liberal strands of the economic programme of the Democratic Union and KLD were unacceptable.

On 21 April 1992, despite the announced joint consultations, only the government parties met with the Prime Minister. Representatives of the 'small coalition' (Democratic Union, Liberal-Democratic Congress and Polish Economic Programme) were informed of the cancellation of the joint deliberations. The following day, however, when a meeting took place between the Prime Minister and representatives of the 'small coalition', the negotiations were broken off. It turned out that the barrier to the establishment of the 'grand coalition' was the disputes over the division of ministerial portfolios in the new government. Agreement on the expansion of the coalition was not reached.

As Olszewski was unable to form a stable government, President Wałęsa started distancing himself from him, causing a decline of political legitimacy and influence of the Olszewski cabinet. On 24 May 1992, the Democratic Union Political Council decided to table, together with the KLD and the PPG, a vote of no confidence in the Olszewski cabinet. Two days later, the President sent a letter to the Speaker of the Sejm withdrawing support for Jan Olszewski. On the night of 27-28 May 1992, the "small coalition" (UD, KLD and PPG) agreed that a vote of no confidence in the government would be tabled at the next sitting of the Sejm on 4–6 June. On 2 June, the President proposed the mission of forming the government to the leader of the PSL, thirty-two-year-old Waldemar Pawlak.

On 4 June, in the morning, Minister Macierewicz handed over to the most important organs of state, as well as to the presidents of parliamentary clubs, lists of persons listed in the archives of the Ministry of the Interior as secret collaborators. The President considered that the actions taken by Macierewicz could jeopardise the internal security of the state and, as a matter of urgency, submitted a motion to the Sejm for the dismissal of the Prime Minister. During an evening meeting between Wałęsa and the presidents of the main parliamentary clubs (apart from the PC and the Democratic Left Alliance), it was agreed that Waldemar Pawlak would become the new Prime Minister. After attempts to block the vote and the Prime Minister's dramatic evening speech on both television channels, the Sejm dismissed Jan Olszewski's cabinet on 5 June 1992. At the same time, the motion of the 'small coalition' and the president was voted on.

After the collapse of Jan Olszewski's government, there was a gradual marginalisation of the Centre Agreement. The grouping did not become a member of Hanna Suchocka's government formed in July 1992, which resulted in the PC's representation in the Sejm being reduced, as Jarosław Kaczyński decided to remove a group of MPs advocating the party's entry into the ruling coalition from the club. At the end of January 1993, there was a procession of supporters of both the PC and nationalist parties, cited repeatedly in the media in later years, whose bond was support for Jan Olszewski's cabinet. A dummy of Lech Wałęsa bearing the inscription "Bolek" was burnt at Belvedere, the then seat of the President. Even former Prime Minister Olszewski distanced himself from these radical street actions, stating that situations in which the most important problems of public life are settled on the street should be avoided.

In 1996, the PC joined the Solidarity Electoral Action coalition, which won the 1997 parliamentary election with 33.8% of the vote. However, shortly before the election PC leader Jarosław Kaczyński left the coalition and in the election he was elected from the slate of the Movement for Reconstruction of Poland. In 1998 PC MPs joined forces with the Party of Christian Democrats, within the parliamentary group of Solidarity Electoral Action. However, in 2001, Jarosław Kaczyński and Lech Kaczyński launched Law and Justice, which would become the country's largest party.

== Ideology ==
The Centre Agreement advocated radical decommunization and accelerated reforms. In 1991, the PC split, as several constituent parties left the party, such as the Liberal Democratic Congress (KLD), the "Mikołajczykowskie" PSL, the "Solidarity" PSL and others. The Citizens' Movement for Democratic Action (ROAD), on the other hand, was the response of centrist circles to the establishment of the PC. The Forum of Democratic Right (FPD) emphasised the importance of conservative ideology.

The party was not considered a conservative party, and did not identify with conservatism. Polish political scientist lists Centre Agreement amongst post-Solidarność parties that were not conservative, writing: "However, it would be difficult to classify these groupings as conservative parties, due to the fact that they did not strictly identify themselves with conservatism in their names (Porozumienie Centrum, Zjednoczenie Chrześcijańsko-Narodowe), and in their programme documents they mainly exposed Catholic-national concepts (Zjednoczenie Chrześcijańsko-Narodowe) or Christian-democratic concepts (Porozumienie Centrum), rather than conservative ones."

In the cultural sphere, the Centre Agreement sought to maintain a distance from both the Democratic Union, in which strong influences from the Solidarity left were perceived, and the Christian National Union, seen as anachronistic. This is evidenced by the words spoken by the leader of the PC, Jarosław Kaczyński, in an interview given in 1993 to Michał Bichniewicz and Piotr M. Rudnicki: "I am not in favour of what the conservatives from ZChN are proposing, i.e. a return to the traditional-patriarchal family (...) This is not a model possible to propose to contemporary society". Regarding ZChN and Catholic nationalism represented by this party, Kaczyński remarked: "The Catholicism proposed by ZChN manifests itself in a specific form, as a demand for a Catholic state. I do not accept this type of political Catholicism (...) I once said of ZChN that it is the shortest road to the de-Christianisation of Poland. I fully uphold this opinion (...)'."

In his public statements, Kaczyński also stated that the Centre Agreement is a Christian-democratic party but is not a confessional one. He argued that the Centre Agreement is not an inherently nationalist or a Catholic party. He stated: "ZChN is a grouping that refers to the tradition of organised Polish nationalism. We firmly reject this tradition. Secondly, it is a grouping of fundamentalist Catholic, which we also reject. We are a Christian grouping, but we are open, you can be a member of the PC and a non-believer. We are not a parish party and they [ZChN] have recently convened parish committees that will form a party."

In a 1993 report by the Centre for Public Opinion Research, authored by Piotr Starzyński, the electorate of the Centre Agreement was depicted as characterised by infrequent participation in religious practices and expressing trust in political parties as such, as well as a belief that politicians take an interest in the affairs of citizens not only during elections. On the other hand, however, it was an electorate rather dissatisfied with the economic situation prevailing at the time, ambivalent towards the market economy as well as opposed to supporting the development of private companies. The author of the report argued that the Centre Agreement was becoming a populist party, bringing together people who were dissatisfied and averse to private property, especially when its beneficiaries were only a small part of society.

A liberal-leaning weekly magazine Polityka was cautiously positive towards the Centre Agreement, writing that the activists of the party "have not gone down as extremists, nationalists (...) and presented a much more rationalist programme than the noisy groups of the Polish right"; the magazine characterized the profile of the party as "centre with a slight tilt to the right". This relatively positive media image of Porozumienie Centrum began to change when the party started to become a co-ruling grouping, forming Jan Olszewski's government, while after the attempted vetting in June 1992, the party's image in media other than those associated with the right wing became unequivocally negative.

The changing image of the party was caused by its very strong focus on decommunization and its slogan of "acceleration", with the goal of completely dismantling the legacy of Communist Poland and persecute people associated with the Communist regime, including civic and political exclusion. The party focused less on issues of the day such as the cultural issues, morality, the role of the Church in the state and even topics related to the social market economy (that the party as a Christian-democratic supporting); instead, the Centre Agreement was focused on the issues of decommunization and relates reforms, presenting a strongly anti-communist program that warded off voters ambivalent or moderate in their approach to the communist legacy of Poland.

In its concept of political Catholicism, the PC balanced the need to follow the principles of Catholicism with modernisation. In its program, the party declared: "The Polish national interest requires a major work of national economic, organisational, and social modernisation. This modernisation should respect the moral values defended by Christianity constituting our identity. Without this change of system we will never bridge the civilisational gap between Europe and us. (…) The bases of every change in Poland must be the restoration of our moral system. (…) The role of the Catholic Church is of immense importance to the build up of our moral system, bitterly attacked by the left-wing post-communist environment."

The Centre Agreement stood out by its criticism of economic liberalism and willingness to question free-market reforms, something that was strongly avoided by other post-Solidarity parties as to deflect criticisms of post-communist groupings. The party spoke of the economy in terms of familialism and an extensive welfare state, stating that the main objective of the economy should be "preventing the impoverishment of families in need", and proposing an agricultural reform that would promote family farming at expense of agricultural corporations and large farms. Centre Agreement advocated for a balanced approach to reforms, speaking against the calls to make the Polish economy competitive and integrate it into Western markets. The party employed economically nationalist rhetoric, warning that unselective, hasty privatization and deregulatory reforms will threaten Polish sovereignty, "first economically, and then politically".

== Electoral results ==
=== Presidential ===
Election	Candidate	1st round		2nd round	
Election	Candidate	# of overall votes	% of overall vote	# of overall votes	% of overall vote
1990	Supported Lech Wałęsa	6,569,889	40.0 (#1)	10,622,696	74.3 (#1)
1995	Supported Jan Olszewski	1,225,453	6.9 (#4)	Supported Lech Wałęsa	
2000	Supported Marian Krzaklewski	2,739,621	15.5 (#3)		

=== Sejm ===
Election	# of votes	% of vote	# of overall seats won	+/–	Government
1991	977,344	8.71 (#4)	44 / 460	▲44	PC–ZChN–PSL-PL–SLCh (1991–1992)
1991	977,344	8.71 (#4)	44 / 460	▲44	UD–ZChN–PChD–KLD–PSL-PL–SLCh–PPPP (1992–1993)
1991	As part of the Centre Civic Alliance coalition.				
1993	609,973	4.42 (#9)	0 / 460	▼44	Extra-parliamentary
1993	As part of the Centre Agreement – Polish Union coalition, which won no seats.				
1997	4,427,373	33.83 (#1)	14 / 460	▲14	AWS-UW (1997–2000)
1997	4,427,373	33.83 (#1)	14 / 460	▲14	AWS minority (2000–2001)
1997	As part of the Solidarity Electoral Action coalition, which won 201 seats.				

=== Senate ===
Election	# of overall seats won	+/–
1991	9 / 100	New
1993	1 / 100	▼8
1997	3 / 100	▲2
1997	As part of the Solidarity Electoral Action coalition, which won 51 seats.	
