= Jan Olszewski =

42nd Prime Minister of Poland from 1991 to 1992

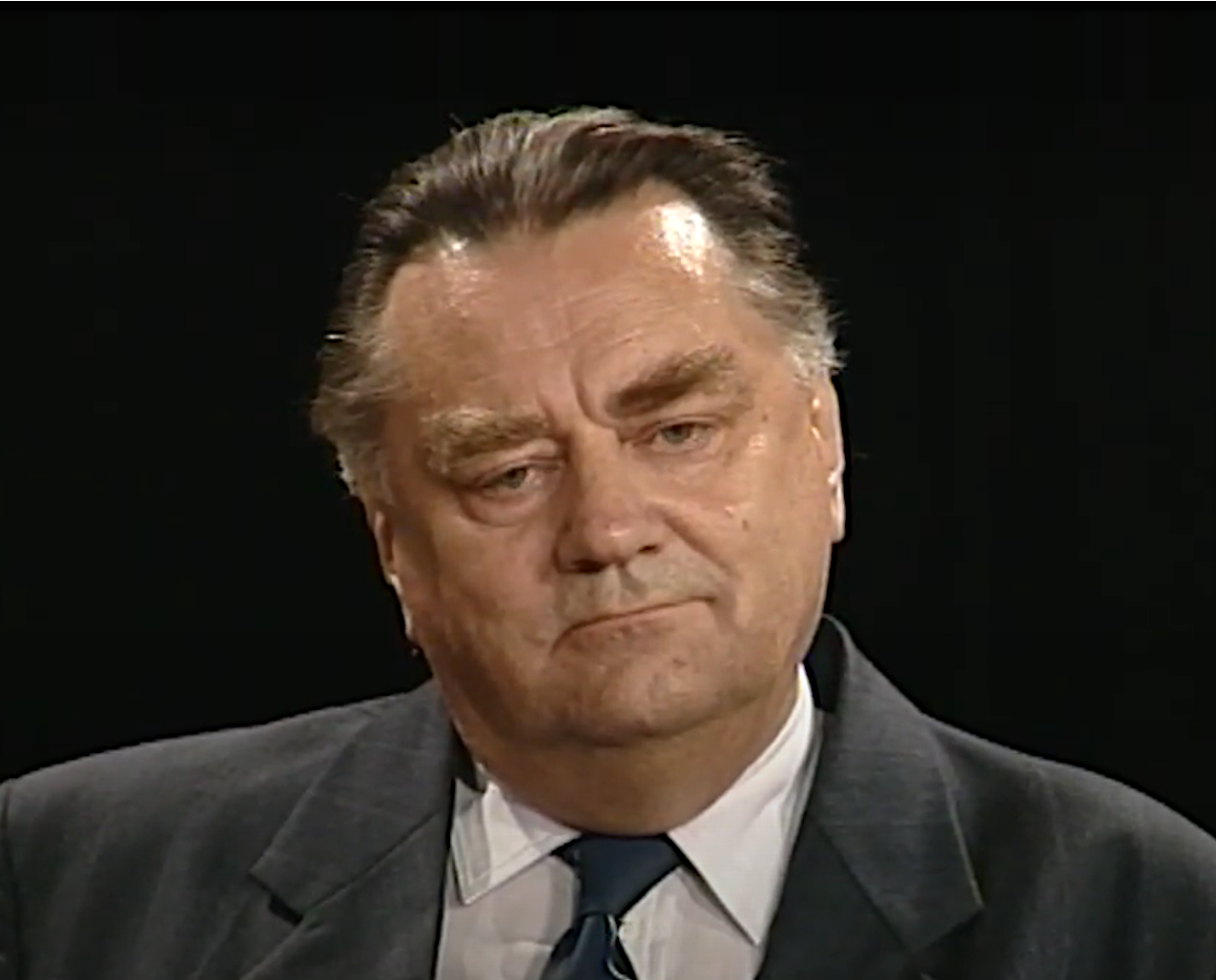
- Olszewski in 1993

Prime Minister of Poland
- In office 6 December 1991 – 5 June 1992
- President: Lech Wałęsa
- Preceded by: Jan Krzysztof Bielecki
- Succeeded by: Waldemar Pawlak

Member of the Sejm
- In office 18 June 1991 – 31 March 1993
- Constituency: Warsaw I
- In office 20 October 1997 – 18 October 2005
- Constituency: Warsaw I

Personal details
- Born: Jan Ferdynand Olszewski; 20 August 1930 Warsaw, Poland
- Died: 7 February 2019 (aged 88) Warsaw, Poland
- Resting place: Powązki Military Cemetery
- Party: Solidarity Citizens' Committee (1988–1990); Centre Agreement (1990–1992); Movement for the Republic (1992–1995); Movement for the Reconstruction of Poland (1995–2012)
- Spouse: Marta Miklaszewska
- Education: University of Warsaw
- Known for: prosecution of the murderers of Father Jerzy Popiełuszko during the Toruń trial
- Awards: Order of the White Eagle; Cross of Freedom and Solidarity
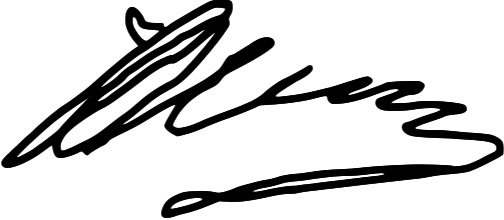
- Signature

Jan Ferdynand Olszewski (Note: Polish pronunciation: [ˈjan ɔlˈʂɛfskʲi]) (20 August 1930 – 7 February 2019) was a Polish conservative lawyer and politician who served as the Prime Minister of Poland for five months between December 1991 and early June 1992 and later became a leading figure of the conservative Movement for the Reconstruction of Poland.

During his premiership, Olszewski's cabinet worked under new international conditions. At the end of December 1991, the Soviet Union was dissolved. This motivated the government to start integration with NATO and European Community. For the first time, in official documents, it was mentioned that membership in NATO is part of Polish defence strategy. Negotiations to withdraw Russian armies from Poland started at the end of October 1990, were accelerated. In March 1992, a period of confusion occurred when president Lech Wałęsa presented his conception of new economic and military alliance with former Warsaw Pact during his visit to Germany, which went against the euro Atlantic direction of the government. Olszewski’s government changed the concept of privatization of national corporations. Total stop of privatization led to open conflict with liberal groups in the parliament. On 22 May 1992, Olszewski opposed the signing of a clause in Polish-Russian Treaty of Friendly and Neighbourly Cooperation, which handed over former Russian military bases to international Polish-Russian corporations. Olszewski sent a telegram to Moscow to the president Lech Wałęsa informing of government opposition to the clause. Wałęsa, after a conversation with Boris Yeltsin changed the controversial clause. However, this did not stop further clashes with the president.

Olszewski's cabinet did not hold a permanent parliamentary majority. Attempts to extend the coalition, first to Democratic Union, Liberal Democratic Congress and Polish Economic Programme, and then to Confederation of Independent Poland, were unsuccessful. On 24 May 1992, the council of the Democratic Union wrote a report calling the government to resign. On 26 May, Wałęsa sent a formal note to the Marshal of the Sejm, informing of withdrawal of support for the government. On 27 May, the four parties prepared for the vote of no confidence against the government. The following day, the Sejm passed a resolution obligating the Minister of Interior (at the time Antoni Macierewicz), to publish the list of communist secret police collaborators. On 29 May, representative of the Democratic Union, Jan Rokita, presented a vote of no confidence request on the behalf of 65 members of the parliament of the three parties. On 2 June, the final day of coalition negotiations with the Confederation of Independent Poland, Macierewicz met with deputy Marshal of that party, informing him that its leader, Leszek Moczulski, was on the list of collaborators which will be presented to the Sejm the following day.

The cabinet was recalled by the Sejm in voting after the midnight of 5 June 1992, few hours after publishing the list. Olszewski supported the decision of Macierewicz, proposing to establish an independent commission to verify the validity of the published documents. The Sejm did not debate this proposal. Wałęsa pressured on the Sejm to speed up the vote of no confidence, sending his own request. On 5 June 1992, 00:00 AM, after a vote of no confidence was approved, with 273 in favour and 119 against, Olszewski was forced to resign as prime minister and his cabinet was immediately replaced in an event known as the nightshift ("Nocna zmiana"). After Olszewski's dismissal, Wałęsa designated Waldemar Pawlak as the new prime minister. Olszewski's premiership was the second shortest in the history of the Third Republic.

== Early life and World War II ==
Born in Warsaw on 20 August 1930, Olszewski originated from a working-class family employed in the railway industry who were strongly connected to the Polish Socialist Party. Olszewski was related to Stefan Aleksander Okrzeja, a Polish socialist nationalist from the turn of the 20th century who was executed by Russian authorities in 1905 for leading insurgent activities. Despite Olszewski's active preference to right-wing politics later in life, he considered himself sympathetic to socialist causes during his early formative years.

During World War II, Olszewski was active in the Szare Szeregi (Grey Ranks), an underground part of the Polish Scouting Association. According to biographical information published at footnote five, Olszewski participated in the Warsaw Uprising in 1944.

== Political career: 1954–1992 ==
=== Communist era: 1954–1989 ===
In the immediate post-war years, Olszewski graduated from secondary school in 1949, later going on to study law at the University of Warsaw, where he graduated in 1953. Afterwards, he became an employee of the Ministry of Justice and later worked at the Polish Academy of Sciences. In 1956, Olszewski joined the writing staff of the weekly Po prostu (Plain Speaking) magazine. As a journalist during the relatively open Polish October, Olszewski came into contact with PZPR First Secretary and de facto head of state Władysław Gomułka, whom he spent many hours interviewing and described having a trustful relationship with after many frank discussions regarding the state of affairs of Poland and the Eastern Bloc. In an article titled "Na spotkanie ludziom z AK" ("Reaching out to the Men of the Home Army") published in March 1956, Olszewski, along with journalists Jerzy Ambroziewicz and Walery Namiotkiewicz, called for the rehabilitation of former Armia Krajowa soldiers who faced persecution from communist authorities for anti-state activities.

One of the first openly published articles of its kind to break the official silence on the Armia Krajowa, Olszewski argued that its veterans deserved a positive historical assessment in the struggle against Nazi Germany, describing all subsequent prosecutions of its ranks as being politically motivated. Despite the government's initial toleration of Po prostu's critiques, authorities moved in to forcibly close down the publication's offices in October 1956, citing it of presenting a false view of political and economic realities, spreading "disbeliefs" about socialism and proclaiming "bourgeois concepts". For his part, Olszewski faced a publication ban beginning in 1957. The forcible closure and censoring of Po prostu led Olszewski to become quickly disillusioned with the communist order. As a response, from 1956 to 1962, Olszewski was a member of the Crooked Circle Club, a Warsaw-based underground discussion group composed of intellectuals critical of the regime. During the 1960s, Olszewski became a leading defence attorney in political trials. Among others, he defended writer and journalist Melchior Wańkowicz, activist Jacek Kuroń, historian Karol Modzelewski and poet Janusz Szpotański. His professional activity was banned again in 1968 after the March student protests.

However, Olszewski returned to practice law in 1970 as Edward Gierek assumed power. Grateful for Olszewski's legal defence at his trial, the writer Melchior Wańkowicz kept a close relationship with Olszewski for the rest of his life, bequeathing funds to the lawyer and fellow dissident Jan Józef Lipski to help future defendants of political crimes shortly before his death in 1974. Olszewski later became a signatory of the Letter of 59 in 1975, an open protest to changes to the republic's communist constitution. In 1984, Olszewski served as an auxiliary prosecutor representing the family of murdered pro-Solidarity priest Jerzy Popiełuszko, whose statements during the trial of laying blame for the priest's murder on outside influences created international headlines. Joining the Solidarity movement in the early 1980s, Olszewski quickly rose to become a major figure in the opposition movement, playing a key role in drafting its founding charter. He would go on to become one of Solidarity's most active lawyers and legal experts. Olszewski, along with Solidarity leader Lech Wałęsa and other anti-government dissidents, participated in the Round Table Talks in early 1989 with the ruling PZPR, where he served as the opposition's legal expert. The talks successfully paved the way towards the partially free 1989 parliamentary elections.

=== Post-Communist era: 1989–1991 ===
With the fall of the communist regime in 1989, Olszewski was appointed as a member of the State Tribunal that year, a position he would hold until 1991. In 1990, Olszewski joined the conservative Centre Agreement, whose party membership composed primarily of Wałęsa supporters in that year's presidential election. Following the resignation of Prime Minister Tadeusz Mazowiecki in November 1990 after his first-round defeat in the presidential election, newly elected president Wałęsa sought a new prime minister. Initially, the president turned to Olszewski to take the position, though Olszewski quickly refused the post after numerous disagreements with Wałęsa over conditions the president placed on the prime minister's cabinet. Instead, Wałęsa turned to Jan Krzysztof Bielecki of the Liberal Democratic Congress to form a government. Bielecki's government lasted for the rest of 1991, collapsing in the aftermath of the inconclusive 1991 parliamentary elections.

While Wałęsa appointed Bronisław Geremek as prime minister, an accord was signed by five centrist and rightist parties in the Sejm, including the Liberal Democratic Congress, the Christian National Union, the Peasants' Agreement, the Confederation of Independent Poland and the Center Civic Alliance list (whose Olszewski's Centre Agreement belonged to) to select the next premier. The parties supported Olszewski, a parliamentary outsider and respected lawyer from the Solidarity movement, to unite the various clubs. Grudgingly, Wałęsa, who no longer had a stable working relationship with Olszewski, honoured the coalition agreement and appointed the lawyer as premier on 6 December. Three weeks of selecting the cabinet followed. In the meantime, the original accord behind Olszewski's appointment immediately began to fall apart, as both the Liberal Democratic Congress and the Confederation of Independent Poland withdrew their support from Olszewski over economic and cabinet disagreements. Similarly, the Democratic Union refused to support an administration not committed to rapid economic reform, a concern shared with the Liberal Democrats. Despite the weakened alliance, Olszewski's minority government was accepted by parliament on 23 December 1991.

== Prime Minister: 1991–1992 ==
=== Foreign and domestic policy ===
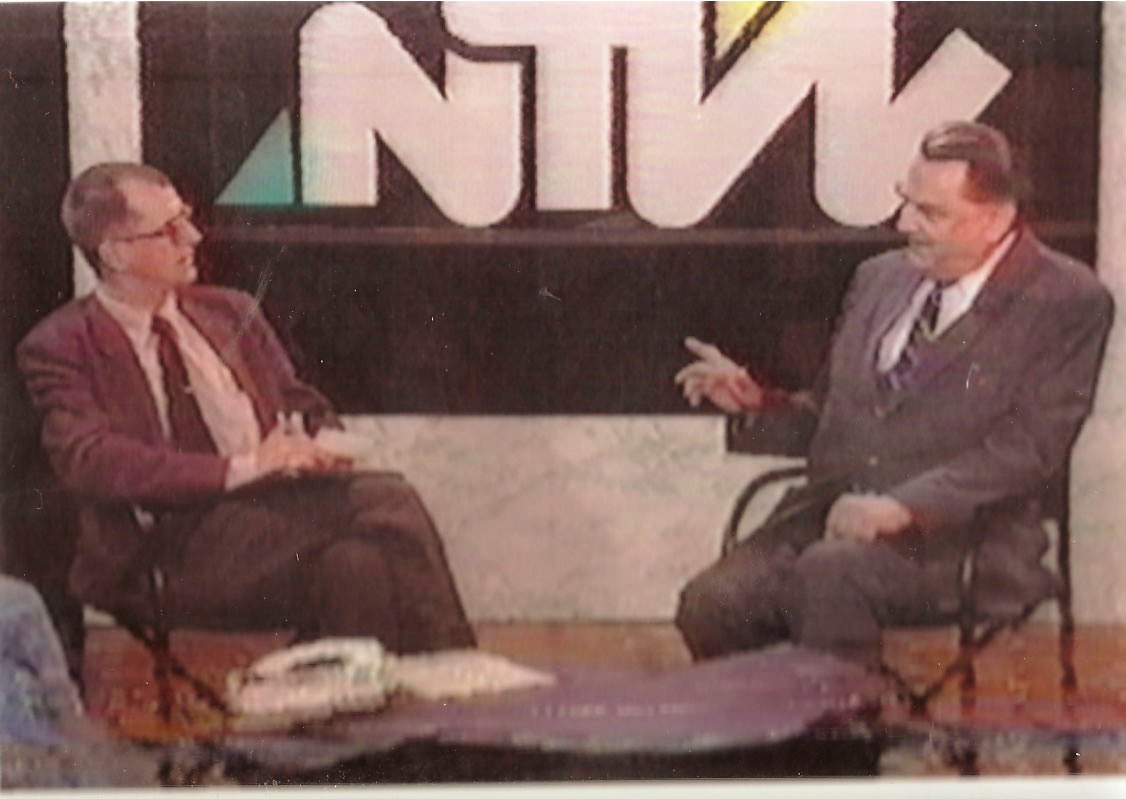
Olszewski (right) defending his government's actions on Andrzej Tadeusz Kijowski's talk show in July 1993

Following the oath of office, Olszewski's government faced difficulties on many fronts. Previously, Olszewski had placed deep criticism on Finance Minister Leszek Balcerowicz from the previous two administrations and his controversial Balcerowicz Plan, vigorously opposing the minister's shock therapy program. Removing Balcerowicz from the cabinet, Olszewski selected Karol Lutowski, a known critic of shock therapy, as his replacement. With unemployment rising to 11.4 percent and the nation's gross domestic product declining by ten percent over the course of one year, the Olszewski government faced pressure to amend the unpopular economic plan. Despite his professed monetarist beliefs, Olszewski pushed for a package of reforms to loosen credit, ease earlier anti-inflation policies, reintroduce price supports for a number of agricultural products, and release more subsidies to the state sector of the Polish economy.

Included in his industrial interventionist policy, the premier also proposed the unification of the nation's economic ministries to coordinate ongoing privatizations, as well as for all industrial and trade policies. When put to a vote, however, the deeply fragmented Sejm rejected Olszewski's reform packages, due to objections that the proposals were overly domineering or were too weak. Over the course of his government, the Sejm proved to be a barrier to any strong reforms. Olszewski explained his views on economic reforms in an interview with Anthony Murawski in the summer of 1992, published in September 1992 in Multinational Monitor magazine (founded by Ralph Nader). In particular, the prime minister's plans to reverse the Balcerowicz Plan proved impossible due to his fragile minority government. Without majority support, Olszewski relied on the conditional support of Tadeusz Mazowiecki's Democratic Union and Jan Krzysztof Bielecki's Liberal Democratic Congress, yet both men and their respective parties insisted on prioritizing economic reforms. Within the government itself, the relationship between the seven parties composing the coalition was fragile at best, teetering on collapse by March 1992. Under pressure from the president to expand the coalition, Olszewski turned to the Democratic Union and the Confederation of Independent Poland, though the Union insisted on a conservative budget before it could join the cabinet.

As with the two previous administrations, the Olszewski government's foreign policy continued to steer towards the West, with the stated desire of joining NATO. The prime minister's selection of Jan Parys as defense minister indicated a policy hostile to Russia while Foreign Minister Krzysztof Skubiszewski, a veteran of the previous Mazowiecki and Bielecki governments, pursued efforts of moderation and compromise, balancing relations between the West and Moscow. President Wałęsa, however, sharply disagreed with the prime minister, arguing that foreign policy efforts instead should drive towards building an alternative military alliance with fellow ex-Warsaw Pact states. Wałęsa's proposals coincided with his own security uncertainties over the recent violent collapse of Yugoslavia, the dissolution of the Soviet Union, and from a fear that joining NATO would put Poland in an opposing position to Russia. In response, Olszewski accused Skubiszewski, and by extension Wałęsa, who both advocated cooperation with Russia in regards to troop withdrawals, of "Finlandizing" foreign policy.

Individuals close to the Olszewski government, like Jarosław Kaczyński, referred to Wałęsa's Belweder residence as a den of Russian interests, which was determined to "maintain and protect the communist set-up" and control Russian influence in Polish internal affairs. Additionally, both men stood at odds over Polish-Ukrainian relations, with Olszewski arguing that the relationship with Kyiv needed equal footing with Polish-Russian relations. At the same time, relations with the West financially soured under Olszewski's tenureship. In the face of the premier's attempts to stimulate the economy by proposing to raise the budget deficit, the International Monetary Fund demanded instead a restrictive budget in order to resume lending. Particularly, Western donor states pressured Olszewski to replace Lutowski as finance minister. When Olszewski reshuffled ministers, placing Andrzej Olechowski at the Ministry of Finance, observers believed that the premier had reverted to a hard-line economic reform posture. Yet when the Sejm passed a bill authorizing salary and pension increases, raising the budget deficit by fifty percent, Olechowski fiercely objected and resigned from the cabinet, claiming he did not have "the slightest idea" of how to explain the government's economic reasoning to the IMF.

=== De-communization and the Parys affair ===
The conflict between Olszewski and Wałęsa continued to escalate throughout 1992, culminating in a major political crisis by that summer. As premier, Olszewski portrayed himself and his government as staunchly anti-communist, arguing that in the year 1992, Poland continued to remain a communist country. Claiming that communist agents remained in all corridors of economic and political power, Olszewski argued for a purge, particularly of those in the economic sector, whom Olszewski believed were holding back Poland's new capitalist free market and kept workers bound. "The invisible hand [of the market]", Olszewski said, was "simply the hand of the swindler plundering funds from the state treasury". As such, Olszewski argued for increased democratization and de-communinization at all levels of Polish society. Olszewski's drive towards de-communization was also reflected in his cabinet. Jan Parys, Olszewski's defense minister, actively pursued efforts to de-communize the Polish Armed Forces and establish civilian ministerial control. These plans ran in conjunction with Wałęsa's efforts to stake executive control over the defense establishment. Parys and Wałęsa repeatedly clashed over plans to reorganize national security commands, with Parys effectively challenging Wałęsa's role as commander in chief by claiming ministerial rights over the armed forces.

The clash between both men came to a head in April 1992, when, upon learning of a meeting between National Security Bureau Director Jerzy Milewski, a close Wałęsa ally, with Polish Army General Tadeusz Wilecki, promising the general's promotion to the high command, Parys accused the presidency of interfering with the defense ministry's portfolio. Parys stated that "certain politicians" promised promotions to army officers in exchange "for a kind of army support for political maneuvers". Parys further elaborated that "politicians who undertake such moves behind my back are simply involved in intrigue", believing that "they are working to the detriment of the army and Poland; they simply are political schemers. To put it briefly: the Polish Army will help no one striving to abolish democracy in Poland". Parys's implication of a possible coup d'etat on the behalf of Wałęsa and his allies with bribed high-ranking military officials rocked the entire Polish political establishment. To quiet the political storm, Olszewski responded by placing Parys on administrative leave. In response, a parliamentary commission was quickly created in the Sejm to investigate Parys's claims. The commission's findings cleared Wałęsa of wrongdoing and declared Parys's claims as baseless and "unfounded", forcing the defense minister to resign. In the aftermath of the Parys affair, Wałęsa bitterly complained of the Olszewski government's handling of the controversy, declaring the government's civilian leaders of endangering both national security and the professionalism of the military. The relationship between Olszewski and Wałęsa further soured with Olszewski's appointment of Radosław Sikorski as deputy defense minister without presidential consultation, a move interpreted as the premier vying for influence within the armed forces.

=== Clashes with Wałęsa ===
The deepening chasm between both men began to interrupt foreign policy. As both men sought to assert control over the economy, the military, and international relations, particularly over-sensitive negotiations to withdraw Russian Army units from the country, Foreign Minister Krzysztof Skubiszewski admitted that by May 1992, "[i]t was difficult to conduct the foreign policy of an internally unstable country". The overlying reason for the clash between both men emanated from the fact that both the prime minister and the president believed their respective offices carried the prerogative to direct government policy, particularly in the defence, interior, and foreign ministries. As premier, Olszewski believed that his position, along with the collective Council of Ministers, held precedence in conducting the affairs of state. On the other side, President Wałęsa believed that as the chief executive and head of state he was ultimately responsible for the direction of the republic's affairs. The clash between both offices created a highly charged and disruptive political environment. Despite this instability, Skubiszewski continued to negotiate with his Russian counterparts on financial and business settlements in regards to the pullout of Russian Army units from the country. Skubiszewski's diplomatic efforts to reach a compromise with his Russian colleagues were met with vehement criticism from Olszewski, with many close to the premier believing that any monetary or trade settlements constituted a renewed occupation. Despite the premier's strong objections to the Foreign Ministry's negotiations with their Russian counterparts, President Wałęsa strongly supported such moves for a final agreement. Meetings between Olszewski and Wałęsa in May 1992 displayed the divide between both men, with the premier insisting on removing any article on joint Polish-Russian financial and business deals from the treaty while Wałęsa responded that he intended to visit Russia not "to negotiate any agreement, but to sign it".

=== Dismissal ===
By late May, Olszewski's fragile coalition faced collapse. Shortly after returning from Moscow from signing the cooperation treaty on 26 May 1992, Wałęsa formally asked the Sejm to withdraw its support from Olszewski's premiership, stating he had no faith in the government. The president cited the government's "irresponsible steps in foreign affairs" as part of his decision. Two days later on 28 May, with half of parliament's members absent, Sejm member Janusz Korwin-Mikke of the small conservative-libertarian Real Politics Union successfully pressed for and passed a motion requiring the Ministry of Interior to identify all of the republic's leading politicians who collaborated previously in the communist secret services. Despite the resolution, opposition parties, including the Democratic Union, the Liberal Democratic Congress and the Polish Economic Program (a split faction of the Polish Beer-Lovers' Party), moved to file a vote of no confidence. Responding to the lustration resolution six days later on 4 June, Interior Minister Antoni Macierewicz released to all parliamentary faction heads a secret list of 64 names of communist-era collaborators drawn from his ministry's archives.

Known as the Macierewicz List, which was quickly leaked to the public, the roster included Wiesław Chrzanowski, the Marshal of the Sejm and a member of Olszewski's coalition as well as Leszek Moczulski, the head of the opposition Confederation of Independent Poland. A second list published shortly afterwards included President Wałęsa himself. In response, Wałęsa immediately demanded for the government's dismissal, yet in private, the president confessed to opposition legislators his worries that Olszewski was orchestrating a last minute coup against him. Late on the night of 4 June, on the eve of his vote of confidence, Olszewski made an unplanned televised address on public broadcasters TVP1 and 2, defending his administration's lustration list and appealing for the public to rally behind the government:

My government was the first to want to reveal old, secret relationships of individuals who recently volunteered to enter into the state's new administration. I believe that the Polish people should know those who govern them, including those who helped the UB and SB to keep Poles enslaved. I believe the collaborators of the former communist political police constitute a threat to the security of the free Polish people. The people should know that not coincidentally, just at the moment when we can finally break away from communist ties, there is a sudden move for the government's dismissal.

In the early hours after midnight on 5 June, in an event known as the nocna zmiana ("the nightshift"), the Sejm convened for a vote of no confidence. Despite Olszewski's public appeals both on television and within the debating chamber, parliament's majority opinion became readily apparent of supporting his dismissal. Aside from the opposition post-communist Democratic Left Alliance, members of the Tadeusz Mazowiecki-oriented Democratic Union, the Liberal Democrats, and other centrist and liberal parties remained unfazed with their loss of confidence with the prime minister. The opposition was joined from the right by the Confederation of Independent Poland, whose members derided the Olszewski government's attempt at radical lustration just before a vote of confidence as outright blackmail. Facing certain defeat, an emotional Olszewski addressed the Sejm, stating:

"I would like to get out of this place with just one achievement. And as of this moment, I have the belief that I will go out with it. I would like to say when this period finishes when time runs out for me—I admit—a terribly painful time, when in my hometown's streets, I can only move about by car or in the company of guards protecting me from human contact—when my time does finally finish—I can take to the streets of my city freely again, to move about and look people in the eye. And that for you, honourable members is what I wish for after this vote."

The vote of no confidence was approved, with 273 in favour and 119 against. Olszewski was immediately replaced by Wałęsa ally Waldemar Pawlak of the Polish People's Party. Pawlak's government failed to gain support from Sejm majority and failed in a vote of confidence. Pawlak later resigned and Wałęsa replaced him by Hanna Suchocka, who won support from the majority. Two weeks following the government's no-confidence vote, the Constitutional Tribunal ruled 11–1 the Sejm's 28 May lustration resolution singling out alleged communist collaborators as illegal due to it not being a statutory enactment, as well as violating both the dignity of citizens and democratic values. The list produced by former Interior Minister Macierewicz was similarly found to be filled with inaccuracies, forcing the ministry to later apologize to several of those falsely implicated.

== Post-Premiership ==
=== Parliamentary career: 1992–2005 ===
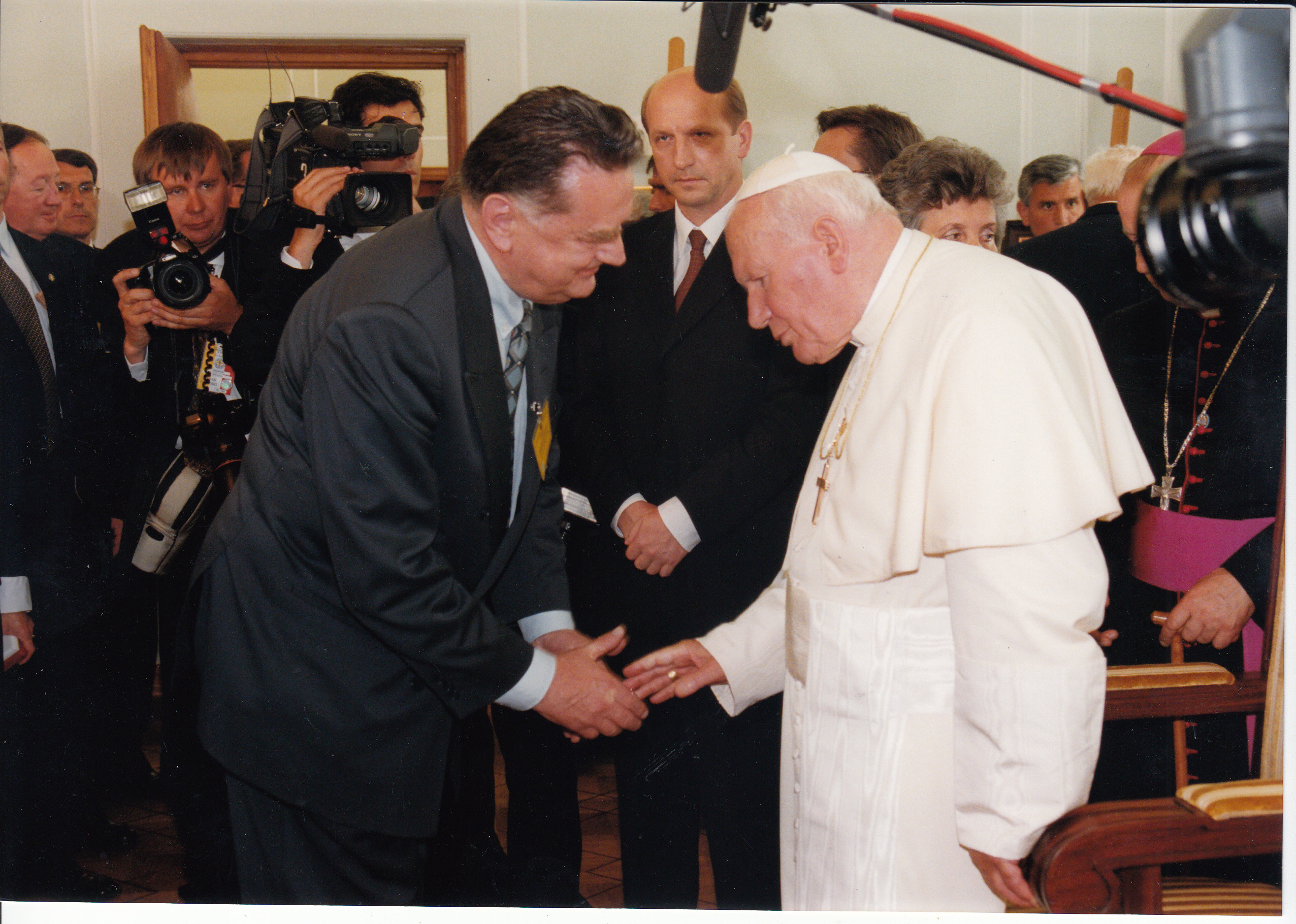
Olszewski greeting Pope John Paul II to the Sejm and Senate Complex, 1999

Following his dismissal, Olszewski resumed his career as a member of the Sejm. Olszewski departed from the Centre Agreement in the summer of 1992 with a number of other rebel MPs, creating the Movement for the Republic. The new party was joined by other anti-Wałęsa and former Solidarity supporters, carrying a quasi-nationalist and ultra-Catholic platform. As a parliamentarian, Olszewski led his club's opposition to the Small Constitution, believing it did not offer a clear break from the Stalinist constitution of 1956. Olszewski led his party to support the vote of no confidence against Prime Minister Hanna Suchocka in 1993, believing her economic policies had harmed the state. In the subsequent elections that year, Olszewski lost his seat as the electorate swung to the Democratic Left Alliance (led by Aleksander Kwaśniewski), despite a failed attempt to reunite rightist forces with the Centre Agreement, now headed by Jarosław Kaczyński.

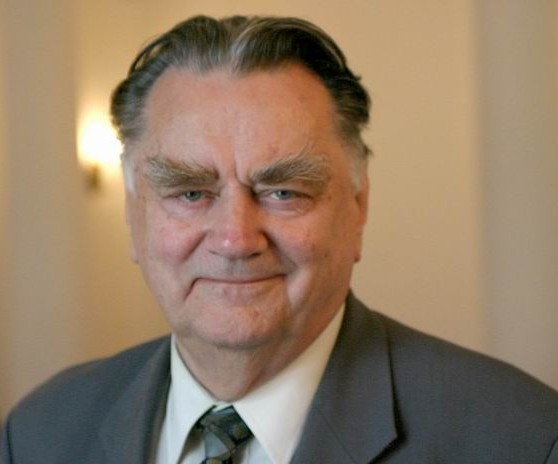
Olszewski in 2006

In 1995, Olszewski launched a bid for the presidency in that year's presidential election in order to replace his rival Wałęsa. Campaigning on an anti-communist and patriotic platform, Olszewski garnered 1,225,453 votes, with nearly seven percent of the vote and earned fourth place. However, both he and Wałęsa lost to winning left-wing candidate Aleksander Kwaśniewski from Social Democracy. Later in the same year, in an attempt to consolidate the former premier's relatively strong performance in the presidential ballot, Olszewski and his supporters established the Movement for the Reconstruction of Poland.

Under the new party banner, poll numbers initially gave Olszewski's block a sixteen percent approval rating by the middle of 1996, yet this period was cut short with the creation of Solidarity Electoral Action, a rival conservative alliance led by Marian Krzaklewski. The results of the 1997 parliamentary election garnered Olszewski's party with 5.6 percent of the vote, returning the former premier to the Sejm with six seats. During this period, Olszewski supported Prime Minister Jerzy Buzek's 1997 concordant with the Holy See, reasoning that the Catholic Church was "one of the most important, if not the most important, and certainly the most durable, longest-running and most rooted institution in Polish national life and culture". At the same time, Olszewski also generally supported European integration and the government's efforts for Poland's accession into the European Union, though stressed reservations on the economic conditions of integration, particularly insisting that the national banking sector must remain within domestic hands. However, the Movement became increasingly marginalized due to numerous party splits.

During the 2000 presidential election, Olszewski stood again as a candidate, but withdrew from the race shortly before the vote and later supported the Solidarity Electoral Action candidate Marian Krzaklewski. Olszewski was reelected to the Sejm in 2001, with his party allied with the populist far-right League of Polish Families. However, Olszewski broke with the League shortly after his reelection over policy differences. Prior to Poland's admission into the EU in 2004, Olszewski expressed worry that Poland's accession to the European Union would pave the way for Germans to make property claims regarding land seized during the population expulsions at the end of World War II. The former premier also expressed in 2005 his support for strong security and political relations with the United States within a transatlantic framework, though expressed reservations to stronger ties with Germany until property claims were dealt with.

In 2005, Olszewski, along with his former cabinet ministers Antoni Macierewicz and Gabriel Janowski, created the Patriotic Movement, a right-wing nationalist political block combining the forces of his own party with those of the National-Catholic Movement and the Polish Alliance, where he became the head of the new organization. In that year's parliamentary election, Olszewski ran for a Senate seat in the Warsaw constituency for the Law and Justice list, but was defeated, coming sixth. Following his exit from parliament after his failed Senat bid, Olszewski was appointed as deputy chairman of the State Tribunal between 2005 and 2006. President Lech Kaczyński later appointed Olszewski as a presidential adviser in April 2006, a position he held until Kaczyński's death in the 2010 Smolensk air disaster.

== Personal life and death ==
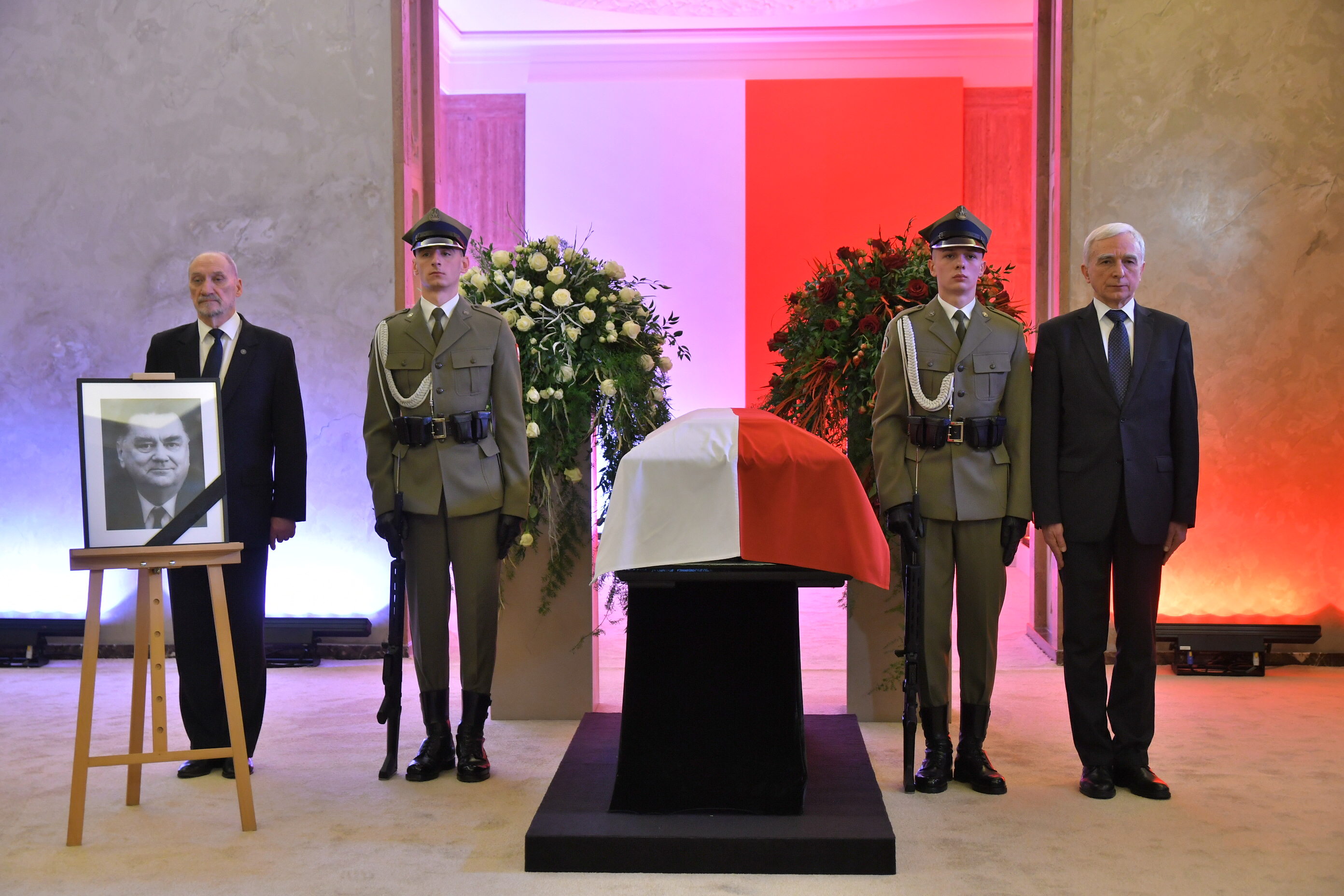
Olszewski lying in state before the funeral in Warszaw

Olszewski was married to Marta Olszewska, a former activist, editor and journalist of Tygodnik Solidarność. On the night of 16 August 2000, Olszewski was involved in a deadly car crash on national road 8 near the village of Marków-Towarzystwo in Masovian Voivodeship, when the car Olszewski was a passenger in collided with a truck. The driver of the car (Olszewski's party treasurer) was killed in the crash, while Olszewski escaped with only minor injuries. In July 2014, Olszewski was made an honorary citizen of Warsaw by Mayor Hanna Gronkiewicz-Waltz for his participation in the Warsaw Uprising as well as citing his moral and social authority in service of the city. Olszewski died after a long illness on 7 February 2019 in a Warsaw hospital.

=== Legacy ===
Olszewski remains a controversial figure within Polish politics. Members of the right-wing, particularly Law and Justice leader Jarosław Kaczyński, have praised the former premier for his anti-communist stances and legal principles. On the twentieth anniversary of the Olszewski government's vote of no confidence in 2012, Kaczyński praised Olszewski for attempting to stop the rapid privatizations of the early 1990s, and having helped steer Poland towards its eventual integration into NATO.

Former Interior Minister Antoni Macierewicz also affirmed his personal belief in 2012 that had the Olszewski government not fallen, "the Smolensk disaster would never have transpired".

Politicians on the centre-right have viewed Olszewski more critically. Christian National Union politician Stefan Niesiołowski strongly defended Olszewski during his vote of no confidence in 1992, declaring to the premier's detractors that "you're making a political mistake and Poland won't forget this error". In an interview in 2007, Niesiołowski (now a Civic Platform parliamentarian) regretted his defense of the former prime minister in hindsight, describing Olszewski as "being a poor man who supported a moral lie" with the Macierewicz List, "and was still silent".

Prime Minister Donald Tusk similarly accused Olszewski of misleading information in 2008 during a non-governmental investigation into communist era archives conducted by the former premier, declaring: "I know that in Poland there are politicians who have genuinely strange archives and cannot get used to the idea that they're no longer prime ministers or heads of committees anymore, spending instead a lifetime in these archives, poisoning our public space with their own interpretations of what they have found".

In an opinion poll conducted by CBOS in 2014, asking respondents to evaluate who was the best prime minister of the Third Republic, Olszewski was placed at seventh place. A similar poll conducted by Millward Brown later that year positioned Olszewski at sixth place.

== Works cited ==
- Betz, David (2004). Civil-Military Relations in Russia and Eastern Europe. London: RoutledgeCurzon. ISBN 0415648866.
- Brown, J. F., ed. (1996). The Omri Annual Survey of Eastern Europe and the Former Soviet Union, 1996: Forging Ahead, Falling Behind. Armonk, NY: M.E. Sharpe. ISBN 1563249251.
- Bugajski, Janusz (1994). Ethnic Politics in Eastern Europe: A Guide to Nationality Policies, Organizations and Parties. Armonk, NY: M.E. Sharpe. ISBN 1563242826.
- Cannon, Lucja Swiatkowski (1997). "Polish Transition Strategy.". In Jane Shapiro Zacek; Ilpyong J. Kim (eds.). Legacy of the Soviet Bloc. Gainesville, FL: University Press of Florida. ISBN 0813014751.
- Epstein, Rachel (2008). In Pursuit of Liberalism: International Institutions in Postcommunist Europe. Baltimore: Johns Hopkins University Press. ISBN 9780801889776.
- Goldman, Minton F. (1997). Revolution and Change in Central and Eastern Europe: Political, Economic, and Social Challenges. Armonk, NY: M.E. Sharpe. ISBN 1563247585.
- Gorska, Joanna A. (2000). Dealing with a Juggernaut: Analyzing Poland's Policy toward Russia, 1989–2009. Lanham, MD: Lexington Books. ISBN 0739145320.
- Jeffries, Ian (1993). Socialist Economies and the Transition to the Market: A Guide. London: Routledge. ISBN 0415075807.
- Laba, Roman (1991). The Roots of Solidarity: A Political Sociology of Poland's Working-Class Democratization. Princeton, NJ: Princeton University Press. ISBN 0691078629.
- Lipski, Jan Józef (1985). KOR: A History of the Workers' Defense Committee in Poland, 1976–1981. Berkeley, CA: University of California Press. ISBN 0-520-05243-9.
- Millard, Frances (1996). "Poland's 'return to Europe,' 1989-94.". In Robert Bideleux; Richard Taylor (eds.). European Integration and Disintegration: East and West. New York City: Routledge. ISBN 9780415137416.
- Millard, Frances (2009). Democratic Elections in Poland, 1991–2007. London: Taylor & Francis. ISBN 978-0203872727.
- Ost, David (2005). The Defeat of Solidarity: Anger and Politics in Postcommunist Europe. Ithaca, NY: Cornell University Press. ISBN 0801473438.
- Pankowski, Rafal (2010). The Populist Radical Right in Poland: The Patriots (Extremism and Democracy). London: Routledge. ISBN 978-0415473538.
- Preuße, Detlev (2014). Umbruch von unten: Die Selbstbefreiung Mittel- und Osteuropas und das Ende der Sowjetjunion. Wiesbaden: Springer VS Press. ISBN 978-3658049713.
- Schwartz, Herman (2000). The Struggle for Constitutional Justice in Post-Communist Europe. Chicago: University of Chicago Press. ISBN 0226741966.
- Simon, Jeffrey (1996). "The Code and Civil-Military Relations: The Polish Case.". In Gert C. de Nooy (ed.). Cooperative Security, the Osce, and Its Code of Conduct. The Hague: Kluwer Law International. ISBN 9041103163.
- Spero, Joshua B. (2004). Bridging the European Divide: Middle Power Politics and Regional Security Dilemmas. Lanham, MD: Rowman & Littlefield. ISBN 0742535533.
- Stone, Randall W. (2002). Lending Credibility: The International Monetary Fund and the Post-Communist Transition. Princeton, NJ: Princeton University Press. ISBN 0691095299.
- Szczerbiak, Aleks (2001). Poles Together?: The Emergence and Development of Political Parties in Post-communist Poland. Budapest: Central European University Press. ISBN 9639241237.
- Tismaneanu, Vladimir (1998). Fantasies of Salvation: Democracy, Nationalism, and Myth in Post-Communist Europe. Princeton, NJ: Princeton University Press. ISBN 0691048266.
- Weiner, Robert (1994). Change in Eastern Europe. Westport, CT: Praeger Publishers. ISBN 978-0275945398.
- Wróbel, Piotr J. (2010). "Rebuilding Democracy in Poland, 1989–2004.". In M. B. B. Biskupski; James S. Pula; Piotr J. Wróbel (eds.). The Origins of Modern Polish Democracy. Athens, OH: Ohio University Press. ISBN 978-0821418925.
- Ziolkowska-Boehm, Aleksandra (2013). Melchior Wankowicz: Poland's Master of the Written Word. Lanham, MD: Lexington Books. ISBN 978-0-7391-7590-3.

Political offices
Preceded by Jan Krzysztof Bielecki	Prime Minister of Poland; 1991–1992	Succeeded by Waldemar Pawlak
