= Stanisław Tymiński =

Canadian-Polish politician (born 1948)

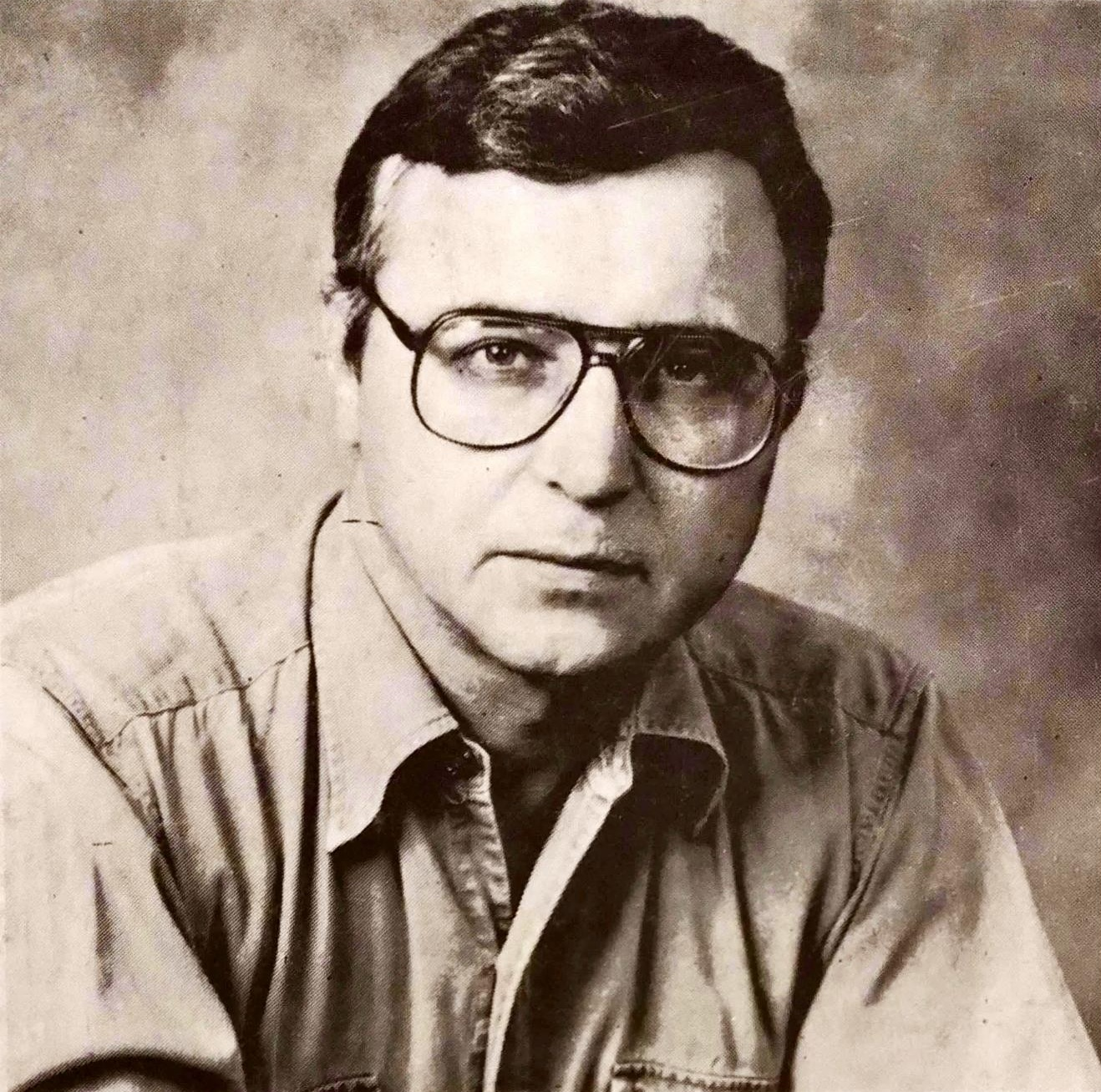
- Stanisław Tymiński in 1990
- Born: January 27, 1948 (age 78); Pruszków, Poland
- Occupation: Businessman
- Known for: Finishing second in 1990 Polish presidential election

Stanisław "Stan" Tymiński (Polish pronunciation: [staˈɲiswaf tɨˈmʲiɲskʲi]; born January 27, 1948) is a Canadian businessman of Polish origin, dealing in electronics and computers, and a sometime-politician in both Poland and Canada. Although Tymiński was born in Pruszków, he was a completely unknown person in his native country until shortly before the 1990 Polish presidential election. During this election, Tymiński emerged from the first ballot as the second strongest candidate; he defeated liberal prime minister Tadeusz Mazowiecki and forcing Solidarity leader Lech Wałęsa to stand a second ballot. After Wałęsa defeated him by a wide margin, Tymiński was a leader of Party X in Poland (1990–1995) and then returned to Canada to resume his business activities. Tymiński also contested the 2005 Polish presidential election.

== 1990 campaign ==
In 1990/1991, Tymiński led the Libertarian Party of Canada, a minor party which never received more than 0.3% of the vote. At the same time, he started a political career in his native Poland, where democracy had just been re-established and repeatedly ran for President, and was accused of hiding Jewish heritage .

In the first free presidential elections on November 25, 1990, the two most promising candidates were Solidarity leader Lech Wałęsa and prime minister Tadeusz Mazowiecki. Wałęsa, the electrician, union leader and people's tribune, had the image of an emotional, shirtsleeves populist, while lawyer and former Solidarity legal advisor Mazowiecki appeared as a more respectable and intellectual, but also more formal compromiser.

Tymiński ran as a maverick candidate. He overtook Mazowiecki (18.1%) with 23.1% of the vote and placed second behind Wałęsa with 40.0%. As no candidate had achieved the absolute majority, a second ballot was required; it was held on December 9, 1990. In the second round, Tymiński lost to Wałęsa with just 25.8% of the total vote. The voter turnout in the ballots was 60.6% and 53.4%, respectively.

The reasons for Tymiński's unexpected success remain unclear. Tymiński promised to create wealth for everyone quickly, and had an image as a patriotic Pole who had "made it" abroad. He was well received at a time when radical political changes were taking place, but the overall economic situation was getting worse: by the end of 1990, unemployment had increased from nearly zero to 6.5 percent, and gross national income had dropped by over 11 percent: the opening up of the economy had had a particularly negative effect on the standard of living for workers in sunset industries, small farmers and pensioners. Many people were increasingly disappointed with the conflict that had broken out within the former anti-communist opposition, making the unknown but seemingly honest and patriotic candidate appealing.

Another potential factor was that Tymiński applied methods of political marketing which were unknown in Poland at that time. A key element of his campaign was a black briefcase he was rarely seen without – allegedly containing "secret documents" that were going to destroy his rivals' careers and that he would present when the time was due. Although the elections went by without the briefcase ever being opened, its presence secured constant attention. Tymiński's adversaries took to a similar strategy; the renowned daily Gazeta Wyborcza, which supported Mazowiecki, reported that Tymiński had had contact with the secret police apparatus himself, a story that was not withdrawn until after the elections. However, Tymiński did admit that several former colonels and lieutenant colonels from the Polish secret police were employed by his campaign, although he characterised this as an act of charity on his behalf. Meanwhile, during a televised debate with Tymiński ahead of the second round vote, Wałęsa responded to Tymiński's claim that the briefcase contained incriminating material regarding Wałęsa's private life by demanding that the documents be published immediately, which Tymiński declined to do.

Foreign policy analyst John Feffer, who described Tymiński as "...a rich businessman, an outspoken outsider with a love of conspiracy theories", has suggested that his 1990 campaign served as a prototype for later campaigns by right-wing populist politicians such as Viktor Orbán, Jarosław Kaczyński and Donald Trump, by appealing to those who had lost out from the advance of globalization.

== Party X ==
Tymiński, who had run as a nonpartisan candidate, founded a party of his own, which he called Party X, with a nationalist political profile. However, Tymiński's charisma did not translate into any long-term success for the party; in the 1991 general elections, his "X-Party" achieved just three seats in the Sejm. It did not contest any seats in 1997 and was formally disbanded in 1999.

== 2005 campaign ==
On March 24, 2005, in an interview for a South American Polish organization, Tymiński announced his readiness to run in the upcoming 2005 Polish presidential election; an announcement he had previously made in more vague terms on his own homepage. On 3 June, Tymiński returned to Poland and officially declared his candidacy on behalf of a splinter party named the "All-Polish Citizens Coalition" (Ogólnopolska Koalicja Obywatelska). The party, whose acronym OKO, translates as "eye", was founded by Wojciech Kornowski, a businessman who set up a network of eye surgery clinics in Poland. Kornowski, a former chairman of the Polish Employers Association (Konfederacja Pracodawców Polskich), has been trying to enter Polish politics for more than two decades by establishing contacts with completely different political milieus ranging from the communist Polish United Workers' Party in the 1980s to Andrzej Lepper's Samoobrona party. In 2004, his new outfit OKO received 0.6% of the vote in the 2004 European Parliament election in Poland. Refusing to make palpable political statements, Tymiński and Kornowski converge in their vague "pro-business" and "anti-establishment" message. Tymiński's campaign attracted some media attention.

In late July 2005, Tymiński was the first presidential candidate to successfully collect all 100,000 signatures making him an official candidate. During the first round of the 2005 Polish presidential election, held on October 9, Tymiński received 23,545 votes or 0.2% of all valid votes.

== Business interests ==
Tymiński was involved in developing the internet industry in Poland: in 1994, he was the first to offer Internet access "for everyone", included in Poland's first commercial bulletin board system "Maloka" (see pl:Maloka BBS). However, when the national telephone company Telekomunikacja Polska S.A. (TPSA) offered internet dial-up service, Maloka closed down in 1996.

As of 2020s, Tymiński has been operating his computer business in Canada and writing columns for various Polish-language periodicals in Canada and the United States. He has also been a Trade Representative of Belarus in Canada.

Party political offices
| Preceded by Dennis Corrigan | Libertarian Party of Canada leaders 1990–1991 | Succeeded by George Dance |
