= Czesław Warsewicz =

Polish businessman

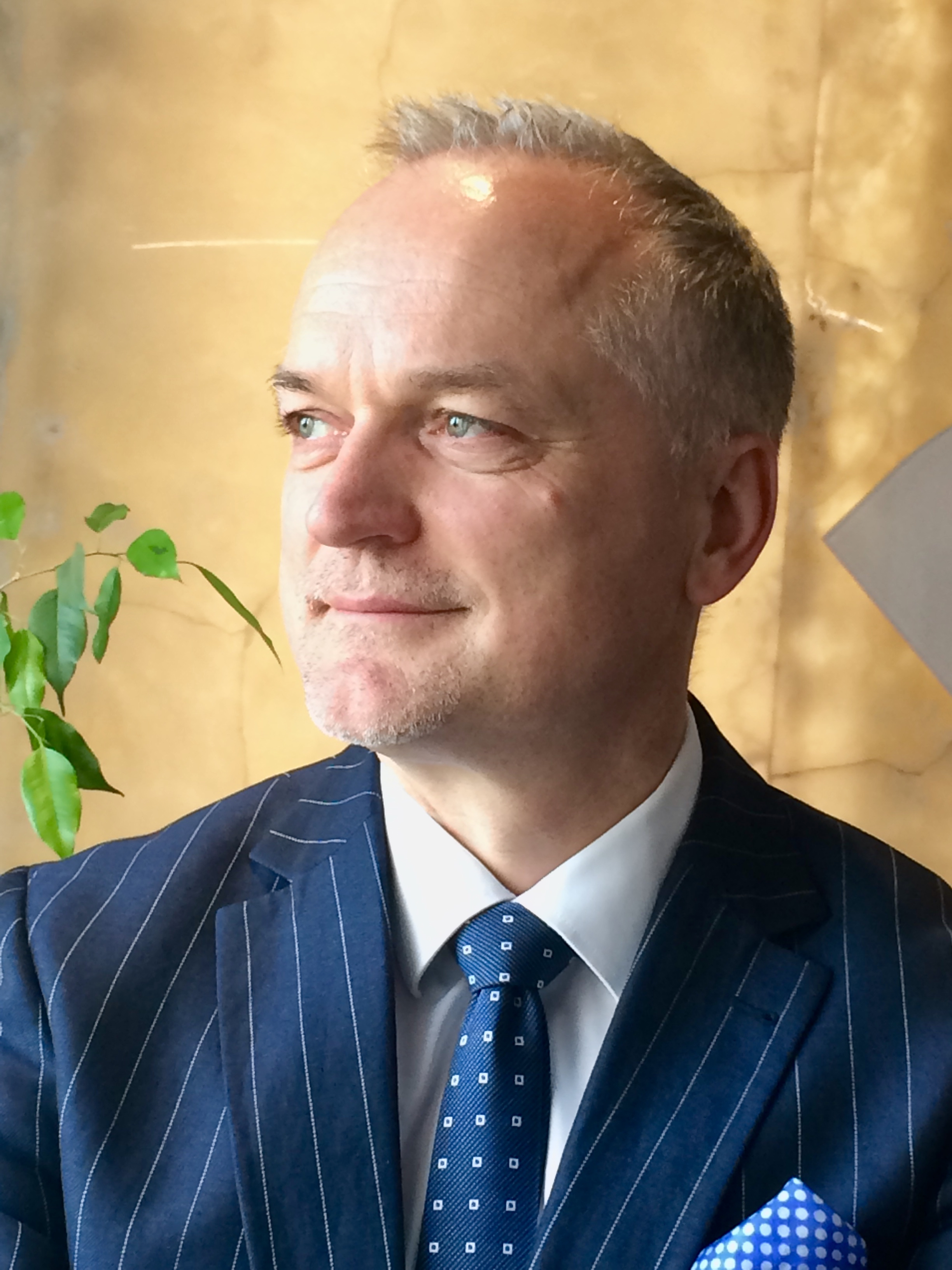
- Born: 1969 (age 56–57)
- Education: Warsaw School of Economics

Czesław Warsewicz (born 1969) is a Polish businessman and entrepreneur.

== Education ==
Warsewicz graduated in economics from Warsaw School of Economics in 1994 and from IESE Business School (Advanced Management Program, 2007).

== Business career ==
He took part in the privatisation of a few Polish companies, and before starting his job with PKP Intercity he was the CFO in Rolimpex-Nasiona Sp. z o.o. (1998 – 2006). In the years 2006 - 2009, he was the President of the PKP Intercity SA Management Board. Currently, he is the President of the management board of a strategic consulting company under the name "Blue Ocean" Business Consulting sp. O.o., specializing in the development of transport plans for local government units. He is a Member of the Law and Justice Program Council responsible for preparing the program in the field of transport, in particular rail.

Since March 2018 he is the CEO of PKP Cargo S.A.

== Awards and commendations ==
- 2009 Wektor-Award of Konfederacji Pracodawców Polskich.

Preceded by Jacek Prześluga	PKP Intercity CEO; 2006-2009	Succeeded by Krzysztof Celiński
