= Sebastian Mikosz =

- Born: 1973 (age 52–53)
- Education: Sciences Po
- Occupations: Economist, executive director

Sebastian Mikosz (born 1973) is a Polish economist and executive director. In 2009–2011 and 2013–2015 he was the President of the Management Board of LOT Polish Airlines, in 2017–2019 CEO of the Kenya Airways group, then in 2020–2022 Senior Vice President of the International Air Transport Association and from 2024 CEO of the Polish Post.

== Biography ==
Graduate of the Institute of Political Studies in France with a master's degree in economics and finance.

In 1997–2000, employee of Arthur Andersen in Paris, where he worked in the emerging markets team and was responsible for servicing companies investing in Poland, Central Europe and the former Soviet republics.

In 2000–2003 he co-founded and managed the online brokerage house Fast Trade. Since 2001 he has been the general director of the French-Polish Chamber of Commerce (CCIFP). In 2003–2006 he was the vice-president of the Polish Information and Foreign Investment Agency (PAIiIZ), where he supervised, among others, the Investor Services Department and the Regional Cooperation Department. In 2006–2008 he was an employee of Deloitte, where he worked for two years in the business consulting department. He was also a member of the supervisory boards of, among others, Euro Bank from the Societe Generale group and the listed company Baltona SA.

In 2009–2011 and 2013–2015 he was the president of the management board of LOT Polish Airlines, At Polish Airlines LOT, he prepared and carried out a deep restructuring, including obtaining and approving public aid, which allowed LOT to avoid bankruptcy. During his presidency, the company successfully terminated the Company Collective Labour Agreement, renegotiated fuel options and obtained compensation from Boeing for the delay and grounding of Boeing 787 Dreamliners. During his work at PLL LOT, he was the chairman of the supervisory board of Eurolot and a member of the supervisory board of LOT AMS (technical base).

In 2009–2012 he served as vice president of Employers of Poland. In 2011–2013, he cooperated with the Société Générale bank in Poland, as a senior advisor. In 2008–2012, he was vice president of the Warsaw Aeroclub. In 2015, he chaired the jury of the Polish edition of the global advertising agency competition Effie Awards. In 2015–2017, he was the president of the online travel agency eSKY.

In 2017–2019, he was the president and CEO of the Kenya Airways group. He left his position in unclear circumstances, it was reported that he had resigned, but after the annual report was released, it turned out that he had received a severance payment for being dismissed before the end of his term.

In 2020–2022, he was the senior vice president for membership and external relations at the International Air Transport Association (IATA) in Geneva, and then became the first senior vice president in the history of the organization to deal exclusively with environmental protection and sustainable development.

From February to March 2024, a member of the supervisory board of the Polish Post delegated to perform the duties of the president of the management board. From March 25 of the same year, the president of the management board of the Polish Post. During his presidency, the company terminated the Company Collective Labor Agreement and began a transformation program consisting in the dismissal of 9 thousand employees.

From April to November 2024 he was a member of the supervisory board of LOT Polish Airlines.
