= Polish Post =

National postal service of Poland

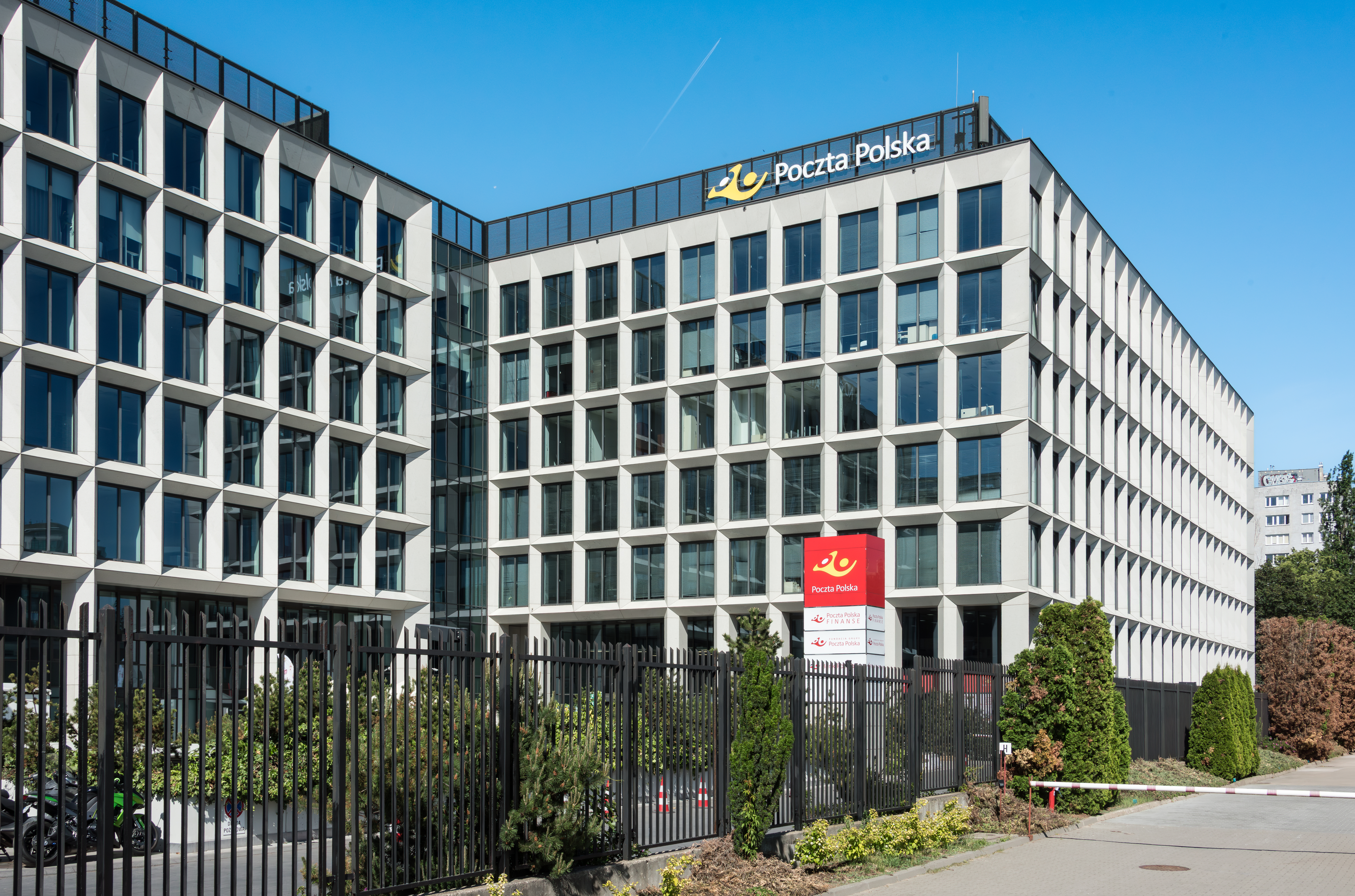
- Headquarters in Warsaw
- Native name: Poczta Polska Spółka Akcyjna
- Type: Joint-stock company
- Industry: Postal services, courier
- Founded: 18 October 1558; 467 years ago (original); 1928; 98 years ago (modern)
- Founder: Sigismund II Augustus
- Headquarters: Rodziny Hiszpańskich 8, 00-940 Warsaw, Poland
- Key people: Magdalena Gaj (Chairman)
- Services: Letter post, parcel service, EMS, delivery, freight forwarding, third-party logistics, deposit accounts
- Revenue: 1,573,000,000 (2018)
- Net income: −15,700,000 (2018)
- Owner: Government of Poland
- Number of employees: c. 67,000
- Website: www.poczta-polska.pl

The Polish Post (Polish: Poczta Polska S.A., pronounced [ˈpɔtʂta ˈpɔlska]) is the state postal administration of Poland, initially founded in 1558. The company is headquartered in Warsaw and employs over 67,000 people. It is the largest mail-handling company in the country, which additionally provides courier, banking, insurance and logistics services. The digital services, such as neo-stamps, neo-letters and neo-postcards, are available through the Internet-based platform Envelo.

The two large subsidiary companies of Poczta Polska are Capital Group Poczta Polska (Post Bank) and the Pocztowe Towarzystwo Ubezpieczeń Wzajemnych (Postal Mutual Insurance Association). The State Treasury of Poland is the sole owner and shareholder of Polish Post. The current name of the ministry responsible for the Polish Post is Ministry of State Assets.

== Statutory obligations ==
The Polish Post acts as a designated operator. i.e. operator who is responsible for providing public postal services, which for common good are provided in a uniform manner at affordable prices. The Post has the responsibility to provide, five days a week within the area of the entire country, services including clearance, sorting, transport and delivery of letters, including registered letters and declared-value letters, up to 2 kg (4.4 lb); postal parcels, including the declared-value parcels, up to 10 kg (22 lb) (parcels sent from abroad may weigh up to 20 kg [44 lb]); and postal items for the visually impaired persons up to 7 kg (15 lb). In addition, it must enable the sender, at his request, to receive the document confirming the receipt of the registered parcels.

== History ==
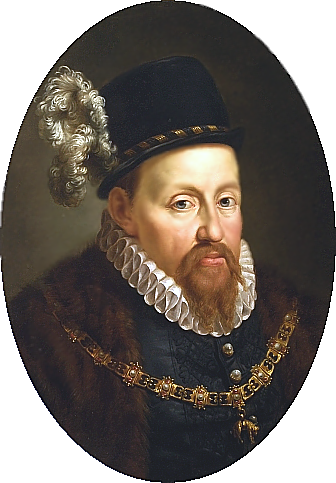
King Sigismund II Augustus established the post in 1558

The basis for the postal organization was the trading postal service, which derived from the merchants' need to communicate on commercial matters. These merchants were from Germany, and later on also from Italy, therefore most active relationships were maintained with them. In the 14th and 15th centuries Kraków was communicating with German towns through messengers, who were remunerated by commercial confraternities. The best designed trading post of this type was owned by the Fugger family who at the end of the 15th century established their factories in Kraków. Initially they were used for the trade of copper. With time, though, they started to also deal with financing operations. The Fugger Post was primary used only for the maintenance of communications between these factories and the central office in Augsburg. In later years, its services were used by the king Sigismund I of Poland, the queen Bona Sforza and the vice-chancellor Piotr Tomicki.

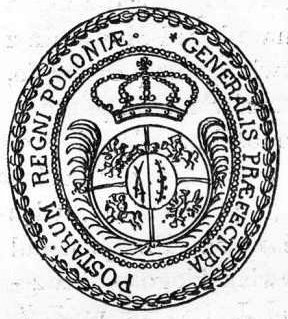
A postage seal of the Polish Crown under king Augustus III

The second serious trading postal service was the Seweryn Boner's post. Boner's banking house kept permanent agents who facilitated the forwarding of the correspondence of private persons. Seweryn Boner, in agreements with the Thurn und Taxis family post, tried to establish a regular postal service in Kraków, which was enabled on a small scale, however the enterprise was closed down after his death. The death of the Polish queen Bona Sforza in 1557 was the factor that influenced the emergence of the Polish Post, because King Sigismund II Augustus had to maintain permanent and regular correspondence with Italy in order to collect his inheritance. On the 18 October 1558 the monarch granted the right for the establishment and management of the post to the Italian Prospero Provana. In connection with that event, 18 October is the official Polish Post holiday. The services of this post, which ran from Kraków to Venice, could also be used by private persons, despite the fact that the costs of its maintenance were borne by the crown. Provana, however, started a conflict with the Thurn und Taxis family, who controlled postal communications in Austria, Hungary and Italy. This resulted after four years in the withdrawal of the benefit granted to Provan.

On 11 July 1562 the king concluded a New agreement with Krzysztof Taxis, the executive director of the imperial post in Vienna, on the basis of which, he acquired all posts in Poland, establishing the institution under the name of Poczta Polska (Polish Post), i.e. Royal post. It was composed of the Italian post (Kraków–Vienna–Venice) and Lithuanian Post (Kraków–Warsaw–Vilnius). The postal messenger left Kraków each Sunday morning, arrived in Vienna on Wednesday and then left for Venice, where he arrived after seven days journey. The courier set off to Lithuania each week on Wednesday, in order to arrive in Vilnius after a week's journey. Therefore, the letter from Kraków to Venice took 10 days and from Kraków to Vilnius 7 days. The postal charge amounted to 3 grosz from 1 lot of weight of private parcel. The king's and court's parcels were free of charge, but the monarch paid yearly subsidy for the benefit of the post in the amount of 1500 thalers (1200 for the Italian post, 300 for the Lithuanian post). This amount was collected in instalments from the Kraków duty. The director, who received the total income from the post, in return had to take care of the maintenance and its supplies. Although the Polish post under the management of a new director created new extensive and proper international connection, the contract with Taxis was terminated after two years due to various intrigues.

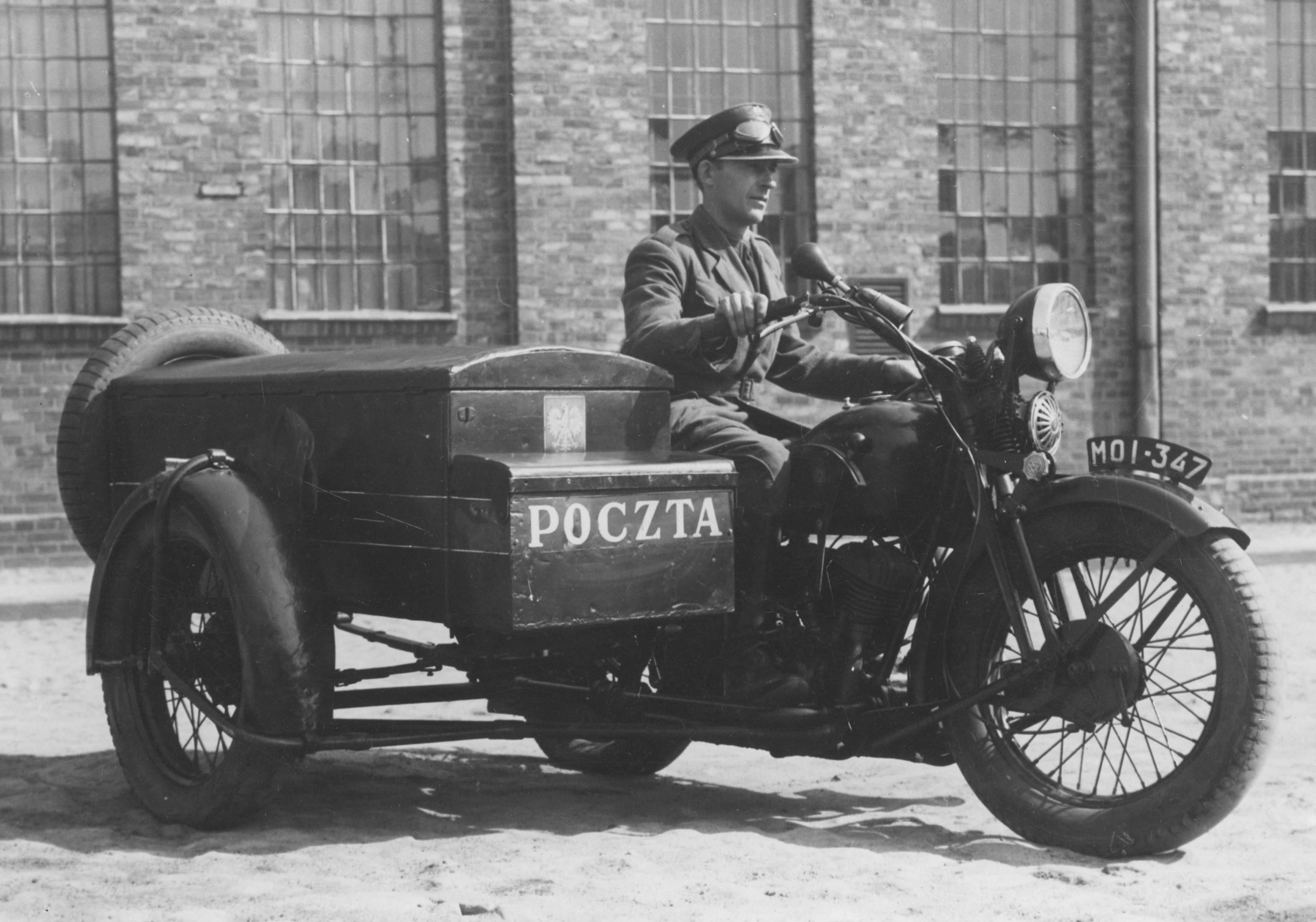
A Polish courier on Sokół 1000 motorcycle, before 1939

Italian Piotr Maffon, a Kraków bourgeois, became a new postmaster, who on 9 January 1564 was granted a special right to run the postal service within a period of five years. Within this period a significant regress of this institution was indicated, among all, there was lack of permanent connection with Venice. Due to this fact, the contract with Maffon was terminated before the deadline and Sebastiano Montelupi, who was one of the richest Kraków bourgeois, applied for the position of the postmaster. He was granted a relevant privilege on 18 November 1568, however, he took up a position of the postmaster only under the extended privilege of 22 June 1569. As of the date of taking up the post, referred to as “royal post”, by Sebastian Montelupi, its initial development phase finished. Montelupi's Royal Post was responsible for delivering the parcels to the king once a week, when the ruler was residing in any location within the Crown of the Kingdom of Poland, or once every three weeks when he was residing in Lithuania. The route to Venice was operated every 15 days and to Vilnius every 17 days. For his services Montelupi received 1300 thalers yearly and used the payments for private consignments. Furthermore, the royal carriages were also at his disposal. The Montelupi Kamienica located in Kraków at Rynek Główny no. 7 was the principal office of the post office.

In 1928 the government-owned enterprise Polish Post, Telegraph and Telephone was established. In 1939 the Defence of the Polish Post Office in Danzig (Gdańsk). In 1944 the Lublin postal district was established, which is considered to be the beginning of the contemporary Polish Post. In 1991 a section providing telecommunication services was separated from the state organizational unit PPTiT, (Telekomunikacja Polska) was created. On January 1st, 2006, Polish Post introduced the cash on delivery services, at the same time resigning from linking the cash on delivery service with other services (letters, parcels). In 2008 a new sorting center was opened in Zabrze. On 1 September 2009, Polish Post, as a result of commercialization, was transformed into a joint stock company. Until 31 August 2009 it functioned as Public Utility State Enterprise "Polish Post" (Polish: Państwowe Przedsiębiorstwo Użyteczności Publicznej "Poczta Polska"). On 1 January 2010 the Polish Post introduced the "E-PARCEL" service. On 1 January 2012 the company was reformed with the introduction of a new organizational structure, part of which 62 district branches were transformed into 17 Regions of the Network. In January 2012 the Post Office introduced the "Dimensional package" and the "Business package" services. In January 2013 the Polish Post presents a new visual identification, first post office facility of a new type was opened and a new website of the Post Office was launched. In May 2013 According to the UKE, the Polish Post delivery of letters and parcels is faster than before. In September 2013 the Polish Post introduced electronic notice In October 2013 the Polish Post introduced postal e-services: neo-stamp, neo-letter and neo-postcard. In June 2014 Polish Post launched "ecommerce.poczta-polska.pl" platform – a place comprehensive support for customers conducting business on the Internet. In November 2014 new modern machinery for sorting letters have been installed in few sorting centres of letters and parcels. In May 2014 new solutions for business called "Neofaktura" (Neofacture) i "Neorachunek" (Neobill) on Envelo platform became available. They allow keeping transactions settlement of companies or households accounts in one place on the net. From January 2015 became recognized in the same way as a traditional registered letter. In 2019 a new sorting center was opened in Białystok and in 2023 a new sorting center was opened in Lublin.

In February 2024 Sebastian Mikosz was appointed as the Chairman of the Polish Post with the goal of restructuring the company which was in a deep crisis. According to the new strategy adopted by the company management, the Polish Post is to transform itself from a traditional "letter and transfer" company that is not adapted to the needs of the market and the consumer to a modern courier-retail-financial-digital enterprise. The priority areas of transformation for 2024 and 2025 are employment, improvement of the quality of services, organizational changes and investments in the IT area. As part of the transformation plan, Polish Post plans to increase its share of revenue from parcel delivery services, retail sales, and digital and logistics services from 18% in 2022 to 59% in 2028. The share of letter distribution, hybrid services, and traditional money transfer services is to fall from 82% to 41% in the aforementioned period. Over the five years (2023–2027), the transformation plan is also to increase the share of revenue from retail trade, which currently stands at 2.7% to 13.6% in 2027. The plan envisages reduction of about 8% of the workforce, digitalization and improvement of the IT systems with the goal of getting rid of the long-standing technological debt related to both hardware and outdated digital systems. The transformation plan assumes, among others, the creation of the IT Shared Services Center and the introduction of modern solutions enabling the optimization and automation of processes.

In May 2024 Mikosz reaffirmed the company's commitment to the development of parcel machines. In the same year a new sorting center, one of the largest in Poland, was opened in Ciemne, Gmina Radzymin.

On January 1st, 2025 the Polish Post began operating a new e-Delivery (Polish: e-Doręczenia) service. To use the new service, one needs to set up a special mailbox via the mObywatel e-government website. People who do not use the Internet and do not have e-mail are able to go to the post office who will manage the mailbox of the person who does not have it, then print the letter and deliver it as will be sent electronically to Poczta Polska, being printed packed in an envelope and delivered by the postman in the traditional way.

== Museums ==
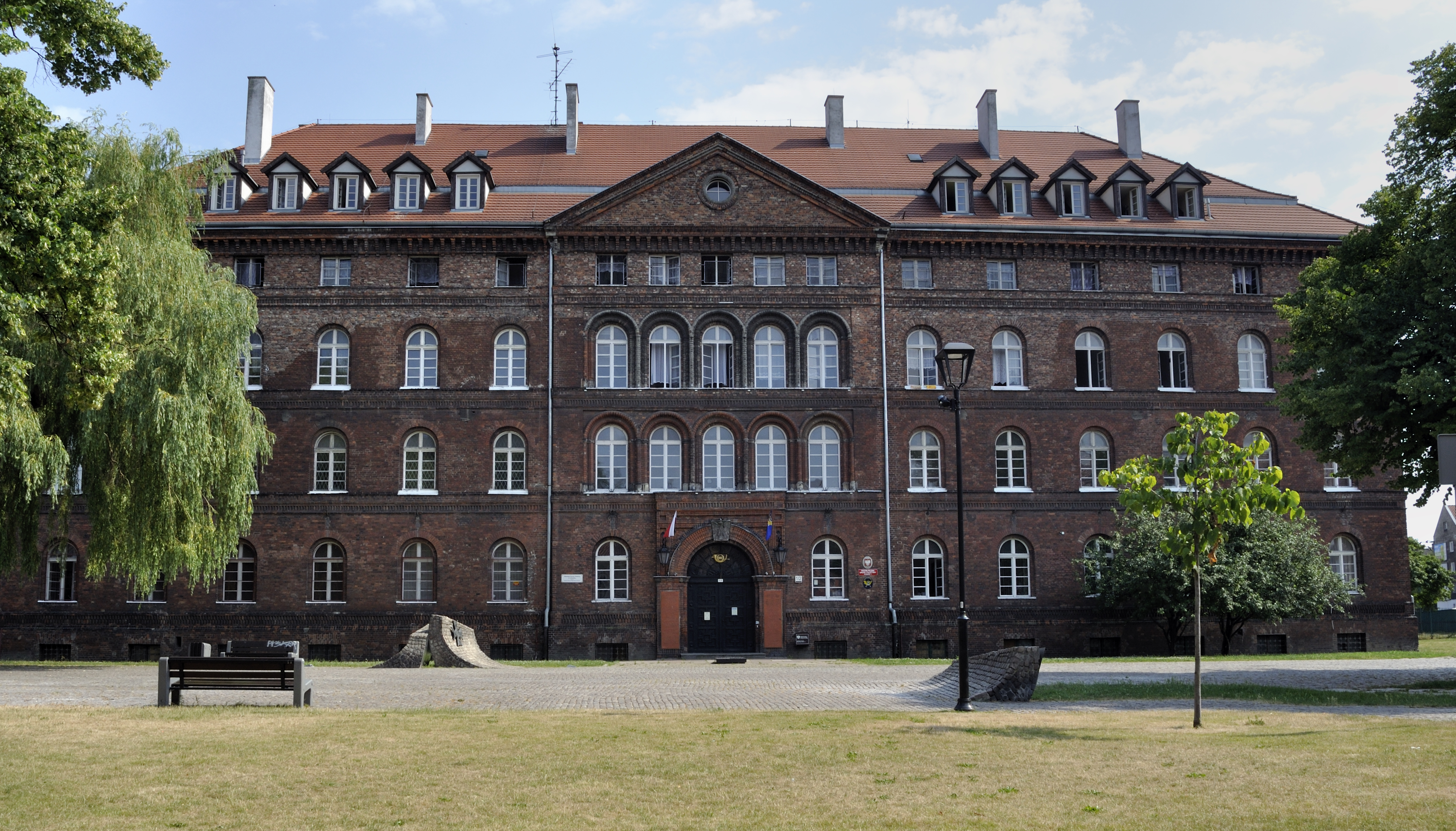
Museum of the Polish Post in Gdańsk

The following postal museums function:

- Post and Telecommunications Museum in Wrocław (Muzeum Poczty i Telekomunikacji)
- Branch of the Museum in Kościelec
- Museum of the Polish Post in Gdańsk (Muzeum Poczty Polskiej)

== Services ==
- letter mail
- electronic notice
- neo-stamp
- neo-letter
- Soccer Tickets Ekstraklasa
- money express
- postal order
- non-addressed printed forms
- advertising mail
- postal parcels
- order paid on delivery
- Pocztex – courier delivery
- cash logistics
- payments into bank accounts of social security contributions and to the tax authority account
- broadcasting receiving licence
- philately subscription
- newspaper subscriptions
- postal telegram (only incoming from overseas)

== Functioning of the Polish Post at the postal market ==
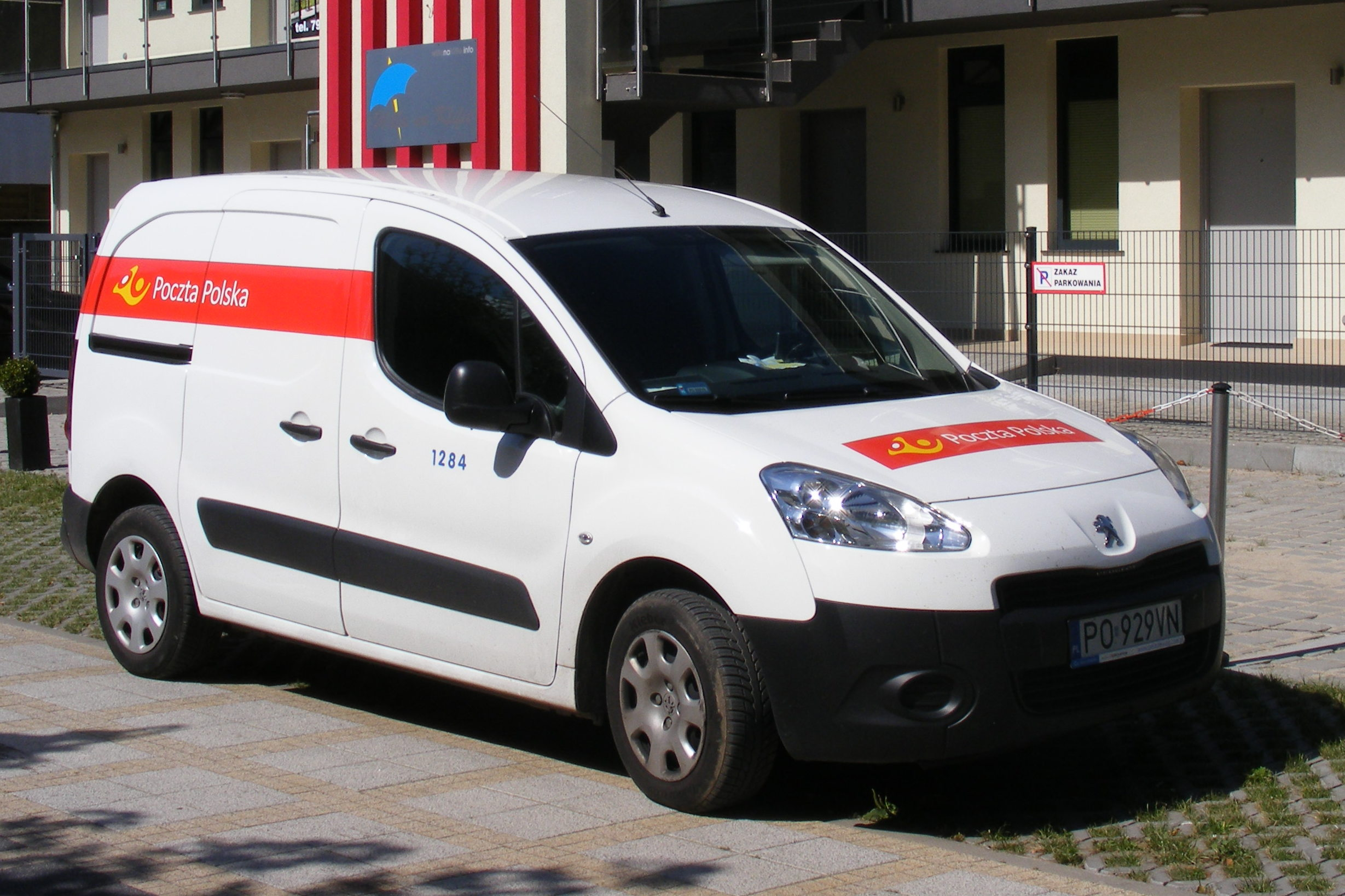
Small city vehicle (pictured is Peugeot Partner) used by Polish Post in local suburbs of cities and towns

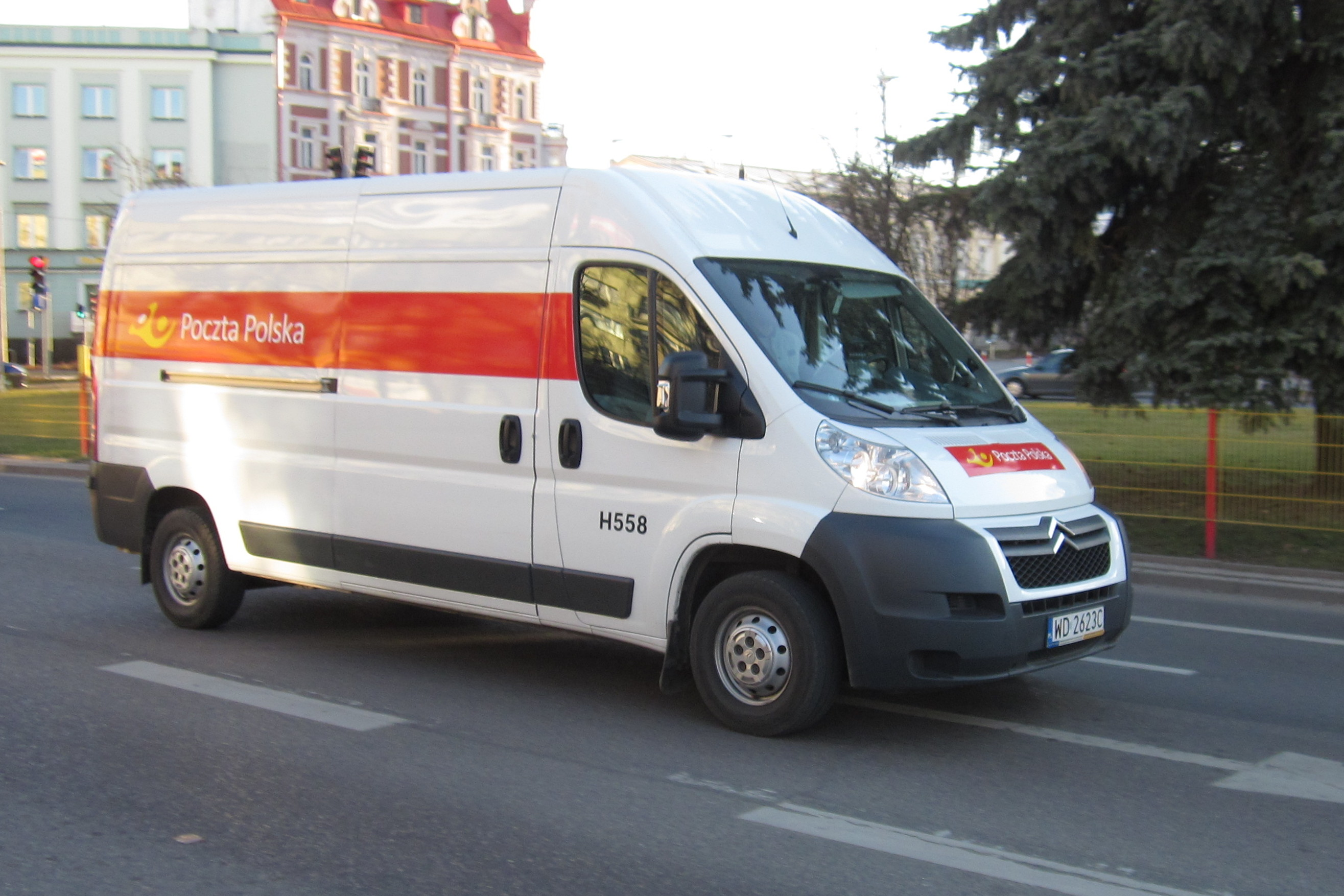
Citroën Jumper used by Polish Post in urban areas

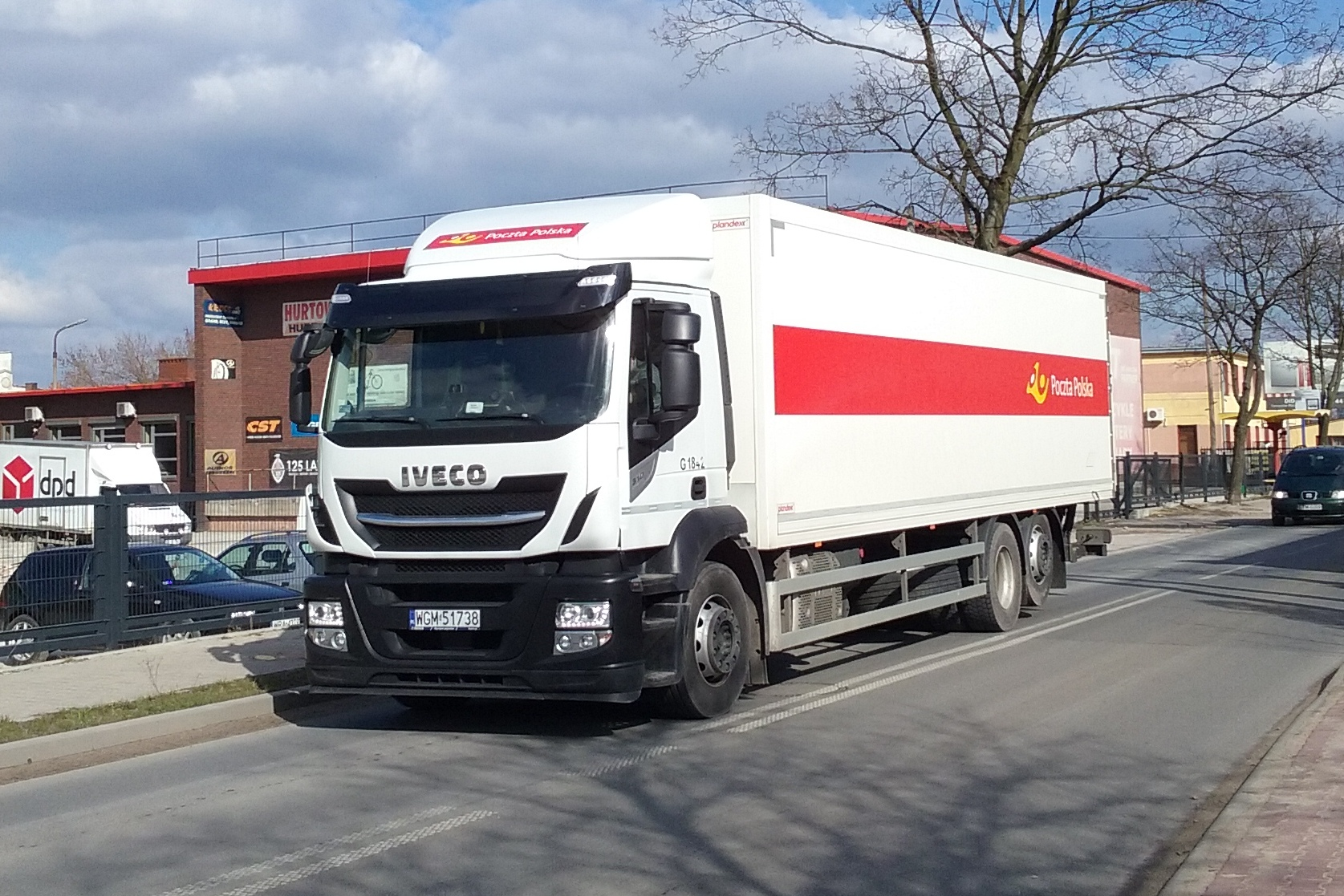
Long-distance vehicle used by Polish Post

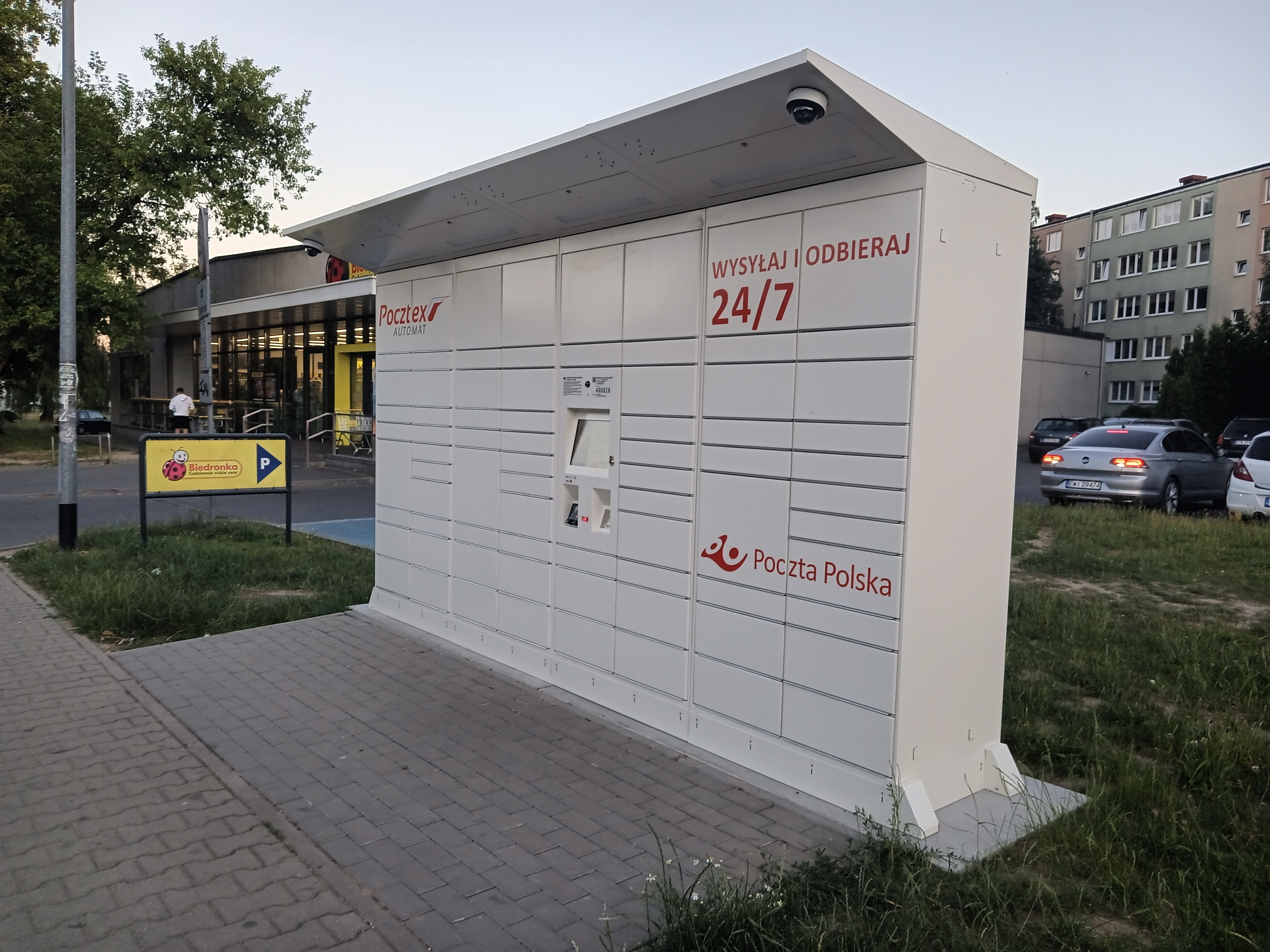
Parcel locker of Polish Post

In 2009 the Polish Post recorded losses of 190 million PLN, in 2008 – 215 million PLN. According to the management board of the Polish Post, the popularisation of electronic invoices may bring Polish Post losses in the amount of 170–200 million PLN. In September 2010 the Polish Post jointly with the Ministry of Justice, one of its most important clients, launched the pilot project consisting in electronic confirmation of the receipt of registered mail. At present, the Polish Post has been consistently implementing changes, thanks to which even on negative trends at the traditional postal market, the majority of financial parameters improved. This was achieved despite lower revenue than in 2010. Polish Post gross financial result in 2011 increased with 154% in comparison with 2010 and reached 159 million PLN. Gross turnover profitability of the Polish Post in 2011 amounted to 2.5 proc. This reflects the increase of 1.5 percentage point in comparison with the 2010. In 2009 this indicator was negative and amounted to (-) 2.3 proc.

In 2012 the control of the Supreme Chamber of Control (NIK) indicated that the organization of work of postal facilities is not adjusted to the needs of consumers using its services. The Post Office to an insufficient extent implemented restructuring strategic and the total amount spent on it reached 8 million PLN, and the results of implementation were not verified – whole management board relied on reporting assurances from regional branches, therefore many reforms are of illusory nature. The Post Office also spent 13 million PLN on information system, which did not work.

The Supreme Chamber of Control emphasized, however, that since 2010 the Company undertook restructuring measures, which allowed creating the profit for 2011 in the amount of 105.8 million PLN. In July 2011 a new Board was appointed; its main task is the development of the company and the implementation of key restructuring initiatives. The Polish Post plans to carry out the change of the image and organization of work of its facilities, in order to change them into places friendly for customers, offering the unproblematic sale of postal and financial services. New Management Board of the Company puts the emphasis on the development of parcel and courier services as well as offers of the so-called e-services, combining traditional forms of communication with the use of modern technologies.

Gross financial result of the Group in 2012 amounted to 163 million PLN, whereas from the comparable perspective, which takes into account pension contribution with 2 percentage points, is closer to 230 million PLN, which means the increase with 7% compared to 2011. Net ROE indicator for the Group reached 8.8% and is almost 100% higher than the result from 2010. At the same time, the Polish Post reduces costs – in comparison with the previous year there was a reduction of costs to more than 170 million PLN. In 2012 total development investments and investments in staff in the Polish Post amounted to more than 150 million PLN. Further details are given in the annual report of the company for 2012.

The Polish Post wants to allocated more than 1.3 billion PLN until 2017 for financing of the investment plan, including capital investments in strategic areas. Up to 85% of capital expenditures will be financed from the company's own resources. The company opts for the development of the parcel market, modern banking and insurance services, logistics, and digital communication. After 9 months in 2013 the volume of services provided by the Polish Post are 12% higher in comparison with the corresponding period in 2012; the volume of domestic courier services was higher with almost 60 proc. than in the previous year.

In October 2013, the Polish Post launched a new tool, thanks to which the clients can buy and print from the Internet the postal stamps or send letters and postcards, which will be delivered in the paper form by the postman. This is possible thanks to the Internet platform operating under the brand name Envelo. It is a solution that enables the use of postal services at any place and time. It is an element of building of the post office 3.0. The Polish Post Digital Services (pol. Poczta Polska Usługi Cyfrowe) company is responsible for the implementation.

In 2013, the Polish Post Group managed to improved its financial results (compared to previous year, with the exclusion of human capital development investments) despite lower by 3.4% revenue, which exceeded 6.5 billion PLN. Lower revenue was compensated by cost reductions, which in 2013 fell by 4% to 6.3 billion PLN. In accounting terms the costs were lower by 2.5% and reached 6.4 billion zł. Comparable gross profit of the Group in 2013 amounted to nearly 200 million PLN, with less than 160 million PLN in previous year. Book gross profit of the Polish Post Group reached in 2013 94 million PLN.

In 2013, Polish Post earmarked 250 million PLN for development investments (compared to 190 million in the years 2011 to 2012), including modernization of logistics (car fleet development) and sales network, as well as development of information technology and capital investment. In subsequent years, Polish Post plans further increase in investment spending. Polish Post managed to reduce Group's operating costs by more than 160 million PLN. Investments in human capital in 2013 amounted to 217 million PLN, over 100 million PLN more than in 2012. Year 2013 was, despite adverse market trends, the fourth consecutive year in which Polish Post reported positive financial result.

== Competition ==
The Polish Post for years has been systematically losing the monopoly for various types of consignments. Until the end of 2012 it availed from the legal benefit of having the reserved area, which gave it the exclusive rights to provide services, receive and deliver parcels weighing up to 50 g. At the same time, until the 24 September 2008 the owners and administrators of buildings had the responsibility to replace letter boxes, which are owned by the Polish Post, with European letter boxes available for all postal operators. In 2012 the works concerning the amendment of the Postal Law Act were completed and after the liquidation of the formal monopoly the actual monopoly, e.g. in case of official mail is declining in favor of competitors like InPost.

=== Other postal operators ===
- InPost sp. z o.o.
- EasyPost S.A.
- PGP Polska Grupa Pocztowa S.A.

=== Gallery ===
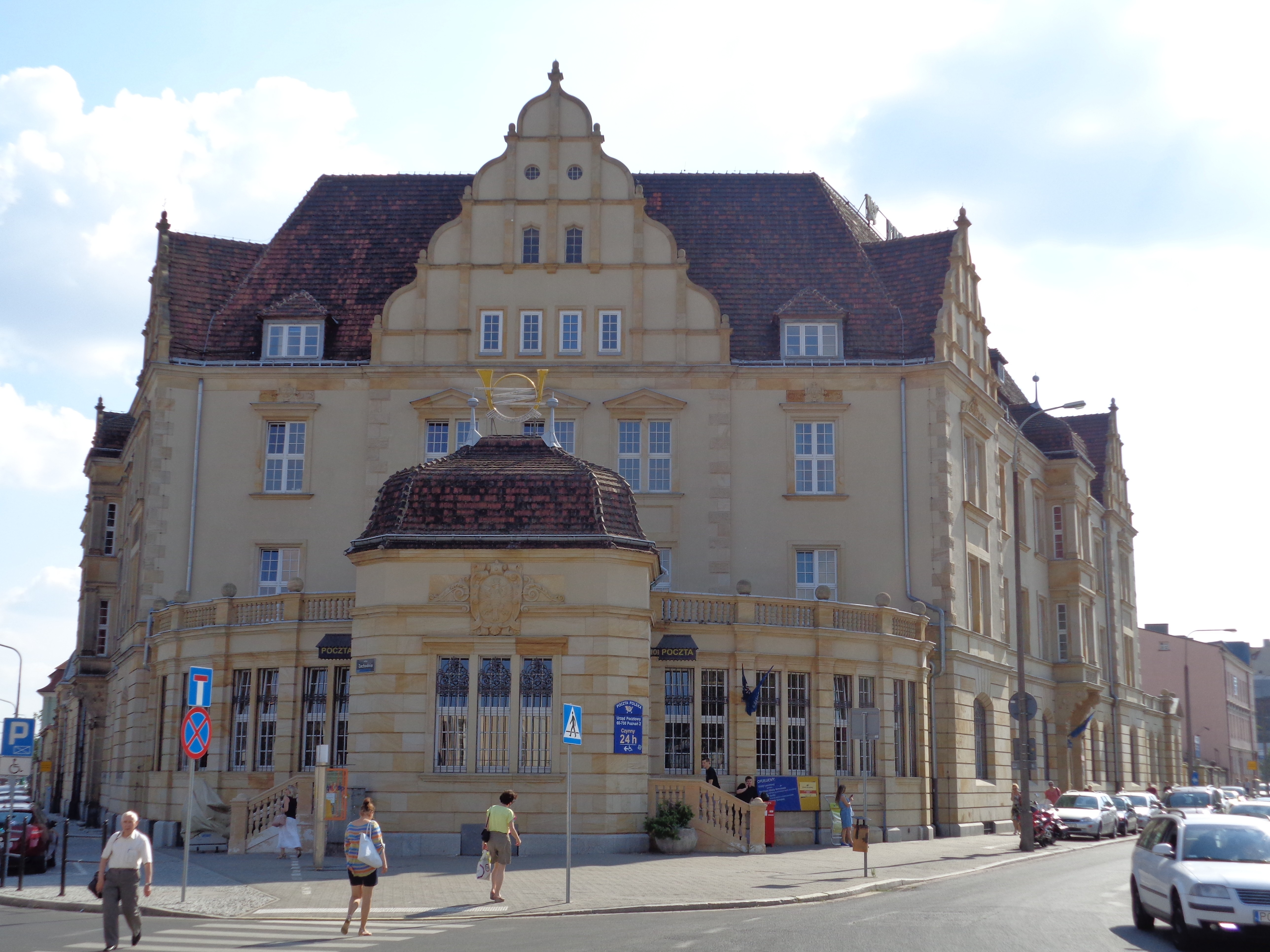
Post office at 17 Głogowska Street in Poznań

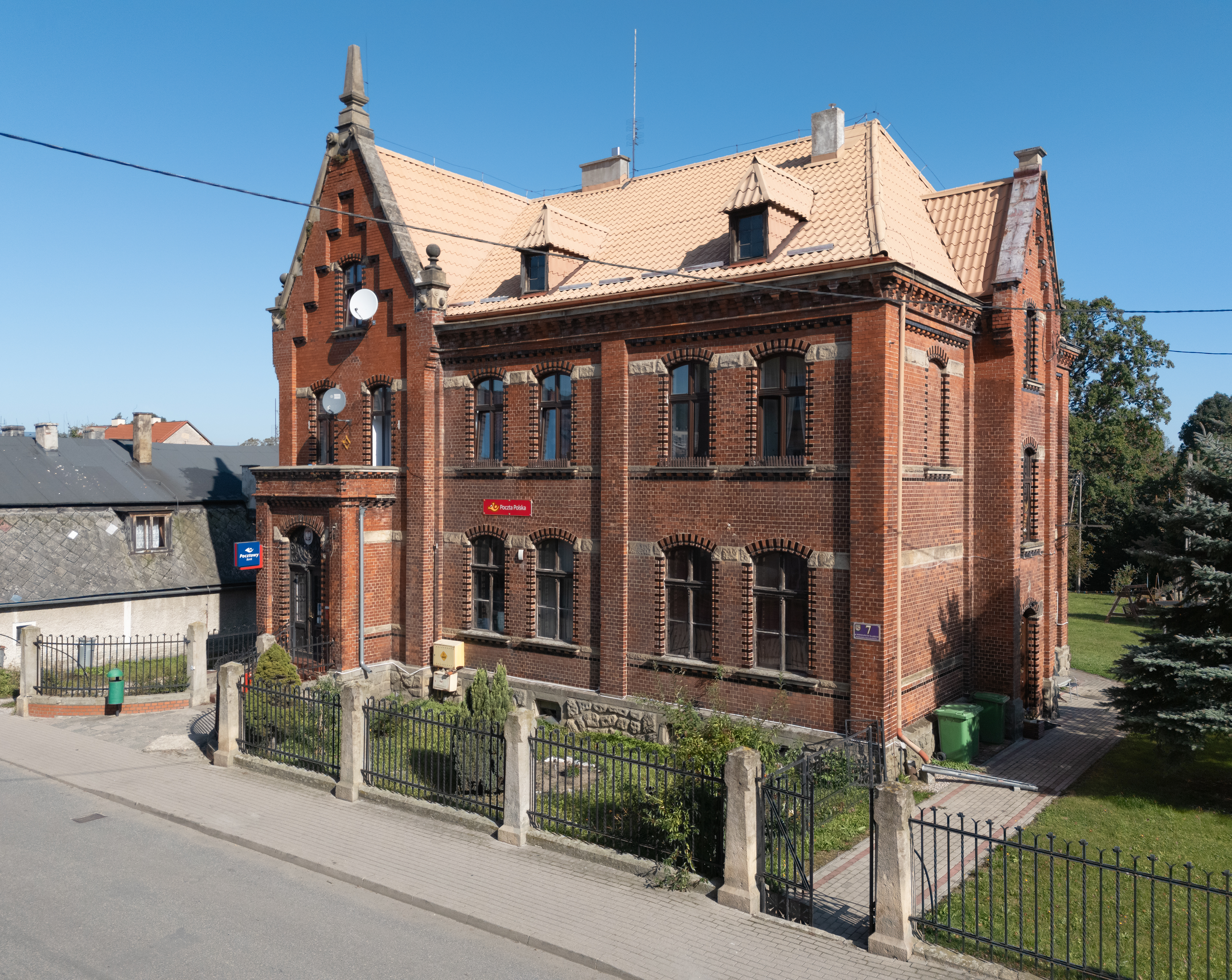
Post office in Międzylesie

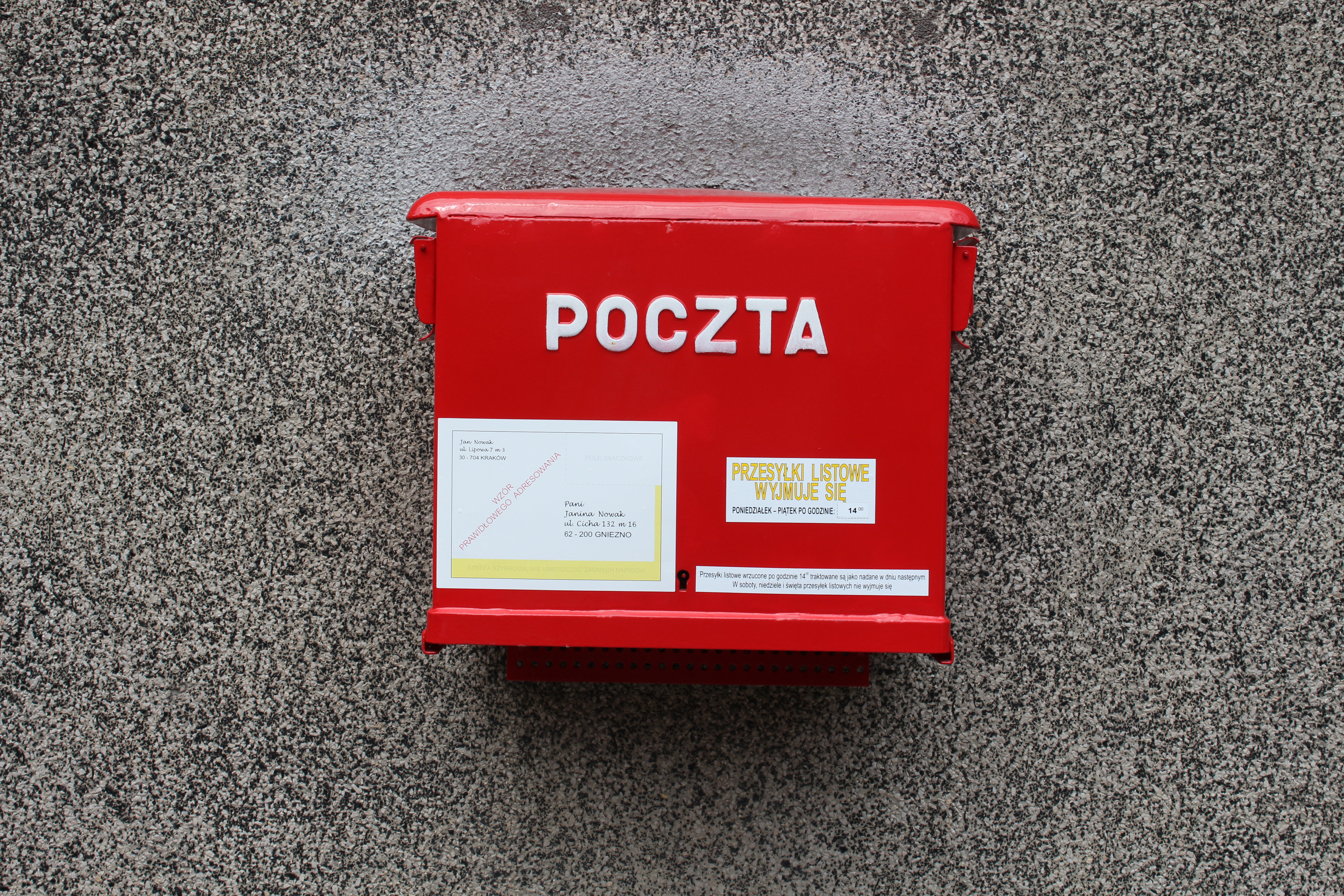
Typical Polish mailbox

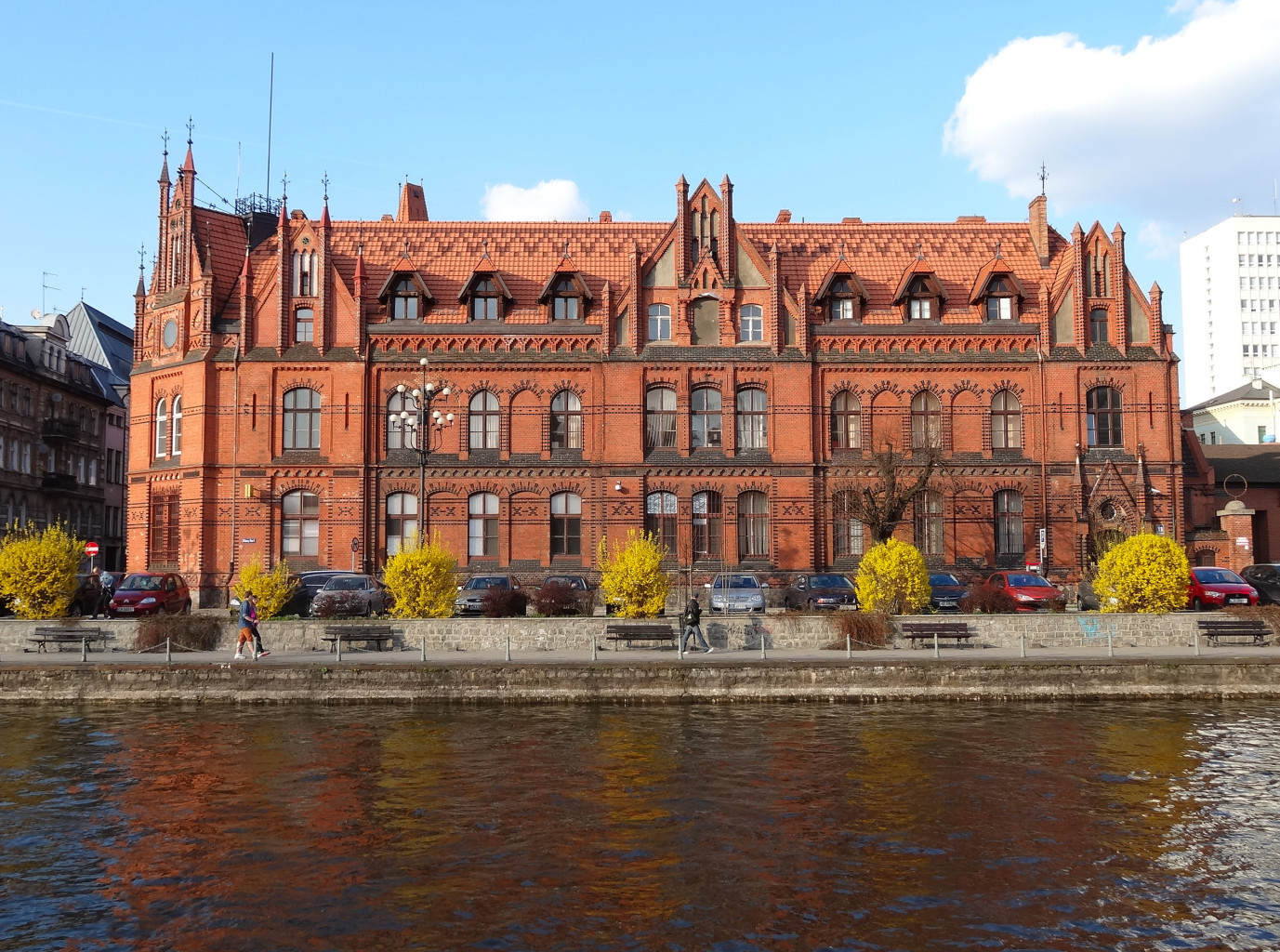
Post office of Bydgoszcz

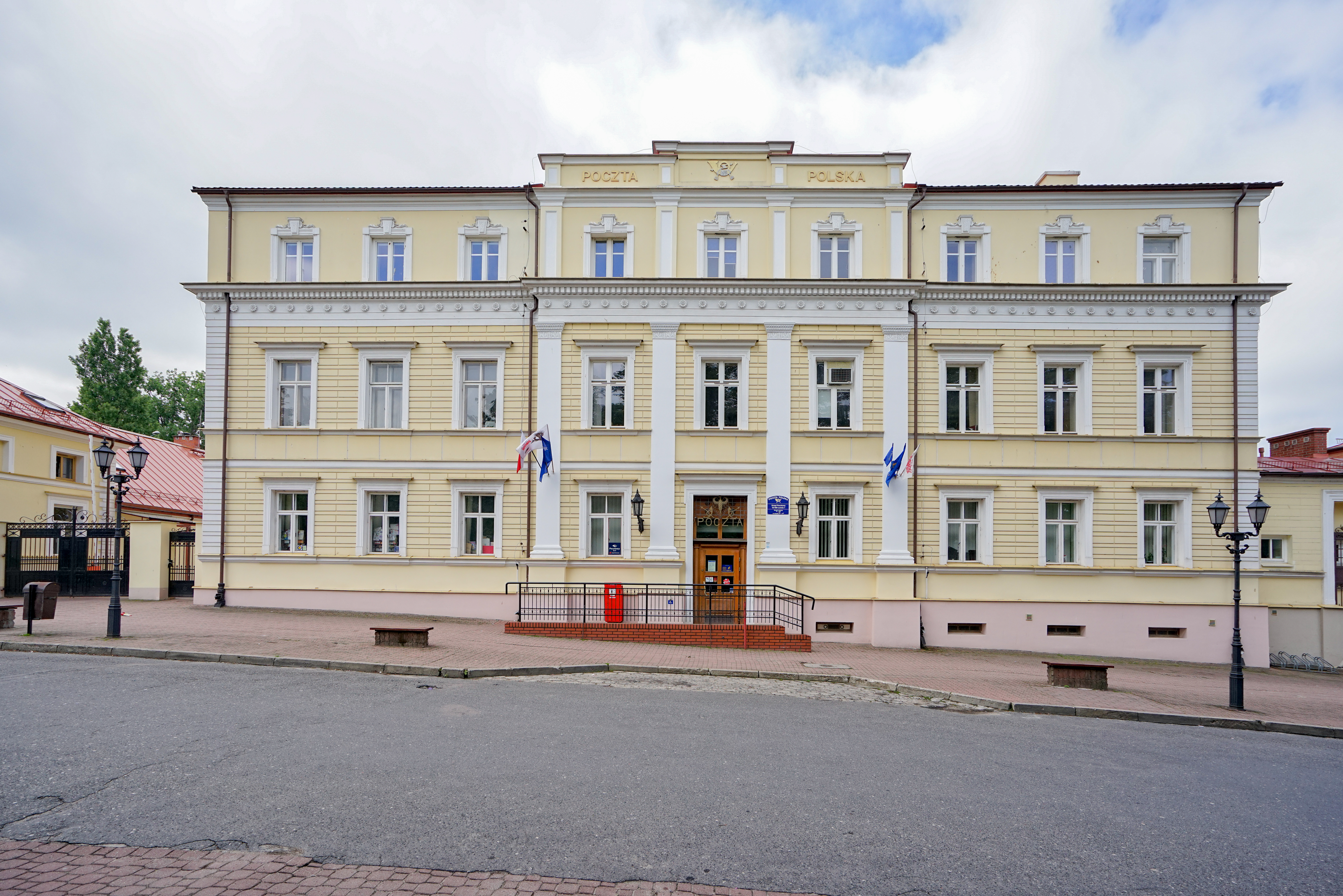
Main post office building in Łomża

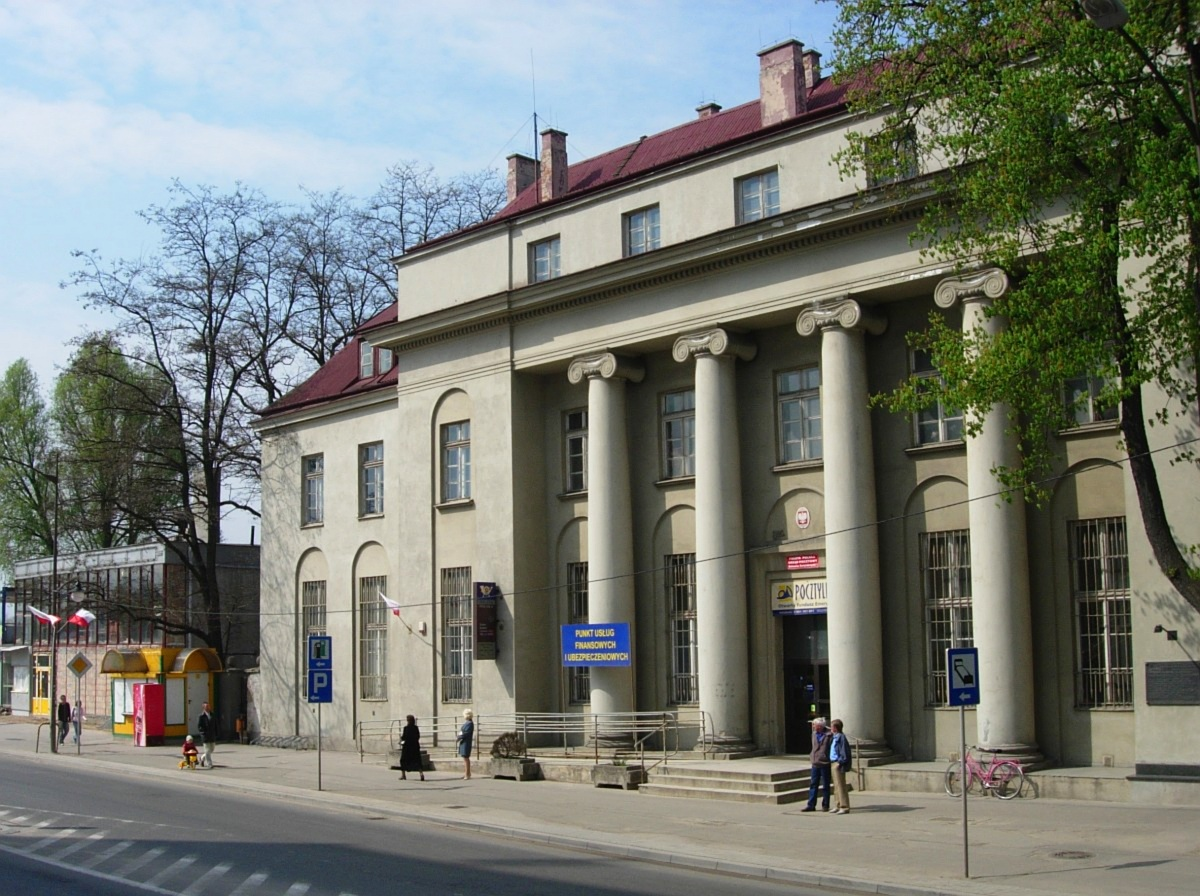
Main post office building in Ostrowiec Świętokrzyski

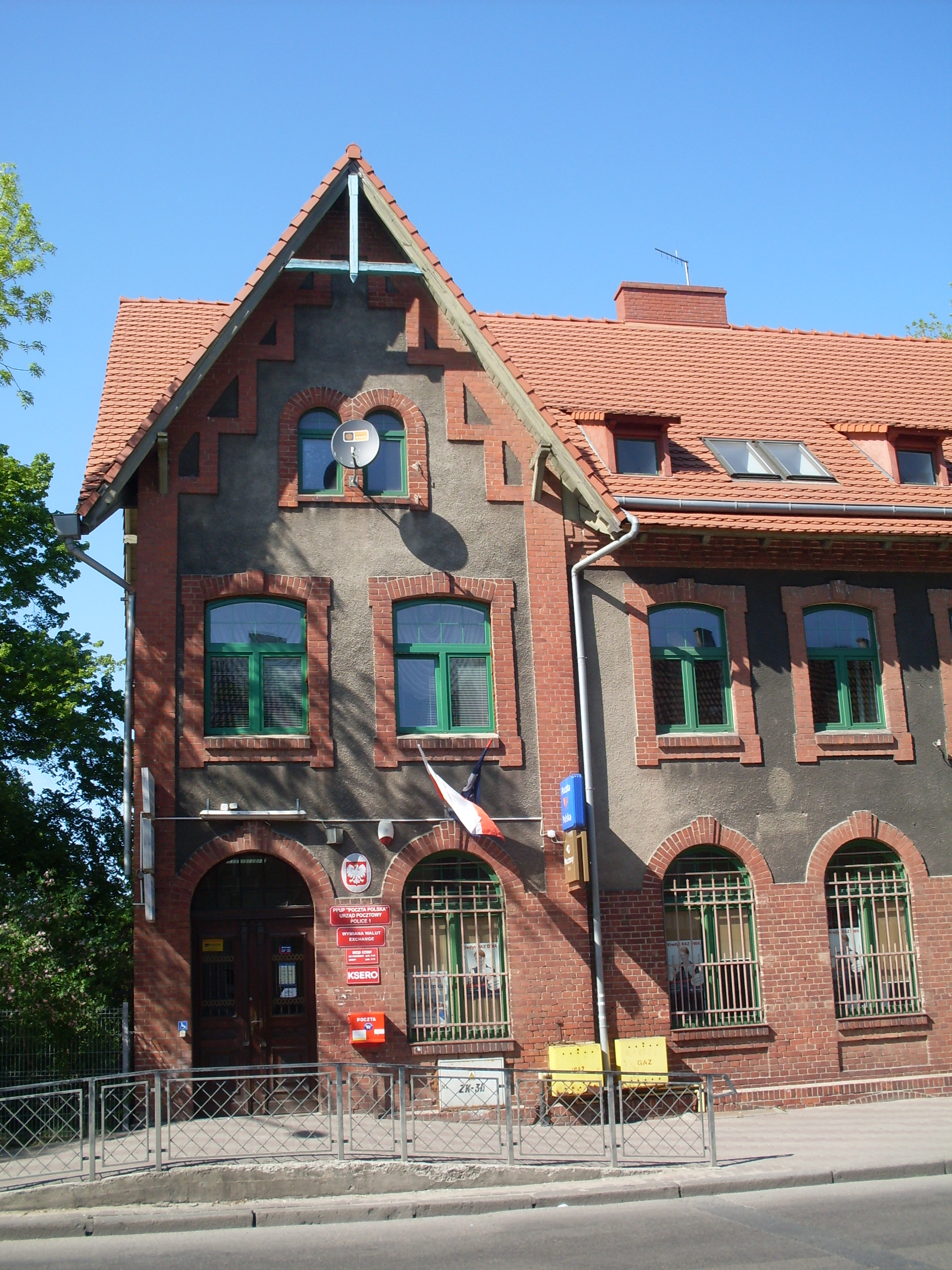
Post office in Police, Poland

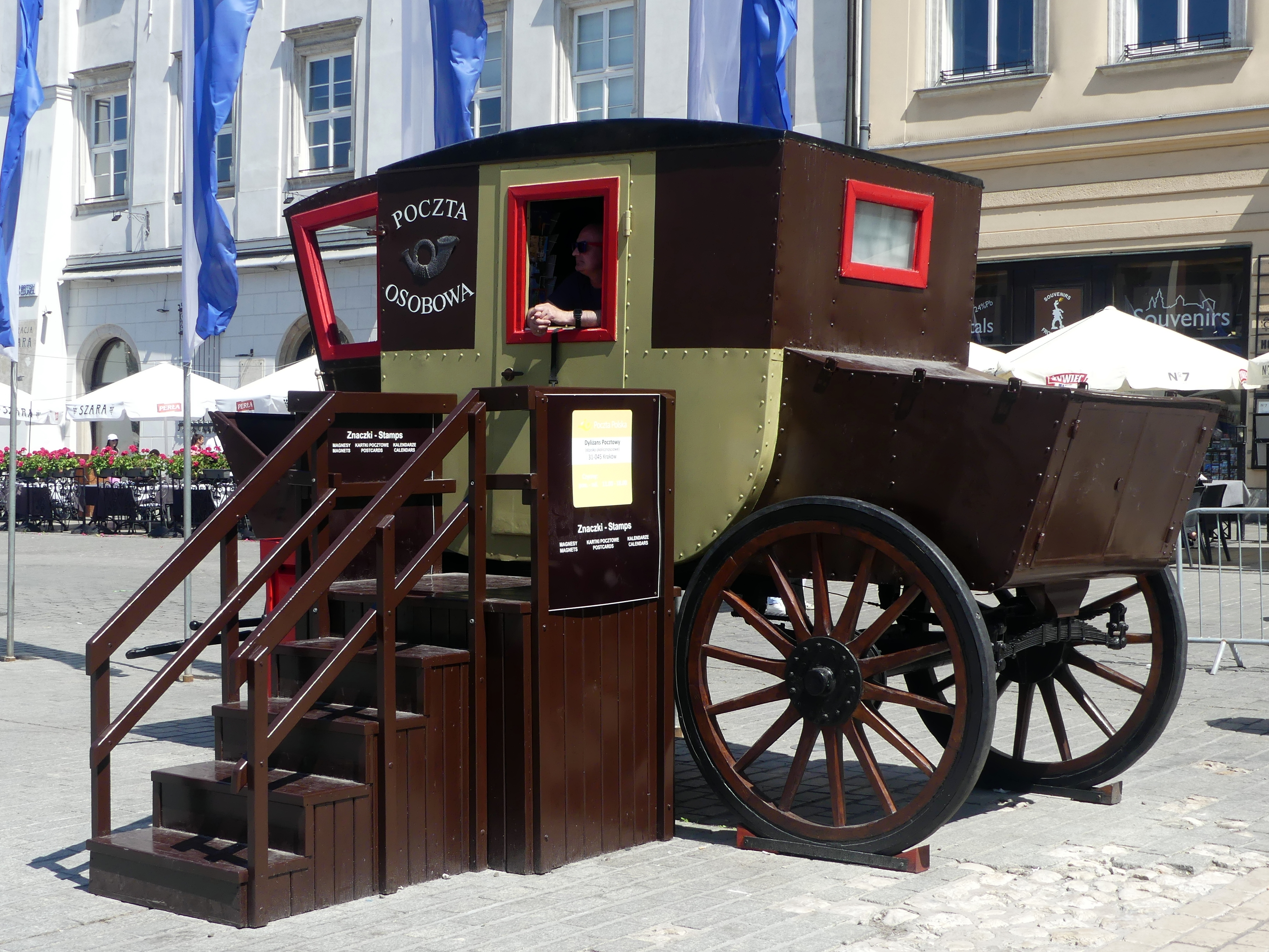
Dyliżans pocztowy

== See also ==
- List of national postal services#Europe
