= Jacek Prześluga =

Jacek Prześluga is a former General Director and a chairman of PKP Intercity S.A. He held this position for more than a year and left the job.

== See also ==
- Rynek Kolejowy

Preceded by Andrzej Żurkowski	PKP Intercity CEO since 2004–2006	Succeeded by Czesław Warsewicz
