= Rynek Kolejowy =

Polish magazine on rail transport

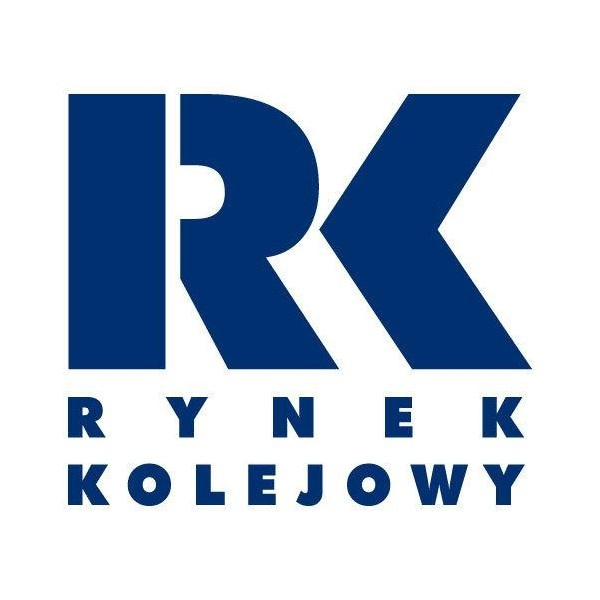

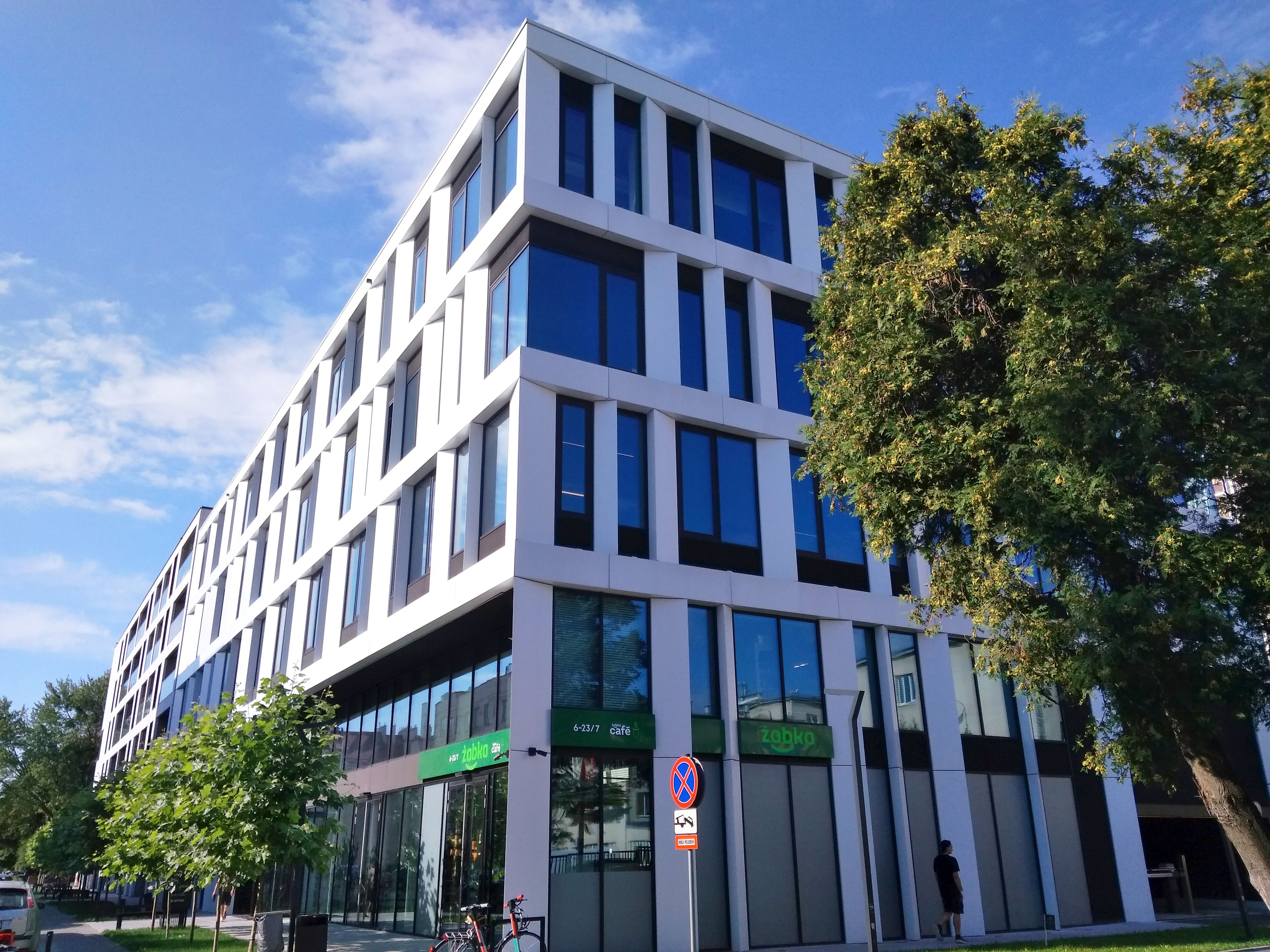
- Editorial office in Warsaw, Poland
- Editor: Łukasz Malinowski
- Former editors: Piotr Faryna (2002–2009)
- Categories: Rail transport in Poland
- Frequency: Monthly
- First issue: 2002
- Company: Zespół Doradców Gospodarczych TOR
- Country: Poland
- Based in: Warsaw, Poland
- Language: Polish
- Website: www.rynek-kolejowy.pl
- ISSN: 1644-1958

Rynek Kolejowy is a Polish magazine on the subject of rail transport, primarily in Poland. It is published monthly by Zespół Doradców Gospodarczych TOR.

== Overview ==
The monthly is published by the magazine's subsidiary, Zespół Doradców Gospodarczych TOR. Rynek Kolejowy features reports, opinions, event roundups, analyses, commentary, feature articles, and columns covering rail transport in Poland in the broadest sense. Regular contributors include Tadeusz Syryjczyk, a former Minister of Industry and later Minister of Transportation and Maritime Economy; past columnists have included Jacek Prześluga, a former president of PKP Intercity and board member of Polish State Railways and Wojciech Paprocki, as well as Franciszek Wielądek, a former Minister of Transportation and Maritime Economy, who wrote for the publication between 2002–2010.

According to the magazine, its readership primarily consists of parliamentarians, government officials, local government representatives, members of industry organisations and associations, and specialised administrative staff, as well as senior and middle managers from companies supplying products and services to the railway, tram, and rapid transit sectors.

Rynek Kolejowy has a website which is updated daily, mainly on rail transport in Poland.

== Awards and distinctions ==
- In 2020, Rynek Kolejowy was recognised as the best monthly magazine in a ranking published by Press. The jury commended the quality and timeliness of the published articles as well as the journalists' dedication. They highlighted the editorial team's responsiveness and the high substantive quality of the content, which sets the tone for discussions on rail transport in Poland.
- In September 2021, Jakub Madrjas, the Deputy editor-in-chief of Rynek Kolejowy, received a distinction in the Jan Raczyński Award competition, which honours journalists covering rail transport.
