= Employers of Poland =

Employers of Poland (known as "The Confederation of Polish Employers" from 1989 to 2010) is the oldest and the largest organisation of employers in Poland, associating 19 000 companies with over 5 million employees.

Employers of Poland represents both individual companies and regional or sectoral organisations. The main goal of the organization is to help create an employer- and business-friendly state and legal environment. Employers of Poland cooperate with social partners – trade unions – in order to ensure economic growth, just and stable employment conditions and occupational safety. Since September 9, 2015, this goal has been pursued in the Social Dialog Council, a successor of the Tripartite Committee.

Employers of Poland cooperate with institutional partners all over the world and are represented in a number of international organizations, working to create favourable conditions for Polish entrepreneurs both domestically and internationally. Employers of Poland are a member of the following international organizations: European Economic and Social Committee, International Organization of Employers, B20 Group (as the only Polish employers' organization), International Labour Organization, Business at OECD, International Coordinating Council of Employers' Organization, European Agency for Health and Safety at Work and the European Foundation for the Improvement of Living and Working Conditions (Eurofound).
