= Recognition of same-sex unions in Poland =

Poland recognizes same-sex marriage conducted within other member states of the European Union (EU), following a 2026 ruling by the Supreme Administrative Court. Poland has been the subject of several rulings by the European Court of Human Rights (ECHR) and the European Court of Justice (ECJ) regarding violations of the rights of same-sex couples. In December 2023, the ECHR ruled in Przybyszewska and Others v Poland that the government had violated Article 8 of the European Convention on Human Rights by failing to recognize same-sex unions, and imposed a positive obligation on the government to introduce a legal framework for partnership recognition. In a subsequent case concerning marriage, the ECJ ruled in Jakub Cupriak-Trojan and Mateusz Trojan v Wojewoda Mazowiecki that Poland had violated the rights of same-sex couples by refusing to recognise marriages contracted abroad, expanding on an earlier ruling from June 2018 that the same-sex spouses of European Union citizens should be granted a right of residency in Poland. In March 2026, the Supreme Administrative Court confirmed that same-sex marriages contracted in other EU member states must be recognized domestically for administrative and residency purposes, ordering local civil registry offices to transcribe non-Polish EU same-sex marriage certificates into the Polish system. In May, the Mayor of Warsaw, Rafał Trzaskowski, announced that the city would begin transcribing same-sex marriage certificates into its registry, despite the absence of legislation at the national level. Subsequently, the government announced its intention to comply with EU law, with regulations allowing foreign marriage licenses to be transcribed taking effect on 23 August.

Previously, in 2012, the Supreme Court ruled that same-sex couples have limited legal rights with regard to the tenancy of a shared household. A few laws also guarantee certain limited rights to same-sex couples, notably the right to refuse to testify against the partner and some social benefits. However, Article 18 of the Polish Constitution, adopted in 1997, is frequently interpreted as banning same-sex marriage, but in 2022 a court ruled that it does not explicitly preclude its recognition. A bill creating civil unions was introduced to the Parliament of Poland in October 2024, and passed the Sejm by a 230–198 vote on 29 May 2026. However, it was vetoed by President Karol Nawrocki on 17 July. Polling suggests that a majority of Polish people support the legal recognition of registered partnerships and same-sex marriage.

== Limited legal rights ==
=== Background ===
Historical research has shown that during the time of the Second Polish Republic some couples established "marriage contracts" and lived together in joint households. A known partnership involved Marian Kuleszyński and Stefan Góralski, both residents of the Suwałki Region in the early 1920s. While their relationship lacked formal legal status and was kept confidential, the pair entered into a de facto agreement grounded in fidelity, an expectation of enduring commitment, and a "friendship for life oath". This oath comprised stipulations for mutual defense, support, and the safeguarding of the relationship's confidentiality.

In 2004, the Public Transport Authority of Warsaw announced it would allow the cohabiting partners of gay and lesbian employees to travel free on the city's public transport system, marking the first case of recognition of same-sex relationships in Poland. In 2007, the City Center of Social Assistance of Chorzów said it would recognize persons cohabiting in the same household as a family for purposes associated with the center. In 2011, Polish writer Izabela Filipiak successfully obtained a residency card for her female American partner. In addition, a lesbian couple was granted the right to register her and her partner's name on the birth certificate of their British-born son in 2018.

=== Statutory laws ===
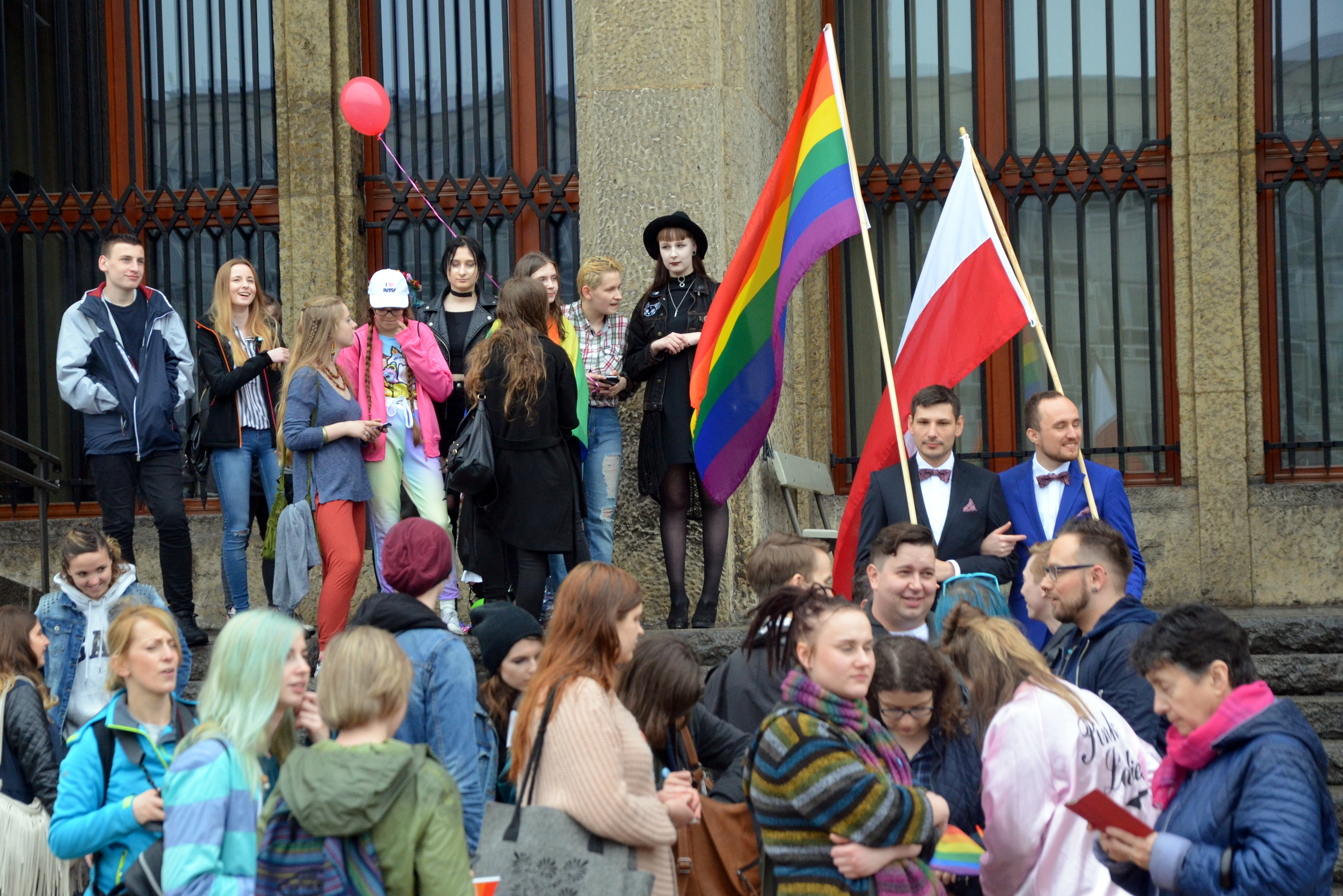
A same-sex couple (right) at the Kraków Equality March in 2017

While Poland does not have a specific law on cohabitation, there are some provisions in various legal acts that recognise relations between unmarried partners and grant specific rights and obligations. For example, article 115(11) of the Penal Code uses the term "closest person" (Polish: osoba najbliższa), defined as "a spouse, an ascendant, descendant, brother or sister, relative by marriage in the same line or degree, a person in an adopted relation, as well as his or her spouse, and a domestic partner". The status of "closest person" provides the right to refuse to testify against the partner under article 182 of the Code of Criminal Procedure. However, the term "domestic partner" is not explicitly defined. In February 2016, the Supreme Court of Poland ruled 6–1 that the term "domestic partner" includes same-sex couples and as such that a person in a same-sex relationship may refuse to testify.

Other laws also provide limited recognition to same-sex couples. Since 2004, when one partner is entitled to social benefits, the income of the other partner is also taken into consideration. Under article 6.14 of the Social Aid Act of 12 March 2004, entitlement to social benefits is dependent on the income per person in a family. The term "family" is used in the act to refer to people who are married, in a de facto partnership, living together and have a common household. In addition, article 3.1(2) of the Patients' Rights Act of 6 November 2008 allows a person to be considered as "next of kin" for medical purposes if their partner suffers an accident or is seriously ill. The definition of "next of kin" includes a "person in a durable partnership" (osoba w trwałym pożyciu).

=== Court cases ===
On 23 February 2007, the Białystok Regional Court adjudicated a financial dispute over the division of assets between two same-sex partners following the end of their relationship. It held that "cohabitation (konkubinat) should be understood as a stable, de facto personal and material community of two people. Gender is irrelevant in this context. [...] There are no grounds for applying different rules to the settlement of homosexual cohabitation from those applicable to heterosexual cohabitation." The Supreme Court upheld the lower court ruling on 6 December 2007, holding that "the constitutional protection of marriage does not mean that forms of cohabitation other than marriage are prohibited by law. There is also no doubt that property settlements between persons in non-marital unions are permissible and that such persons may claim protection with regard to property relations arising during the existence of such a union."

With regard to housing benefits, the Gliwice Regional Administrative Court ruled on 10 January 2008 that "within the meaning of section 4 of the Act of 21 June 2001 on housing benefits, the circle of persons permanently residing in and running a household with a person applying for a housing allowance... may include persons regardless of the family relationship between them and the applicant, including persons in a de facto relationship with the applicant, regardless of their sex". In 2010, a court in Złotów ruled that the same-sex partner of a woman who had died was entitled to continue the lease on their communal apartment. The municipality appealed the verdict, but an appellate court in Poznań rejected the appeal. "The court found that these women actually remained in a stable partnership. Any other interpretation would lead to discrimination based on sexual orientation," said Judge Adam Jutrzenka-Trzebiatowski. On 21 October 2015, the Łódź Regional Administrative Court dismissed an application by a woman to have her family name changed to that of her same-sex partner.

On 28 November 2012, the Supreme Court ruled, in case III CZP 65/12, that the term "person living in cohabitation with the tenant" (osoba pozostająca we wspólnym pożyciu z najemcą) in article 691(1) of the Civil Code includes a person of the same sex. This case involved a gay man whose partner, the main tenant of their shared apartment, had died. The court interpreted the law in a way that recognised the surviving partner as authorised to take over the right to tenancy. Previously, in March 2010, the European Court of Human Rights had ruled in the case of Kozak v Poland that a person in a same-sex relationship has the right to inherit from their partner. With regard to tenancy rights, the Warsaw Court of Appeal ruled on 26 June 2014 that:

There are no convincing reasons in the case-law or any sociological or psychological arguments in favour of distinguishing on a legal basis between the effects resulting from heterosexual and homosexual cohabitation (konkubinat); on the contrary, the emotional, physical and economic bonds arising from such cohabitation are the same in both cases and can create an equally strong bond. [...] At present, the concept of cohabitation refers to the permanent common life of two persons, regardless of their sex. Constitutional considerations, that is, the guarantee of equal treatment established in Article 32 of the Constitution of the Republic of Poland and the corresponding prohibition of any discrimination on the grounds of, inter alia, sexual orientation, support the recognition that a refusal to provide insurance cover to same-sex persons who are cohabitating constitutes discrimination on grounds of sexual orientation.

== Registered partnerships ==
Laws regarding same-sex partnerships in Europe¹ Marriage Civil union Limited domestic recognition (cohabitation) Unrecognized Constitution limits marriage to opposite-sex couples ¹ May include recent laws or court decisions that have not yet entered into effect.

=== Summary ===
Registered partnerships (Polish: rejestrowany związek partnerski, pronounced [rɛ.jɛstrɔˈvanɨ ˈzvjɔ̃zɛk parˈtnɛrskʲi]) (Note: In some languages of Poland: Belarusian: грамадзянскае партнёрства, hramadzjánskaje partnjórstva; German: eingetragene Lebenspartnerschaft; Karaim: cywil ortakłych; Kashubian: cywilné partnerstwò; Lithuanian: registruota partnerystė; Romani: registrime partnerimo; Rusyn: горожанськоє цимборенє, gorožans'koje tsimborenje; Tatar: гражданлык партнерлыгы, grajdanlıq partnerlıgı; Wymysorys: łaowaspaortnerśoft) are not available in Poland, despite several previous unsuccessful attempts to change the law. The first bill to recognise registered partnerships was introduced in 2002. In 2023, the European Court of Human Rights imposed a positive obligation on the government to establish a legal framework recognizing same-sex unions. A bill successfully passed the Sejm in May 2026, but was vetoed by President Karol Nawrocki in July.

=== Early bills ===
The first legislative proposal to recognise registered partnerships was proposed in 2002, but did not advance. In November 2004, the Senate of Poland approved a bill allowing same-sex couples to register their relationships as civil unions. The civil unions proposed by the bill would have given couples a range of benefits, protections and responsibilities granted only to married opposite-sex couples, including pension funds and joint tax and death-related benefits, but excluding the right to adopt children. The bill was passed with 38 votes in favour, 23 against and 15 abstentions. However, it lapsed due to the 2005 general election. Only two parties, the Democratic Left Alliance – Labour Union and the Social Democracy of Poland, supported the bill, while Civic Platform (PO), the League of Polish Families and Law and Justice (PiS) opposed it. The Self-Defence of the Republic of Poland was neutral, and the Polish People's Party (PSL) did not take a position. A new registered partnership bill was proposed in late 2007, but was opposed by the government and rejected. In 2008, another bill was drafted by the opposition Democratic Left Alliance (SLD), but was eventually not introduced to the Parliament of Poland due to its low chances of success.

In June 2009, gay and lesbian organisations submitted a petition calling for the legalization of registered partnerships to the Speaker of the Sejm, Bronisław Komorowski. Some politicians from parties opposed to same-sex unions, including Jerzy Buzek (PO) and Michał Kamiński (PiS), had expressed support for certain rights being granted to same-sex couples. Attitudes from some representatives of the Catholic Church had also changed. In January 2010, the opposition SLD, in consultation with LGBT organisations, prepared a draft law on registered partnerships, modelled on the bill approved by the Senate in 2004 and similar to the French civil solidarity pact (PACS). However, the bill stood little chance of passing in Parliament as PO, PiS and PSL announced that they would not support it.

On 17 May 2011, the SLD presented a new draft partnership law, again modelled on the French PACS law. Agnieszka Pomaska, the Deputy Secretary-General of Civic Platform, commented that it was "time to discuss the legal regulation of informal relationships both opposite-sex and same-sex" and that her party was "open to discussing registered partnerships". Prime Minister Donald Tusk announced that the bill would "be passed at the beginning of the next term of the Sejm", but Speaker Grzegorz Schetyna said that a vote would not be put to Parliament during that legislative term. However, after receiving a petition in favour of the registered partnership bill signed by 23,500 people, Schetyna said that he would probably submit the bill for first reading in Parliament after 10 July 2011. Krzysztof Tyszkiewicz, a spokesman for the PO parliamentary group, announced that the party would support the SLD bill, but only after the parliamentary elections in October 2011. In July 2011, the Social and Family Policy Commission and the Justice and Human Rights Commission approved the bill by 29 votes to 10 with 3 abstentions. After the bill passed its first reading in the Sejm, the Supreme Court expressed its opinion on 9 October 2011. The court undermined any further progress on the bill, highlighting numerous legal deficiencies. It also stated that the registration of cohabiting opposite-sex couples was incompatible with Article 18 of the Polish Constitution. Regarding the relationships of same-sex couples, it stated that the admissibility and scope of any statutory regulation required an analysis taking into account international legal obligations, and considering the implications of recent judgments by the European Court of Human Rights. According to professor Miroslaw Wyrzykowski, the head of the Department of Human Rights at the University of Warsaw's Faculty of Law, and a former judge of the Constitutional Tribunal, the Constitution requires the introduction of registered partnerships. Eventually, the bill was never voted on by Parliament and therefore expired.

=== Developments in 2011–2018 ===
After the parliamentary elections in October 2011, Janusz Palikot, leader of the Palikot's Movement (RP), said that a bill on civil partnerships would be among the first draft laws his party submitted to Parliament. Leszek Miller, the head of the SLD parliamentary group, announced that the party would reintroduce the same bill as had been introduced in the previous parliaments. The vice president of the PO parliamentary group, Rafał Grupiński, said that its members would have a free vote on the draft law. Stanisław Żelichowski, the head of the PSL parliamentary group, said that he expected the bill to be ignored by Parliament. A new draft law based on the Scandinavian model (not the French PACS), applying to same-sex couples only, was scheduled to be drafted and submitted to Parliament by early December 2011 as a joint initiative of the SLD and the RP. Some members of the PO also declared their support. PSL did not state a clear position on the issue but was believed to be in support. Only PiS were opposed, though some of its members, such as Witold Waszczykowski, signalled their support.

MEP Agnieszka Kozłowska-Rajewicz described the adoption of the law on civil partnerships as one of her priorities, though she added that the ideal would be the introduction of same-sex marriage. She also said that civil partnerships similar to the French PACS were more popular at the time and that the law would be enacted in that parliamentary term. Separately, a government report, entitled "Poland 2030 Third wave of modernity – Long-term National Development Strategy", stated that an objective for the five-year period to 2015 would be the equalization of rights for unmarried couples. Artur Dunin commented that many PO parliamentarians saw the need for such a partnership law, provided that it "did not go too far". On 13 January 2012, the SLD and the RP jointly presented two draft laws on civil partnerships to the Sejm. The first bill was the same that had failed in the previous Sejm, similar to the French PACS law (for same-sex and opposite-sex couples), whereas the second bill was similar to the Scandinavian model (for same-sex couples only). The PO also intended to introduce its own bill, which would be similar to the French PACS law but include some additional differences between civil unions and marriages. On 28 June, a parliamentary committee expressed its opinion that both bills were unconstitutional. On 24 July, the Sejm voted against submitting the two bills for a first reading. One day later, the Civic Platform proposed its own bill, which was submitted to the Parliament in September. All three drafts were rejected on 25 January 2013 by the Sejm, with the most narrow defeat being for the bill proposed by Civic Platform, which lost 211–228.

Following the 2015 parliamentary elections, the socially conservative PiS, which opposed registered partnerships, formed the new government. A new registered partnership bill was proposed on 12 February 2018 by the Modern party. It was introduced to the Sejm in April 2018 but did not advance further.

=== Przybyszewska and Others ruling and passage of legislation in 2026 ===
In 2017, four same-sex couples filed a lawsuit challenging the laws that "made it impossible for two persons of the same sex to marry and did not at least provide for any other form of legal recognition of relationships between two persons of the same sex". A fifth couple joined the litigation in April 2018. Their attempts to be issued marriage licenses were previously rejected on the basis that the Constitution and the Family and Custody Code of Poland define marriage as "a union between a woman and a man". The couples appealed to the courts, but the decisions of the authorities were upheld. The case was eventually appealed to the European Court of Human Rights (ECHR). In July 2020, the court invited the Polish Government to present its position on the issue. Based on the precedents of Oliari and Others v Italy, in which the ECHR found that "the absence of a legal framework allowing for recognition and protection of [applicants'] relationship violates their rights under Article 8", and Orlandi and Others v Italy, in which the ECHR ruled that Italy must recognize same-sex marriages performed in other jurisdictions, advocates hoped that the case would lead to the legal recognition of same-sex relationships in Poland. The ECHR issued its judgement in the case of Przybyszewska and Others v Poland on 12 December 2023, ruling that the government had violated the European Convention on Human Rights, specifically Article 8, which protects the right to private and family life, by failing to recognise same-sex unions. The court had already issued similar rulings with respect to Romania in Buhuceanu and Others, Russia in Fedotova and Others, Bulgaria in Koilova and Babulkova, and Ukraine in Maymulakhin and Markiv. It imposed a positive obligation on the government to introduce a framework recognising same-sex partnerships.

On 27 December 2023, Prime Minister Donald Tusk announced that a bill to legalise same-sex unions would be introduced and debated in the Sejm in early 2024, in line with a pledge made during his campaign for the 2023 election. The bill was added to the government agenda on 8 July 2024 and presented publicly by Minister of Equality Katarzyna Kotula in October 2024. It would allow both opposite-sex and same-sex couples to form registered partnerships, affording rights in the areas of inheritance, property, taxation and support, but excluding adoption rights. Civic Platform and The Left have vowed to pass the bill. In October, the Archbishop of Warsaw, Kazimierz Nycz, expressed his support for civil partnerships and said "that the Church [would] not interfere in the legislative process". A public consultation process was open until 15 November 2024. In March 2025, Marshal of the Senate Małgorzata Kidawa-Błońska said the bill was unlikely to pass before the May presidential elections. The election was won by Karol Nawrocki who opposes same-sex registered partnerships. In June 2025, Minister Kotula introduced the partnership bill to the Sejm. In July, Kotula said she was open to compromising with the more conservative factions of the government and Nawrocki to get the bill passed, and suggested changing the name of the union from "civil partnership" to "partnership agreement". An Ipsos poll conducted the previous month showed that 62% of Poles supported recognizing same-sex unions.

Following concessions, the bill was amended to allow two adults to sign a notarized agreement granting them limited cohabitation rights as the "closest person in a relationship" (osoby najbliższej w związku), including shared property arrangements, maintenance obligations, joint property and tax settlements, and access to their partner's medical information. Kotula said, "It's not a proposal of our dreams, it's a proposal of the coalition reality and with Karol Nawrocki as president." Activists described the bill as "disappointing" as it proposed "a civil partnership status that falls well short of marriage", while Nawrocki threatened to veto the legislation if passed. The bill passed its first reading in the Sejm on 13 February 2026. In April, over 100 organisations, including Amnesty International and the Helsinki Foundation for Human Rights, urged the government to swiftly pass the bill. The Sejm passed the legislation in final reading on 29 May by a 230–198 vote. Kotula welcomed the vote, calling the bill "the first law in [Poland's] history that gives the possibility of recognizing same-sex unions". On 27 May, Paweł Szefernaker stated that "[t]here is not and will not be consent from the president for the introduction or legalisation of civil partnerships". Speaking ahead of the Sejm vote, Nawrocki confirmed this stance, stating: "I am the guardian of the Constitution that states explicitly that marriage is a union between a man and a woman." However, he added that he would be willing to sign limited cohabitation rights, provided they do not mirror the legal framework of civil partnerships. The legislation passed the Senate 55–29 on 25 June. President Nawrocki vetoed the bill as promised on 17 July.

29 May 2026 vote in the Sejm
Party	Voted for	Voted against	Abstained	Absent (Did not vote)
Law and Justice	–	175: Andrzej Adamczyk; Waldemar Andzel; Dorota Arciszewska-Mielewczyk; Iwona Arent; Marek Ast; Piotr Babinetz; Anna Baluch; Ryszard Bartosik; Barbara Bartuś; Mariusz Błaszczak; Rafał Bochenek; Jacek Bogucki; Joanna Borowiak; Kamil Bortniczuk; Bożena Borys-Szopa; Lidia Burzyńska; Zbigniew Chmielowiec; Artur Chojecki; Kazimierz Choma; Dominika Chorosińska; Tadeusz Chrzan; Anna Cicholska; Krzysztof Ciecióra; Michał Cieślak; Janusz Cieszyński; Witold Czarnecki; Przemysław Czarnek; Arkadiusz Czartoryski; Lidia Czechak; Katarzyna Czochara; Anna Dąbrowska-Banaszek; Władysław Dajczak; Zbigniew Dolata; Bartłomiej Dorywalski; Przemysław Drabek; Elżbieta Duda; Jan Dziedziczak; Magdalena Filipek-Sobczak; Radosław Fogiel; Andrzej Gawron; Grzegorz Gaża; Anna Gembicka; Piotr Gliński; Małgorzata Golińska; Kazimierz Gołojuch; Agnieszka Górska; Mariusz Gosek; Marcin Grabowski; Marek Gróbarczyk; Andrzej Gut-Mostowy; Kazimierz Gwiazdowski; Marcin Gwóźdź; Czesław Hoc; Zbigniew Hoffmann; Marcin Horała; Paweł Hreniak; Paweł Jabłoński; Michał Jach; Norbert Kaczmarczyk; Filip Kaczyński; Jarosław Kaczyński; Piotr Kaleta; Sebastian Kaleta; Mariusz Kałużny; Jan Kanthak; Fryderyk Kapinos; Łukasz Kmita; Maria Koc; Andrzej Kosztowniak; Henryk Kowalczyk; Bartosz Kownacki; Jarosław Krajewski; Wiesław Krajewski; Leonard Krasulski; Piotr Król; Anna Krupka; Andrzej Kryj; Mariusz Krystian; Krzysztof Kubów; Marek Kuchciński; Wioletta Kulpa; Maria Kurowska; Władysław Kurowski; Zbigniew Kuźmiuk; Anna Kwiecień; Ewa Leniart; Joanna Lichocka; Krzysztof Lipiec; Grzegorz Lorek; Sebastian Łukaszewicz; Marzena Machałek; Antoni Macierewicz; Grzegorz Macko; Maciej Małecki; Ewa Malik; Dariusz Matecki; Jerzy Materna; Grzegorz Matusiak; Marek Matuszewski; Łukasz Mejza; Anna Milczanowska; Daniel Milewski; Mateusz Morawiecki; Jan Mosiński; Michał Moskal; Aleksander Mrówczyński; Marcin Ociepa; Bogumiła Olbryś; Anna Paluch; Teresa Pamuła; Bolesław Piecha; Grzegorz Piechowiak; Anna Pieczarka; Dariusz Piontkowski; Szymon Pogoda; Jerzy Polaczek; Piotr Polak; Marcin Porzucek; Grzegorz Puda; Zbigniew Rau; Rafał Romanowski; Urszula Rusecka; Paweł Rychlik; Paweł Sałek; Jacek Sasin; Anna Schmidt; Łukasz Schreiber; Agnieszka Ścigaj; Jarosław Sellin; Olga Semeniuk-Patkowska; Edward Siarka; Sławomir Skwarek; Andrzej Śliwka; Kazimierz Smoliński; Krzysztof Sobolewski; Agnieszka Soin; Katarzyna Sójka; Mirosława Stachowiak-Różecka; Dariusz Stefaniuk; Marek Subocz; Marek Suski; Jacek Świat; Artur Szałabawka; Wojciech Szarama; Krzysztof Szczucki; Józefa Szczurek-Żelazko; Paweł Szefernaker; Stanisław Szwed; Szymon Szynkowski vel Sęk; Krzysztof Tchórzewski; Robert Telus; Ryszard Terlecki; Włodzimierz Tomaszewski; Sylwester Tułajew; Piotr Uruski; Piotr Uściński; Marcin Warchoł; Robert Warwas; Jan Warzecha; Małgorzata Wassermann; Rafał Weber; Marek Wesoły; Patryk Wicher; Jarosław Wieczorek; Teresa Wilk; Elżbieta Witek; Agnieszka Wojciechowska van Heukelom; Michał Wójcik; Agata Wojtyszek; Michał Woś; Grzegorz Woźniak; Tadeusz Woźniak; Tomasz Zieliński; Wojciech Zubowski; Ireneusz Zyska	–	12: Krzysztof Czarnecki; Anita Czerwińska; Szymon Giżyński; Robert Gontarz; Michał Kowalski; Jacek Osuch; Monika Pawłowska; Kacper Płażyński; Marcin Romanowski; Bartłomiej Wróblewski; Jarosław Zieliński; Zbigniew Ziobro
G Civic Coalition	153: Piotr Adamowicz; Urszula Augustyn; Sylwia Bielawska; Paweł Bliźniuk; Mateusz Bochenek; Krzysztof Bojarski; Piotr Borys; Marcin Bosacki; Marek Chmielewski; Alicja Chybicka; Janusz Cichoń; Zofia Czernow; Barbara Dolniak; Andrzej Domański; Robert Dowhan; Magdalena Filiks; Joanna Frydrych; Konrad Frysztak; Patryk Gabriel; Krzysztof Gadowski; Aleksandra Gajewska; Kinga Gajewska; Elżbieta Gapińska; Zdzisław Gawlik; Elżbieta Gelert; Artur Gierada; Roman Giertych; Włodzisław Giziński; Tomasz Głogowski; Piotr Głowski; Marta Golbik; Stanisław Gorczyca; Krzysztof Grabczuk; Jan Grabiec; Małgorzata Gromadzka; Barbara Grygorcewicz; Marek Gzik; Krzysztof Habura; Agnieszka Hanajczyk; Iwona Hartwich; Marek Hok; Łukasz Horbatowski; Klaudia Jachira; Robert Jagła; Maria Janyska; Michał Jaros; Dominik Jaśkowiec; Patryk Jaskulski; Danuta Jazłowiecka; Piotr Kandyba; Jacek Karnowski; Iwona Karolewska; Katarzyna Kierzek-Koperska; Joanna Kluzik-Rostkowska; Ewa Kołodziej; Magdalena Kołodziejczak; Michał Kołodziejczak; Zbigniew Konwiński; Tomasz Kostuś; Urszula Koszutska; Aleksandra Kot; Paweł Kowal; Maria Koźlakiewicz; Iwona Kozłowska; Iwona Krawczyk; Michał Krawczyk; Wojciech Król; Katarzyna Królak; Robert Kropiwnicki; Marek Krząkała; Adam Krzemiński; Piotr Lachowicz; Artur Łącki; Stanisław Lamczyk; Maciej Lasek; Gabriela Lenartowicz; Alicja Łepkowska-Gołaś; Izabela Leszczyna; Bożena Lisowska; Dorota Łoboda; Magdalena Łośko; Katarzyna Lubnauer; Alicja Łuczak; Krystian Łuczak; Arkadiusz Marchewka; Dorota Marek; Paweł Masełko; Katarzyna Matusik-Lipiec; Jerzy Meysztowicz; Krzysztof Mieszkowski; Czesław Mroczek; Arkadiusz Myrcha; Grzegorz Napieralski; Dorota Niedziela; Jacek Niedźwiedzki; Jolanta Niezgodzka; Sławomir Nitras; Barbara Nowacka; Tomasz Nowak; Marzena Okła-Drewnowicz; Paweł Olszewski; Katarzyna Osos; Paweł Papke; Karolina Pawliczak; Małgorzata Pępek; Krzysztof Piątkowski; Katarzyna Piekarska; Lucjan Pietrzczyk; Kazimierz Plocke; Elżbieta Polak; Agnieszka Pomaska; Mariusz Popielarz; Renata Rak; Magdalena Roguska; Monika Rosa; Jakub Rutnicki; Marek Rząsa; Łukasz Ściebiorowski; Krystyna Sibińska; Rafał Siemaszko; Tomasz Siemoniak; Krystyna Skowrońska; Waldemar Sługocki; Weronika Smarduch; Anna Sobolak; Marek Sowa; Katarzyna Stachowicz; Franciszek Sterczewski; Paweł Suski; Andrzej Szewiński; Adam Szłapka; Henryk Szopiński; Krystyna Szumilas; Tomasz Szymański; Apoloniusz Tajner; Cezary Tomczyk; Maciej Tomczykiewicz; Małgorzata Tracz; Krzysztof Truskolaski; Donald Tusk; Jarosław Urbaniak; Jarosław Wałęsa; Robert Wardzała; Monika Wielichowska; Adrian Witczak; Mariusz Witczak; Przemysław Witek; Anna Wojciechowska; Bogusław Wołoszański; Maciej Wróbel; Bartosz Zawieja; Witold Zembaczyński; Urszula Zielińska	–	–	3: Henryka Krzywonos-Strycharska; Małgorzata Niemczyk; Aleksandra Uznańska-Wiśniewska
G Polish People's Party	24: Władysław Bartoszewski; Paweł Bejda; Adam Dziedzic; Henryk Kiepura; Dariusz Klimczak; Agnieszka Kłopotek; Władysław Kosiniak-Kamysz; Stefan Krajewski; Radosław Lubczyk; Mirosław Maliszewski; Mirosław Orliński; Urszula Pasławska; Krzysztof Paszyk; Michał Pyrzyk; Wiesław Różyński; Jarosław Rzepa; Tadeusz Samborski; Marek Sawicki; Czesław Siekierski; Magdalena Sroka; Stanisław Tomczyszyn; Piotr Zgorzelski; Jolanta Zięba-Gzik; Zbigniew Ziejewski	4: Marek Biernacki; Andrzej Grzyb; Urszula Nowogórska; Jacek Tomczak	–	4: Ireneusz Raś; Henryk Smolarz; Zbigniew Sosnowski; Bożena Żelazowska
G The Left	20: Bożena Borowiec; Włodzimierz Czarzasty; Jacek Czerniak; Agnieszka Dziemianowicz-Bąk; Krzysztof Gawkowski; Daria Gosek-Popiołek; Katarzyna Kotula; Piotr Kowal; Anita Kucharska-Dziedzic; Marcin Kulasek; Dorota Olko; Arkadiusz Sikora; Wiesław Szczepański; Andrzej Szejna; Tadeusz Tomaszewski; Tomasz Trela; Katarzyna Ueberhan; Joanna Wicha; Dariusz Wieczorek; Anna Maria Żukowska	–	–	1: Wanda Nowicka
Confederation Liberty and Independence	–	12: Karina Bosak; Krzysztof Bosak; Bronisław Foltyn; Sławomir Mentzen; Krzysztof Mulawa; Bartłomiej Pejo; Grzegorz Płaczek; Michał Połuboczek; Krzysztof Szymański; Krzysztof Tuduj; Michał Wawer; Andrzej Zapałowski	–	4: Konrad Berkowicz; Witold Tumanowicz; Ryszard Wilk; Przemysław Wipler
G Centre Poland	11: Adam Gomoła; Piotr Górnikiewicz; Michał Gramatyka; Bożenna Hołownia; Szymon Hołownia; Łukasz Osmalak; Ewa Schädler; Paweł Śliz; Piotr Strach; Wioleta Tomczak; Kamil Wnuk	–	–	4: Agnieszka Buczyńska; Adam Luboński; Maja Nowak; Bartosz Romowicz
G Poland 2050	14: Elżbieta Burkiewicz; Żaneta Cwalina-Śliwowska; Sławomir Ćwik; Paulina Hennig-Kloska; Rafał Kasprzyk; Rafał Komarewicz; Aleksandra Leo; Barbara Okuła; Barbara Oliwiecka; Ryszard Petru; Norbert Pietrykowski; Marcin Skonieczka; Mirosław Suchoń; Ewa Szymanowska	–	–	1: Izabela Bodnar
Direct Democracy	–	2: Jan Krzysztof Ardanowski; Tomasz Rzymkowski	1: Paweł Kukiz	1: Jarosław Sachajko
Partia Razem	4: Maciej Konieczny; Marta Stożek; Adrian Zandberg; Marcelina Zawisza	–	–	–
Confederation of the Polish Crown	–	3: Roman Fritz; Włodzimierz Skalik; Sławomir Zawiślak	–	–
Independent	4: Marcin Józefaciuk; Paulina Matysiak; Joanna Mucha; Tomasz Zimoch	2: Marek Jakubiak; Janusz Kowalski	–	1: Paweł Zalewski
Total	230	198	1	31
Total	50.0%	43.0%	0.2%	6.7%

The Sejm failed to override Nawrocki's veto on 17 September, as expected. The vote to override was 232–199, falling 27 votes short of the three-fifth majority required to override a presidential veto.

== Same-sex marriage ==
=== Constitutional ban ===
Article 18 of the Constitution of Poland states that:

Marriage, as a union of a man and a woman, as well as the family, motherhood and parenthood, shall be placed under the protection and care of the Republic of Poland. (Note: Polish: Małżeństwo jako związek kobiety i mężczyzny, rodzina, macierzyństwo i rodzicielstwo znajdują się pod ochroną i opieką Rzeczypospolitej Polskiej.)

The article was adopted in 1997 following the fall of communism. The purpose of the article has been to ensure that legislators would not be able to legalize same-sex marriage without changing the Constitution. Jurists have generally interpreted it as a constitutional ban on same-sex marriage. Several lawyers and jurists have argued that the article does not formally define marriage, and while promoting opposite-sex marriages, does not in itself ban same-sex marriage. However, the courts have ruled several times that Article 18 specifies "marriage as a union of exclusively of a woman and a man". On 11 May 2005, the Constitutional Tribunal ruled that:

The Polish Constitution specifies marriage as a union of exclusively of a woman and a man. Thus, a contrario, it does not allow same-sex relationships. [...] Marriage (as a union of a woman and a man) has obtained a separate constitutional status within the domestic law of the Republic of Poland, on the basis of Article 18 of the Constitution. Any change of this status would be possible only by the way of an amendment to the Constitution, according to Article 235 thereof.)

On 9 November 2010, the Constitutional Tribunal held that "the doctrine of constitutional law also indicates that the only normative element that can be decoded from Article 18 of the Constitution is the principle of heterosexuality of marriage." On 25 October 2016, the Supreme Administrative Court of Poland stated that:

The Act on Publicly Funded Healthcare Benefits does not explain, however, who is a spouse. But this concept is sufficiently and clearly defined in the aforementioned Article 18 of the Constitution of the Republic of Poland, which refers to marriage as a union between a woman and a man. The literature emphasizes that Article 18 of the Constitution establishes the principle of heterosexuality of marriage, [...] which prohibits lawmakers from statutory granting the status of marriage to relationships between persons of the same sex. Therefore, it is obvious that marriage in the light of the Constitution, and hence, in the light of Polish law, can only be, and is only a heterosexual union, and thus same-sex individuals cannot be spouses in a marriage.

=== Recognition of marriages performed abroad ===
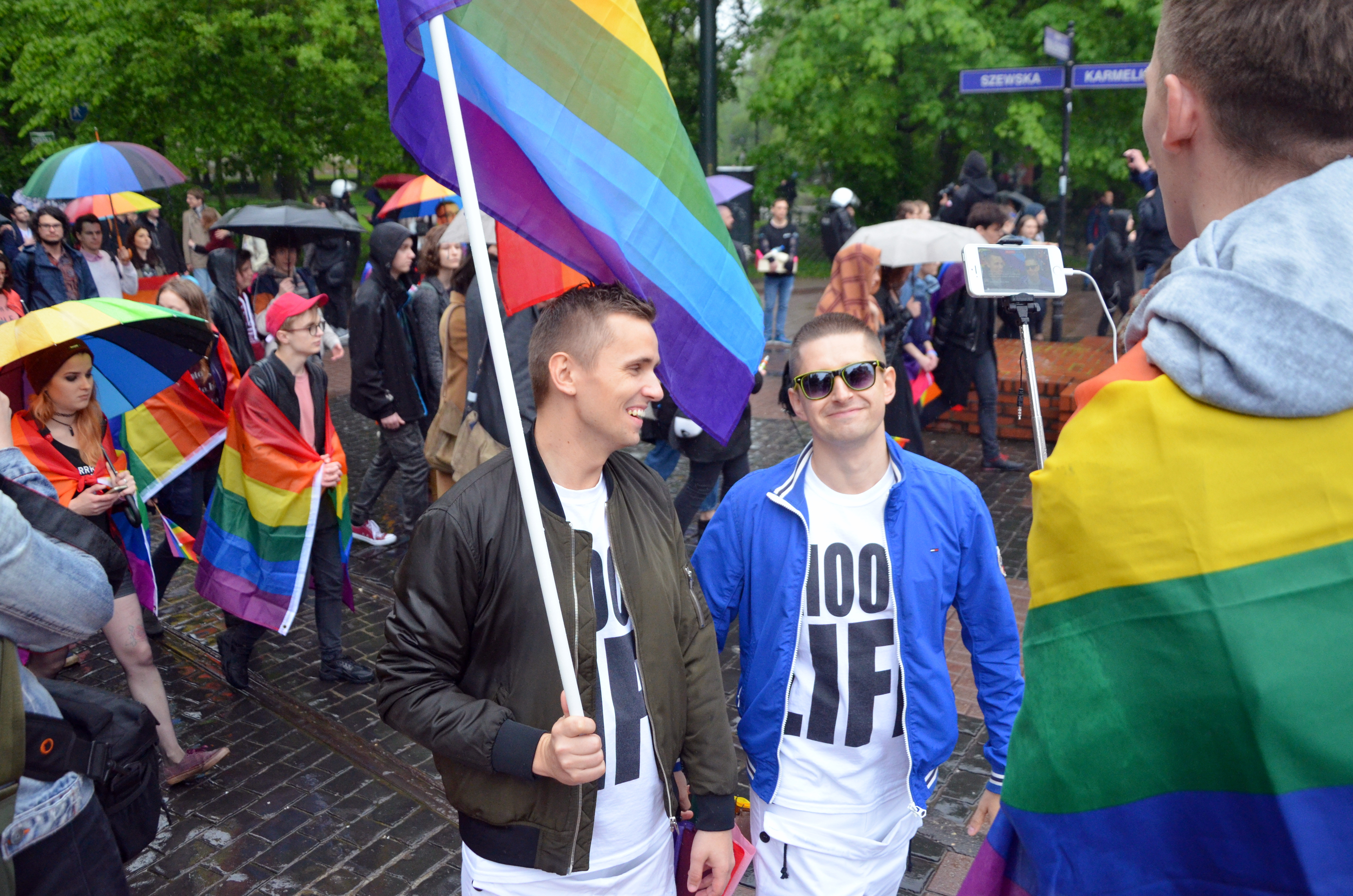
Dawid Mycek (left) and Jakub Kwieciński (right), the couple who filed suit at the Supreme Administrative Court seeking recognition of foreign same-sex marriages in Poland, Kraków, May 2017

==== Early cases ====
In 2018, the Supreme Administrative Court ruled that "Article 18 of the Constitution of the Republic of Poland, which defines marriage as a union of a man and a woman, [...] requires to treat only a heterosexual union as a marriage in Poland". Specifically, the court ruled that registering same-sex marriages performed outside of Poland would breach the Constitution and the Private International Law Act (Polish: Ustawa z dnia 4 lutego 2011 r. Prawo prywatne międzynarodowe). Seeking to test the legal wording further, a same-sex couple, Jakub Kwieciński and Dawid Mycek, applied to have their marriage, performed in Portugal in June 2017, recognised in Poland. Their application was rejected by the Civil Status Office in Warsaw, which cited Article 18 of the Constitution and argued that "transcribing the marriage certificate of two persons of the same sex would be contrary to the fundamental principles of the legal order of the Republic of Poland". On 8 January 2019, the Masovian Voivodeship Administrative Court ruled that their marriage could not be recognised under Polish law. However, in a landmark decision, it ruled that should the Family Code and other statutes provide for same-sex marriage than Article 18 would not provide a direct obstacle. The Campaign Against Homophobia praised the ruling, while the Ministry of Justice questioned the court's legal authority. The couple sought legal advice on whether to appeal certain parts of the ruling, namely those pertaining to the refusal to recognise their marriage. On 6 July 2022, the Supreme Administrative Court upheld the lower court ruling that the marriage could not be recognized in Poland. However, the court agreed with the finding that Article 18 "cannot in itself constitute an obstacle to transcribing a foreign marriage certificate if the institution of marriage as a union of persons of the same sex was provided for in the domestic [legal] order". Kwieciński and Mycek called it a "historical ruling". The judgment was labelled as "fake news" by Ordo Iuris, an ultra-conservative think-tank, which pointed out that another section of the judgment stated that Article 18 "does not prejudge the impossibility of legally regulating same-sex relationships; however, it emphasises the special protection of marriage, but as a relationship between a woman and a man". The court issued a similar ruling later that year, upholding a lower court ruling that the marriage of Agata Kowalska and Emilia Barabasz, performed in Germany in 2018, could not be recognized in Poland but also that "[A]rticle 18 does not prevent parliament from introducing the institution of same-sex civil partnerships in [the] future". The couple announced their decision to file suit with the European Court of Human Rights.

In a judgement issued on 19 September 2024, the European Court of Human Rights ruled in Formela and Others v Poland that the government had violated the rights of same-sex couples by refusing to recognise their marriages conducted abroad. This case involved two couples who had married in the United Kingdom and Denmark in 2015. Attempts to register their marriages in Poland were rejected by the Civil Status Office in Gdańsk on the basis that "registering their marriage would be contrary to Polish legal order in breach of, inter alia, Article 18 of the Constitution which provided that a marriage was only possible between two people of opposite sex." The ECHR found the refusal a violation of Article 8 of the European Convention on Human Rights. It issued a similar ruling, Szypuła and Others v Poland, on 27 February 2025, finding that the government's refusal to recognise two same-sex marriages performed in Spain violated Article 8, which imposes a positive obligation to provide a legal framework recognizing and protecting same-sex unions. It ruled similarly in Andersen v Poland on 24 April 2025. Further, in Gruszczyński‑Ręgowski and Others v Poland, the court removed similar applications from its docket through the friendly settlement procedure on 7 May 2025. This followed the Polish Government's unilateral declarations in which it acknowledged having breached Article 8 of the European Convention on Human Rights.

==== European Court of Justice rulings in Coman and Others and Cupriak-Trojan and Trojan ====
On 5 June 2018, the European Court of Justice (ECJ) ruled in favour of a Romanian-American same-sex couple seeking recognition of their marriage in Romania, so that the American partner could reside in the country. The court held in Coman and Others v General Inspectorate for Immigration and Ministry of the Interior that European Union (EU) member states must uphold the freedom of movement and residency rights of same-sex spouses, provided that one partner is an EU citizen. While EU member states may choose whether to legalise same-sex marriage, they cannot restrict the right of residence for EU citizens and their spouses. The ECJ also clarified that the term "spouse" is gender-neutral and does not necessarily refer to someone of the opposite sex.

The Supreme Administrative Court announced in 2023 that it would ask the European Court of Justice to rule on whether same-sex marriages conducted in other member states of the European Union should be recognised in Poland. This case involved a dual Polish-German couple, Mateusz Trojan and Jakub Cupriak-Trojan, who had married in Germany but sought recognition of their marriage in Poland. The court issued its ruling in Jakub Cupriak-Trojan and Mateusz Trojan v Wojewoda Mazowiecki on 25 November 2025, finding that Poland must recognise same-sex marriages performed in other member states of the European Union. Prime Minister Donald Tusk said the government would "respect" the court judgement. Minister of Foreign Affairs Radosław Sikorski was tasked with assessing the consequences of the court ruling, and Justice Minister Waldemar Żurek added that Polish law "[would] need to be adapted in light of the decision". Świdnica was the first city to announce that its registry office would register the marriage licenses of same-sex couples.

In January 2026, the government announced plans to change civil documents, such as marriage licenses, to incorporate the ECJ ruling. The proposed changes, set to take effect on 23 August, would include replacing "woman" and "man" on marriage licenses with "first spouse" (pierwszy małżonek) and "second spouse" (drugi małżonek). Minister of Digital Affairs Krzysztof Gawkowski said, "Today I signed the documents that start the process of changing the templates of civil status records, so that the state operates efficiently and equally towards all citizens. [...] The CJEU's judgment is not a matter of ideology, it is a legal obligation that Poland must comply with." In March, the Supreme Administrative Court ordered the Civil Status Office in Warsaw to record the marriage license of Trojan and Cupriak-Trojan for administrative and residency purposes. However, the ECJ ruling does not explicitly state that marriages concluded in other EU member states automatically acquire the same rights as marriages concluded in Poland: "It guarantees those rights that arise from EU law. Therefore, it does not cover, for example, issues such as joint property or tax settlements between spouses, as these areas are not harmonised at the EU level." Further, legal experts, including Human Rights Commissioner Marcin Wiącek, have warned that other couples would likely face difficulties in recording their foreign marriage certificates into the Polish system until the government changes the law. One legal expert further noted, "We could end up with a situation where you can register your Spanish marriage in Świdnica – a city whose left-wing mayor has expressed a desire to begin recognising same-sex unions – but not in some town with a conservative mayor." Courts in Gorzów Wielkopolski, Lublin and Olsztyn also subsequently ordered recognition of foreign same-sex marriages.

On 7 May 2026, the Supreme Administrative Court ordered the government to recognise three more same-sex marriages. On 12 May, Prime Minister Donald Tusk apologised to same-sex couples for the "years of rejection and humiliation" they had experienced due to the lack of recognition of their relationships in Poland. He noted that Poland currently "lacks statutory regulations" allowing such recognition. Tusk did not specify precisely what steps would be needed to implement the Cupriak-Trojan and Trojan ruling, and added that whatever steps were taken to recognise same-sex marriages performed in other EU member states they would be "in no way a path to [allowing] adoption". On the same day, the Mayor of Warsaw, Rafał Trzaskowski, announced that the city would begin registering same-sex marriage certificates, "despite a lack of regulation at the national level". The first such certificate was issued on 14 May to Mateusz Trojan and Jakub Cupriak-Trojan. The couple stated that their names had been entered incorrectly under the "man" and "woman" fields, despite both individuals being male. When two male or two female names were entered into the registry, the system flagged the entries as errors and prevented the administration from proceeding with the request. A further unresolved question concerns the legal effects of transcribing foreign same-sex marriages into the Polish civil registry, given that Polish law does not recognise any form of same-sex relationship. A second same-sex marriage was transcribed into the civil registry on 15 May in Wrocław. On 22 May, officials in Zakopane announced that they would refuse to transcribe foreign same-sex marriage certificates, arguing that doing so would violate the Polish Constitution and conflict with Poland's "traditional and religious values". On 28 May, a same-sex couple legally married in Germany was turned away by registry officials in Poznań and advised to file their application in Wrocław or wait for national software updates to take effect. City officials defended the decision, citing technical limitations within the national registry system and stating that the office was awaiting the entry into force of the ordinance issued by the Ministry of Internal Affairs and Administration and the Ministry of Digital Affairs, scheduled to take effect in mid-August 2026.

On 28 July 2026, the Constitutional Tribunal, which has been subject to an appointment crisis since 2015 and issues rulings aligned with the political interests of the conservative Law and Justice party, ruled in direct violation of EU law that same-sex marriages contracted in other EU member states could not be transcribed into the Polish civil registry. The government responded that it would not comply with the decision and that "the regulation would enter into force as planned" on 23 August. Minister Gawkowski said, "The illegal Constitutional Tribunal is once again attempting to obstruct a state that is enforcing the law in force and the rulings of European courts. The transcription of foreign same-sex marriage certificates is and will remain legal," adding that 184 same-sex couples had had their foreign marriage certificates transcribed by then. The regulations took effect as planned on 23 August, with up to 500 same-sex marriages transcribed by early October. Subsequently, Minister of Family, Labour and Social Policy Agnieszka Dziemianowicz-Bąk announced that the Social Insurance Institution had begun paying care allowances to qualifying married same-sex couples, and Finance Minister Andrzej Domański announced that same-sex spouses would enjoy preferential treatment under inheritance and gift tax rules and the ability to file joint personal income tax returns; "Today, I signed a general interpretation ensuring that persons who have obtained a transcription of their marriage certificate will have the same tax rights and obligations in Polish tax offices as all other married couples," said Domański on 24 September.

=== Religious performance ===
The Catholic Church holds immense social prestige and a considerable degree of influence in Polish politics, having close ties with the social conservative Law and Justice party. The Church strongly opposes same-sex marriage and does not allow its priests to officiate at such marriages. Several clergy have also been accused of incitement to hatred, including the Archbishop of Kraków, Marek Jędraszewski, whose 2019 remarks on the LGBT community were compared to "incitement to genocide". Despite around 71% of the Polish population identifying as Catholic in 2021 (down from 88% in 2011), support for same-sex marriage continues to increase steadily. This may be due to a significant increase of cultural liberalism in the realm of individual rights in recent years, where the Church traditionally had most influence, especially on family issues. In addition, a series of revelations of child sex abuses by Catholic clergy and the poor response by the church hierarchy to deal with such cases have contributed to a decline in church membership. Another common factor cited among those leaving the Church was "anger at [its] interference in politics and outdated views", notably on abortion. In December 2023, the Holy See published Fiducia supplicans, a declaration allowing Catholic priests to bless couples who are not considered to be married according to church teaching, including the blessing of same-sex couples. The Polish Episcopal Conference suggested only blessing "individual people living in complete abstinence".

In May 2024, a Catholic same-sex couple were blessed in a parish of the Polish Reformed Church in Warsaw by Pastor Michał Jabłoński. According to the Rzeczpospolita newspaper, the Reformed Church is the only Christian denomination in Poland that blesses same-sex unions.

== Public opinion ==
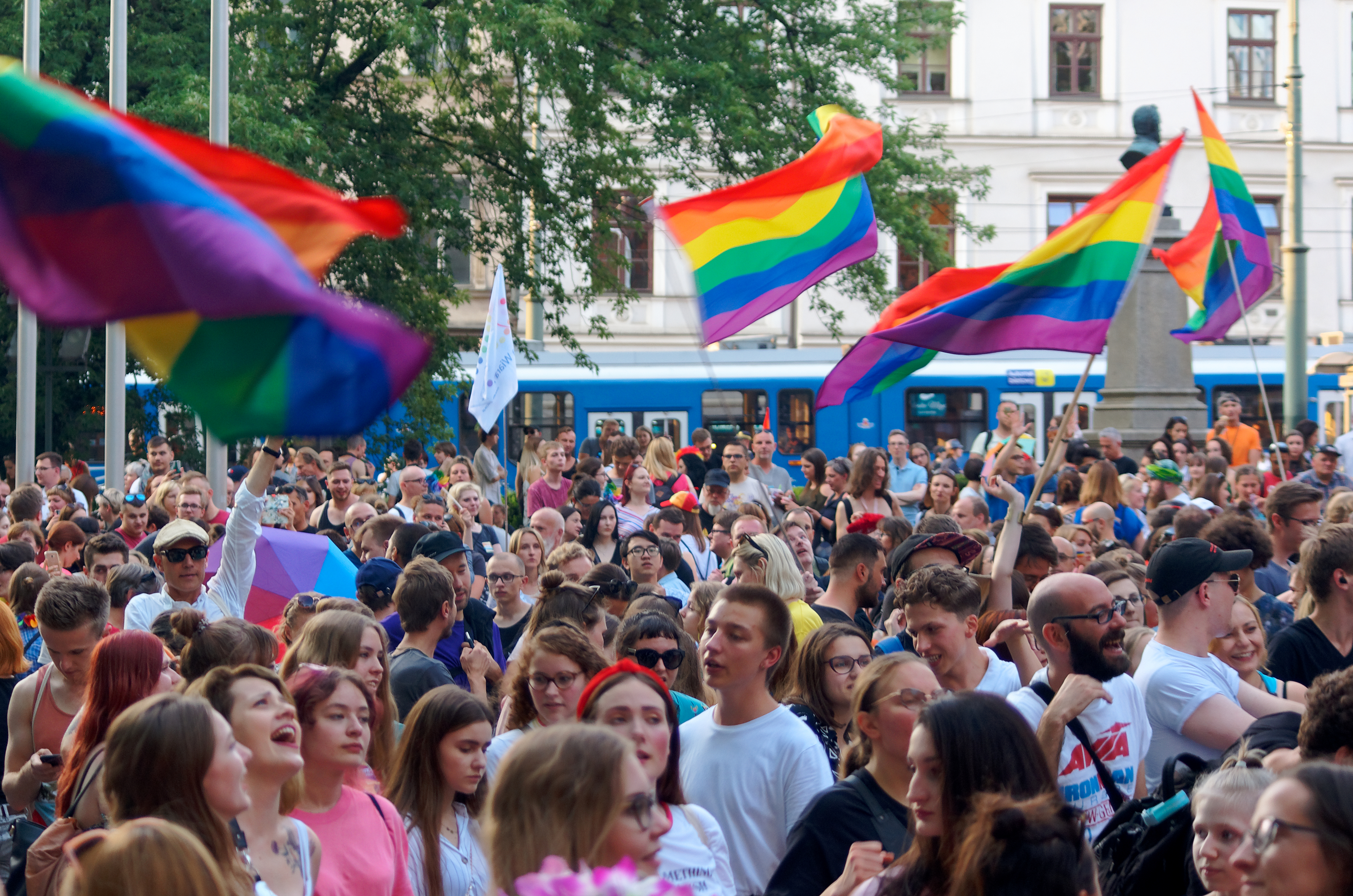
Participants at a march in Kraków in favour of LGBT rights, including registered partnerships and same-sex marriage, 2019

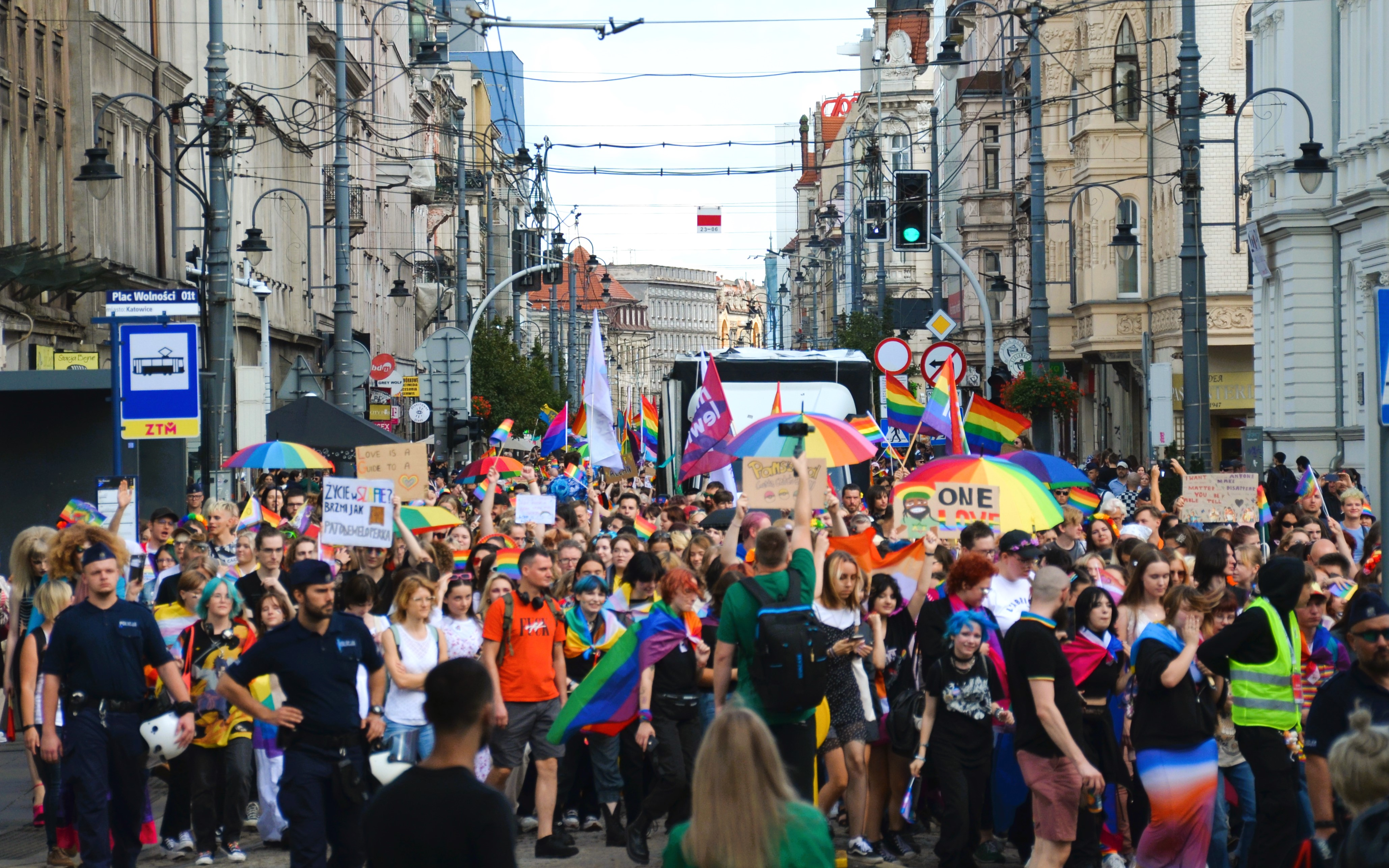
Demonstrators in support of LGBT rights and same-sex marriage in Katowice, 2023

Recent polls have reported a trend in favor of same-sex marriage and registered partnerships. All opinion polls conducted since 2022 have found that a majority of Polish people support same-sex civil partnerships. Support for registered partnerships is higher among young people, people who have a higher education, who live in big cities, who have a higher income, who are less religious and who are politically left-wing.

The Centre for Public Opinion Research (CBOS; Centrum Badania Opinii Społecznej) has conducted opinion surveys on the issue of registered partnerships and same-sex marriage since 2001, though has often found limited support in comparison to other polling organizations. In 2001, 24% of respondents supported same-sex marriage. This decreased to 22% in 2005, though 46% of Poles expressed support for registered partnerships that year. Support remained relatively stable for the following five years, with support for partnerships at 41% and 45% in 2008 and 2010 respectively. In 2011, the polling organization showed that 25% of Poles supported same-sex marriage, while 69% were opposed. In 2013, it placed support for partnerships at 33% and for same-sex marriage at 26%. This poll found that support for same-sex registered partnerships varied significantly by political parties: 68% of Your Movement (formerly RP) voters, 56% of SLD voters, 50% of PO voters, 24% of PSL voters and 15% of PiS voters.

A 2012 Center for Evaluation and Analysis of Public Policies (CEAPP; Centrum Ewaluacji i Analiz Polityk Publicznych) poll showed that although a minority (23%) of Poles supported registered partnerships, there was majority support for various rights and benefits being granted to same-sex couples. 68% of respondents supported allowing same-sex partners to obtain medical information, 57% supported inheritance rights, 55% supported rights to common tax accounting, 55% supported the right to inherit the pension of a deceased partner, whereas 20% supported the right to a refund for in vitro fertilisation and 16% supported adoption rights. A 2013 TNS OBOP survey showed that 67% of Poles supported the legalization of registered partnerships for opposite-sex couples, though only 47% thought it should apply to same-sex couples. This marked a decrease from a TNS OBOP poll two years earlier, when 54% of respondents expressed support for same-sex registered partnerships. A 2013 Institute of Social and Economic Research (INSE; Instytut Nauk Społeczno-Ekonomicznych) survey found that only 30% of Poles were in favour of registered partnerships.

A 2013 PBS poll estimated that 40% of Poles were in favour of registered partnerships, 30% in favour of same-sex marriage, and 17% in favour of adoption rights. A 2015 survey commissioned by Miłość Nie Wyklucza found that 55% of Poles supported some form of recognition for same-sex couples, but only 37% supported partnerships and 29% supported same-sex marriage. The 2015 Eurobarometer found that 28% of Poles thought same-sex marriage should be allowed throughout Europe, while 61% were opposed. This was an 11% increase from the previous Eurobarometer, which was conducted in 2006. Additionally, the number of those who "strongly opposed" same-sex marriage almost halved between 2006 and 2015.

A June 2017 Ipsos survey found that 52% of Poles were in favour of registered partnerships and 38% in favour of same-sex marriage. According to a Pew Research Center poll conducted later that year, 32% of Poles supported same-sex marriage (25% "somewhat" and 8% "strongly"). A 2018 Institute for Market and Social Research (IBRiS; Instytut Badań Rynkowych i Społecznych) poll showed that 59% of Poles supported recognising same-sex marriages validly performed abroad, whilst 30% were opposed. A survey conducted by the same polling organization the following year showed that 44% of Polish people supported registered partnerships, 32% supported same-sex marriage, and 12% supported adoption by same-sex couples. The 2019 Eurobarometer found a large increase in support, with 45% of Poles in support of same-sex marriage, and 50% opposed. This increase of 17% from 2015 was the second-highest in the European Union, after Germany at 18%. Of countries forming the former Eastern Bloc (excluding East Germany), Poland ranked second in support for same-sex marriage, after the Czech Republic. An August 2019 Ipsos poll for OKO.press showed similar numbers: 41% in favour of same-sex marriage and 60% in favour of registered partnerships, as did a Kantar Group survey conducted the following month: 42% in favour of same-sex marriage and 57% in favour of partnerships. By 2022, support had increased to 64% for partnerships, 48% for same-sex marriage, and 24% for adoption rights according to a IBRiS survey for Radio ZET.

A GLOBSEC survey conducted in March 2023 showed that 54% of Poles supported same-sex marriage, while 38% were opposed. This was the first time a poll had found majority support for same-sex marriage in Poland. The 2023 Eurobarometer found that 50% of Poles thought same-sex marriage should be legalized throughout Europe, while 45% disagreed. A 2023 Pew Research Center poll showed that 41% of Poles supported same-sex marriage (28% "somewhat" and 13% "strongly"), a 9% increase from six years prior.

In a poll conducted in April 2024 by United Surveys, 50% of respondents supported same-sex marriage and 66% supported same-sex civil partnerships. 86% of supporters of the ruling coalition supported same-sex marriage and 97% supported same-sex civil partnerships. A June 2024 poll by Rzeczpospolita showed that 63% of respondents supported same-sex civil partnerships, while an Ipsos poll conducted that same month found that 67% of Poles supported the right of same-sex couples to marry or legally register their relationship. A September 2024 Ipsos found that 51% of Poles supported same-sex marriage, while 43% opposed it. In addition, 62% of Poles supported civil partnerships for same-sex couples, while 33% opposed it.

== See also ==
- LGBT rights in Poland
- LGBT rights in the European Union
- Recognition of same-sex unions in Europe
