= Sejm Constituency no. 11 =

Polish parliamentary constituency

Sieradz
- Constituency for the Sejm
- Location of Sieradz within Poland
- Counties: Kutno County; Łask County; Łęczyca County; Łowicz County; Pabianice County; Pajęczno County; Poddębice County; Sieradz County; Wieluń County; Wieruszów County; Zduńska Wola County; Zgierz County
- Voivodeship: Łódź
- Population: 912,747 (2022)
- Electorate: 731,875 (2023)

Current Constituency
- Created: 2001
- Seats: 12
- Deputies: List: Paweł Bejda (PSL); Krzysztof Habura (PO-KO); Agnieszka Hanajczyk (PO-KO); Joanna Lichocka (PiS); Marek Matuszewski (PiS); Paulina Matysiak (Razem); Piotr Polak (PiS); Marcin Przydacz (PiS); Paweł Rychlik (PiS); Cezary Tomczyk (PO-KO); Tadeusz Woźniak (PiS); Jolanta Zięba-Gzik (PSL)

Sieradz, officially known as Constituency no. 11 (Polish: Okręg wyborczy nr 11), is one of the 41 constituencies of the Sejm, the lower house of the Parliament of Poland, the national legislature of Poland. The constituency was established in 2001, after a major redistricting process across Poland. It is located in the Łódź Voivodeship and includes the area of the following counties: Kutno, Łask, Łęczyca, Łowicz, Pabianice, Pajęczno, Poddębice, Sieradz, Wieluń, Wieruszów, Zduńska Wola and Zgierz. The constituency's district electoral commission is located in Sieradz.
The constituency currently elects 12 of the 460 members of the Sejm using the open party-list proportional representation electoral system. At the 2023 parliamentary election it had 731,875 citizens eligible to vote.

== List of deputies ==
Deputies for the 10th Sejm (2023–2027)
| Deputy | Party | Parliamentary group |
|---|---|---|
| Krzysztof Habura | Civic Platform | Civic Coalition |
| Agnieszka Hanajczyk | Civic Platform | Civic Coalition |
| Cezary Tomczyk | Civic Platform | Civic Coalition |
| Joanna Lichocka | Law and Justice | United Right |
| Marek Matuszewski | Law and Justice | United Right |
| Piotr Polak | Law and Justice | United Right |
| Marcin Przydacz | Law and Justice | United Right |
| Paweł Rychlik | Law and Justice | United Right |
| Tadeusz Woźniak | Law and Justice | United Right |
| Paweł Bejda | Polish People's Party | Polish People's Party |
| Jolanta Zięba-Gzik | Polish People's Party | Polish People's Party |
| Paulina Matysiak | Independent | Independent |

== Election results ==
=== 2001 ===
2001 parliamentary election: Sieradz
| Party | Votes | % | Seats |
|---|---|---|---|
| Democratic Left Alliance – Labour Union | 139,616 | 41.05 | 5 |
| Self-Defence of the Republic of Poland | 60,404 | 17.76 | 2 |
| Polish People's Party | 47,176 | 13.87 | 2 |
| Civic Platform | 26,667 | 7.84 | 1 |
| League of Polish Families | 25,532 | 7.51 | 1 |
| Law and Justice | 19,617 | 5.77 | 1 |
| Solidarity of the Right Electoral Action | 13,110 | 3.85 | – |
| Freedom Union | 5,413 | 1.59 | – |
| Polish Socialist Party | 1,434 | 0.42 | – |
| Social Alternative Movement | 1,130 | 0.33 | – |
| Total | 340,099 | 100.00 | 12 |
| Valid votes | 340,099 | 95.19 | |
| Invalid/blank votes | 17,173 | 4.81 | |
| Total votes | 357,272 | 100.00 | |
| Registered voters/turnout | 775,872 | 46.05 | |
Source: National Electoral Commission

=== 2005 ===
2005 parliamentary election: Sieradz
| Party | Votes | % | Seats |
|---|---|---|---|
| Self-Defence of the Republic of Poland | 62,787 | 21.87 | 3 |
| Law and Justice | 61,376 | 21.38 | 3 |
| Civic Platform | 43,168 | 15.04 | 2 |
| Democratic Left Alliance | 42,646 | 14.86 | 2 |
| Polish People's Party | 35,061 | 12.21 | 1 |
| League of Polish Families | 19,062 | 6.64 | 1 |
| Social Democracy of Poland | 7,526 | 2.62 | – |
| Democratic Party – demokraci.pl | 4,693 | 1.63 | – |
| Patriotic Movement | 4,486 | 1.56 | – |
| Polish Labour Party | 2,387 | 0.83 | – |
| Initiative of the Republic of Poland | 1,801 | 0.63 | – |
| Polish National Party | 1,189 | 0.41 | – |
| All-Polish Civic Coalition | 874 | 0.30 | – |
| Total | 287,056 | 100.00 | 12 |
| Valid votes | 287,056 | 95.45 | |
| Invalid/blank votes | 13,688 | 4.55 | |
| Total votes | 300,744 | 100.00 | |
| Registered voters/turnout | 790,549 | 38.04 | |
Source: National Electoral Commission

=== 2007 ===
2007 parliamentary election: Sieradz
| Party | Votes | % | Seats |
|---|---|---|---|
| Law and Justice | 134,384 | 35.14 | 5 |
| Civic Platform | 116,485 | 30.46 | 4 |
| Polish People's Party | 53,730 | 14.05 | 2 |
| Left and Democrats | 53,639 | 14.03 | 1 |
| Self-Defence of the Republic of Poland | 10,351 | 2.71 | – |
| Women's Party | 5,579 | 1.46 | – |
| League of Polish Families | 4,683 | 1.22 | – |
| Polish Labour Party | 3,536 | 0.92 | – |
| Total | 382,387 | 100.00 | 12 |
| Valid votes | 382,387 | 97.70 | |
| Invalid/blank votes | 8,999 | 2.30 | |
| Total votes | 391,386 | 100.00 | |
| Registered voters/turnout | 792,112 | 49.41 | |
Source: National Electoral Commission

=== 2011 ===
2011 parliamentary election: Sieradz
| Party | Votes | % | Seats |
|---|---|---|---|
| Law and Justice | 109,205 | 32.13 | 5 |
| Civic Platform | 106,601 | 31.36 | 4 |
| Polish People's Party | 42,671 | 12.55 | 1 |
| Palikot's Movement | 35,623 | 10.48 | 1 |
| Democratic Left Alliance | 29,933 | 8.81 | 1 |
| Poland Comes First | 5,866 | 1.73 | – |
| Congress of the New Right | 5,713 | 1.68 | – |
| Polish Labour Party - August 80 | 1,924 | 0.57 | – |
| Our Home Poland – Andrzej Lepper's Self-Defense | 1,388 | 0.41 | – |
| Right Wing | 976 | 0.29 | – |
| Total | 339,900 | 100.00 | 12 |
| Valid votes | 339,900 | 95.48 | |
| Invalid/blank votes | 16,097 | 4.52 | |
| Total votes | 355,997 | 100.00 | |
| Registered voters/turnout | 794,134 | 44.83 | |
Source: National Electoral Commission

=== 2015 ===
2015 parliamentary election: Sieradz
| Party | Votes | % | Seats |
|---|---|---|---|
| Law and Justice | 147,623 | 39.93 | 7 |
| Civic Platform | 78,314 | 21.18 | 3 |
| Kukiz'15 | 32,973 | 8.92 | 1 |
| United Left | 30,256 | 8.18 | – |
| Polish People's Party | 29,044 | 7.86 | 1 |
| Modern | 19,681 | 5.32 | – |
| KORWiN | 15,171 | 4.10 | – |
| Together | 13,077 | 3.54 | – |
| Centipede Polish Party | 1,905 | 0.52 | – |
| Grzegorz Braun's Electoral Committee "God Bless You!" | 989 | 0.27 | – |
| Self-Defence | 712 | 0.19 | – |
| Total | 369,745 | 100.00 | 12 |
| Valid votes | 369,745 | 97.67 | |
| Invalid/blank votes | 8,808 | 2.33 | |
| Total votes | 378,553 | 100.00 | |
| Registered voters/turnout | 786,549 | 48.13 | |
Source: National Electoral Commission

=== 2019 ===
2019 parliamentary election: Sieradz
| Party | Votes | % | Seats |
|---|---|---|---|
| Law and Justice | 229,245 | 49.81 | 7 |
| Civic Coalition | 94,268 | 20.48 | 3 |
| The Left | 55,116 | 11.98 | 1 |
| Polish People's Party | 47,373 | 10.29 | 1 |
| Confederation Liberty and Independence | 27,054 | 5.88 | – |
| Nonpartisan Local Government Activists | 7,183 | 1.56 | – |
| Total | 460,239 | 100.00 | 12 |
| Valid votes | 460,239 | 98.73 | |
| Invalid/blank votes | 5,916 | 1.27 | |
| Total votes | 466,155 | 100.00 | |
| Registered voters/turnout | 765,170 | 60.92 | |
Source: National Electoral Commission

=== 2023 ===
2023 parliamentary election: Sieradz
| Party | Votes | % | Seats |
|---|---|---|---|
| Law and Justice | 221,031 | 41.46 | 6 |
| Civic Coalition | 138,038 | 25.89 | 3 |
| Third Way | 77,313 | 14.50 | 2 |
| The Left | 41,188 | 7.73 | 1 |
| Confederation Liberty and Independence | 36,383 | 6.82 | – |
| Nonpartisan Local Government Activists | 8,653 | 1.62 | – |
| There is One Poland | 7,747 | 1.45 | – |
| Prosperity and Peace Movement | 2,775 | 0.52 | – |
| Total | 533,128 | 100.00 | 12 |
| Valid votes | 533,128 | 97.82 | |
| Invalid/blank votes | 11,867 | 2.18 | |
| Total votes | 544,995 | 100.00 | |
| Registered voters/turnout | 731,875 | 74.47 | |
Source: National Electoral Commission
