= Sieradz =

Town in Łódź Voivodeship, Poland

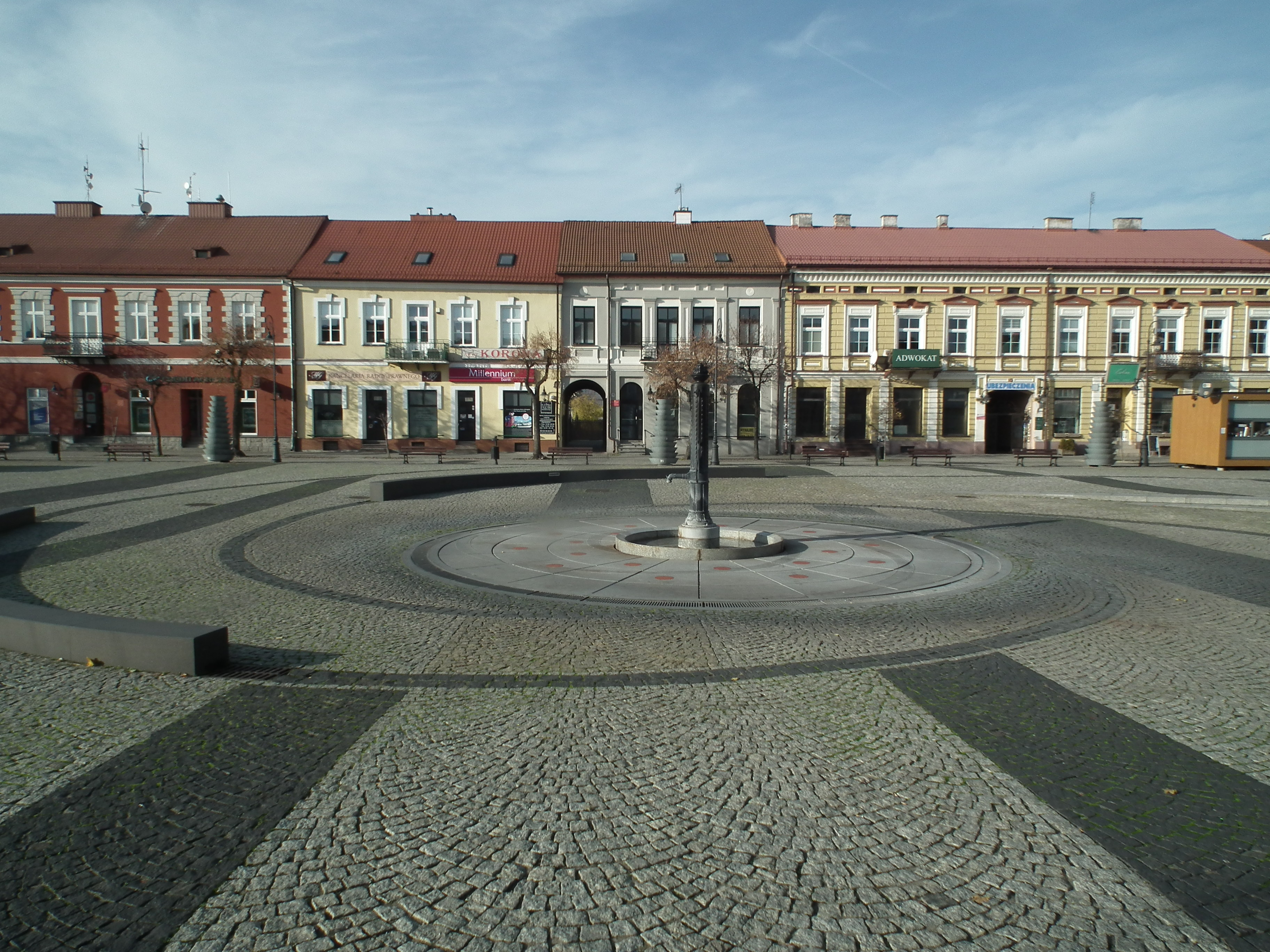
- Market Square

- Flag Coat of arms

- Location within Poland
- Coordinates: 51°36′N 18°45′E
- Country: Poland
- Voivodeship: Łódź
- County: Sieradz
- Gmina: Sieradz (urban gmina)
- Established: 11th century
- First mentioned: 1136
- City rights: 1247

Government
  - City mayor: Paweł Osiewała

Area
  - Total: 51.22 km^{2} (19.78 sq mi)

Population (31 December 2021)
  - Total: 40,891 ▼
  - Density: 798.3/km^{2} (2,068/sq mi)
- Time zone: UTC+1 (CET)
  - Summer (DST): UTC+2 (CEST)
- Postal code: 98-200
- Area code: +48 043
- Car plates: ESI
- Website: www.sieradz.eu

Sieradz [ˈɕɛrat͡s] (Latin: Siradia) is a city on the Warta river in central Poland with 40,891 inhabitants (2021). It is the seat of the Sieradz County, situated in the Łódź Voivodeship. Sieradz is a capital of the historical Sieradz Land.

Sieradz is one of the oldest cities in Poland. It was an important city of medieval Poland, thrice being a location for the election of the Polish monarchs. Polish Kings chaired six assemblies from here. Historically, it was the capital of the Duchy of Sieradz (1263-1339), Sieradz Voivodeship (1339–1793), and Sieradz Voivodeship (1975–1998). It is located on the Route of the Heroes of the Battle of Warsaw 1920, the main highway connecting Wrocław with Łódź, Warsaw and Białystok.

== History ==
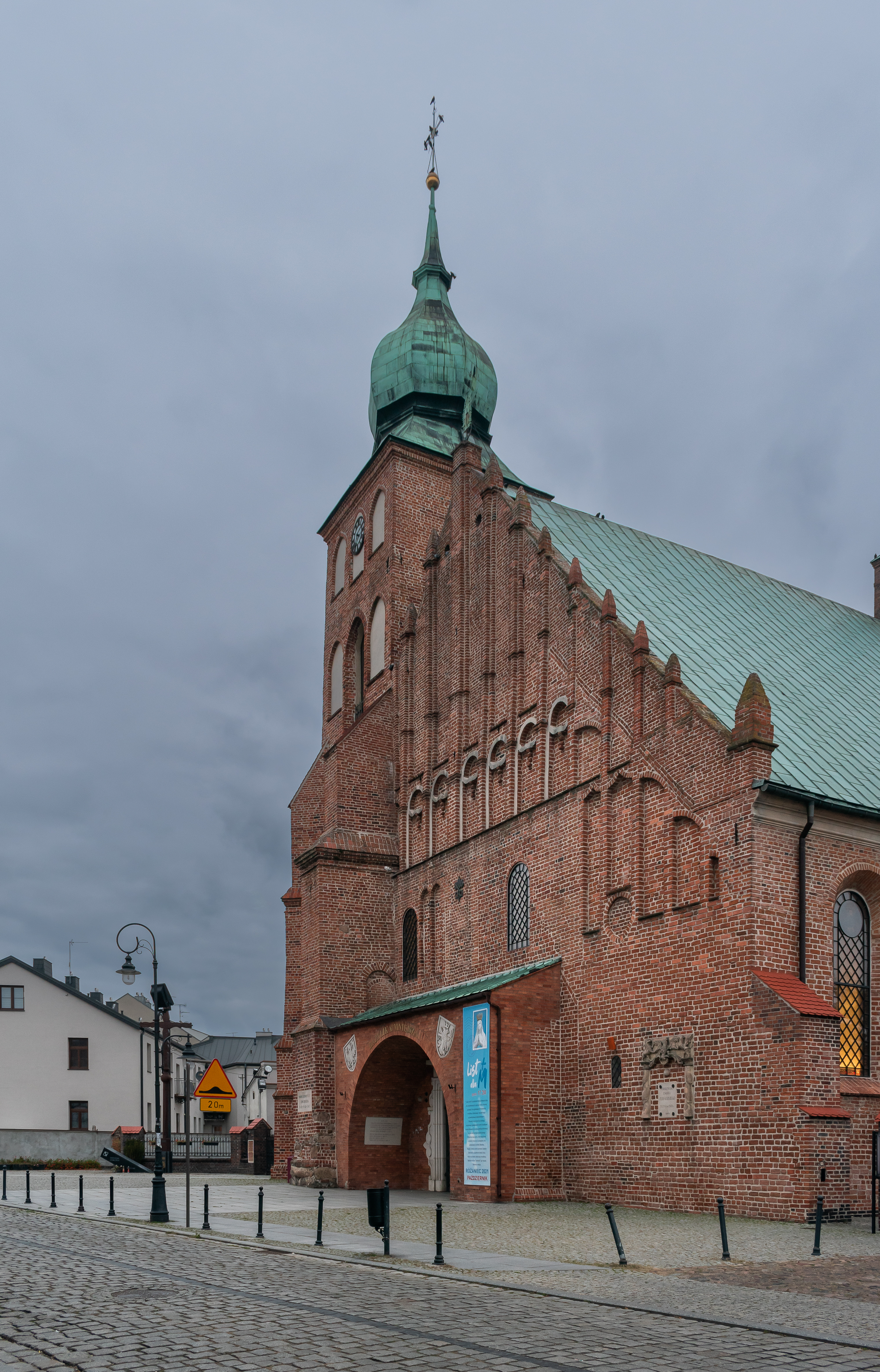
Collegiate Church, 14th century

The oldest settlements can be roughly traced back to the 6th century. The oldest known mention of Sieradz comes from the Bull of Gniezno from 1136. In the mid-13th century it was conferred with municipal rights by Duke Casimir I of Kuyavia. It had also welcomed many settlers from Scotland and the Netherlands after the 13th century. During the fragmentation of Poland, Sieradz was initially part of the Seniorate Province, and then from 1263 it was the capital of the Duchy of Sieradz, which in 1339 was transformed into the Sieradz Voivodeship of Poland. Polish king Casimir III the Great erected a castle in Sieradz. In the Middle Ages the town was attacked by the Mongols during all three Mongol invasions of Poland, Bohemians and Teutonic Knights.

Sieradz was a significant royal town of Poland. In 1445 the election of King Casimir IV Jagiellon took place in Sieradz. Until the 16th century the town used to be an important trade centre. Merchants from Spain and Portugal were frequently visiting the town for trade and commerce. In the 17th century due to the Swedish invasions, plagues, fires and floods the town lost its trading importance and fell from its prime. In the 18th century the reconstruction of town commenced. The residents during that time were only approximately 1,500.

Sieradz was annexed by Prussia in the Second Partition of Poland in 1793. On 13 November 1806 a Polish uprising against the Prussians took place in Sieradz, and in 1807 it was included in the short-lived Polish Duchy of Warsaw. After the duchy's dissolution, in 1815, it became part of so-called Congress Poland within the Russian Partition of Poland. It was the capital of a district within the Kalisz Governorate of the Russian Empire. During the January Uprising, on 18 September 1863, Polish insurgents attacked Russian troops stationed in the town. Further clashes between Polish insurgents and Russian troops took place on 24 January and 18 June 1864. After World War I, in 1918, Poland regained independence and control of the town.

=== World War II ===
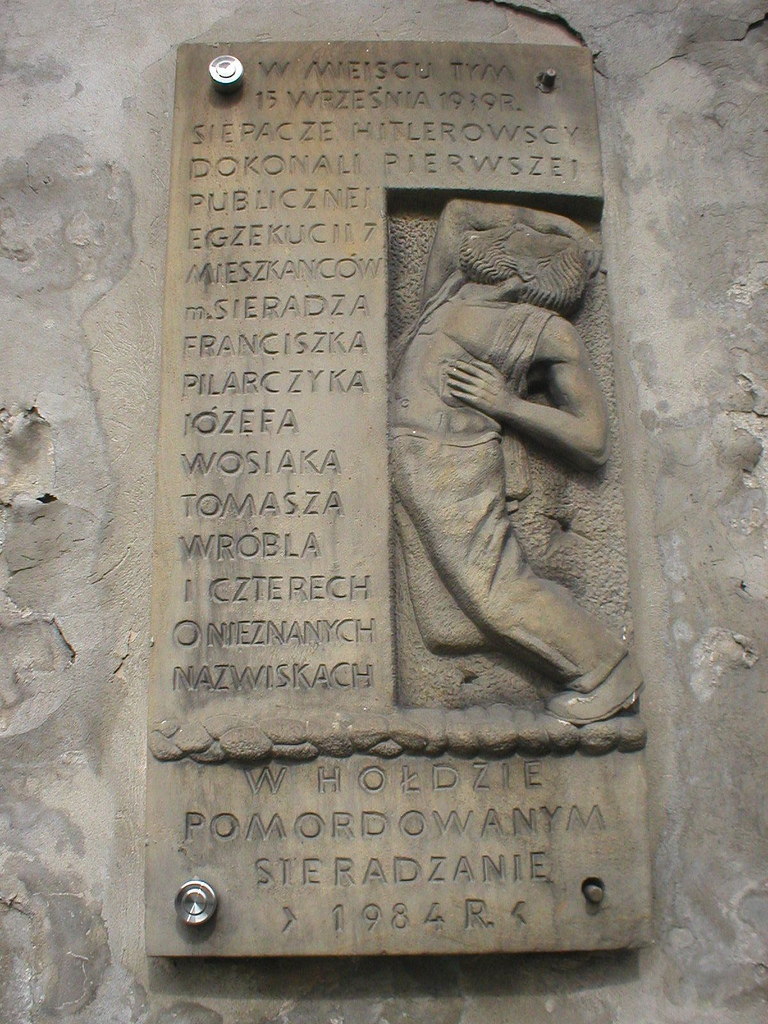
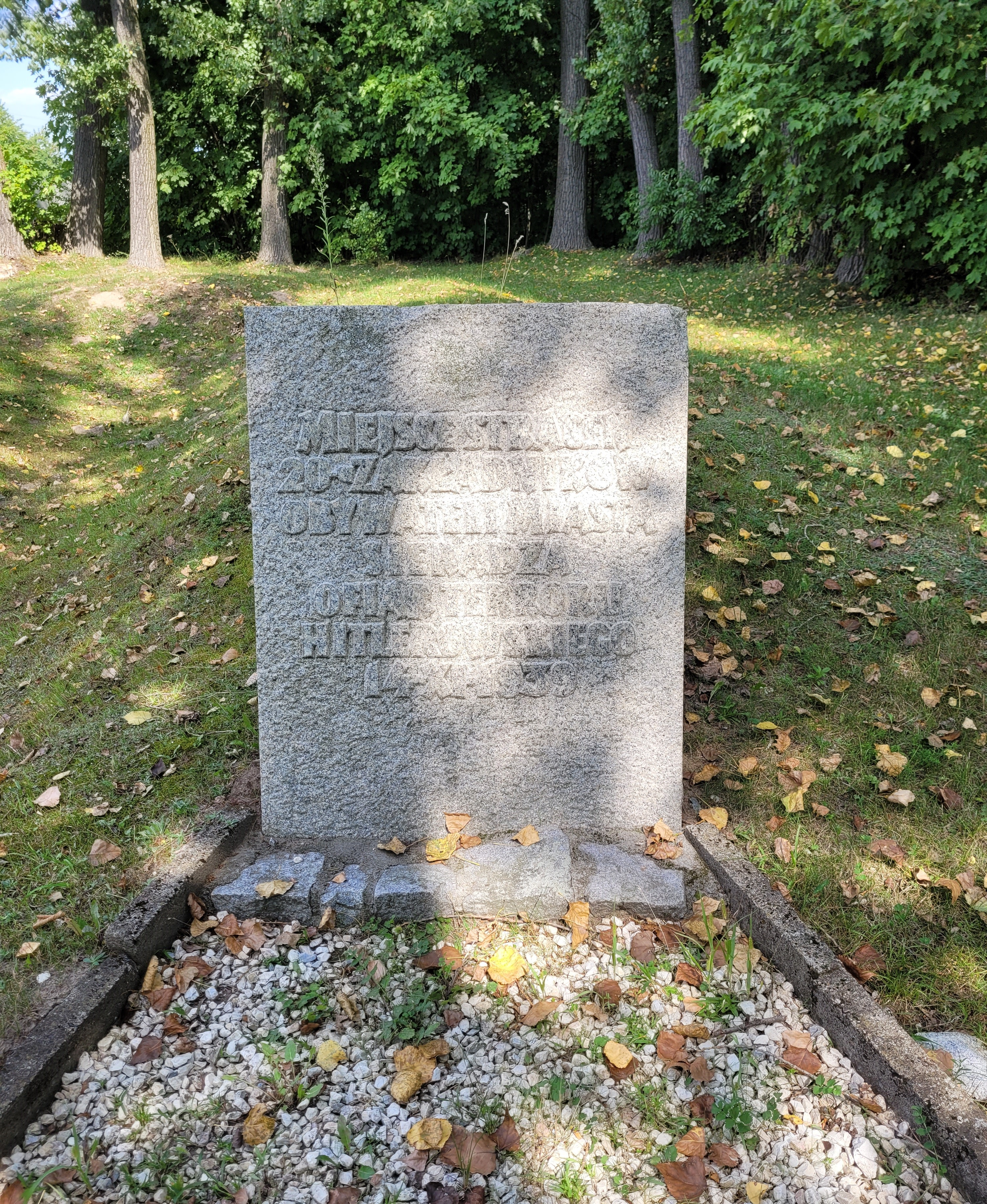
Memorials at the sites of executions of Poles, carried out by the Germans on 15 September and 14 November 1939

With the joint German-Soviet invasion of Poland and the outbreak of the Second World War in 1939, Sieradz was attacked on 9 September and occupied by the Wehrmacht. Annexed by Nazi Germany, it was renamed Schieratz and administered as part of the county or district (kreis) of the same name within Reichsgau Wartheland. Estimates are that at least 40% of the population of Sieradz was Jewish prior to the German occupation. Today, Sieradz commemorates a Day of Judaism each year in January.

In mid-September 1939, the Germans organized a temporary prisoner-of-war camp in the local prison, in which they held nearly 3,000 Polish soldiers, despite the prison capacity being 1,100. During the German occupation, the population was subjected to various atrocities. Already on 15 September 1939, the Germans carried out the first public execution of seven Poles in Sieradz. In early November 1939, the Germans arrested 62 members of the local elite in order to terrorize the population before the Polish Independence Day (11 November), and then on 14 November they forced local Jews to dig pits for the victims, and afterwards murdered 20 hostages. Among the victims were activists, teachers, school principals, craftsmen, policemen, pre-war mayor Ignacy Mąkowski, local officials, judges, and a boy scout. 522 Poles, families of teachers, officials, policemen, merchants, craftsmen and shop owners, were expelled in late 1939.

The town was subjected to severe Germanisation, and the Nazis destroyed traces of Polish culture, destroying historical records, monuments, and buildings. Street names were changed in an effort to wipe out any connection with a Polish identity. In 1941, the German gendarmerie carried out further expulsions of Poles from the present-day districts of Jeziory, Monice and Zapusta Mała, mostly due to the establishment of a military training ground, with the victims either deported to forced labour in Germany or to the Radom District in the more-eastern part of occupied Poland.

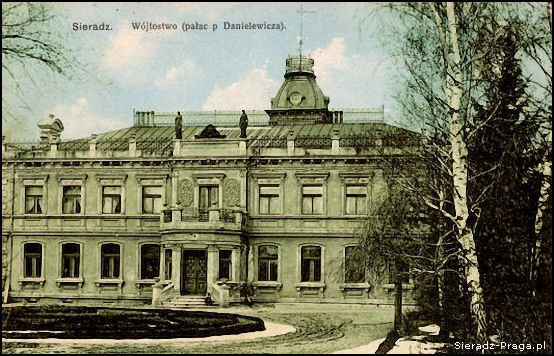
Pre-war view of the Danielewicz Palace, which was destroyed during World War II

The local prison was one of the most important German prisons in the Reichsgau Wartheland. Its prisoners, predominantly Poles and Jews, were subjected to insults, beatings, forced labour, tortures and executions. Prisoners were given very low food rations, and meals were even prepared from rotten vegetables, spoiled fish and dead dogs. Many prisoners died of exhaustion, starvation or torture. After the war, Polish historian Antoni Galiński was able to identify 968 people who died or were shot in the prison and its subcamps in 1940–1945, however the overall number of deaths is certainly higher. Despite such circumstances, the Polish resistance movement still operated in the area. The last executed prisoner was Antonina Chrystkowa, a female member of the Home Army resistance organization, who was beheaded with an axe on 18 January 1945. Another German prison was operated in the present-day district of Chabie; it was subordinate to the main prison in Sieradz.

Bombed by the Soviets, more than 100 residents were killed. After an assault lasting three days, the Red Army arrived on 23 January 1945. The day before the retreat of the Germans, the historic Danielewicz Palace was burned down. The town was restored to Poland, although with a Soviet-installed communist regime, which remained in power until the Fall of Communism in the 1980s.

=== Recent period ===
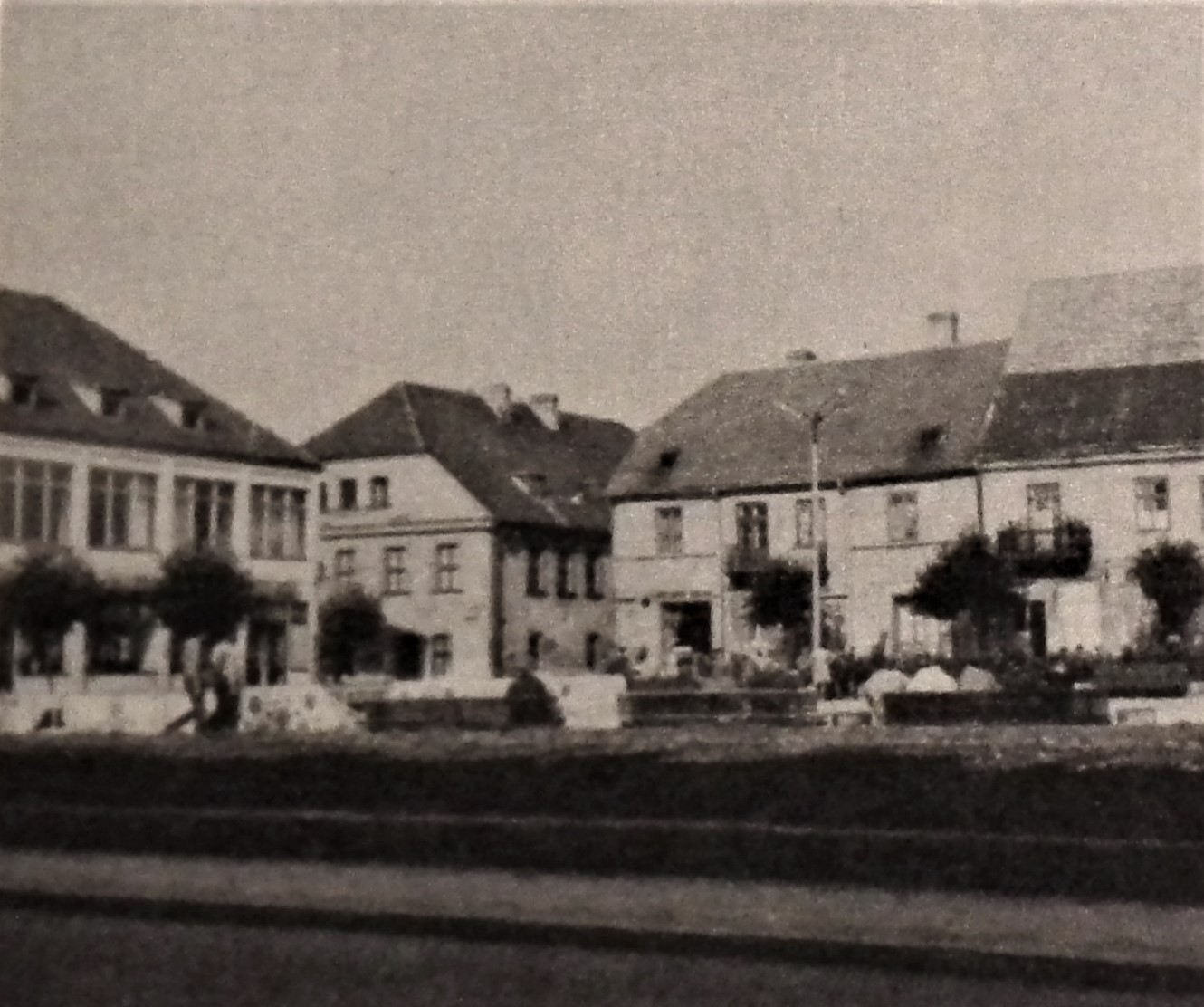
Market Square in the 1980s

In 1947, local Polish youth established a secret anti-communist resistance organization, initially called the Union of Patriotic Youth (Związek Młodzieży Patriotycznej), and in 1949 renamed to Katyń to commemorate the Katyn massacre in which the Soviets murdered nearly 22,000 Poles in 1940. Its activity extended to the nearby cities of Zduńska Wola, Warta, Łódź and even Włocławek, and included collecting weapons, secret training, intelligence, and publishing and distribution of independent Polish press and leaflets. Its leader was Zbigniew Tur, a native of pre-war eastern Poland annexed by the Soviet Union, who as a teenager was arrested and deported to forced labour by both the Germans (twice) and the Soviets, before returning to Poland in 1946. The organization was eventually crushed by the communists, who sentenced its members to 1.5 to 10 years in prison in 1951. During the court hearings, the townspeople gathered near the courthouse and demonstrated their sympathy and support for the arrested youth.

At the turn of the 1940s and 1950s, a hoard of 18 coins from the 17th and 18th centuries was found in the present-day neighbourhood of Monice. The coins are part of the collection of the Archaeological and Ethnographic Museum in Łódź.

Post-war economic activities included clothing manufacture, cereal-milling, spirit distillery, potato-farming and other agricultural activities. In 1957 the knitting plant "Sira" was founded. From 1975 to 1998 Sieradz was the capital of the Sieradz Voivodeship. In 1979, town limits were greatly expanded by including Męka-Jamy, Męka Księża, Mokre Wojsławskie, Woźniki-Kolonia, Zapusta Mała, and parts of the settlements of Dzigorzew, Herby, Jeziory, Kłocko, Męcka Wola, Męka, Monice, Smardzew, Wola Dzierlińska, Woźniki and Zapusta Wielka as new districts.

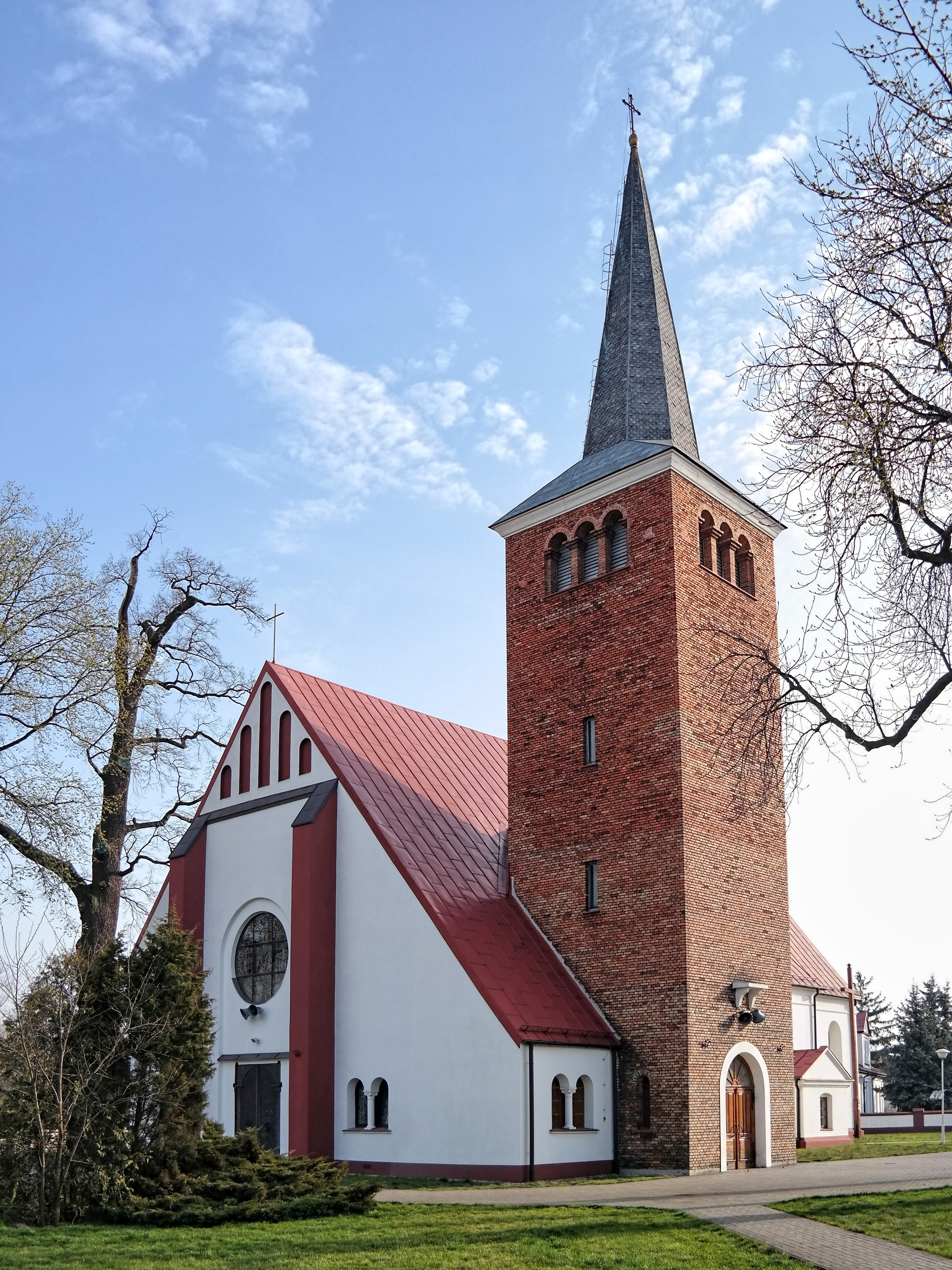
St. Adalbert Church

== Politics ==
=== Sieradz constituency ===
Members of Parliament (Sejm) elected from Sieradz constituency

- Joanna Lichocka, PiS
- Marcin Przydacz, PiS
- Paweł Rychlik, PiS
- Piotr Polak, PiS
- Tadeusz Woźniak, PiS
- Marek Mauszewski, PiS
- Cezary Tomczyk, KO
- Agnieszka Hanajczyk, KO
- Krzysztof Habura, KO
- Paweł Bejda, TD
- Jolanta Zięba-Gzik, TD
- Paulina Matysiak, L

=== President of Sieradz ===
- Paweł Osiewała

== Tourism ==
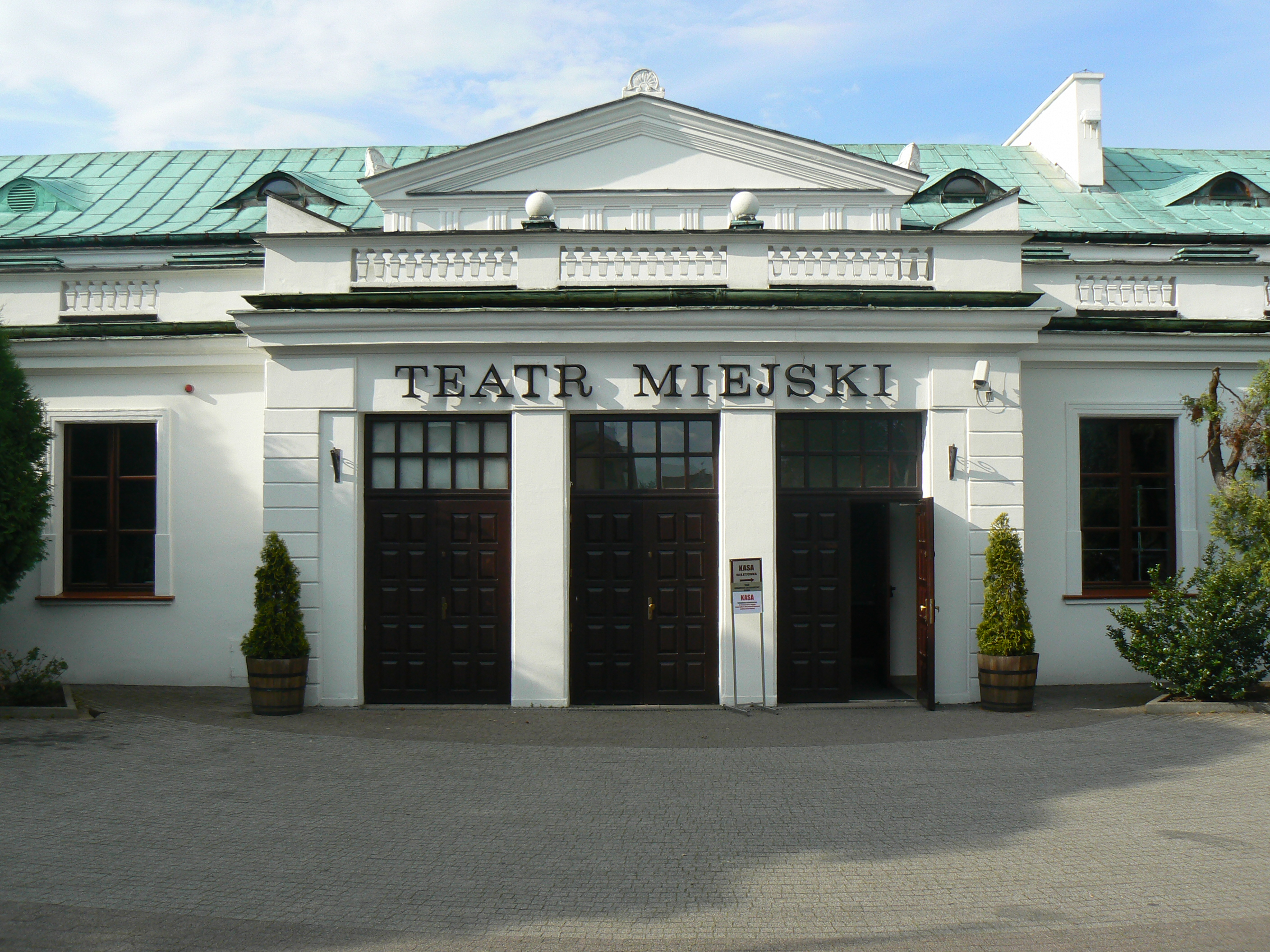
City Theatre

The Rynek (town square) filled with historic architecture makes a perfect tourism place with local shops selling various products of good quality and brands. Chief cultural institutions include the City Theatre and Regional Museum with archaeological, historical, ethnographic and art collections, with two additional branches: the Sieradz Ethnographic Park and Walewski Museum in Tubądzin. The medieval churches in Sieradz carry historical significance and are well restored with preserved Baroque interior and art by 19th-century painter Wojciech Gerson. There are several memorials to victims of German occupation in World War II, and three preserved war bunkers.

The natural forests on the banks of river Warta makes an ideal place for mushroom pickers.

== Sports and recreation ==
Sieradz has a fully equipped municipal sports centre, with three proper football pitches, running track, two sports grounds, hotel, restaurant, tennis courts, sauna, health club, games, swimming pool and well guarded river side swim area. The local football club is Warta Sieradz. It competes in the lower leagues.

== Development ==
Sieradz has dramatically developed since 2007 with new residential projects and townships. Sieradz has some attractive shopping malls, such as Galeria sieradzka, Dekada, Rondo and several open markets. It attracts residents from nearby villages and towns as well and makes Sieradz a prime shopping destination. The Sieradz city administration successfully holds the Open Hair Festival every year, and the town is very well known for this event.

== Notable people ==
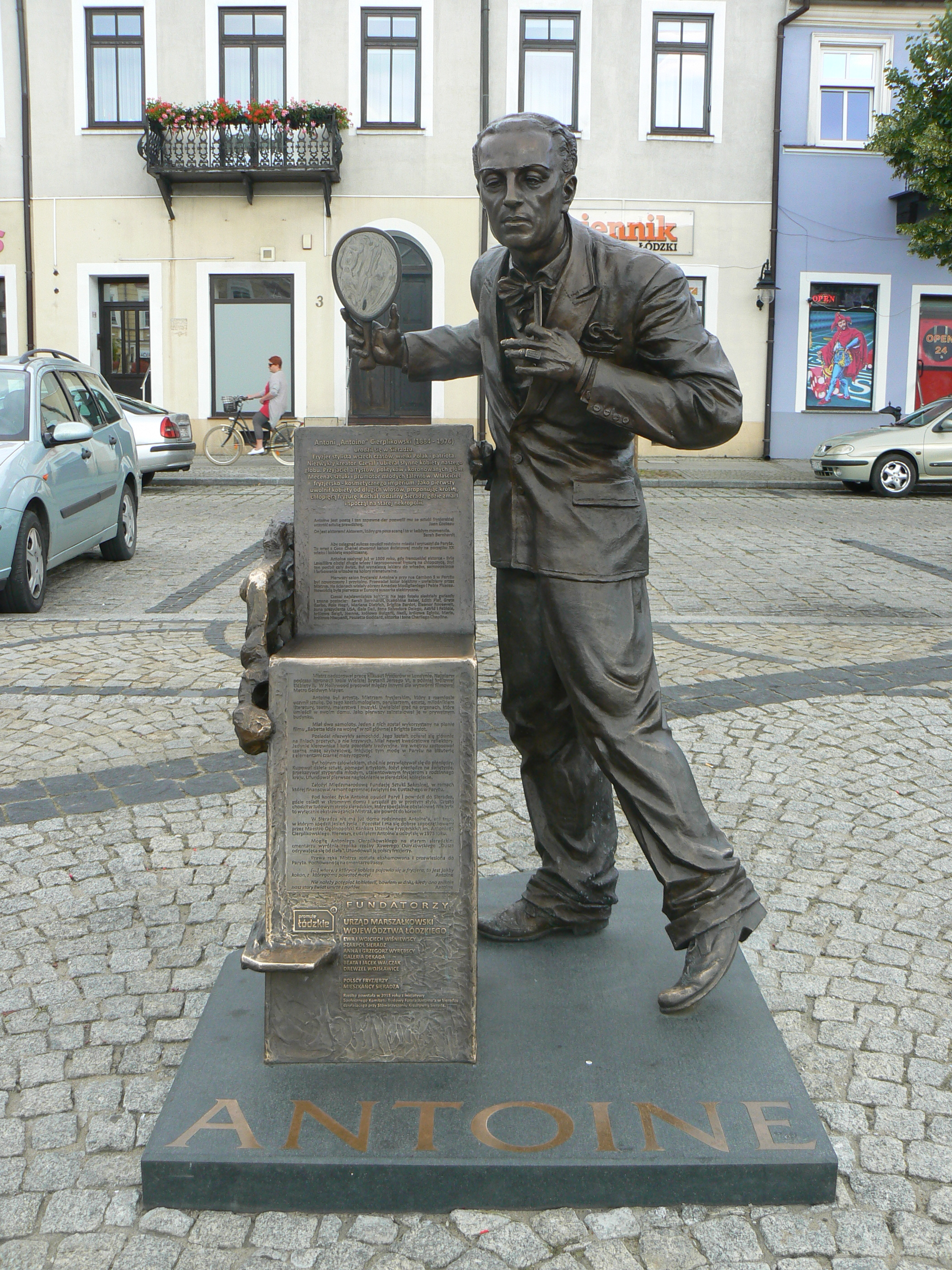
Antoine de Paris monument

- Cyprian Bazylik (c. 1535–c. 1600), musician, writer, printer
- Leszek II the Black (c. 1240–1288), High Duke of Poland
- Antoni ”Antoine” Cierplikowski (1884–1976), celebrity hairdresser
- Maksymilian Fajans (1827–1890), artist, lithographer and photographer
- Jan Gruszczyński, a medieval Primate of Poland
- Arek Hersh, Holocaust survivor and educator
- Michał Kołodziejczak (born 1988), politician, founder of AGROunia
- Dina Shayevitsh (1891–1942?), Yiddish actress
- Mariusz Stępiński (born 1995), footballer
- Beata Stoczyńska (born 1961), diplomat
- Ary Szternfeld (1905–1980), aerospace scientist
- Hymie Weiss, American gangster
- Zalman Ben-Ya'akov (1897–1959), Israeli politician

== Twin cities ==
- Gaggenau, Germany
- Annemasse, France
- Yambol, Bulgaria

== See also ==
- Dukes of Sieradz-Łęczyca
- Nauczycielskie Kolegium Języków Obcych in Sieradz
