= Grzegorz Schreiber =

Polish politician

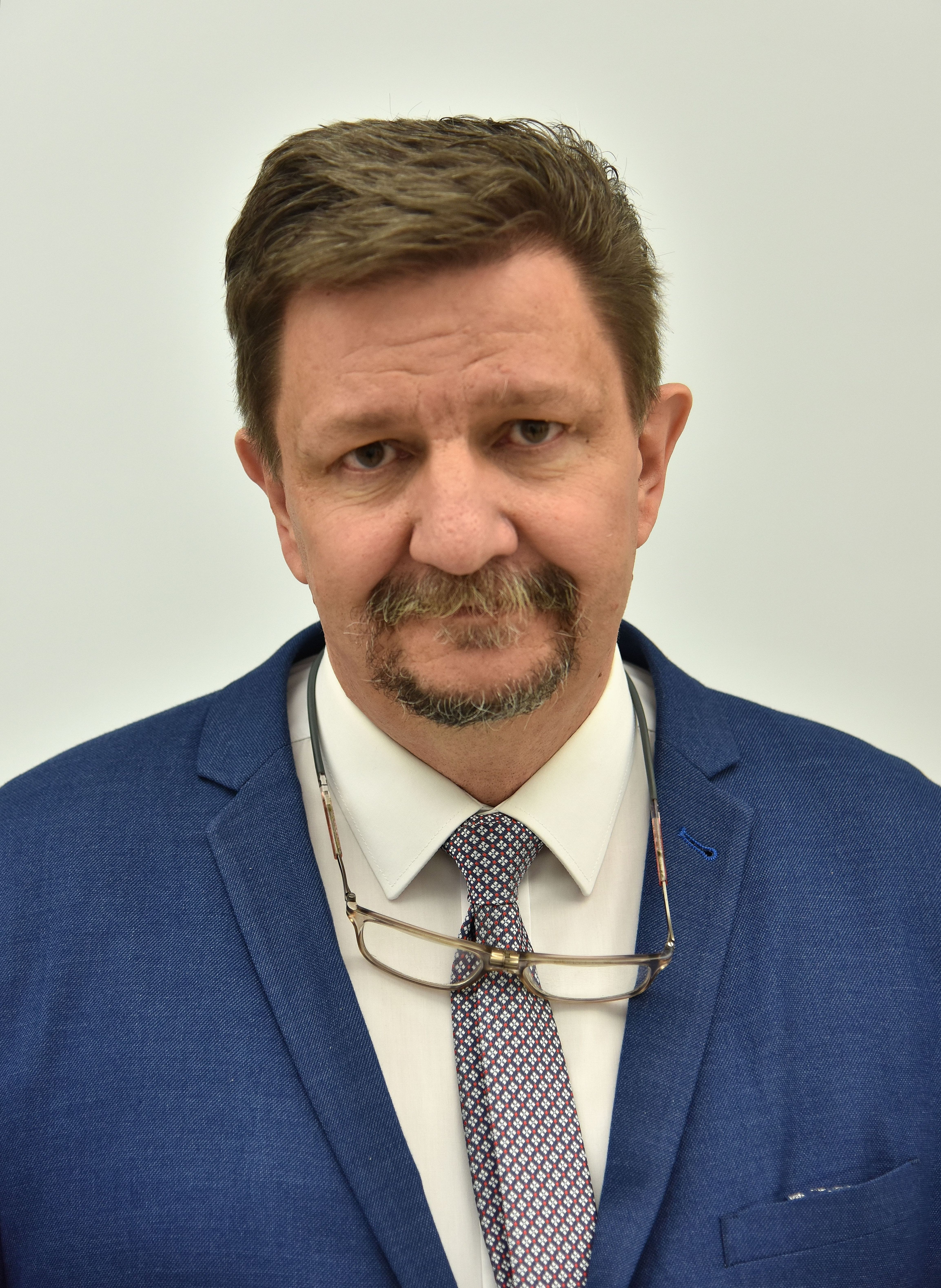

Sejm member
- In office 1991–1993; 1997 – 2001
- Constituency: Bydgoszcz

Sejm member
- In office 2011–2018
- Succeeded by: Paweł Rychlik
- Constituency: Sieradz

Łódź Voivodeship Marshal
- In office 2018–2024
- Preceded by: Witold Stępień
- Constituency: Łódź Voivodeship

Kuyavian-Pomeranian Regional Assembly Vice-Chairperson
- In office 2006–2010
- Preceded by: 2010

Member of Kuyavian-Pomeranian Regional Assembly from 1 district
- In office 2006–2010
- Constituency: Bydgoszcz

Vice-President (Vice-Mayor) of Bydgoszcz
- In office 1994–1995

Bydgoszcz City Councillors
- In office 2002–2006

Personal details
- Born: 14 February 1961 (age 65) Bydgoszcz, Poland
- Party: Law and Justice
- Profession: Politician, teacher

Grzegorz Zenon Schreiber (born 14 February 1961) is a Polish politician and until 2024 a Marshal of the Łódź Voivodeship. Between 1991 and 1993 he was Sejm member. He was a Bydgoszcz City Councillorlors also (2002–2006).

In 1986 he graduated philology in Pedagogical University (Polish: Wyższa Szkoła Pedagogiczna), current Kazimierz Wielki University in Bydgoszcz. Between 1987 and 1991 he worked as teacher in Primary School in Kotomierz. In 1991 he was a principal of 16th Primary School in Bydgoszcz. In 1990s he was the President of multi-sport club Polonia Bydgoszcz (BKS Polonia).

In 1991 parliamentary election he joined the Sejm of Poland (the lower house) I term representing the 17th district (Bydgoszcz), running on the Catholic Electoral Action list. In 1993 election he was not elected.

Between 1994 and 1995 he was a vice-president (=Vice-Mayor) of Bydgoszcz.

In 1997 parliamentary election he joined the Sejm of Poland again III term representing the 6th district (Bydgoszcz), running on the Solidarity Electoral Action list. In 2001 election he was not elected.

In 2002 local election he joined the Bydgoszcz City Council IV term representing the 3rd district. He polled 1,178 votes and was first on the Law and Justice list.

In January 2006 he was nominated as the Under-Secretary of State (podsekretarz stanu) in the Ministry of Sport of Poland in Cabinet of Kazimierz Marcinkiewicz

In 2006 local election he joined the Regional Assembly III term representing the 1st district. He scored 8,547 votes, running on the Law and Justice list. Assembly elected him as vice-chairperson of the Assembly (Wiceprzewodniczący Sejmiku Województwa Kujawsko-Pomorskiego).

In 2007 parliamentary election he candidated to the Sejm of Poland again. He polled 5,364 votes and was first candidate who was not elected from Law and Justice list in Bydgoszcz district.

After 2018 local election Grzegorz Schreiber was chosen by Łódź Regional Assembly to be a Łódź Voivodeship Marshal.

== See also ==
- Sejm of the Republic of Poland
- Kuyavian-Pomeranian Regional Assembly
