= Tomasz Rzymkowski =

Polish politician (born 1986)

Member of the Sejm
- Incumbent
- Assumed office 9 September 2025
- Preceded by: Marcin Przydacz
- Constituency: Sieradz
- In office 12 November 2015 – 12 November 2023
- Constituency: Sieradz

Personal details
- Born: 31 July 1986 (age 40)
- Party: Confederation Liberty and Independence

Tomasz Rzymkowski (born 31 July 1986) is a Polish politician. He has been a member of the Sejm since 2025, having previously served from 2015 to 2023. From 2021 to 2023, he served as deputy minister of education and science.
