= Marek Matuszewski =

Polish politician (born 1959)

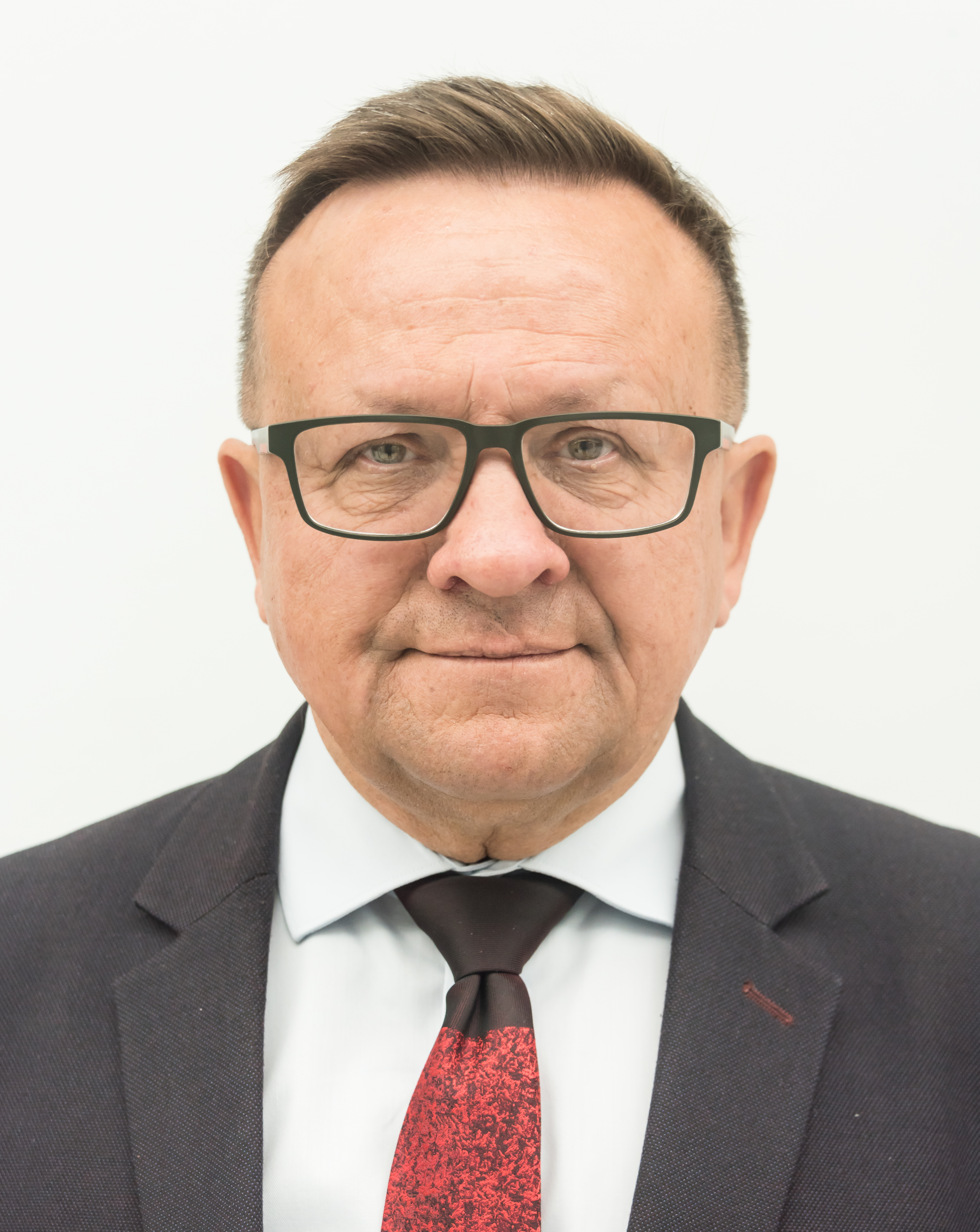

member of Sejm 2005-2007
- In office 25 September 2005 – ?

Personal details
- Born: 14 August 1959 (age 66)
- Party: Law and Justice

Marek Matuszewski (born 14 August 1959 in Zgierz) is a Polish politician. He was elected to the Sejm in the 2005 Polish parliamentary election, with 4806 votes in 11 Sieradz district, as a candidate from the Law and Justice list.

== See also ==
- Members of Polish Sejm 2005-2007
