= Tadeusz Woźniak =

Polish politician

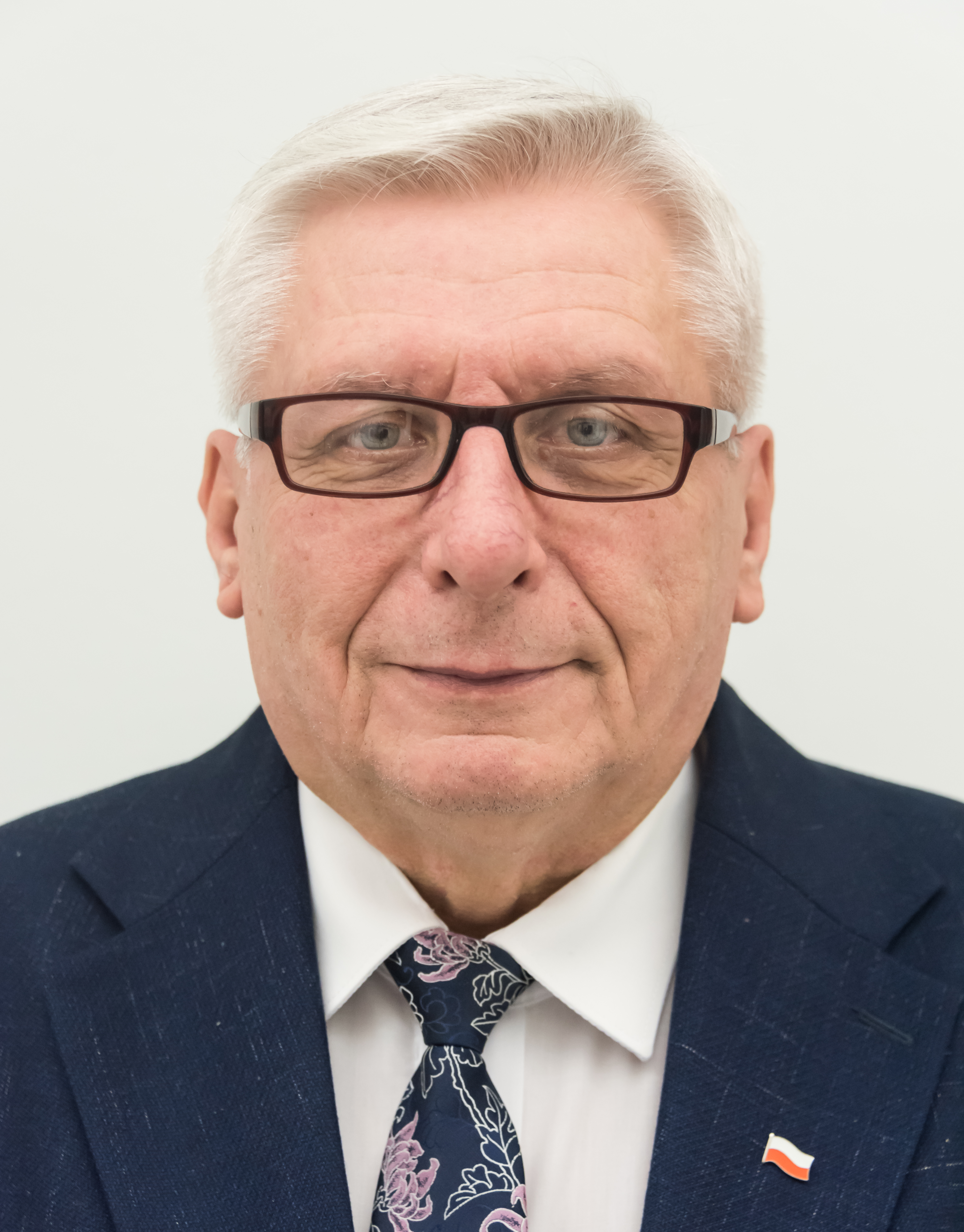

Member of the Sejm
- Incumbent
- Assumed office 25 September 2005
- Constituency: 5 – Toruń

Personal details
- Born: 1960 (age 65–66) Kutno, Poland
- Party: United Poland
- Other political affiliations: Law and Justice (2005–12)

Tadeusz Jacek Woźniak (born 15 January 1960 in Kutno) is a Polish politician. He was first elected to Sejm on 25 September 2005, getting 5396 votes in 11 – Sieradz district as a candidate from the Law and Justice (PiS) list. On 4 November 2011 he, along with 15 other supporters of the dismissed PiS MEP Zbigniew Ziobro, left Law and Justice on ideological grounds to form a breakaway group, United Poland.

== See also ==
- Members of Polish Sejm 2005-07
- Members of Polish Sejm 2007-11
