= Paweł Rychlik =

Polish politician (born 1986)

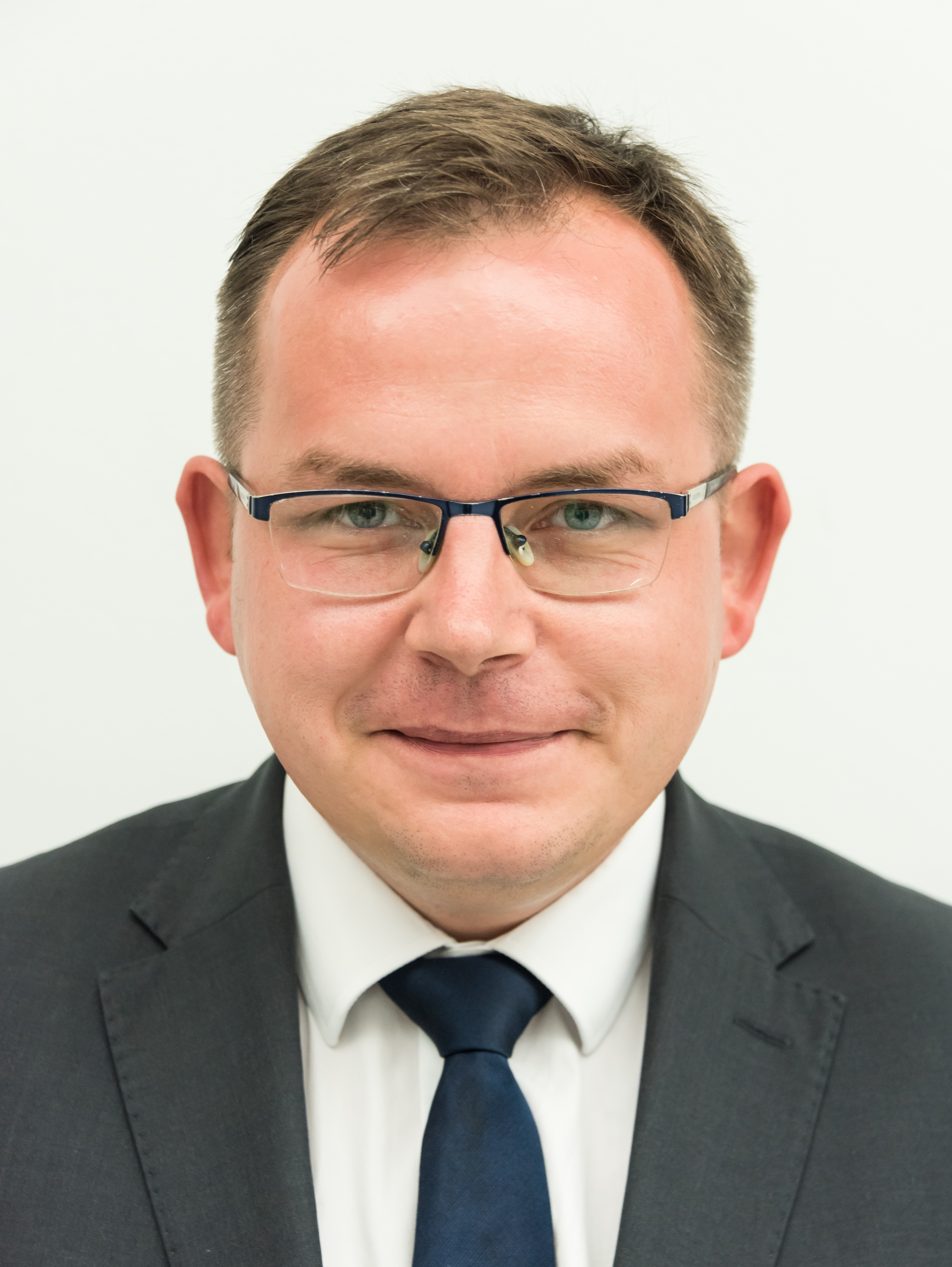
- Rychlik in 2023

Member of the Sejm
- Incumbent
- Assumed office 5 December 2018
- Preceded by: Grzegorz Schreiber
- Constituency: Sieradz

Personal details
- Born: 16 December 1986 (age 39)
- Party: Law and Justice

Paweł Rychlik (born 16 December 1986) is a Polish politician serving as a member of the Sejm since 2018. From 2014 to 2018, he was a councillor of Wieluń County.
