= Jolanta Zięba-Gzik =

Polish politician (born 1975)

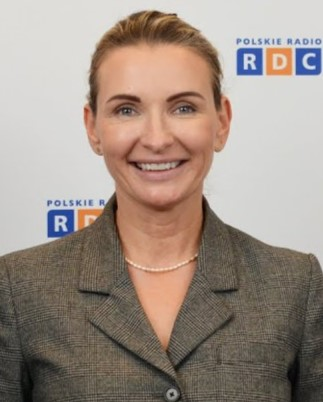

Member of the Sejm
- Incumbent
- Assumed office 15 October 2023
- Constituency: Sieradz

Personal details
- Born: 13 October 1975 (age 50)
- Party: Polish People's Party
- Other political affiliations: Third Way

Jolanta Zięba-Gzik (born 13 October 1975) is a Polish politician of the Polish People's Party. Since 2023, she has been a member of the Sejm. She has been a member of the executive board of Łódź Voivodeship since 2015, and was the lead candidate of the Third Way in Łódź in the 2024 European Parliament election.
