= Joanna Lichocka =

Polish politician (born 1969)

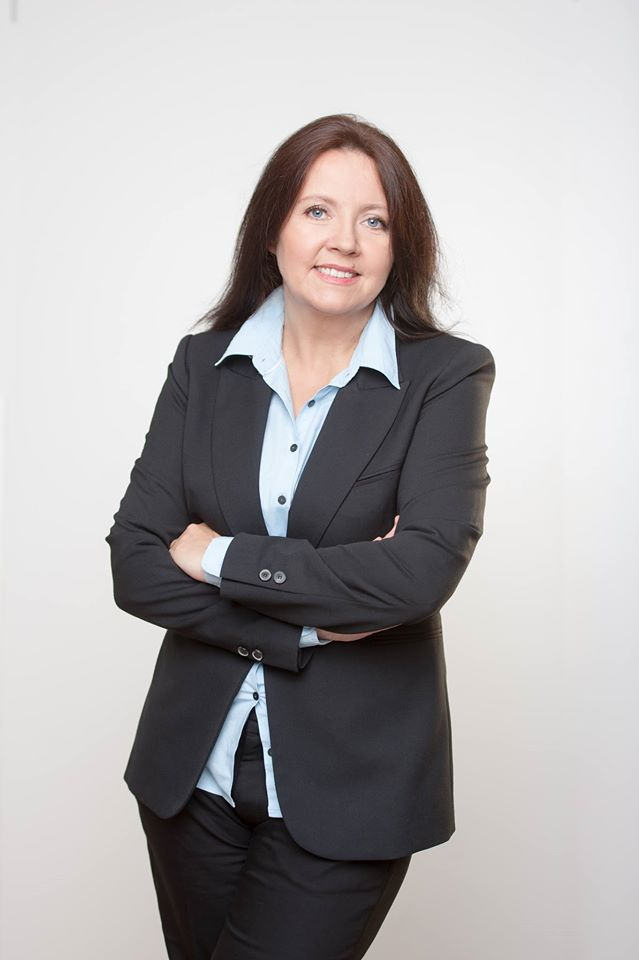
- Lichocka in 2015

Member of the Sejm
- Incumbent
- Assumed office 12 November 2015
- Constituency: Kalisz (2015–2019); Sieradz (2019–present)

Personal details
- Born: 21 November 1969 (age 56)
- Party: Law and Justice

Joanna Katarzyna Lichocka (born 21 November 1969) is a Polish journalist and politician serving as a member of the Sejm since 2015. She has been member of the National Media Council since 2016.
