= Marcin Przydacz =

Polish politician (born 1985)

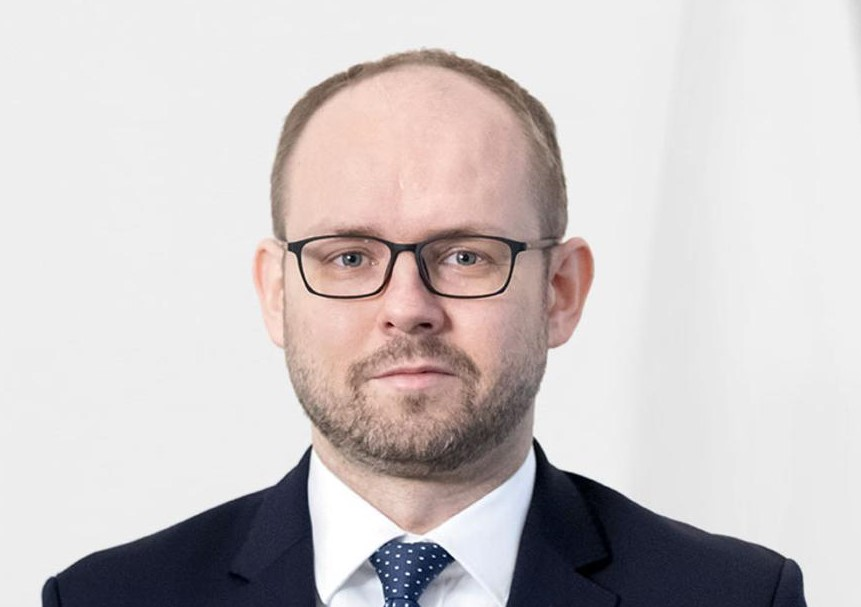
- Przydacz in 2020

Member of the Sejm
- Incumbent
- Assumed office 15 October 2023
- Constituency: Sieradz

Personal details
- Born: 26 June 1985 (age 40)
- Party: Law and Justice

Marcin Paweł Przydacz (born 26 June 1985) is a Polish politician of Law and Justice who was elected member of the Sejm in 2023. From 2019 to 2023, he served as deputy minister of foreign affairs.
