= Paweł Bejda =

Polish politician (born 1962)

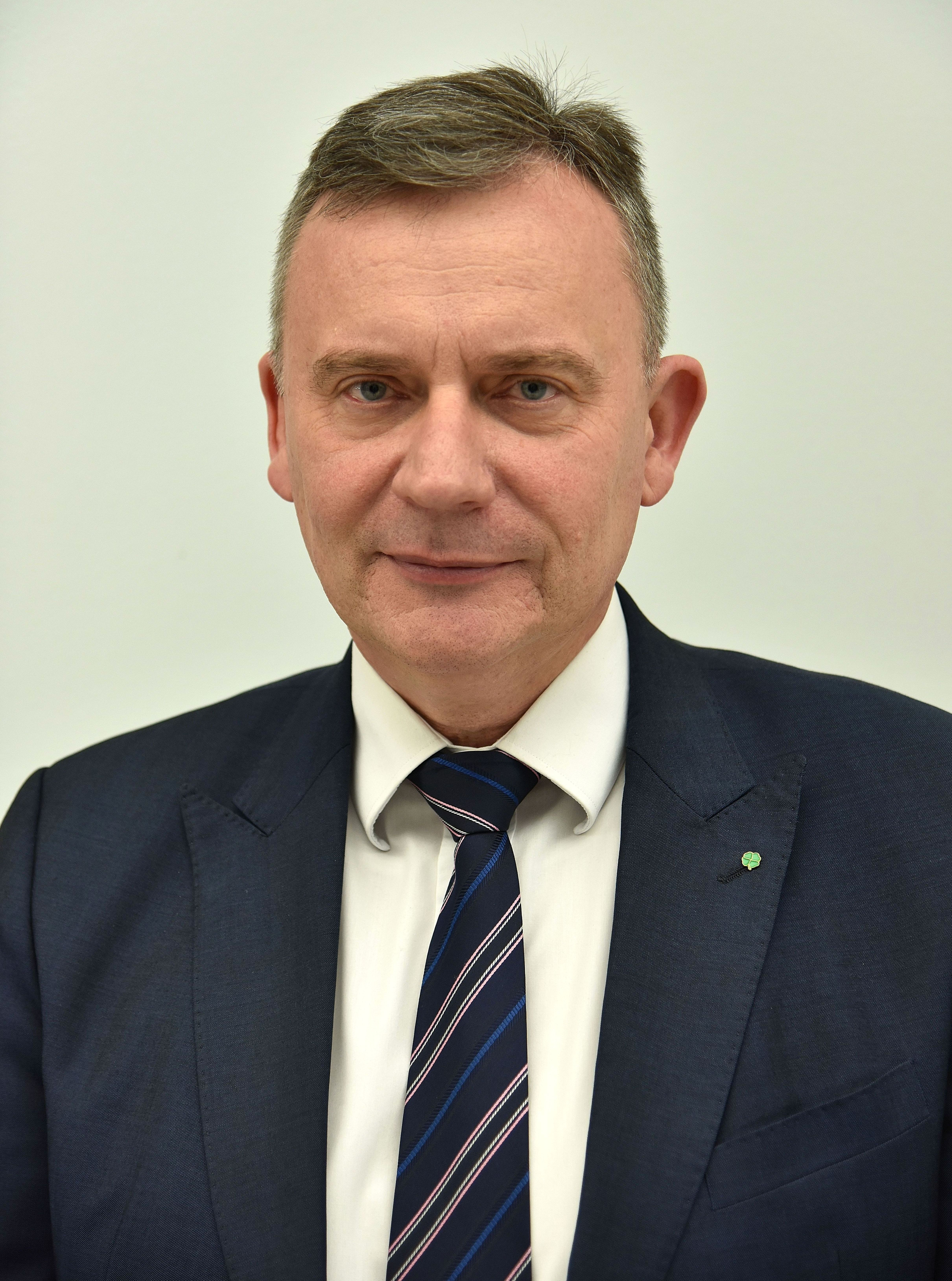
- Polish MP Paweł Bejda in the Sejm, May 2016. Adrian Grycuk photo.
- Born: 13 October 1962 (age 63); Łowicz, Poland
- Education: Academy of Agriculture and Technology, Olsztyn; Lodz University of Technology
- Occupations: engineer, politician
- Political party: PSL
- Father: Władysław Bejda, Esperantist

Paweł Jan Bejda (born 13 October 1962 in Łowicz) is a Polish politician. From 2015 he has served as a member of the Sejm, the lower house of the Polish parliament. Previously, from 2012 through 2014, he had been the appointed deputy governor of one of Poland’s 16 provinces, the central voivodeship of Łódź.

== Education ==
Bejda graduated as a mechanical engineer (1987) from Michał Oczapowski Academy of Agriculture and Technology (Akademia Rolniczo-Techniczna, now merged into the University of Warmia and Mazury in Olsztyn). He also completed post-graduate managerial studies (2001) at the Lodz University of Technology (Politechnika Łódzka), and took further courses in real estate and property management (2009) at the Jarosław Dąbrowski Military Technical Academy (Wojskowa Akademia Techniczna) in Warsaw, subsequently becoming professionally licensed in both areas.

== Work and political career ==
In 1988 Bejda began working at the State Machine Centre (Państwowy Ośrodek Maszynowy) in Łowicz. From 1990 to 1991, he was deputy manager of the Łowiczanka services co-op (WUSP) in Poznań; that enterprise makes a range of products that include brushes, abrasive polishing disks, carpentry chisels, steel lamp posts and traffic lights. For the next ten years he held managerial positions in private companies, first for Tarbej and later for Promyk.

From 2002 to 2006 Bejda was deputy mayor of Łowicz. In 2007 he became director of the Skierniewice county road traffic centre. In 2006 and again in 2010 he was elected as a Łowicz county councillor. On 25 April 2012 he relinquished this post as the Polish central government, on the nomination of governor Jolanta Chełmińska, appointed Bejda as Lodz’s deputy governor.

In 2014 he was elected as a regional assemblyman for Łódź, and on 1 December that year, on a 19–13 vote, the regional assembly chose him as one of five members of the Łódź voivodeship executive board.

On 25 October 2015 he took part in the parliamentary elections, heading the centre-right Polish People's Party's list of candidates in the 11th electoral district (Sieradz). Having received 7.86 percent of the votes, his party was entitled, by the D'Hondt method of allocating proportional representation seats, to one of Sieradz's 12 seats — a seat which Bejda, as the member of his party list with the most votes (6,283), currently holds in the Sejm.

== Esperanto activities ==
In 2009 Bejda supported publication by the Łowicz county council office, the Starostwo, of Eltondu Łowicz-Teron, an Esperanto-language promotional report about the region, co-translated by Bejda and Eduardo Kozyra. Its publication was facilitated by the fact that the Łowicz Esperanto group included prominent citizens such as his father Władysław Bejda, as well as Dr. Stephen Brzozowski and Maria Wawrzyniec Rostworowski, a priest in the Old Catholic Mariavite Church whose father was a bishop in that church. (The Mariavites had accepted the marriage of clergy and the ordination of women.)

In 2014, again thanks to Paweł Bejda, Jolanta Chełmońska, the governor of the Łódź voivodeship, sponsored a month-long Senate Esperanto exhibition in Łowicz, and deputy governor Bejda participated in the exhibition’s subsequent vernissage on 15 August 2014 to place it in the permanent collection at the loft gallery of the Łowicz Cultural Centre; Łowicz mayor Krzysztof Kaliński was another distinguished guest. The exhibition featured a display of Esperanto books and magazines, along with photographs and Polish-language museum signage depicting the main principles of Esperanto grammar and supplying information on the life of Ludwik Zamenhof, the creator of Esperanto. Eduardo Kozyra led several free five-day workshops teaching the basics of Esperanto, and Irena Grochowska performed Doktor Esperanto, a dramatic monologue by Mario Migliucci portraying the life of Dr. Zamenhof. During the vernissage Bejda praised the Esperanto movement, mentioning that his father was an Esperantist and that as a child his father, Władysław Bejda, had first read to him the great epic poem Pan Tadeusz — not in the original Polish but in Antoni Grabowski's Esperanto translation.

Before the October 2015 Polish parliamentary elections, the Polish branch of Europe–Democracy–Esperanto (EDE-Poland), an electoral list that has participated in three European Parliament elections (2004, 2009 and 2014) called for Polish Esperantists to vote for candidates belonging to the Parlamenta Grupo Apoganta Esperanton (parliamentary group supporting Esperanto, PGAE) — a group of 15 elected Polish deputies and senators — and 12 other named candidates said to speak Esperanto or at least judged to be very favourable towards the language. Among those elected that year who had been named on this list was Paweł Bejda. After EDE-Poland's executive board formally congratulated him on his election to the Polish Sejm, Bejda invited EDE's president, Eduardo Kozyra, to meet him in Łowicz. At the meeting he promised to help organize the PGAE caucus during his term of office.

After a popularity poll of its readers, the Dziennik Łódzki newspaper selected Paweł Bejda as its Łowicz district "Person of the Year" for 2015; he led a field of nine candidates its readers could vote for.
