= Cezary Tomczyk =

Polish politician (born 1984)

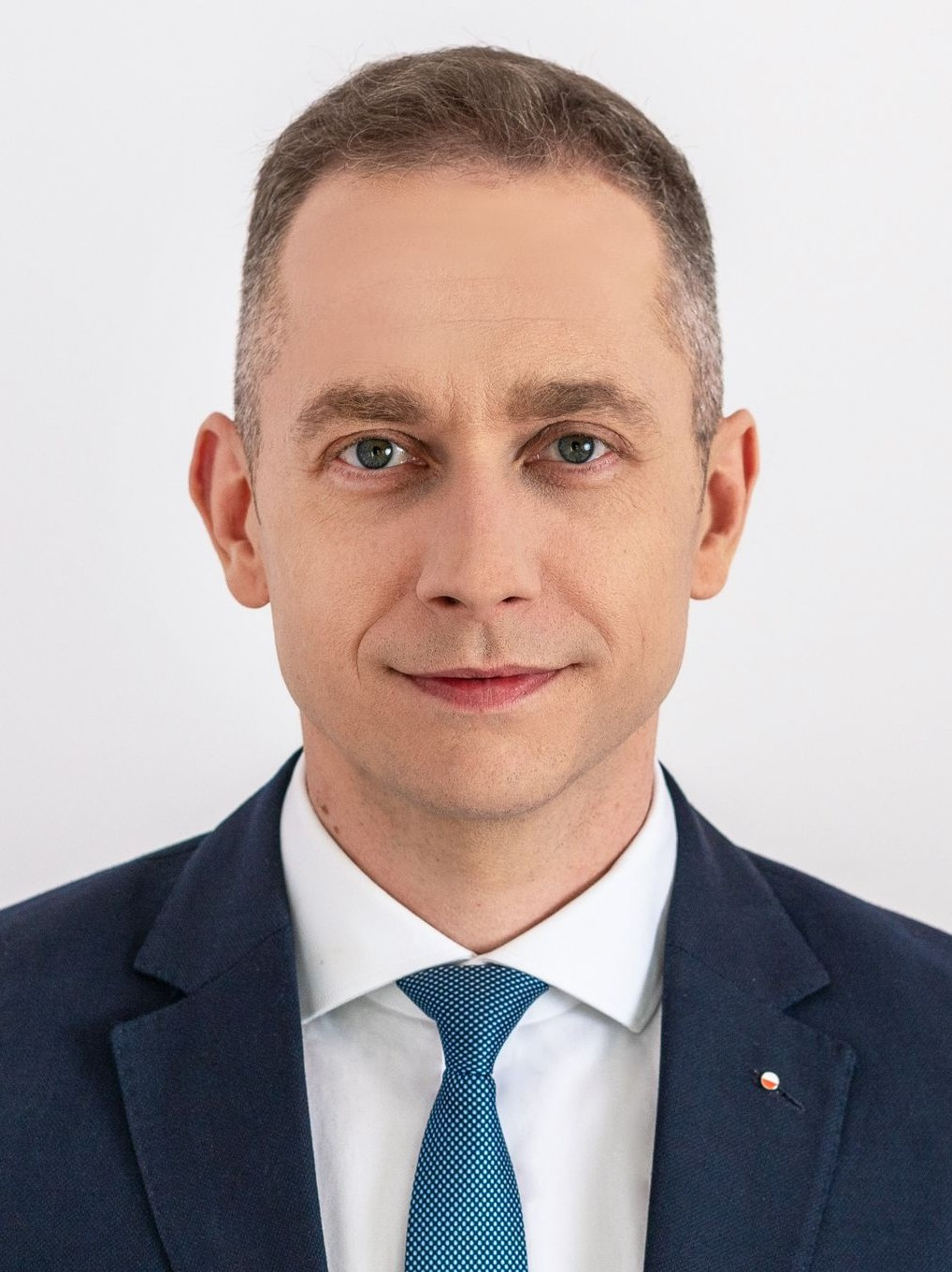
- Tomczyk in 2023

Member of the Sejm
- Incumbent
- Assumed office 5 November 2007
- Constituency: Sieradz

Personal details
- Born: 25 August 1984 (age 41)
- Party: Civic Platform

Cezary Józef Tomczyk (born 25 August 1984) is a Polish politician of the Civic Platform. He has been a member of the Sejm since 2007, and has served as secretary of state of the Ministry of National Defence since 2023. In 2015, he served as secretary of state of the Chancellery of the Prime Minister of Poland, and as spokesperson for the government of Ewa Kopacz. He was chief of staff to presidential candidate Rafał Trzaskowski in 2020, and served as group leader of the Civic Coalition in the Sejm from 2020 to 2021.
