= Sejm Constituency no. 19 =

Polish parliamentary constituency

Warsaw I
- Warszawa I
- Constituency for the Sejm
- Location of Warsaw I within Poland
- County: Warsaw City
- Province: Mazovia
- Population: 1,861,644 (2023)
- Electorate: 1,993,723 (2023) (Note: Includes electors living abroad or working aboard ships and oil rigs.)
- Area: 517 km^{2} (2022)

Current Constituency
- Created: 1991
- Seats: List: 20 (2011–present); 19 (2001–2011); 17 (1991–2001)
- Deputies: List: Władysław Teofil Bartoszewski (PSL); Andrzej Domański (KO); Aleksandra Gajewska (KO); Piotr Gliński (PiS); Małgorzata Gosiewska (PiS); Klaudia Jachira (Z); Marek Jakubiak (Kukiz); Sebastian Kaleta (SP); Bożenna Hołownia (PL2050); Katarzyna Lubnauer (KO); Dorota Łoboda (KO); Sławomir Mentzen (NN); Dorota Olko (NL); Ryszard Petru (C); Katarzyna Piekarska (KO); Marzena Rogucka (KO); Donald Tusk (KO); Adrian Zandberg (LR); Urszula Zielińska (Z); Anna Maria Żukowska (NL)
- Municipal council: Warsaw City Council
- Created from: List: Warsaw-Mokotów; Warsaw-Ochota; Warsaw-Praga-Północ; Warsaw-Praga-Południe; Warsaw-Śródmieście; Warsaw-Wola; Warsaw-Żoliborz

Warsaw I (Polish: Warszawa I), officially known as Constituency no. 19 (Polish: Okręg wyborczy nr 19), is one of the 41 constituencies of the Sejm, the lower house of the Parliament of Poland, the national legislature of Poland. The constituency was established as Constituency no. 1 (Polish: Okręg wyborczy nr 1) in 1991 following the re-organisation of constituencies across Poland. It was renamed Sejm Constituency no. 19 in 2001 following another nationwide re-organisation of constituencies. It is conterminous with the city of Warsaw. Electors living abroad or working aboard ships and oil rigs are included in this constituency. The constituency currently elects 20 of the 460 members of the Sejm using the open party-list proportional representation electoral system. At the 2023 parliamentary election it had 1,993,723 registered electors.

== History ==
The constituency of Warsaw I, officially Constituency no. 1, was established in June 1991 by the Electoral Ordinance to the Sejm of the Republic of Poland (Ordynacja wyborcza do Sejmu Rzeczypospolitej Polskiej). It consisted of the city (miasto) of Warsaw. It was renamed Constituency no. 19 in 2001.

== Electoral system ==
Warsaw I currently elects 20 of the 460 members of the Sejm using the open party-list proportional representation electoral system. Constituency seats are allocated using the D'Hondt method. Only lists that reach the 5% national threshold compete for constituency seats (8% for coalition lists). If the thresholds result in only one list qualifying to compete for seats, the threshold is reduced to 3% (5% for coalition lists). Lists representing national minorities are exempt from threshold requirements.

== Election results ==
=== Summary ===
Election	Left L / ZL / SLD / LiD / SLD-UP / SLD			Social Democracy SDPL / UP / RDS			Democrats PD / UW / UD			Civic Coalition KO / PO / KLD			Solidarity AWS / NSZZS			Third Way TD / KP / PSL			Self-Defence SRP / ND / SRP / PS / S-L / SR			United Right ZP / PiS / PC / POC			Confederation KWN / KORWiN / NP		
Election	Votes	%	Seats	Votes	%	Seats	Votes	%	Seats	Votes	%	Seats	Votes	%	Seats	Votes	%	Seats	Votes	%	Seats	Votes	%	Seats	Votes	%	Seats
2023	230,648	13.45%	3							741,286	43.23%	9				227,127	13.25%	3				345,380	20.14%	4	124,220	7.24%	1
2019	251,434	18.19%	3							581,077	42.05%	9				65,683	4.75%	1				379,880	27.49%	6	103,843	7.51%	1
2015	93,666	8.55%	0							301,672	27.54%	7				7,882	0.72%	0				327,342	29.89%	8	67,700	6.18%	0
2011	78,020	7.67%	1							498,599	49.00%	11				17,755	1.74%	0				277,577	27.28%	6			
2007	145,072	12.66%	2							618,942	54.01%	11				26,678	2.33%	0	4,540	0.40%	0	316,977	27.66%	6			
2005	87,477	11.53%	3	49,361	6.50%	0	37,262	4.91%	0	250,981	33.07%	8				7,098	0.94%	0	17,771	2.34%	0	227,153	29.93%	7			
2001	270,062	36.77%	8				48,296	6.58%	0	138,636	18.87%	4	29,497	4.02%	0	11,910	1.62%	0	22,398	3.05%	0	158,426	21.57%	5			
1997	205,955	25.90%	5	39,607	4.98%	0	172,823	21.73%	4				253,539	31.88%	6	7,451	0.94%	0	223	0.03%	0						
1993	177,788	22.37%	7	94,946	11.94%	3	133,790	16.83%	5	72,827	9.16%	2	26,981	3.39%	0	22,050	2.77%	0	8,831	1.11%	0	61,991	7.80%	0			
1991	95,666	13.30%	2	12,897	1.79%	1	135,789	18.88%	3	119,194	16.57%	3	10,429	1.45%	0	12,096	1.68%	0				102,804	14.29%	3			

(Excludes national list seats)

=== Detailed ===
List has reached relevant threshold and is entitled to compete for constituency seats.

==== 2020s ====
===== 2023 =====
Results of the 2023 parliamentary election held on 15 October 2023:

Party		List		Party						List		
Party		List		Votes per county			Total votes	%	Seats	Votes	%	Seats
Party		List		Warsaw	Over- seas	Ships	Total votes	%	Seats	Votes	%	Seats
Civic Platform	PO	Civic Coalition (Note: Coalition list)	KO	430,875	234,351	133	665,359	38.80%	4	741,286	43.23%	9
Modern	.N	Civic Coalition	KO	19,063	7,091	4	26,158	1.53%	1	741,286	43.23%	9
The Greens	Z	Civic Coalition	KO	15,680	9,958	4	25,642	1.50%	2	741,286	43.23%	9
Independent	Ind KO	Civic Coalition	KO	11,587	3,790	2	15,379	0.90%	1	741,286	43.23%	9
Polish Initiative	iPL	Civic Coalition	KO	6,627	2,120	1	8,748	0.51%	1	741,286	43.23%	9
Law and Justice	PiS	United Right	ZP	190,038	66,049	38	256,125	14.94%	2	345,380	20.14%	4
Kukiz'15	Kukiz	United Right	ZP	25,661	13,479	11	39,151	2.28%	1	345,380	20.14%	4
Sovereign Poland	SP	United Right	ZP	23,292	8,073	4	31,369	1.83%	1	345,380	20.14%	4
Independent	Ind ZP	United Right	ZP	13,755	4,975	5	18,735	1.09%	0	345,380	20.14%	4
Left Together	LR	The Left	L	81,610	47,589	24	129,223	7.54%	2	230,648	13.45%	3
New Left	NL	The Left	L	60,126	30,772	15	90,913	5.30%	1	230,648	13.45%	3
Independent	Ind L	The Left	L	5,343	3,478	2	8,823	0.51%	0	230,648	13.45%	3
Polish Socialist Party	PPS	The Left	L	1,037	650	2	1,689	0.10%	0	230,648	13.45%	3
Poland 2050	PL2050	Third Way	TD	91,809	40,632	37	132,478	7.73%	2	227,127	13.25%	3
Polish People's Party	PSL	Third Way	TD	34,259	13,000	12	47,271	2.76%	1	227,127	13.25%	3
Independent	Ind TD	Third Way	TD	29,194	14,850	6	44,050	2.57%	0	227,127	13.25%	3
Centre for Poland	CdP	Third Way	TD	2,483	844	1	3,328	0.19%	0	227,127	13.25%	3
New Hope	NN	Confederation	KWN	64,971	47,270	59	112,300	6.55%	1	124,220	7.24%	1
Confederation of the Polish Crown	KKP	Confederation	KWN	2,991	1,401	2	4,394	0.26%	0	124,220	7.24%	1
Independent	Ind KWN	Confederation	KWN	2,362	1,144	1	3,507	0.20%	0	124,220	7.24%	1
National Movement	RN	Confederation	KWN	1,687	899	1	2,587	0.15%	0	124,220	7.24%	1
Confederation Liberty and Independence	KWN	Confederation	KWN	1,072	360	0	1,432	0.08%	0	124,220	7.24%	1
Independent	Ind BS	Non-Partisan	BS	16,832	6,202	13	23,047	1.34%	0	23,450	1.37%	0
Social Interest	SI	Non-Partisan	BS	189	103	0	292	0.02%	0	23,450	1.37%	0
Good Movement	DR	Non-Partisan	BS	72	39	0	111	0.01%	0	23,450	1.37%	0
There is One Poland	PJJ	There is One Poland	PJJ	7,975	6,630	5	14,610	0.85%	0	22,608	1.32%	0
Independent	Ind PJJ	There is One Poland	PJJ	4,354	3,643	1	7,998	0.47%	0	22,608	1.32%	0
Valid votes				1,144,944	569,392	383	1,714,719	100.00%	20	1,714,719	100.00%	20
Blank votes				4,077	2,793	0	6,870	0.40%				
Rejected votes – other				3,562	2,488	6	6,056	0.35%				
Total polled				1,152,583	574,673	389	1,727,645	86.65%				
Registered electors				1,357,214	636,099	410	1,993,723					
Turnout				84.92%	90.34%	94.88%	86.65%					

The following candidates were elected: Władysław Teofil Bartoszewski (PSL), 34,563 votes; Andrzej Domański (PO), 6,848 votes; Aleksandra Gajewska (PO), 49,428 votes; Piotr Gliński (PiS), 135,339 votes; Małgorzata Gosiewska (PiS), 36,523 votes; Klaudia Jachira (Z), 9,172 votes; Marek Jakubiak (Kukiz), 39,151 votes; Sebastian Kaleta (SP), 31,369 votes; Michał Kobosko (PL2050), 61,452 votes; Dorota Łoboda (Ind KO), 10,510 votes; Katarzyna Lubnauer (.N), 22,529 votes; Sławomir Mentzen (NN), 101,269 votes; Dorota Olko (LR), 44,188 votes; Ryszard Petru (PL2050), 24,192 votes; Katarzyna Piekarska (iPL), 8,748 votes; Michał Szczerba (PO), 28,653 votes; Donald Tusk (PO), 538,634 votes; Adrian Zandberg (LR), 64,435 votes; Urszula Zielińska (Z), 16,470 votes; and Anna Maria Żukowska (NL), 38,426 votes.

==== 2010s ====
===== 2019 =====
Results of the 2019 parliamentary election held on 13 October 2019:

Party		List		Party						List		
Party		List		Votes per county			Total votes	%	Seats	Votes	%	Seats
Party		List		Warsaw	Over- seas	Ships	Total votes	%	Seats	Votes	%	Seats
Civic Platform	PO	Civic Coalition	KO	381,053	97,922	60	479,035	34.66%	4	581,077	42.05%	9
Independent	Ind KO	Civic Coalition	KO	49,008	14,936	10	63,954	4.63%	3	581,077	42.05%	9
Modern	.N	Civic Coalition	KO	23,077	7,469	6	30,552	2.21%	1	581,077	42.05%	9
Green Party	PZ	Civic Coalition	KO	5,473	2,062	1	7,536	0.55%	1	581,077	42.05%	9
Law and Justice	PiS	United Right	ZP	287,008	74,953	35	361,996	26.20%	6	379,880	27.49%	6
Independent	Ind ZP	United Right	ZP	11,384	2,555	1	13,940	1.01%	0	379,880	27.49%	6
Jarosław Gowin's Agreement	PJG	United Right	ZP	3,232	710	2	3,944	0.29%	0	379,880	27.49%	6
Left Together	LR	Left	L	126,866	45,136	15	172,017	12.45%	2	251,434	18.19%	3
Democratic Left Alliance	SLD	Left	L	21,394	6,896	2	28,292	2.05%	1	251,434	18.19%	3
Spring	W	Left	L	18,045	7,131	2	25,178	1.82%	0	251,434	18.19%	3
Independent	Ind L	Left	L	19,463	5,481	2	24,946	1.81%	0	251,434	18.19%	3
Your Movement	TR	Left	L	382	122	0	504	0.04%	0	251,434	18.19%	3
Polish Socialist Party	PPS	Left	L	303	194	0	497	0.04%	0	251,434	18.19%	3
Confederation Liberty and Independence	KWN	Confederation	KWN	45,652	24,348	19	70,019	5.07%	1	103,843	7.51%	1
Independent	Ind KWN	Confederation	KWN	17,652	9,286	3	26,941	1.95%	0	103,843	7.51%	1
National Movement	RN	Confederation	KWN	2,622	1,109	1	3,732	0.27%	0	103,843	7.51%	1
KORWiN	KORWiN	Confederation	KWN	2,115	1,036	0	3,151	0.23%	0	103,843	7.51%	1
Independent	Ind KP	Polish Coalition	KP	42,892	10,194	10	53,096	3.84%	1	65,683	4.75%	1
Polish People's Party	PSL	Polish Coalition	KP	8,322	2,361	3	10,686	0.77%	0	65,683	4.75%	1
Union of European Democrats	UED	Polish Coalition	KP	1,540	360	1	1,901	0.14%	0	65,683	4.75%	1
Valid votes				1,067,483	314,261	173	1,381,917	100.00%	20	1,381,917	100.00%	20
Blank votes				3,105	1,025	0	4,130	0.30%				
Rejected votes – other				2,602	874	0	3,476	0.25%				
Total polled				1,073,190	316,160	173	1,389,523	79.75%				
Registered electors				1,392,416	349,810	174	1,742,400					
Turnout				77.07%	90.38%	99.43%	79.75%					

The following candidates were elected: Władysław Teofil Bartoszewski (Ind KP), 30,405 votes; Magdalena Biejat (LR), 19,501 votes; Joanna Fabisiak (PO), 5,347 votes; Aleksandra Gajewska (PO), 10,228 votes; Małgorzata Gosiewska (PiS), 12,693 votes; Klaudia Jachira (Ind KO), 9,172 votes; Jarosław Kaczyński (PiS), 248,935 votes; Sebastian Kaleta (SP), 17,459 votes; Mariusz Kamiński (PiS), 19,797 votes; Małgorzata Kidawa-Błońska (PO), 416,030 votes; Janusz Korwin-Mikke (KWN), 60,385 votes; Jarosław Krajewski (PiS), 15,121 votes; Paweł Lisiecki (PiS), 13,093 votes; Katarzyna Lubnauer (.N), 28,205 votes; Katarzyna Piekarska (Ind KO), 8,780 votes; Dariusz Rosati (Ind KO), 25,061 votes; Michał Szczerba (PO), 13,747 votes; Adrian Zandberg (LR), 140,898 votes; Urszula Zielińska (PZ), 7,536 votes; and Anna Maria Żukowska (SLD), 38,426 votes.

===== 2015 =====
Results of the 2015 parliamentary election held on 25 October 2015:

Party		List		Party					List		
Party		List		Votes per county		Total votes	%	Seats	Votes	%	Seats
Party		List		Warsaw	Over- seas	Total votes	%	Seats	Votes	%	Seats
Law and Justice	PiS	United Right	ZP	241,640	61,439	303,079	27.67%	7	327,342	29.89%	8
Independent	Ind ZP	United Right	ZP	14,930	4,676	19,606	1.79%	1	327,342	29.89%	8
Right Wing of the Republic	PR	United Right	ZP	3,069	391	3,460	0.32%	0	327,342	29.89%	8
Poland Together United Right	PRZP	United Right	ZP	1,074	123	1,197	0.11%	0	327,342	29.89%	8
Civic Platform	PO	Civic Platform	PO	254,215	40,100	294,315	26.87%	6	301,672	27.54%	7
Independent	Ind PO	Civic Platform	PO	6,470	887	7,357	0.67%	1	301,672	27.54%	7
Modern	.N	Modern	.N	111,121	17,967	129,088	11.79%	1	146,629	13.39%	3
Independent	Ind .N	Modern	.N	15,153	2,388	17,541	1.60%	2	146,629	13.39%	3
Your Movement	TR	United Left	ZL	67,810	8,368	76,178	6.96%	0	93,666	8.55%	0
Democratic Left Alliance	SLD	United Left	ZL	11,042	949	11,991	1.09%	0	93,666	8.55%	0
Independent	Ind ZL	United Left	ZL	3,597	658	4,255	0.39%	0	93,666	8.55%	0
Green Party	PZ	United Left	ZL	929	246	1,175	0.11%	0	93,666	8.55%	0
Polish Socialist Party	PPS	United Left	ZL	61	6	67	0.01%	0	93,666	8.55%	0
Independent	Ind Kukiz	Kukiz'15	Kukiz	54,050	27,003	81,053	7.40%	1	84,937	7.76%	2
Congress of the New Right	KNP	Kukiz'15	Kukiz	1,854	566	2,420	0.22%	1	84,937	7.76%	2
National Movement	RN	Kukiz'15	Kukiz	693	290	983	0.09%	0	84,937	7.76%	2
Direct Democracy	DB	Kukiz'15	Kukiz	227	50	277	0.03%	0	84,937	7.76%	2
Libertarian Party	PL	Kukiz'15	Kukiz	170	34	204	0.02%	0	84,937	7.76%	2
KORWiN	KORWiN	KORWiN	KORWiN	38,081	20,974	59,055	5.39%	0	67,700	6.18%	0
Independent	Ind KORWiN	KORWiN	KORWiN	6,390	2,109	8,499	0.78%	0	67,700	6.18%	0
Libertarian Party	PL	KORWiN	KORWiN	68	20	88	0.01%	0	67,700	6.18%	0
Congress of the New Right	KNP	KORWiN	KORWiN	46	12	58	0.01%	0	67,700	6.18%	0
Together	R	Together	R	49,128	11,332	60,460	5.52%	0	60,663	5.54%	0
Independent	Ind R	Together	R	165	38	203	0.02%	0	60,663	5.54%	0
Polish People's Party	PSL	Polish People's Party	PSL	5,458	759	6,217	0.57%	0	7,882	0.72%	0
Independent	Ind PSL	Polish People's Party	PSL	1,471	194	1,665	0.15%	0	7,882	0.72%	0
Social Justice Movement	RSS	Social Movement	RSRP	2,466	239	2,705	0.25%	0	2,760	0.25%	0
Independent	Ind RSRP	Social Movement	RSRP	9	6	45	0.00%	0	2,760	0.25%	0
Freedom and Equality	WiR	Social Movement	RSRP	9	1	10	0.00%	0	2,760	0.25%	0
Independent	Ind WOP	Citizens	WOP	1,503	287	1,790	0.16%	0	1,964	0.18%	0
Democratic Party	SD	Citizens	WOP	124	31	155	0.01%	0	1,964	0.18%	0
Civic Platform	PO	Citizens	WOP	18	1	19	0.00%	0	1,964	0.18%	0
Valid votes				893,071	202,144	1,095,215	100.00%	20	1,095,215	100.00%	20
Blank votes				3,243	584	3,827	0.35%				
Rejected votes – other				5,489	898	6,387	0.58%				
Total polled				901,803	203,626	1,105,429	70.80%				
Registered electors				1,321,573	239,716	1,561,289					
Turnout				68.24%	84.94%	70.80%					

The following candidates were elected: Joanna Fabisiak (PO), 3,512 votes; Artur Górski (Ind ZP), 6,262 votes; Małgorzata Gosiewska (PiS), 13,976 votes; Zbigniew Gryglas (Ind .N), 1,011 votes; Andrzej Halicki (PO), 13,859 votes; Jarosław Kaczyński (PiS), 202,424 votes; Mariusz Kamiński (PiS), 29,654 votes; Joanna Kluzik-Rostkowska (PO), 12,807 votes; Ewa Kopacz (PO), 230,894 votes; Roman Kosecki (Ind PO), 3,258 voyes; Jarosław Krajewski (PiS), 4,753 votes; Paweł Kukiz (Ind), 76,675 votes; Paweł Lisiecki (PiS), 6,865 votes; Ryszard Petru (.N), 129,088 votes; Marcin Święcicki (PO), 8,329 votes; Michał Szczerba (PO), 4,919 votes; Ewa Tomaszewska (PiS), 5,114 votes; Jacek Wilk (KNP), 2,420 votes; Kornelia Wróblewska (Ind .N), 3,945 votes; and Małgorzata Wypych (Ind ZP), 7,496 votes.

===== 2011 =====
Results of the 2011 parliamentary election held on 9 October 2011:

Party		List		Party			List		
Party		List		Votes	%	Seats	Votes	%	Seats
Civic Platform	PO	Civic Platform	PO	485,091	47.67%	9	498,599	49.00%	11
Independent	Ind PO	Civic Platform	PO	13,508	1.33%	2	498,599	49.00%	11
Law and Justice	PiS	Law and Justice	PiS	265,356	26.08%	5	277,577	27.28%	6
Independent	Ind PiS	Law and Justice	PiS	11,931	1.17%	1	277,577	27.28%	6
Movement for Reconstruction of Poland	ROP	Law and Justice	PiS	290	0.03%	0	277,577	27.28%	6
Palikot's Movement	RP	Palikot's Movement	RP	99,697	9.80%	1	110,589	10.87%	2
Independent	Ind RP	Palikot's Movement	RP	10,414	1.02%	1	110,589	10.87%	2
Reason of the Polish Left	RACJA PL	Palikot's Movement	RP	478	0.05%	0	110,589	10.87%	2
Democratic Left Alliance	SLD	Democratic Left Alliance	SLD	62,875	6.18%	1	78,020	7.67%	1
Independent	Ind SLD	Democratic Left Alliance	SLD	11,879	1.17%	0	78,020	7.67%	1
Greens 2004	Z2004	Democratic Left Alliance	SLD	3,023	0.30%	0	78,020	7.67%	1
National Party of Retirees and Pensioners	KPEiR	Democratic Left Alliance	SLD	198	0.02%	0	78,020	7.67%	1
Labour Union	UP	Democratic Left Alliance	SLD	45	0.00%	0	78,020	7.67%	1
Poland Comes First	PJN	Poland Comes First	PJN	27,880	2.74%	0	30,964	3.04%	0
Independent	Ind PJN	Poland Comes First	PJN	2,701	0.27%	0	30,964	3.04%	0
Conservative People's Party	SKL	Poland Comes First	PJN	286	0.03%	0	30,964	3.04%	0
Democratic Party	SD	Poland Comes First	PJN	97	0.01%	0	30,964	3.04%	0
Independent	Ind PSL	Polish People's Party	PSL	11,815	1.16%	0	17,755	1.74%	0
Polish People's Party	PSL	Polish People's Party	PSL	5,940	0.58%	0	17,755	1.74%	0
Polish Labour Party - August 80	PPP	Polish Labour Party	PPP	2,631	0.26%	0	4,060	0.40%	0
Independent	Ind PPP	Polish Labour Party	PPP	1,429	0.14%	0	4,060	0.40%	0
Valid votes				1,017,564	100.00%	20	1,017,564	100.00%	20
Rejected votes				19,222	1.85%				
Total polled				1,036,786	69.44%				
Registered electors				1,493,055					

The following candidates were elected: Alicja Dąbrowska (PO), 4,622 votes; Joanna Fabisiak (PO), 6,739 votes; Artur Górski (Ind ZP), 4,762 votes; Małgorzata Gosiewska (PiS), 8,129 votes; Leszek Jastrzębski (PO), 3,075 votes; Jarosław Kaczyński (PiS), 202,297 votes; Ryszard Kalisz (SLD), 53,451 votes; Mariusz Kamiński (PiS), 17,535 votes; Małgorzata Kidawa-Błońska (PO), 45,027 votes; Marcin Kierwiński (PO), 3,580 votes; Roman Kosecki (Ind PO), 4,603 voyes; Ligia Krajewska (PO), 3,590 votes; Adam Kwiatkowski (PiS), 6,284 votes; Wanda Nowicka (Ind RP), 7,065 votes; Janusz Palikot (RP), 94,811 votes; Jacek Rostowski (PO), 10,743 votes; Marcin Święcicki (Ind PO), 6,246 votes; Michał Szczerba (PO), 4,137 votes; Donald Tusk (PO), 374,920 votes; and Przemysław Wipler (Ind PiS), 4,615 votes.

==== 2000s ====
===== 2007 =====
Results of the 2007 parliamentary election held on 21 October 2007:

Party		List		Party					List		
Party		List		Votes per county		Total votes	%	Seats	Votes	%	Seats
Party		List		Warsaw	Over- seas	Total votes	%	Seats	Votes	%	Seats
Civic Platform	PO	Civic Platform	PO	527,924	84,171	612,095	53.41%	10	618,942	54.01%	11
Independent	Ind PO	Civic Platform	PO	6,343	504	6,847	0.60%	1	618,942	54.01%	11
Law and Justice	PiS	Law and Justice	PiS	263,510	41,574	305,084	26.62%	4	316,977	27.66%	6
Independent	Ind PiS	Law and Justice	PiS	9,019	2,004	11,023	0.96%	2	316,977	27.66%	6
Movement for Reconstruction of Poland	ROP	Law and Justice	PiS	568	36	604	0.05%	0	316,977	27.66%	6
Organisation of the Polish Nation - Polish League	ONP-LP	Law and Justice	PiS	30	36	266	0.02%	0	316,977	27.66%	6
Social Democracy of Poland	SDPL	Left and Democrats	LiD	69,823	7,399	77,222	6.74%	1	145,072	12.66%	2
Democratic Left Alliance	SLD	Left and Democrats	LiD	59,121	4,436	63,557	5.55%	1	145,072	12.66%	2
Democratic Party – demokraci.pl	PD	Left and Democrats	LiD	3,641	436	4,077	0.36%	0	145,072	12.66%	2
Independent	Ind LiD	Left and Democrats	LiD	187	29	216	0.02%	0	145,072	12.66%	2
Independent	Ind PSL	Polish People's Party	PSL	11,122	931	12,053	1.05%	0	26,678	2.33%	0
Polish People's Party	PSL	Polish People's Party	PSL	10,053	718	10,771	0.94%	0	26,678	2.33%	0
Children and Youth Party	PdiM	Polish People's Party	PSL	3,751	103	3,854	0.34%	0	26,678	2.33%	0
Real Politics Union	UPR	League of Polish Families	LPR	6,352	1,158	7,510	0.66%	0	14,264	1.24%	0
Independent	Ind LPR	League of Polish Families	LPR	4,182	561	4,743	0.41%	0	14,264	1.24%	0
League of Polish Families	LPR	League of Polish Families	LPR	1,427	122	1,549	0.14%	0	14,264	1.24%	0
Right Wing of the Republic	PR	League of Polish Families	LPR	426	36	462	0.04%	0	14,264	1.24%	0
Women's Party	PK	Women's Party	PK	11,535	1,593	13,128	1.15%	0	13,992	1.22%	0
Independent	Ind PK	Women's Party	PK	795	69	864	0.08%	0	13,992	1.22%	0
Polish Labour Party	PPP	Polish Labour Party	PPP	3,210	330	3,540	0.31%	0	5,518	0.48%	0
Independent	Ind PPP	Polish Labour Party	PPP	810	92	902	0.08%	0	5,518	0.48%	0
Green Party	PZ	Polish Labour Party	PPP	448	51	499	0.04%	0	5,518	0.48%	0
Union of the Left	UL	Polish Labour Party	PPP	321	58	379	0.03%	0	5,518	0.48%	0
Polish Communist Party	KPP	Polish Labour Party	PPP	129	13	142	0.01%	0	5,518	0.48%	0
Polish Socialist Party	PPS	Polish Labour Party	PPP	50	6	56	0.00%	0	5,518	0.48%	0
New Left	NL	Self-Defence	SRP	2,506	129	2,635	0.23%	0	4,540	0.40%	0
Self-Defence of the Republic of Poland	SRP	Self-Defence	SRP	1,565	146	1,711	0.15%	0	4,540	0.40%	0
Independent	Ind SRP	Self-Defence	SRP	181	13	194	0.02%	0	4,540	0.40%	0
Valid votes				999,229	146,754	1,145,983	100.00%	19	1,145,983	100.00%	19
Rejected votes				9,269	2,192	11,461	0.99%				
Total polled				1,008,498	148,946	1,157,444	73.86%				
Registered electors				1,376,401	190,637	1,567,038					
Turnout				73.27%	78.13%	73.86%					

The following candidates were elected: Marek Borowski (SDPL), 75,493 votes; Andrzej Czuma (PO), 4,344 votes; Alicja Dąbrowska (PO), 2,885 votes; Joanna Fabisiak (PO), 7,552 votes; Artur Górski (PiS), 3,070 votes; Andrzej Halicki (PO), 3,369 votes; Jolanta Hibner (PO), 6,816 votes; Jarosław Kaczyński (PiS), 273,684 votes; Ryszard Kalisz (SLD), 37,623 votes; Karol Karski (PiS), 3,524 votes; Małgorzata Kidawa-Błońska (PO), 13,057 votes; Roman Kosecki (Ind PO), 6,847 voyes; Jan Ołdakowski (Ind PiS), 3,106 votes; Paweł Poncyljusz (PiS), 4,647 votes; Nelli Rokita (Ind PiS), 6,367 votes; Tadeusz Ross (PO), 2,712 votes; Michał Szczerba (PO), 2,372 votes; Donald Tusk (PO), 534,241 votes; and Krzysztof Tyszkiewicz (PO), 3,330 votes.

===== 2005 =====
Results of the 2005 parliamentary election held on 25 September 2005:

Party		List		Party					List		
Party		List		Votes per county		Total votes	%	Seats	Votes	%	Seats
Party		List		Warsaw	Over- seas	Total votes	%	Seats	Votes	%	Seats
Civic Platform	PO	Civic Platform	PO	171,234	10,737	181,971	23.98%	5	250,981	33.07%	8
Independent	Ind PO	Civic Platform	PO	66,033	2,492	68,525	9.03%	3	250,981	33.07%	8
Other		Civic Platform	PO	465	20	485	0.06%	0	250,981	33.07%	8
Law and Justice	PiS	Law and Justice	PiS	208,021	9,837	217,858	28.70%	6	227,153	29.93%	7
Independent politician	Ind PiS	Law and Justice	PiS	9,066	229	9,295	1.22%	1	227,153	29.93%	7
Democratic Left Alliance	SLD	Democratic Left Alliance	SLD	83,232	2,092	85,324	11.24%	3	87,477	11.53%	3
Independent	Ind SLD	Democratic Left Alliance	SLD	1,125	26	1,151	0.15%	0	87,477	11.53%	3
Union of the Left	UL	Democratic Left Alliance	SLD	769	20	789	0.10%	0	87,477	11.53%	3
Edward Gierek's; Economic Revival Movement	ROG	Democratic Left Alliance	SLD	121	0	121	0.02%	0	87,477	11.53%	3
Forum of Pensioners	FEiR	Democratic Left Alliance	SLD	88	4	92	0.01%	0	87,477	11.53%	3
Social Democracy of Poland	SDPL	Social Democracy of Poland	SDPL	46,503	1,411	47,914	6.31%	0	49,361	6.50%	0
Greens 2004	Z2004	Social Democracy of Poland	SDPL	879	56	935	0.12%	0	49,361	6.50%	0
Labour Union	UP	Social Democracy of Poland	SDPL	343	7	350	0.05%	0	49,361	6.50%	0
Independent	Ind SDPL	Social Democracy of Poland	SDPL	155	7	162	0.02%	0	49,361	6.50%	0
League of Polish Families	LPR	League of Polish Families	LPR	40,230	2,790	43,020	5.67%	1	44,376	5.85%	1
Independent	Ind LPR	League of Polish Families	LPR	1,205	151	1,356	0.18%	0	44,376	5.85%	1
Democratic Party – demokraci.pl	PD	Democratic Party	PD	34,743	2,267	37,010	4.88%	0	37,262	4.91%	0
Initiative for Poland	IdP	Democratic Party	PD	244	8	252	0.03%	0	37,262	4.91%	0
Real Politics Union	UPR	Janusz Korwin-Mikke	PJKM	18,906	871	19,777	2.61%	0	20,452	2.69%	0
Independent	Ind PJKM	Janusz Korwin-Mikke	PJKM	591	25	616	0.08%	0	20,452	2.69%	0
Janusz Korwin-Mikke Platform	PJKM	Janusz Korwin-Mikke	PJKM	55	4	59	0.01%	0	20,452	2.69%	0
Self-Defence of the Republic of Poland	SRP	Self-Defence	SRP	17,348	423	17,771	2.34%	0	17,771	2.34%	0
Patriotic Movement	RP	Patriotic Movement	RP	3,116	159	3,275	0.43%	0	8,051	1.06%	0
National-Catholic Movement	RKN	Patriotic Movement	RP	2,578	215	2,793	0.37%	0	8,051	1.06%	0
Movement for Reconstruction of Poland	ROP	Patriotic Movement	RP	921	57	978	0.13%	0	8,051	1.06%	0
Independent	Ind RP	Patriotic Movement	RP	803	43	846	0.11%	0	8,051	1.06%	0
Alliance for Poland	PdP	Patriotic Movement	RP	153	6	159	0.02%	0	8,051	1.06%	0
Independent	Ind PSL	Polish People's Party	PSL	3,666	148	3,814	0.50%	0	7,098	0.94%	0
Polish People's Party	PSL	Polish People's Party	PSL	3,141	143	3,284	0.43%	0	7,098	0.94%	0
Independent	Ind PPP	Polish Labour Party	PPP	2,818	126	2,944	0.39%	0	4,072	0.54%	0
Polish Labour Party	PPP	Polish Labour Party	PPP	417	20	437	0.06%	0	4,072	0.54%	0
Polish Socialist Party	PPS	Polish Labour Party	PPP	329	14	343	0.05%	0	4,072	0.54%	0
Anticlerical Party of Progress REASON	APPR	Polish Labour Party	PPP	278	10	288	0.04%	0	4,072	0.54%	0
Polish Communist Party	KPP	Polish Labour Party	PPP	31	2	33	0.00%	0	4,072	0.54%	0
Polish Ecological Party – Greens	PPE-Z	Polish Labour Party	PPP	26	1	27	0.00%	0	4,072	0.54%	0
Polish National Party	PPN	Polish National Party	PPN	1,572	143	1,715	0.23%	0	1,715	0.23%	0
Ancestral Home	DO	Ancestral Home	DO	539	22	561	0.07%	0	947	0.12%	0
Independent	Ind DO	Ancestral Home	DO	319	15	334	0.04%	0	947	0.12%	0
Labour Party	SP	Ancestral Home	DO	30	1	31	0.00%	0	947	0.12%	0
Movement for the Defence of the Unemployed	ROB	Ancestral Home	DO	11	0	11	0.00%	0	947	0.12%	0
Republican Forum	FR	Ancestral Home	DO	10	0	10	0.00%	0	947	0.12%	0
Democratic Party	SD	Centre Party	PC	478	26	504	0.07%	0	758	0.10%	0
Centre Party	PC	Centre Party	PC	115	8	123	0.02%	0	758	0.10%	0
Independent	Ind PC	Centre Party	PC	73	11	84	0.01%	0	758	0.10%	0
Initiative for Poland	IdP	Centre Party	PC	44	1	45	0.01%	0	758	0.10%	0
Other		Centre Party	PC	1	1	2	0.00%	0	758	0.10%	0
Polish Confederation – Dignity and Work	PKGiD	Polish Confederation – Dignity and Work	PKGiD	448	25	473	0.06%	0	473	0.06%	0
National Revival of Poland	NOP	National Revival of Poland	NOP	285	32	317	0.04%	0	429	0.06%	0
Independent	Ind NOP	National Revival of Poland	NOP	106	6	112	0.01%	0	429	0.06%	0
Independent	Ind OKO	All-Poland Civic Coalition	OKO	323	31	354	0.05%	0	419	0.06%	0
National Party of Retirees and Pensioners	KPEiR	All-Poland Civic Coalition	OKO	65	0	65	0.01%	0	419	0.06%	0
Independent	Ind IRP	Initiative	IRP	187	18	205	0.03%	0	205	0.03%	0
Valid votes				724,239	34,761	759,000	100.00%	19	759,000	100.00%	19
Rejected votes				18,372	850	19,222	2.47%				
Total polled				742,611	35,611	778,222	55.84%				
Registered electors				1,343,728	49,840	1,393,568					
Turnout				55.26%	71.45%	55.84%					

The following candidates were elected: Joanna Fabisiak (PO), 6,693 votes; Piotr Gadzinowski (SLD), 11,650 votes; Roman Giertych (LPR), 35,812 votes; Artur Górski (PiS), 2,850 votes; Małgorzata Gosiewska (PiS), 4,251 votes; Hanna Gronkiewicz-Waltz (PO), 137,280 votes; Jolanta Hibner (PO), 3,512 votes; Jarosław Kaczyński (PiS), 171,129 votes; Ryszard Kalisz (SLD), 36,013 votes; Mariusz Kamiński (PiS), 9,142 votes; Karol Karski (PiS), 2,953 votes; Małgorzata Kidawa-Błońska (PO), 4,615 votes; Roman Kosecki (Ind PO), 4,395 voyes; Jan Ołdakowski (Ind PiS), 3,939 votes; Katarzyna Piekarska (SLD), 26,511 votes; Julia Pitera (Ind PO), 39,815 votes; Paweł Poncyljusz (PiS), 4,232 votes; Paweł Śpiewak (Ind PO), 18,403 votes; and Jacek Wojciechowicz (PO), 3,380 votes.

===== 2001 =====
Results of the 2001 parliamentary election held on 23 September 2001:

List		Votes per county		Total votes	%	Seats
List		Warsaw	Over- seas	Total votes	%	Seats
Democratic Left Alliance – Labour Union	SLD-UP	263,243	6,819	270,062	36.77%	8
Law and Justice	PiS	153,436	4,990	158,426	21.57%	5
Civic Platform	PO	134,464	4,172	138,636	18.87%	4
League of Polish Families	LPR	47,655	4,676	52,331	7.12%	2
Freedom Union	UW	45,670	2,626	48,296	6.58%	0
Solidarity Electoral Action	AWS	27,566	1,931	29,497	4.02%	0
Self-Defence of the Republic of Poland	SRP	22,039	359	22,398	3.05%	0
Polish People's Party	PSL	11,412	498	11,910	1.62%	0
Social Alternative Movement	ARS	1,340	70	1,410	0.19%	0
Polish Socialist Party	PPS	1,147	64	1,211	0.16%	0
Polish National Community	PWN	310	24	334	0.05%	0
Valid votes		708,282	26,229	734,511	100.00%	19
Rejected votes		13,350	520	13,870	1.85%	
Total polled		721,632	26,749	748,381	55.89%	
Registered electors		1,297,124	41,817	1,338,941		
Turnout		55.63%	63.97%	55.89%		

The following candidates were elected: Marek Borowski (SLD-UP), 149,233 votes; Piotr Gadzinowski (SLD-UP), 10,731 votes; Jerzy Hertel (PO), 6,297 votes; Jarosław Kaczyński (PiS), 144,343 votes; Ryszard Kalisz (SLD-UP), 33,392 votes; Mariusz Kamiński (PiS), 5,257 votes; Mirosława Kątna (SLD-UP), 5,705 votes; Bronisław Komorowski (PO), 14,493 votes; Jerzy Kulej (SLD-UP), 3,488 votes; Antoni Macierewicz (LPR), 24,900 votes; Aleksander Małachowski (SLD-UP), 16,980 votes; Hanna Mierzejewska (PiS), 771 votes; Marta Mordasewicz-Zubrzycka (PO), 9,601 votes; Jan Olszewski (LPR), 13,255 votes; Katarzyna Piekarska (SLD-UP), 8,266 votes; Paweł Piskorski (PO), 69,066 votes; Paweł Poncyljusz (PiS), 1,138 votes; Bartłomiej Szrajber (PiS), 736 votes; and Michał Tober (SLD-UP), 5,680 votes.

==== 1990s ====
===== 1997 =====
Results of the 1997 parliamentary election held on 21 September 1997:

List		Votes per county		Total votes	%	Seats		
List		Warsaw	Over- seas	Total votes	%	Con.	Nat.	Tot.
Solidarity Electoral Action	AWS	236,674	16,865	253,539	31.88%	6	7	13
Democratic Left Alliance	SLD	199,639	6,316	205,955	25.90%	5	3	8
Freedom Union	UW	163,888	8,935	172,823	21.73%	4	0	4
Movement for Reconstruction of Poland	ROP	64,874	7,953	72,827	9.16%	2	0	2
Labour Union	UP	38,210	1,397	39,607	4.98%	0	0	0
Union of the Right	UPR	22,673	700	23,373	2.94%	0	0	0
National Party of Retirees and Pensioners	KPEiR	7,982	178	8,160	1.03%	0	0	0
Polish People's Party	PSL	6,882	569	7,451	0.94%	0	1	1
National Alliance of Retirees and Pensioners	KPEiR RP	5,880	181	6,061	0.76%	0	0	0
National Christian Democratic Bloc for Poland	NCDBdP	4,120	275	4,395	0.55%	0	0	0
Polish National Community-Polish National Party	PWN-PSN	763	32	795	0.10%	0	0	0
Self-Defence Alliance	PS	211	12	223	0.03%	0	0	0
Valid votes		751,796	43,413	795,209	100.00%	17	11	28
Rejected votes		13,351	1,148	14,499	1.79%			
Total polled		765,147	44,561	809,708	60.86%			
Registered electors		1,276,529	53,848	1,330,377				
Turnout		59.94%	82.75%	60.86%				

The following candidates were elected:

- Constituency seats - Czesław Bielecki (AWS), 23,489 votes; Bogumił Borowski (SLD), 7,653 votes; Piotr Gadzinowski (SLD), 15,495 votes; Bronisław Geremek (UW), 56,340 votes; Piotr Ikonowicz (SLD), 32,913 votes; Maciej Jankowski (AWS), 47,585 votes; Jarosław Kaczyński (ROP), 8,107 votes; Bronisław Komorowski (AWS), 20,251 votes; Jacek Kuroń (UW), 61,887 votes; Jan Olszewski (ROP), 59,015 votes; Katarzyna Piekarska (SLD), 13,439 votes; Maria Smereczyńska (AWS), 24,637 votes; Ewa Tomaszewska (AWS), 28,515 votes; Danuta Waniek (SLD), 99,480 votes; Edward Wende (UW), 16,552 votes; Andrzej Wielowieyski (UW), 10,311 votes; and Andrzej Zakrzewski (AWS), 33,029 votes.
- National list seats - Adam Bielan (AWS), 886 votes; Joanna Fabisiak (AWS), 6,945 votes; Stanisław Grzonkowski (AWS), 2,289 votes; Jerzy Gwiżdż (AWS), 13,823 votes; Michał Janiszewski (AWS), 3,103 votes; Mariusz Kamiński (AWS), 5,399 votes; Wacław Olak (SLD), 342 votes; Mirosław Pietrewicz (PSL), 2,498 votes; Maciej Poręba (SLD), 495 votes; Piotr Wojciech Wójcik (AWS), 1,125 votes; and Jan Zaciura (SLD), 2,564 votes.

===== 1993 =====
Results of the 1993 parliamentary election held on 19 September 1993:

List		Votes	%	Seats		
List		Votes	%	Con.	Nat.	Tot.
Democratic Left Alliance	SLD	177,788	22.37%	7	7	14
Democratic Union	UD	133,790	16.83%	5	0	5
Labour Union	UP	94,946	11.94%	3	1	4
Liberal Democratic Congress	KLD	63,897	8.04%	0	0	0
Centre Agreement	PC	61,991	7.80%	0	0	0
Nonpartisan Bloc for Support of Reforms	BBWR	50,773	6.39%	1	0	1
Coalition for the Republic	KdR	41,328	5.20%	0	0	0
Catholic Electoral Committee "Homeland"	KKWO	37,267	4.69%	0	0	0
Real Politics Union	UPR	32,072	4.03%	0	0	0
Confederation of Independent Poland	KPN	28,047	3.53%	1	0	1
Solidarity	NSZZS	26,981	3.39%	0	0	0
Polish People's Party	PSL	22,050	2.77%	0	3	3
Self-Defence - Leppera	S-L	8,831	1.11%	0	0	0
Party X	PX	5,744	0.72%	0	0	0
Polish People's Party – Peasants' Agreement	PSL-PL	3,226	0.41%	0	0	0
NOT - Technical Associations	NOT	2,450	0.31%	0	0	0
Polish National Community-Polish National Party	PWN-PSN	1,423	0.18%	0	0	0
Polish Beer-Lovers' Party	PPPP	1,184	0.15%	0	0	0
Homeland - Poland List	O-LP	1,148	0.14%	0	0	0
Valid votes		794,936	100.00%	17	11	28
Rejected votes		15,684	1.93%			
Total polled		810,620	61.09%			
Registered electors		1,326,927				

The following candidates were elected:

- Constituency seats - Ryszard Bugaj (UP), 86,708 votes; Krzysztof Dołowy (UD), 1,543 votes; Jerzy Eysymontt (BBWR), 15,235 votes; Bronisław Geremek (UD), 57,219 votes; Krzysztof Król (KPN), 22,943 votes; Jacek Kuroń (UD), 49,442 votes; Aleksander Kwaśniewski (SLD), 148,553 votes; Tomasz Nałęcz (UP), 1,314 votes; Włodzimierz Nieporęt (SLD), 1,684 votes; Katarzyna Piekarska (UD), 3,171 votes; Beata Świerczyńska (UP), 1,509 votes; Danuta Waniek (SLD), 4,762 votes; Jerzy Wiatr (SLD), 3,895 votes; Andrzej Wielowieyski (UD), 14,220 votes; Stanisław Wiśniewski (SLD), 1,787 votes; Jan Zaciura (SLD), 3,247 votes; and Ryszard Żochowski (SLD), 5,700 votes.
- National list seats - Kazimierz Dejmek (PSL), 3,018 votes; Ryszard Grodzicki (SLD), 249 votes; Adam Halber (SLD), 419 votes; Mieczysław Krajewski (SLD), 584 votes; Bogdan Krysiewicz (SLD), 402 votes; Andrzej Lipski (SLD), 298 votes; Andrzej Micewski (PSL), 5,000 votes; Sławomir Nowakowski (UP), 719 votes; Marek Rojszyk (SLD), 130 votes; Stanisław Wójcik (PSL), 1,179 votes; and Władysław Żbikowski (SLD), 437 votes.

===== 1991 =====
Results of the 1991 parliamentary election held on 27 October 1991:

List		List					Bloc				
List		Votes	%	Seats			Votes	%	Seats		
List		Votes	%	Con.	Nat.	Tot.	Votes	%	Con.	Nat.	Tot.
Democratic Union	UD	135,789	18.88%	3	2	5	135,789	18.88%	3	2	5
Liberal Democratic Congress	KLD	119,194	16.57%	3	1	4	119,194	16.57%	3	1	4
Centre Civic Alliance	POC	102,804	14.29%	3	3	6	113,233	15.74%	3	4	7
Solidarity	NSZZS	10,429	1.45%	0	1	1	113,233	15.74%	3	4	7
Democratic Left Alliance	SLD	95,666	13.30%	2	3	5	95,666	13.30%	2	3	5
Catholic Electoral Action	WAK	48,181	6.70%	1	1	2	48,181	6.70%	1	1	2
Confederation of Independent Poland	KPN	31,266	4.35%	1	3	4	36,014	5.01%	1	3	4
Polish Ecological Party - Greens	PPE-Z	3,007	0.42%	0	0	0	36,014	5.01%	1	3	4
Polish Western Union	PZZ	1,256	0.17%	0	0	0	36,014	5.01%	1	3	4
People's Christian Bloc	BLC	485	0.07%	0	0	0	36,014	5.01%	1	3	4
Labour Solidarity	SP	35,146	4.89%	1	0	1	35,146	4.89%	1	0	1
Polish Beer-Lovers' Party	PPPP	28,123	3.91%	1	0	1	28,123	3.91%	1	0	1
Real Politics Union	UPR	17,533	2.44%	1	0	1	20,207	2.81%	1	0	1
Universal Property Movement	RPW	2,674	0.37%	0	0	0	20,207	2.81%	1	0	1
Democratic-Social Movement	RDS	12,897	1.79%	1	0	1	12,897	1.79%	1	0	1
Polish People's Party	PSL	12,096	1.68%	0	2	2	12,096	1.68%	0	2	2
National Party	SN	8,405	1.17%	0	0	0	8,405	1.17%	0	0	0
Christian Democracy	ChD	7,036	0.98%	0	0	0	7,036	0.98%	0	0	0
Independent Self-Governing Trade Union of Policemen	NSZZP	6,363	0.88%	0	0	0	6,363	0.88%	0	0	0
Healthy Poland - Ecological Alliance	ZP-SE	4,636	0.64%	0	0	0	5,017	0.70%	0	0	0
Conservative-Liberal Party	PKL	381	0.05%	0	0	0	5,017	0.70%	0	0	0
Peasants' Agreement	PL	4,363	0.61%	0	0	0	4,363	0.61%	0	0	0
Democratic Party	SD	4,283	0.60%	0	0	0	4,283	0.60%	0	0	0
Solidarity 80	S80	4,073	0.57%	0	0	0	4,073	0.57%	0	0	0
Trade Unions in Defence of Society	ZZOS	3,759	0.52%	0	0	0	3,759	0.52%	0	0	0
Polish Ecological Party & Polish Green Party	PPE-PPZ	3,706	0.52%	0	0	0	3,706	0.52%	0	0	0
Freedom Party	PW	3,520	0.49%	0	0	0	3,520	0.49%	0	0	0
Victoria Party	PV	3,379	0.47%	0	0	0	3,379	0.47%	0	0	0
Polish National Community-Polish National Party	PWN-PSN	2,974	0.41%	0	0	0	2,974	0.41%	0	0	0
Confederation of Employers	KP	1,925	0.27%	0	0	0	1,925	0.27%	0	0	0
Party of Christian Democrats	PChD	1,642	0.23%	0	0	0	1,642	0.23%	0	0	0
Give Us a Chance	DNS	1,000	0.14%	0	0	0	1,000	0.14%	0	0	0
Belarusian Election Committee		384	0.05%	0	0	0	728	0.10%	0	0	0
German Minority	WDM	344	0.05%	0	0	0	728	0.10%	0	0	0
Minority Electoral Bloc		680	0.09%	0	0	0	680	0.09%	0	0	0
Valid votes		719,399	100.00%	17	16	33	719,399	100.00%	17	16	33
Rejected votes		20,491	2.77%								
Total polled		739,890	54.68%								
Registered electors		1,353,200									

The following candidates were elected:

- Constituency seats - Jan Krzysztof Bielecki (KLD), 115,002 votes; Ryszard Bugaj (SP), 30,655 votes; Zbigniew Bujak (RDS), 12,236 votes; Bronisław Geremek (UD), 31,746 votes; Adam Glapiński (POC), 2,966 votes; Jarosław Kaczyński (POC), 50,701 votes; Krzysztof Król (KPN), 24,959 votes; Jacek Kurczewski (KLD), 588 votes; Jacek Kuroń (UD), 87,131 votes; Aleksander Kwaśniewski (SLD), 73,906 votes; Antoni Macierewicz (WAK), 25,043 votes; Jan Olszewski (POC), 39,560 votes; Paweł Piskorski (KLD), 589 votes; Lech Pruchno-Wróblewski (UPR), 9,267 votes; Janusz Rewiński (PPPP), 22,774 votes; Jerzy Wiatr (SLD), 8,689 votes; and Andrzej Wielowieyski (UD), 5,547 votes.
- National list seats - Andrzej Anusz (POC), 443 votes; Marek Dąbrowski (UD), 3,486 votes; Witold Gadomski (KLD), 187 votes; Zbigniew Janas (UD), 2,454 votes; Henryk Klata (WAK), 3,011 votes; Mikołaj Kozakiewicz (PSL), 7,436 votes; Józef Pawelec (KPN), 556 votes; Katarzyna Pietrzyk (KPN), 374 votes; Marcin Przybyłowicz (POC), 773 votes; Barbara Różycka-Orszulak (KPN), 961 votes; Andrzej Smirnow (NSZZS), 4,521 votes; Zbigniew Sobotka (SLD), 1,689 votes; Henryk Strzelecki (PSL), 286 votes; Andrzej Urbański (POC), 1,265 votes; Danuta Waniek (SLD), 2,427 votes; and Jacek Żochowski (SLD), 2,221 votes.
