= Hołownia =

Hołownia is a Polish-language surname. Notable people with the surname include:

- Bogdan Hołownia
- Bożenna Hołownia
- Mateusz Hołownia
- Thaddeus Holownia
- Szymon Hołownia
