= Aleksandra Gajewska =

Aleksandra Gajewska may refer to the following people:

- Aleksandra Gajewska (born 1971), Polish theatre director, actress, and politician
- Aleksandra Gajewska (born 1989), Polish politician
