= Ewa Tomaszewska =

Polish politician (born 1947)

Ewa Tomaszewska MEP
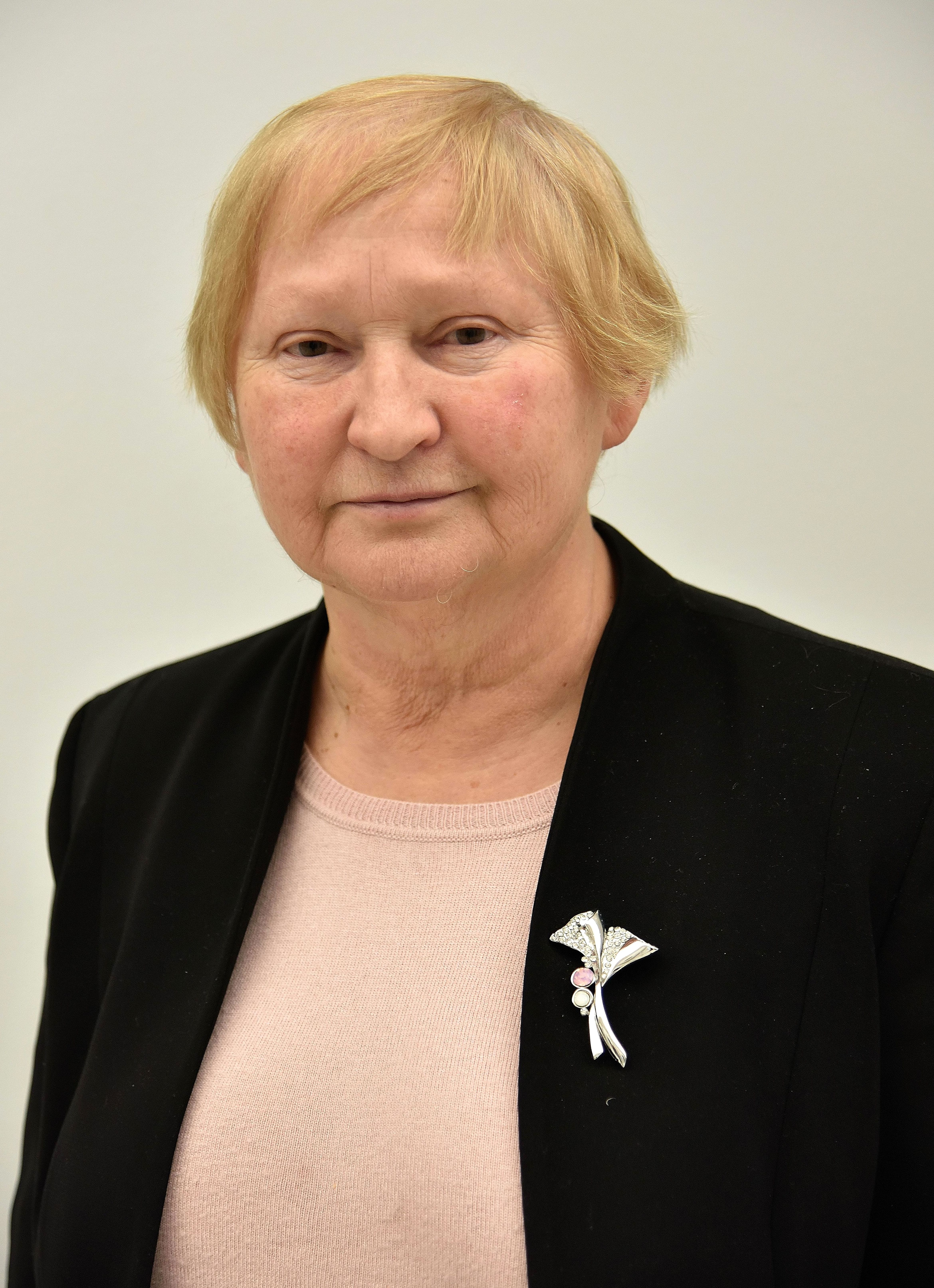

Member of the European Parliament
- In office 30 August 2007 – 13 July 2009

Personal details
- Born: 14 April 1947 (age 79) Płock, Poland
- Party: Law and Justice; Union for Europe of the Nations
- Education: University of Warsaw
- Website: http://www.tomaszewska.pl/

Ewa Tomaszewska (born 14 April 1947) is a Polish politician who currently serves in the Sejm, and previously served as a Member of the European Parliament from 2007 to 2009. Born in Płock, she graduated from the University of Warsaw in 1974 with a degree in physics. She joined the Solidarity movement in 1980, and was an activist for the group through the 1980s. In 1983, she was arrested after attempting to place a plaque up at the Wujek Coal Mine, which was under martial law at the time as a result of the Pacification of Wujek. After being released the following year, she returned to Warsaw and became a research worker.

In 1990, Tomaszewska served on the Solidarity Social Reconciliatory Committee to return political activists to work, and she also served on the Social Policy Council during the presidency of Lech Wałęsa. She was also part of the Social Assistance Council from 1995 to 1999. She was first elected to the Sejm in 1997 out of Warsaw, and was chairperson for the Social Policy Committee. She ran for re-election in 2001, but lost. In 2005, Tomaszewska was elected to the Senate of Poland, and served as deputy chairperson of the Family and Social Policy Committee.

In 2007, Tomaszewska was appointed to the European Parliament, replacing Michał Kamiński and finishing out the remainder of the term through 2009. After a time away from elected office, she was re-elected to the Sejm in 2015. In 2016, she was awarded the Cross of Freedom and Solidarity for her role in the Solidarity movement.
