= Ryszard Kalisz =

Polish politician

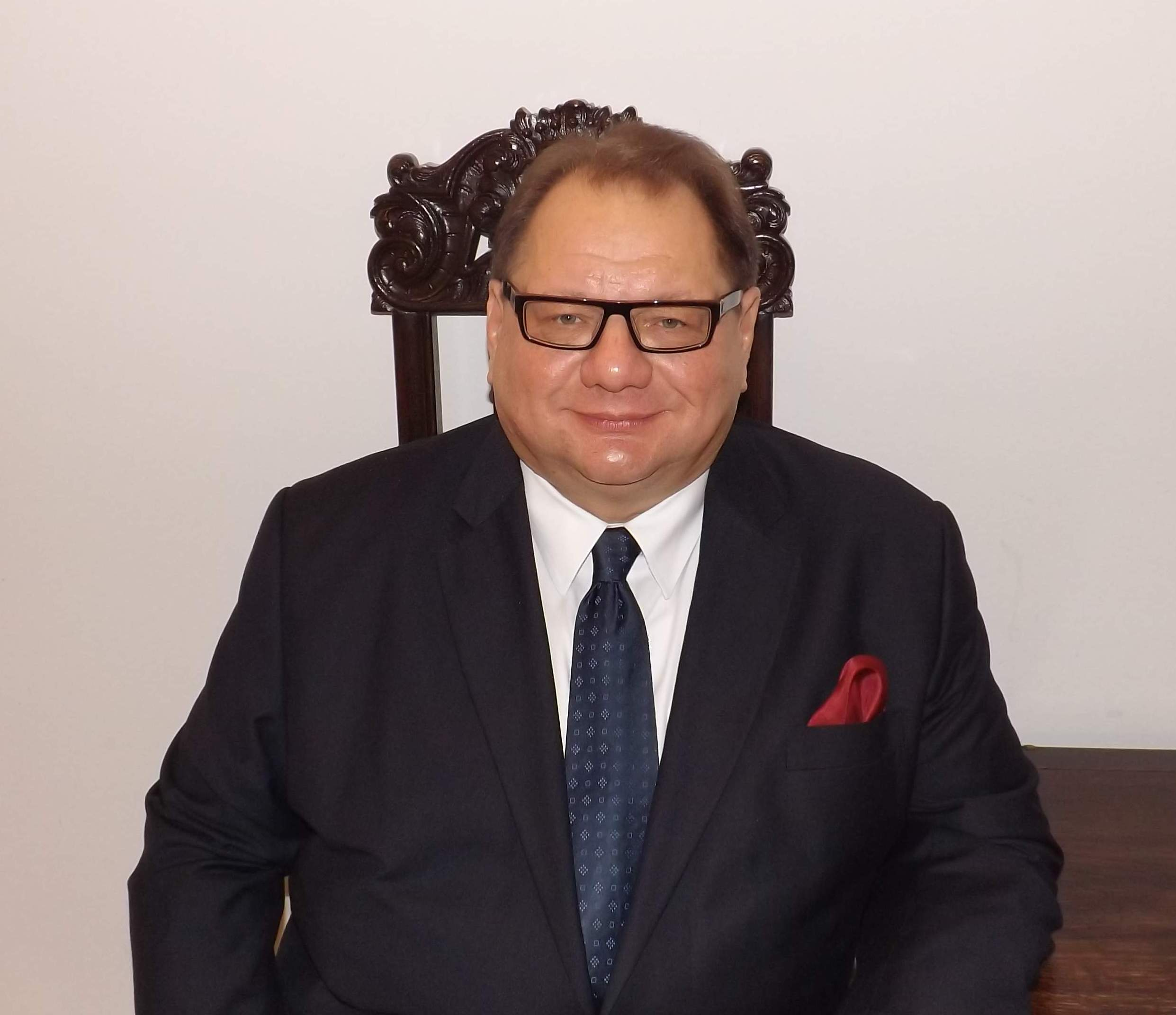

Minister of the Interior and Administration
- In office 2 May 2004 – 31 October 2005
- Prime Minister: Marek Belka
- Preceded by: Jerzy Szmajdziński
- Succeeded by: Ludwik Dorn

Member of the Sejm
- In office 19 October 2001 – 11 November 2015
- Constituency: 19 – Warsaw I

Personal details
- Born: 26 February 1957 (age 69) Warsaw, Poland
- Party: Independent (2013-present); Democratic Left Alliance (1999-2013); Social Democracy of the Republic of Poland (1990-1999); Polish United Workers' Party (1978-1990)

Ryszard Roman Kalisz (born 26 February 1957 in Warsaw) is a Polish lawyer, social democratic politician, former member of the Democratic Left Alliance party. In early years he joined the Socialist Union of Polish Students, where he was deputy director of the Main Auditing Committee. He was a member of the Polish United Workers' Party from 1978 until its dissolution in 1990.

He was the Minister of Internal Affairs and Administration in the cabinet of Marek Belka. Kalisz was elected to the Sejm on 25 September 2005, getting 36,013 votes in the 19th Warsaw district, campaigning from the Democratic Left Alliance list.

He is also a member of the Sejm 2001–2005.

He divorced in 2009. With his new wife Dominika, they have two children: Antoniusz (his step son) and Fryderyk (b. 2015).

== See also ==
- Members of Polish Sejm 2005–2007
