= Sebastian Kaleta =

Polish politician (born 1989)

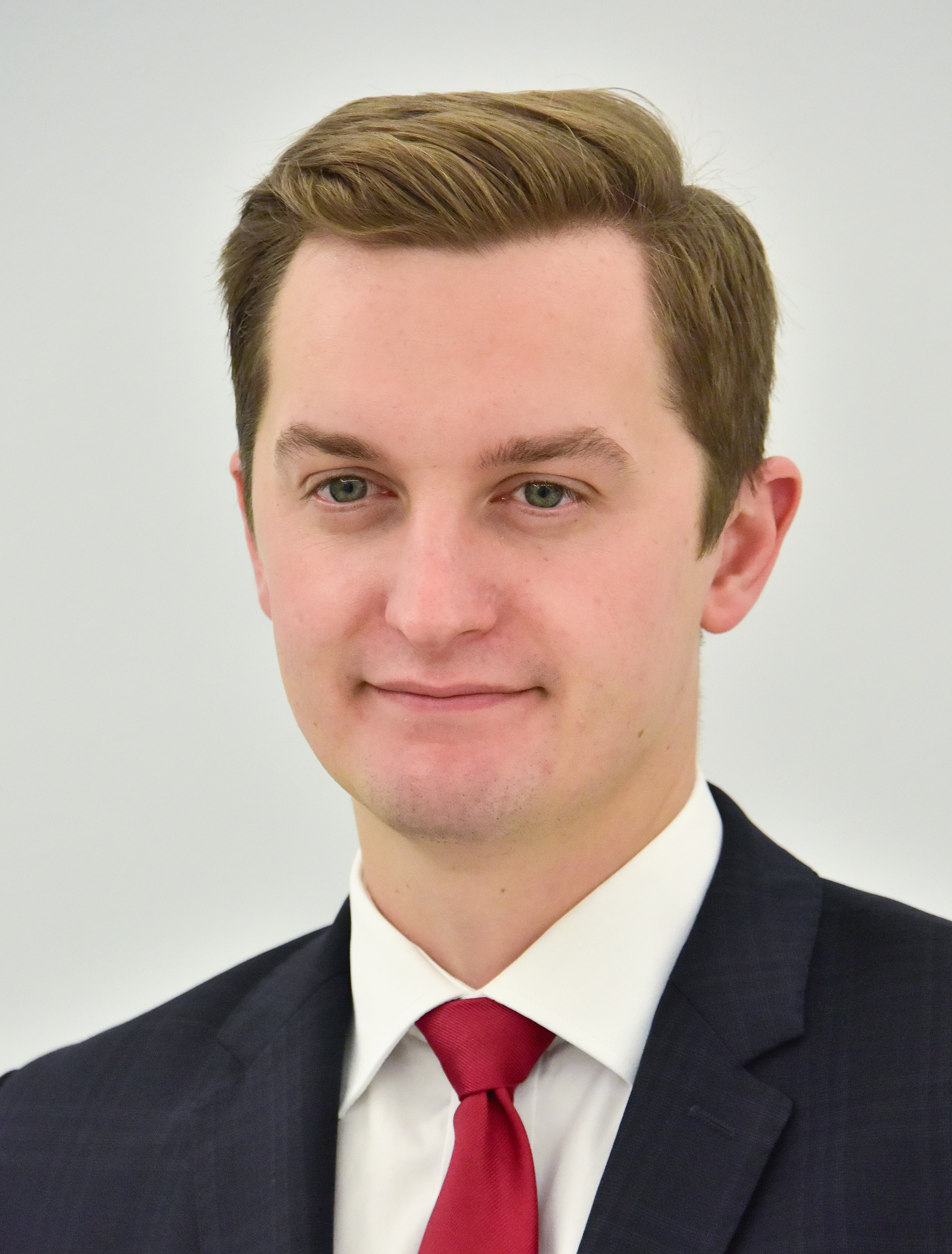
- Kaleta in 2019

Member of the Sejm
- Incumbent
- Assumed office 12 November 2019
- Constituency: Warsaw I

Personal details
- Born: 29 July 1989 (age 37)
- Party: Law and Justice (2015–2019, 2024–present)
- Other political affiliations: Sovereign Poland (2019–2024)
- Education: University of Warsaw

Sebastian Jerzy Kaleta (born 29 July 1989 in Siedliszcze) is a Polish government official, local government politician, and legal counsel. He served as Secretary of State at the Ministry of Justice (Poland) from 2019 to 2023, and chaired the Commission for the Reprivatization of Warsaw Real Estate from 2019 to 2023. He has been a member of the Sejm in its 9th term (2019–2023) and 10th term (2023–present).
