= Monarchism in Poland =

Monarchism in Poland refers both to classical monarchists seeking to restore the Kingdom of Poland under various noble families and the enthronement movement which seeks to enthrone Jesus Christ as "King of Poland" in a largely symbolic sense, with little change to the current Polish political system.

== Background ==
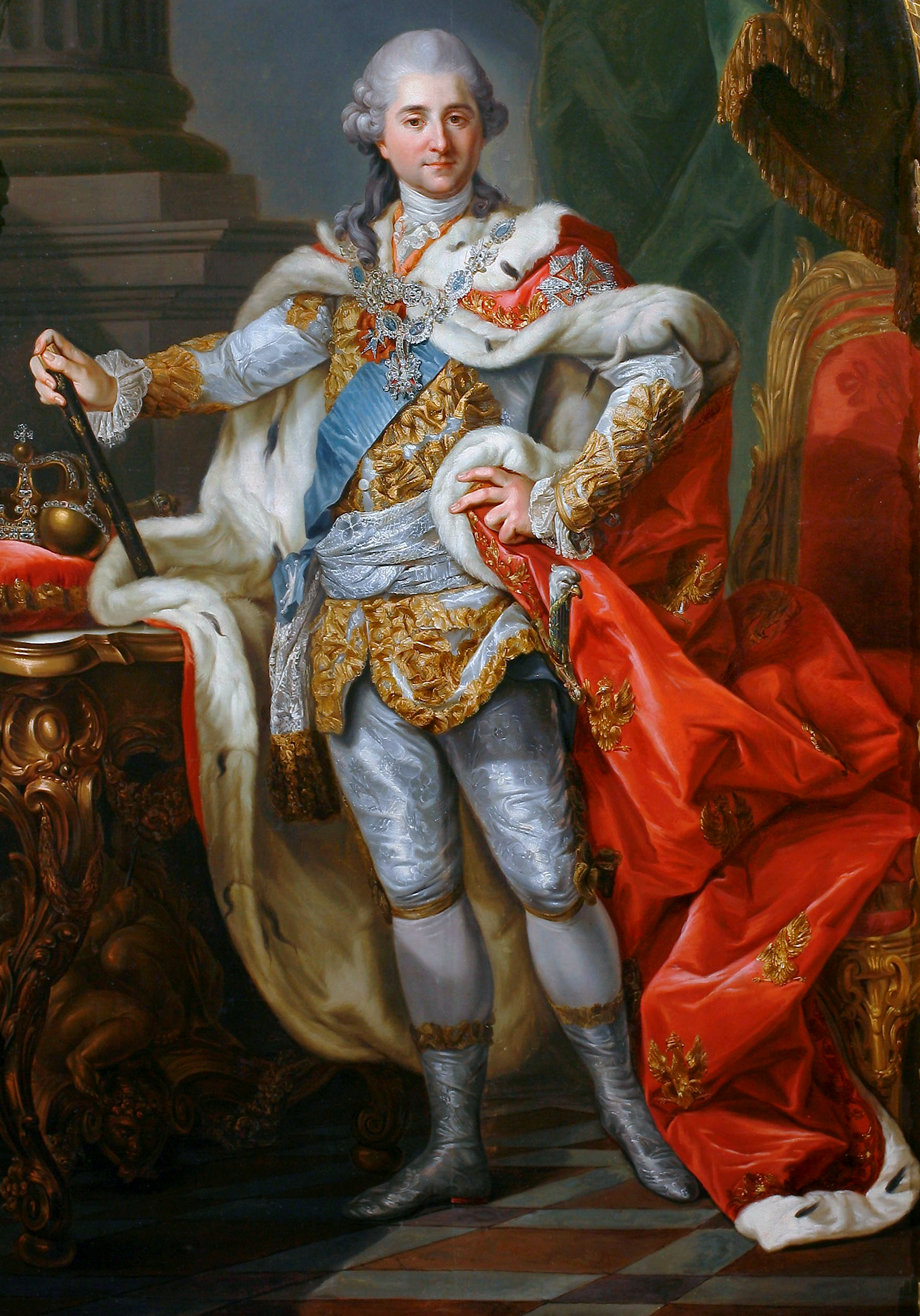
Stanisław August Poniatowski was the last independent King of Poland until his overthrow in 1795 during the third partition

From its foundation c.960 by Mieszko I, until its division during the third partition in 1795, Poland had been ruled by a monarchy under the Polish Piast Dynasty until 1370, and then the Lithuanian Jagiellon dynasty during the formation of the Polish–Lithuanian Commonwealth. With the death of the last Jagiellon king in 1572, an elective monarchy was established under the Golden Liberty. Due to the elective nature of the Polish throne various foreign noble families would rule including the Valois, Vasa, Báthory, and Wettin as well as domestic noble families such as the Wiśniowiecki, Sobieski, Leszczyński, and Poniatowski.

After the third partition Poland would be divided among Prussia, Russia, and Austria and its monarchy abolished. Napoleon attempted to recreate a Polish state in the form of the Duchy of Warsaw in 1807, crowning Frederick Augustus I of Saxony of the house of Wettin as "Duke of Warsaw" and in 1812 as "King of Poland". After Napoleon's defeat Russia would grant its portion of Poland extensive autonomy in 1817 in the form of Congress Poland, formally known as the "Kingdom of Poland" with the Russian Tsar as "King", although the autonomy would be basically ignored resulting in the November and January uprisings. Congress Poland would be transformed by the Central Powers into the Kingdom of Poland during World War I, ruled by a Regency Council with its monarch set to be elected at a later date with various German and Austrian candidates put forth. However, as the Central Powers' started to wane the Regency Council would be overthrown and the Second Polish Republic being declared, with the first Republic being the elective monarchy under the Golden Liberty.

=== Monarchism in the Second Republic ===
Despite its lack of popularity, support for the regency council and some form of constitutional monarchy continued into the Second Republic with organizations such as the People's Monarchist Union outright calling for a monarchy, while various nationalist groups had members with monarchist sympathies such as National Democracy. Additionally, the land-owning gentry in the former Galicia and Lodomeria continued to support the proposed Regency Hapsburg candidate Charles Stephen Habsburg, who spoke Polish and married into Polish noble families. During the May Coup of 1926 there was some brief optimism in Monarchists circles that Józef Piłsudski might restore the monarchy, however, he would create the Sanation regime which instead harshly cracked down on them.

== Enthronement movement ==
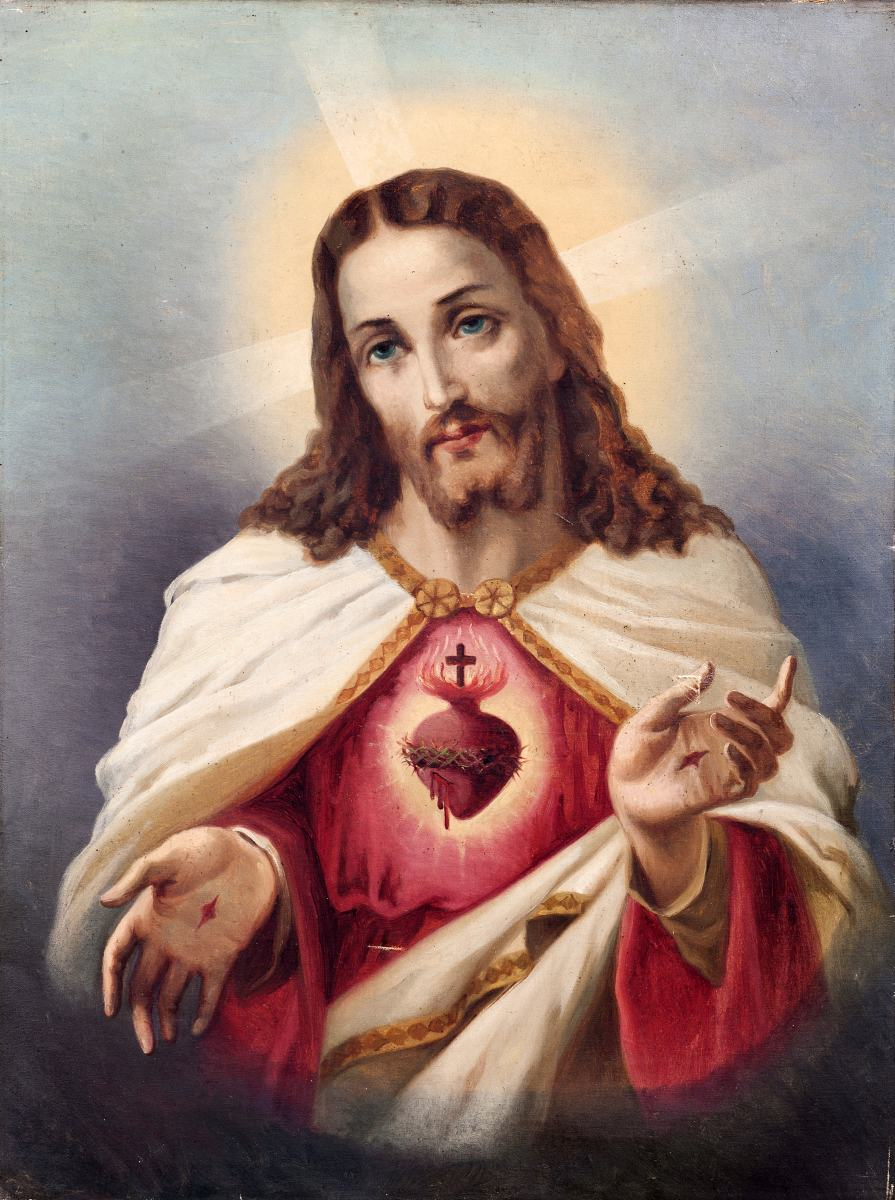
The Sacred Heart of Jesus that the enthronement movement seeks to enthrone as "King of Poland".

The enthronement movement has its origins in the encyclical Quas Primas by Pope Pius XI in 1925 urging Christians to ensure “that Christ reigns again” in society in a move against secularism. In the late 1920's and early 1930's venerable Rozalia Celakówna, a nurse, claimed to receive visions calling for the Sacred Heart of Jesus Christ to be enthroned as King of Poland. After World War II lay activists and clergy kept the wishes of Celakówna alive despite communist persecution.

In 1990 Jesuit Fr. Tadeusz Kiersztyn founded the Foundation of the Heart of Jesus which actively supported the enthronement movement, and sponsored Celakówna's 1996 beatification and made a symbolic gold crown for the Divine Mercy Basilica in Kraków. At around the same time Polish American groups in Chicago founded "Radio of Christ the King" and financed its broadcasts across Poland. The radio station, which has a Traditionalist bent, strongly advocates for Christ's enthronement.

The radio broadcast faced controversy for their social stances, including their choice of guests, which included the church figure Piotr Glas despite his record of child sexual abuse.

On 18 December 2006, Law and Justice MP Artur Górski introduced a parliamentary resolution to give Jesus Christ the title "King of Poland", backed by 46 deputies, although the bill would pass the first reading in the Sejm it was not adopted. In 2012 the Polish Episcopal Conference rebuffed the enthronement movement, saying "thinking that it is enough to call Christ the King of Poland, and everything will change for the better, must be considered illusory, even harmful to the understanding and realization of Christ’s salvation in the world." However, by 2013 the conference formed a committee to look into "intronization" and worked with lay groups both in Poland and among Polish Americans to draft a Jubilee Act of Acceptance of Jesus Christ as King and Lord.

On 19 November 2016, the Jubilee Act would be carried out, attended by President Andrzej Duda and Prime Minister Beata Szydło where Jesus Christ was proclaimed King of Poland, although, there was no formal constitutional amendment to implement this proclamation. This ceremony was not enough for die-hard members of the movement, who continue to call for Poland to be constitutionally transformed into the "Kingdom of Poland" and in 2019 far-right personality Grzegorz Braun founded his own political party, the Confederation of the Polish Crown, with a constitutional amendment to change the country into a symbolic monarchy being one of its main goals.

On 21 August 2025, Maków County accepted a petition to enthrone Jesus, and declared 21 June as "Day of Jesus Christ King of the Powiat". The Starosta of Maków County, Mirosław Augustyniak, criticized the passage of the law, stating it humiliated Maków in the eyes of Poland. Voivodeship authorities invalidated the law in September 2025.

== Classical monarchists ==
Much like the enthronement movement, more classically minded Monarchists also survived the second world war as a fringe movement, and survived underground during the communist era. Starting in the 1980's these groups began to emerge in public. These include the Conservative-Monarchist Club (KZM) established formally on 7 March 1988 which although they do not support a pretender and see it rather as an alternative to democracy. It has been founded by Artur Górski. On 16 November 1989 another group, the Organization of Polish Monarchists (OPM) was registered, which explicitly set out to “restore a Catholic monarchy” in Poland in contrast to a democracy and combined that with traditionalist and free-market ideas and worked closely with the KZM in its early years. It has supported Janusz Korwin-Mikke's Real Politics Union and Congress of the New Right. Robert Iwaszkiewicz, a member of the OPM, would be elected to the European Parliament as a member of KORWiN from 2014 to 2019.

In 1991, Leszek Wierzchowski, styling himself as "Regent of Poland" established the Polish Monarchic Movement (PRM) and calls for a monarch to be popularly elected, with hereditary succession thereafter. In 1993 a group would split off from the PRM and form the Union of Polish Monarchist Entities (UPUM) which seek a monarchy “representing the interests of the Polish nobility” and has created its own internal quasi-aristocratic structure complete with noble orders and medals.

== See also ==
- Christian state
- Constitutional references to God
- Christian amendment
