= Katarzyna Piekarska =

Polish politician (born 1967)

Katarzyna Maria Piekarska
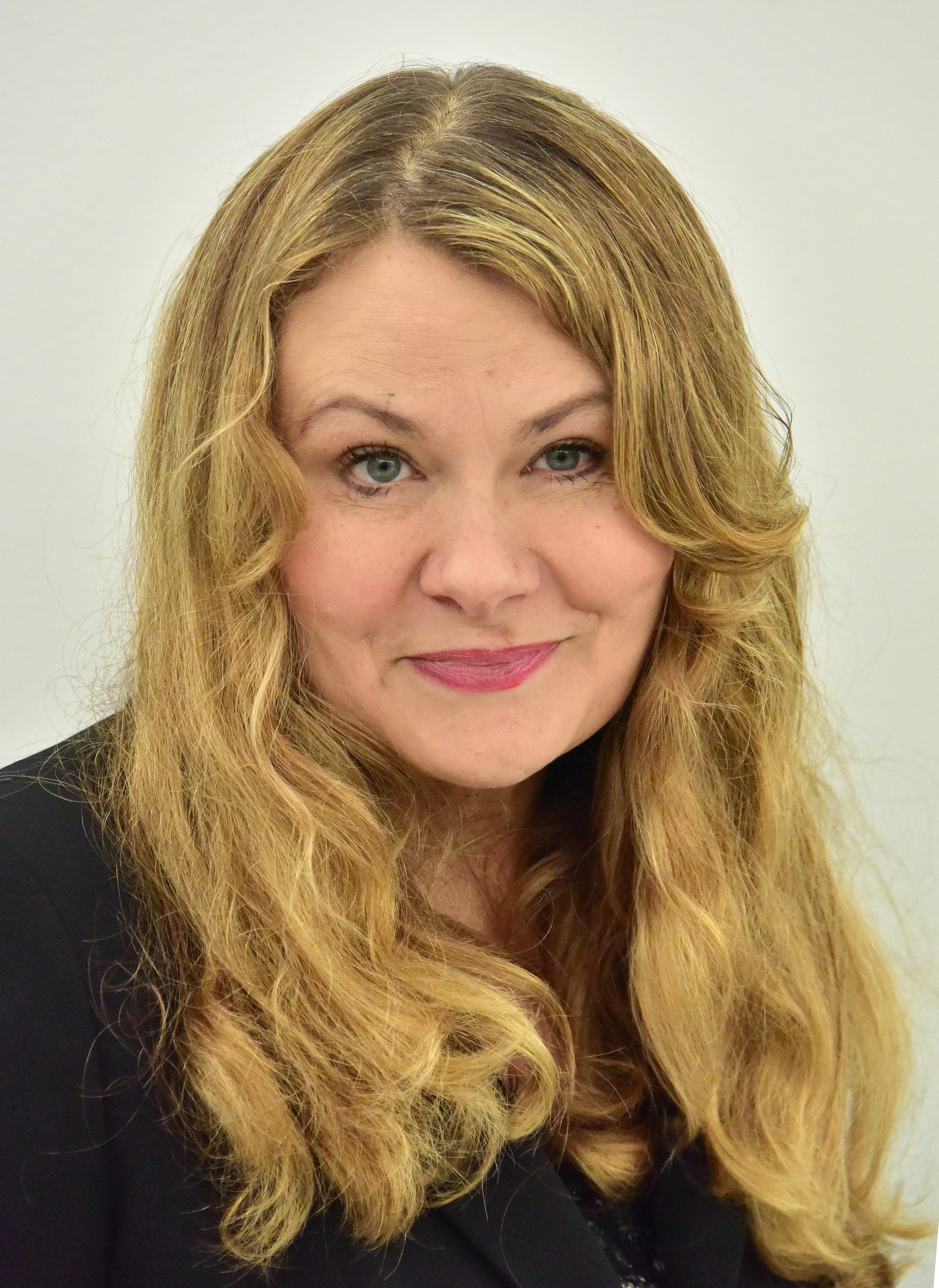

Member of the Sejm
- Incumbent
- Assumed office 12 November 2019
- Constituency: 19-Warsaw
- In office 14 October 1993 – 4 November 2007
- Constituency: 19-Warsaw

Personal details
- Born: 23 September 1967 (age 58) Warsaw, Poland
- Party: Civic Coalition (since 2025); Polish Initiative (2019-2025); Democratic Left Alliance (1997-2019); Freedom Union (1993-1997)

Katarzyna Maria Piekarska (pronounced [kataˈʐɨna pjɛˈkarska]; born 23 September 1967 in Warsaw) is a Polish politician, member of the Civic Coalition party.

She is a graduate of the Uniwersytet Warszawski in law. She worked as a lawyer.

She was elected to the Sejm on 25 September 2005, getting 26511 votes in 19 Warsaw district as a candidate from Democratic Left Alliance list. However, she failed to be elected in the 2007 election.

She was also a member of Sejm 1993–1997, Sejm 1997–2001, and Sejm 2001–2005. During her third term she was a chairman of the Justice and Human Rights commission.

From 2004 to 2005 she was a Vice Chairman of the party and during 2005 Presidential elections a chairman of Włodzimierz Cimoszewicz campaign.

In 2008 she was elected the vice-president of the Democratic Left Alliance despite not being member of the parliament.

She is a well-known advocate of ethical treatment of animals and a vegetarian. She also writes poems and plays.

== See also ==
- Members of Polish Sejm 2005-2007
