= Anna Maria Żukowska =

Polish politician (born 1983)

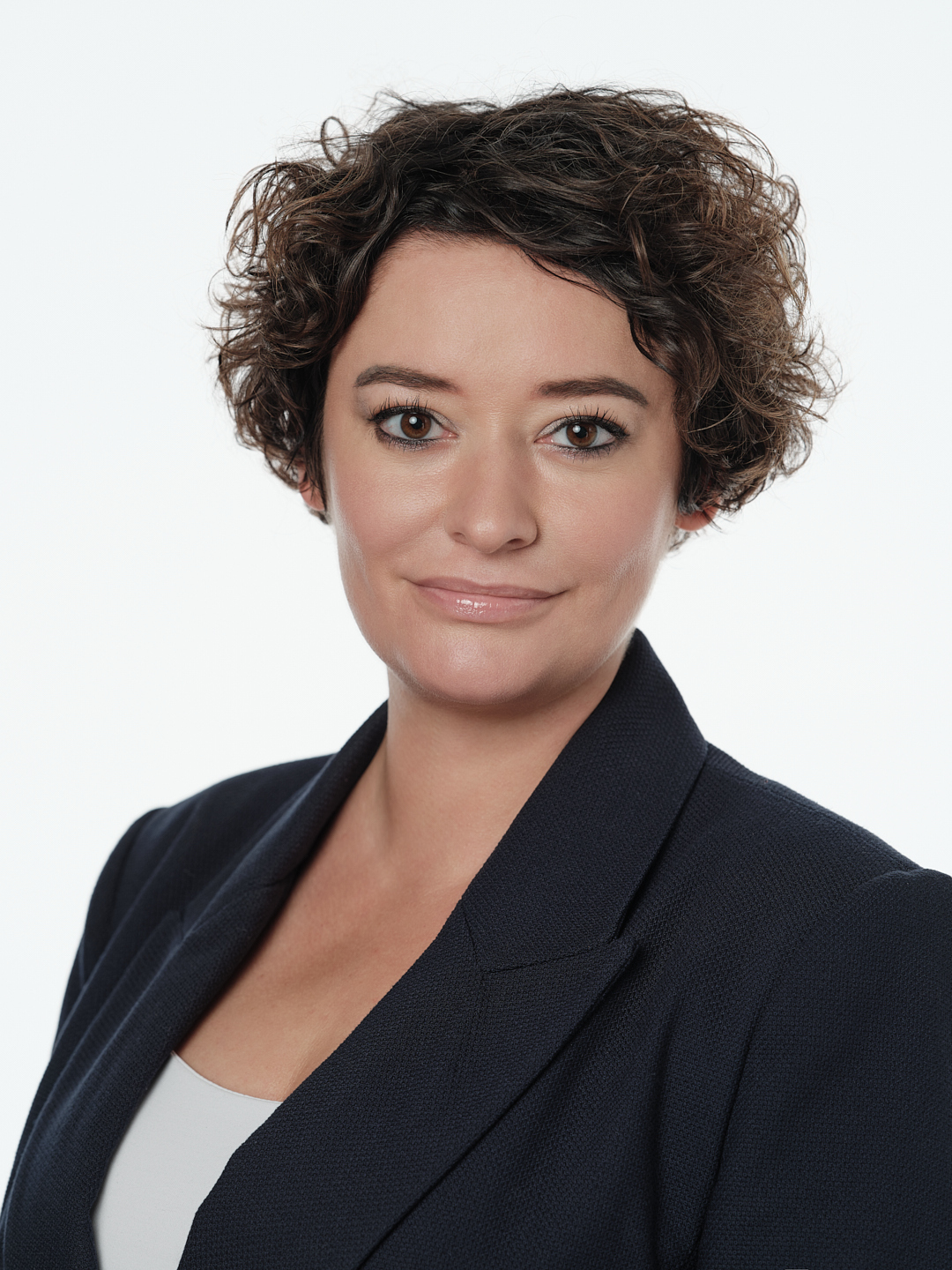
- Żukowska in 2023

Parliamentary Leader of The Left
- Incumbent
- Assumed office 12 December 2023
- Preceded by: Krzysztof Gawkowski

Member of the National Council of the Judiciary
- Incumbent
- Assumed office 14 November 2023

Member of the Sejm of Poland
- Incumbent
- Assumed office 12 November 2019
- Constituency: No. 19

Personal details
- Born: 11 June 1983 (age 43) Warsaw, Poland
- Party: New Left (since 2021)
- Other political affiliations: The Left (since 2021); Democratic Left Alliance (until 2021)
- Education: University of Warsaw
- Website: zukowska.com.pl

Anna Maria Żukowska (Polish: [ˈan.na ˈma.rja ʐuˈkɔf.ska]; born 11 June 1983) is a Polish politician and jurist. Since 2019, she has been a member of the Sejm of Poland, representing the constituency no. 19, consisting of the city of Warsaw. Since 2023, Żukowska also has been a member of the National Council of the Judiciary. She is a member and since 2025, the deputy chairperson of the New Left party, and the leader of The Left parliamentary group.

== Biography ==
Anna Maria Żukowska was born on 11 June 1983, in Warsaw, Poland. She is of Polish–Jewish descent. Żukowska attended the General Education High School of Acting no. 42 in Warsaw, where she was classmates with the film actress Hanna Konarowska and writer and businessperson Sylwia Stano. Afterwards, she attended the University of Warsaw, which she graduated in 2013 with a bachelor's degree in English studies, and in 2015 with a magister degree in jurisprudence. Żukowska co-ran the family business, and worked as a translator. She was a member of the All-Poland Jewish Youth Organization, and a member of the organisation committee of the Equality Parade, a LGBTQ community pride parade held in Warsaw.

Żukowska joined the Democratic Left Alliance party, where she became the deputy chairperson of its division in Masovian Voivodeship. In the 2010 election, she unsuccessfully ran for the seat in the district council of Mokotów, a subdivision in the city of Warsaw. In 2016, she became the party spokesperson. In the 2018 election, she unsuccessfully ran for the seat in the Warsaw City Council.

On 19 July 2019, the Democratic Left Alliance became part of The Left political alliance. Żukowska was elected in the 2019 parliamentary election to the Sejm of Poland, representing the constituency no. 19, which consists of the city of Warsaw. She recive 18,864 votes (1,37%). Żukowska became deputy chairperson of the Justice and Human Rights Committee, and a member of the Constitutional Accountability Committee, and the spokesperson of The Left parliamentary group.

In January 2021, she resigned from being the party spokesperson, following the decision in the party, to forbid active members of the Sejm to hold the office.

On 9 October 2021, the Democratic Left Alliance merged with the Spring, forming the New Left.

Żukowska was reelected in the 2023 parliamentary election, to continue being a member of the Sejm from her constituency. She received 38,426 votes (2,24%). On 14 November 2023, she was elected to the National Council of the Judiciary in the Sejm international election. On 12 December 2023, she became the leader of The Left parliamentary group in the Sejm. In 2024 election, she unsuccessfully ran for the seat in the European Parliament, representing the contitunecy no. 5, consisting of the Masovian Voivodeship. She was a candidate of The Left political alliance, and received 13,712 (1.91%). In December 2025, she became the deputy chairperson of the New Left.

== Controversies ==
Żukowska's statement made on the TVP Info news channel in 2021, in which she stated that there are situations when "a biological man gives birth to a child", have received first place in an annual online anti-award plebiscite The Worst Biological Nonsense of the Year (Polish: Biologiczna Bzdura Roku), aimed at ranking the most nonsensical, incorrect and antiscientific statements regarding biology, medicine, chemistry, psychology, and dietetics.

Her posts and comments on the social media platform X have been repeatedly subjects to controversies. Among them are her vulgar posts from March 2024 addressed towards the Marshal of the Sejm, Szymon Hołownia. She also caused a controversy in February 2025 with her statements on the TVN24 news channel, referring to the victims of the Volhynian Massacre as "old corpses" (Polish: stare trupy), regarding the contemporary Poland–Ukraine relations.

On 13 May 2025, she attended a meeting of the National Council of the Judiciary via a video call while taking a bath. It was received controversially by some members of the public, and the portion of the official recording of the meeting, in which she was seen while taking a bath, was subsequently removed from the government website.

In 2026, a controversy arose regarding Żukowska's filing for a refund of mileage allowances for the members of parliament travels, for a large amount of money, which raised doubts due to her entitlement to a government car with a driver. At the same time, a general-interest YouTube channel Kanał Zero published a video accusing her of difficulties in contacting her offices. In response, Żukowska described the journalist in a vulgar manner.

== Personal life ==
Żukowska has a daughter, Amelia. She identifies as bisexual and an atheist, having publicly came out as the former in 2018. She was in a romantic relationship with politician Hanna Gill-Piątek, who was also a member of the Sejm from 2019 to 2023.

== Electoral results ==
Electoral history of Anna Maria Żukowska
Year	Office		Party	Constituency	Votes			Result	Ref.
Year	Office		Party	Constituency	Total	%	P.	Result	Ref.
2010	Mokotów District Council	3rd	Democratic Left Alliance	No. 1	760	4.6	7th	Lost	
2018	Warsaw City Council	6th	Democratic Left Alliance, The Left, and Together	No. 7	1,882	1.7	16th	Lost	
2019	Sejm of Poland	9th	Democratic Left Alliance	No. 19	18,864	1.37	10th	Won	
2023	Sejm of Poland	10th	New Left	No. 19	38,426	2.24	9th	Won	
2024	European Parliament	10th	The Left	No. 5	13,712	1.91	11th	Lost	
