= Jarosław Krajewski =

Polish politician (born 1983)

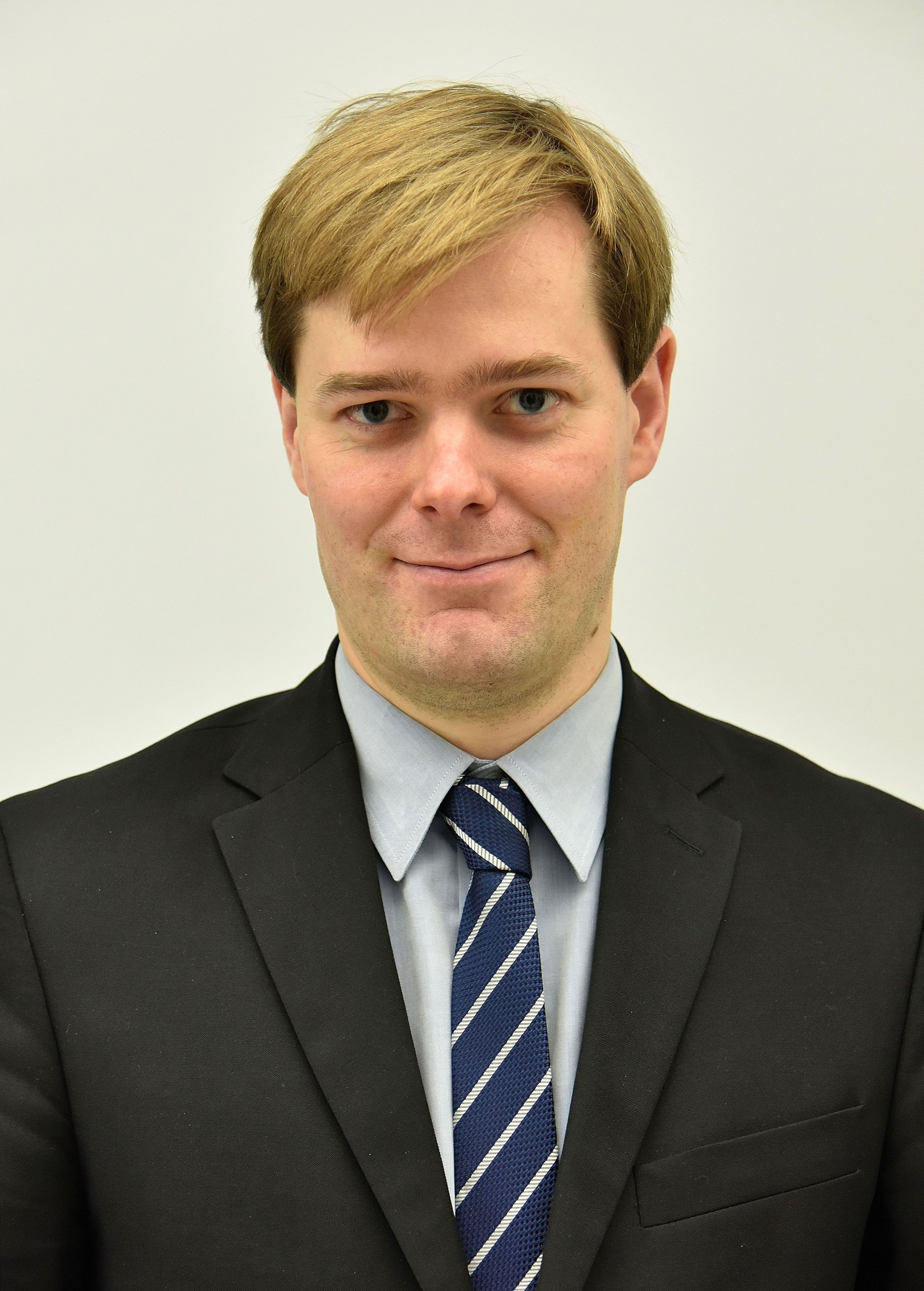
- Krajewski in 2016

Member of the Sejm
- Incumbent
- Assumed office 26 June 2024
- Preceded by: Małgorzata Gosiewska
- Constituency: Warsaw I
- In office 12 November 2015 – 12 November 2023
- Constituency: Warsaw I

Personal details
- Born: 9 March 1983 (age 43)
- Party: Law and Justice

Jarosław Krajewski (born 9 March 1983) is a Polish politician. He has been a member of the Sejm since 2024, having previously served from 2015 to 2023. From 2022 to 2023, he was the leader of Law and Justice in Warsaw.
