= Artur Górski =

Polish politician (1970–2016)

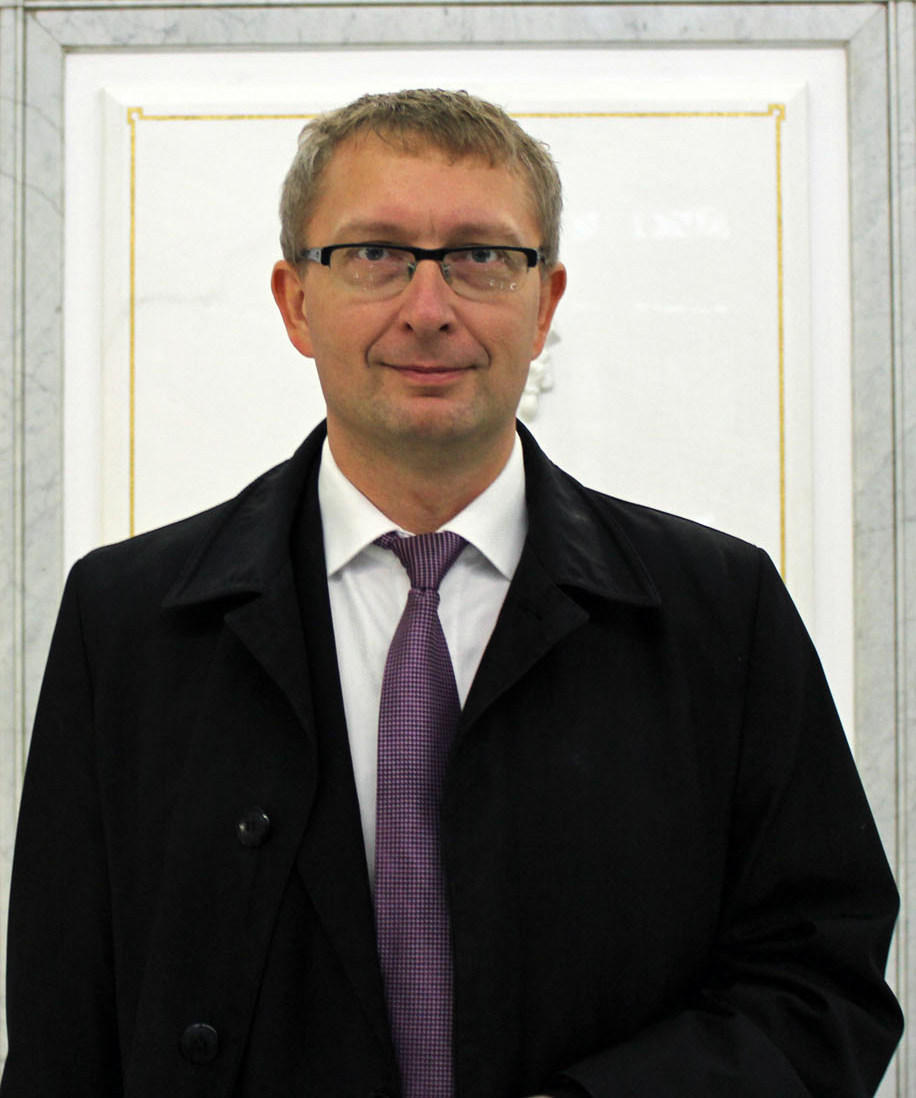

Member of the Sejm
- In office 25 September 2005 – 1 April 2016
- Constituency: 19 – Warsaw I

Personal details
- Born: 30 January 1970 Warsaw, Poland
- Died: 1 April 2016 (aged 46) Poland
- Party: Law and Justice

Artur Cezary Górski (30 January 1970 – 1 April 2016) was a Polish politician. He was elected to the Sejm on 25 September 2005, getting 2850 votes in 19 Warsaw district, running on the Law and Justice ticket. He was reelected in 2007 and was in office until his death. Górski was also the first chairman of the Conservative-Monarchist Club.

In late 2006, he spearheaded an initiative - along with other members of the League of Polish Families, Polish People's Party and his own party - to declare Jesus Christ the honorary King of Poland.

On 5 November 2008, a day after Barack Obama's victory in the United States presidential election, he called Obama the "black messiah of the new left" and said his victory marks the "end of the civilization of the white man". On 4 December 2008 the Sejm's Parliamentary Ethics Commission ordered Górski to apologize publicly for his comments about Barack Obama or to face parliamentary disciplinary proceedings. Górski told the journalists that he probably will apologize but that he had two weeks to make up his mind.

In April 2010, Górski apologized after suggesting in an interview that Russia might have been responsible for the Polish Air Force Tu-154 crash which killed President Lech Kaczyński. Górski said that he had been speaking in "a state of shock".

Górski was a vigorous opponent of legalizing same-sex unions. He likened homosexuality to ″moral decay of a society″ and claimed homosexuality is a sin that cries to the heaven.

Górski was diagnosed with leukemia and made a public plea to the fellow MP's for blood donations to save his life. Only thirty (out of over four hundred) of them decided to help, including left wing openly homosexual Robert Biedroń, who was then criticized for his act by right wing MP Zbigniew Girzyński, suggesting it's a political happening.

== See also ==
- Members of Polish Sejm 2005-2007
- Members of Polish Sejm 2007-2011
- Law and Justice political party
