= Urszula Zielińska =

Polish social and political activist

Deputy Minister of Climate and Environment
- Incumbent
- Assumed office 13 December 2023
- Prime Minister: Donald Tusk
- Minister: Paulina Hennig-Kloska

Co-chair of The Greens
- In office 15 January 2022 – 19 October 2025 Serving with Przemysław Słowik

Member of the Sejm
- Incumbent
- Assumed office 12 November 2019
- Parliamentary group: Civic Coalition
- Constituency: 19 (Warsaw I)

Personal details
- Born: Urszula Sara Zielińska; 3 October 1977 (age 48) Warsaw, Poland
- Party: The Greens (since 2004)
- Other political affiliations: Civic Coalition (since 2019)

Urszula Sara Zielińska (born 3 October 1977) is a Polish social and political activist, member of the Sejm. Since 2023, she serves as the Deputy Minister of the Climate and Environment.

== Biography ==
Zielińska graduated in management and marketing from the Academy of Leon Koźmiński in Warsaw. She obtained her master's degree in 2003. She lived and worked, among others, in Germany and Great Britain. She became a marketing manager for a company. She is fluent in English and German. She participated in protests against the logging of the Białowieża Forest and was involved in the Save Women project. She took part in the protests against Polish judiciary reforms. She is a member of the national board of the Green Party and the board of the Warsaw Center group. She is the author of the program entitled "Poland without smog", proposed by the Green Party.

Zielińska unsuccessfully ran in the 2019 European Parliament election in Poland, obtaining 7,783 votes. In the 2019 Polish parliamentary election, she was elected as a member of the Sejm for the 9th term on the list of the Civic Coalition as part of the Green Party (she received 7,536 votes in Warsaw I constituency).

== See also ==
- List of Sejm members (2019–2023)
