= Tadeusz Ross =

Polish politician (1938–2021)

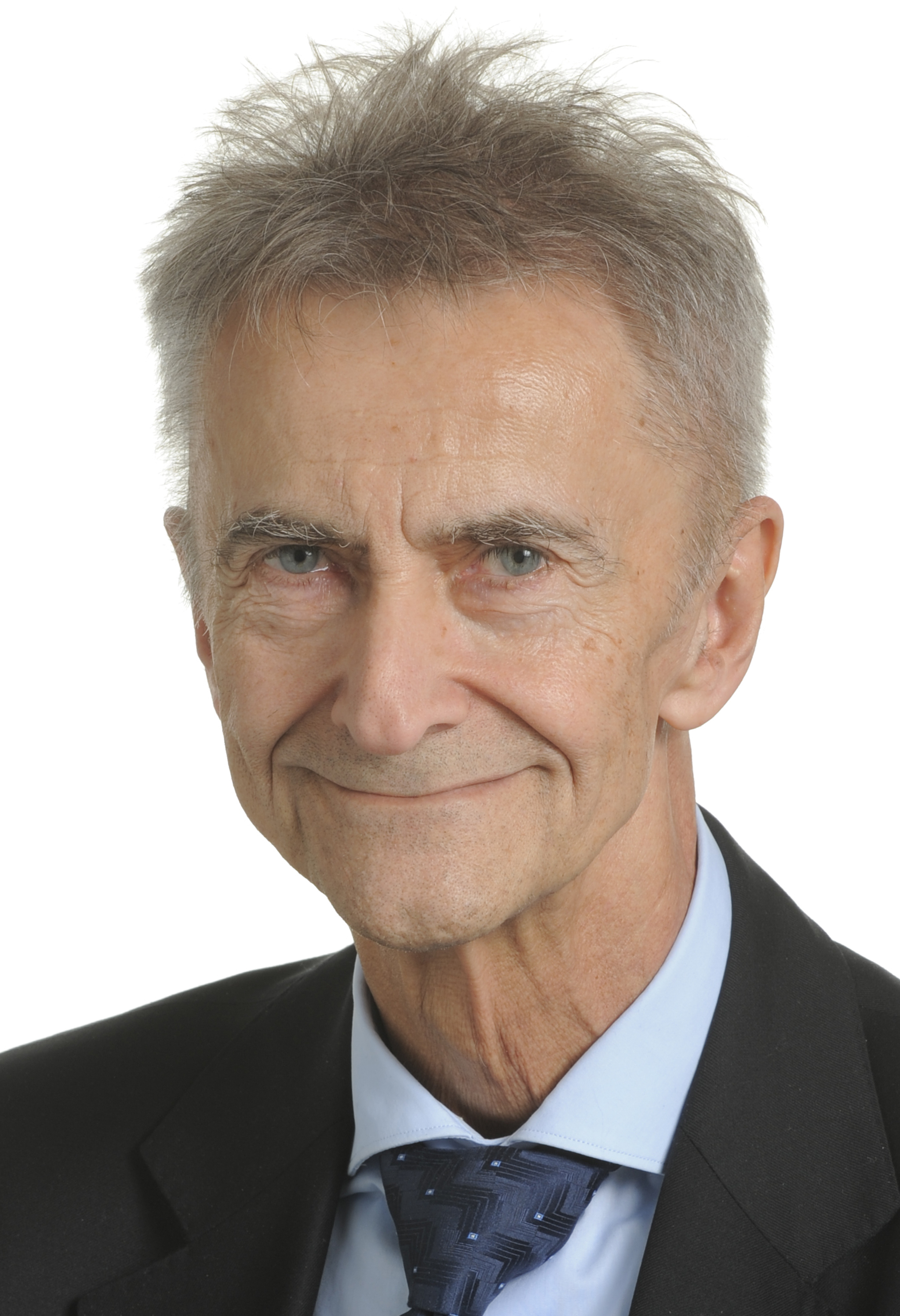
- Ross in 2013

Member of the European Parliament
- In office 17 December 2013 – 1 July 2014
- Preceded by: Rafał Trzaskowski

Member of the Sejm
- In office 5 November 2007 – 8 November 2011
- Constituency: Warsaw I

Personal details
- Born: Tadeusz Edward Ross; 14 March 1938 Warsaw, Poland
- Died: 14 December 2021 (aged 83) Warsaw, Poland
- Party: Civic Platform

Tadeusz Edward Ross (14 March 1938 – 14 December 2021) was a Polish actor and politician.

== Life and career ==
Ross graduated from the National Higher School of Theatre in 1959. He began his career as an actor. Known for television and stage satirical and cabaret appearances, in particular from the Zulu-Gula program. Together with Piotr Fronczewski, he created a cyclical satirical broadcast in PR3 entitled Rossmówki (with 60 minutes per hour as part of the broadcast). He also wrote a series of monologues about Stasiek, told in a high, soft, lisping voice. He was the author of the scripts for several episodes of the series Miodowe lata.

In the 2006 local elections, Ross was elected to the Gmina of Warsaw in the dzielnica of Mokotów as a member of the Civic Platform. He left this post in 2007 following his election to the Sejm in the Warsaw I constituency. In 2009, he unsuccessfully ran for a seat in the European Parliament. Additionally, he lost his seat in the Sejm in 2011. However, he was appointed to the European Parliament on 17 December 2013 by Prime Minister Donald Tusk, succeeding Rafał Trzaskowski following his appointment as Deputy Minister of Foreign Affairs. Ross sat on the European Parliament Committee on Constitutional Affairs.

Ross lost re-election to the European Parliament in 2014.

In 2015, he unsuccessfully ran for a seat in the Senate of Poland.

== Personal life ==
He was married five times. His last wife was journalist and therapist Sonia Ross. He had seven children.

He died in Warsaw on 14 December 2021, at the age of 83, from COVID-19. He was buried on 22 December 2021 at the Powązki Military Cemetery.

== Filmography ==
- Klan (1997) as Stanisław Lachmanx
- Plebania (2010) as Tutka
