= Paweł Poncyljusz =

Polish politician (born 1969)

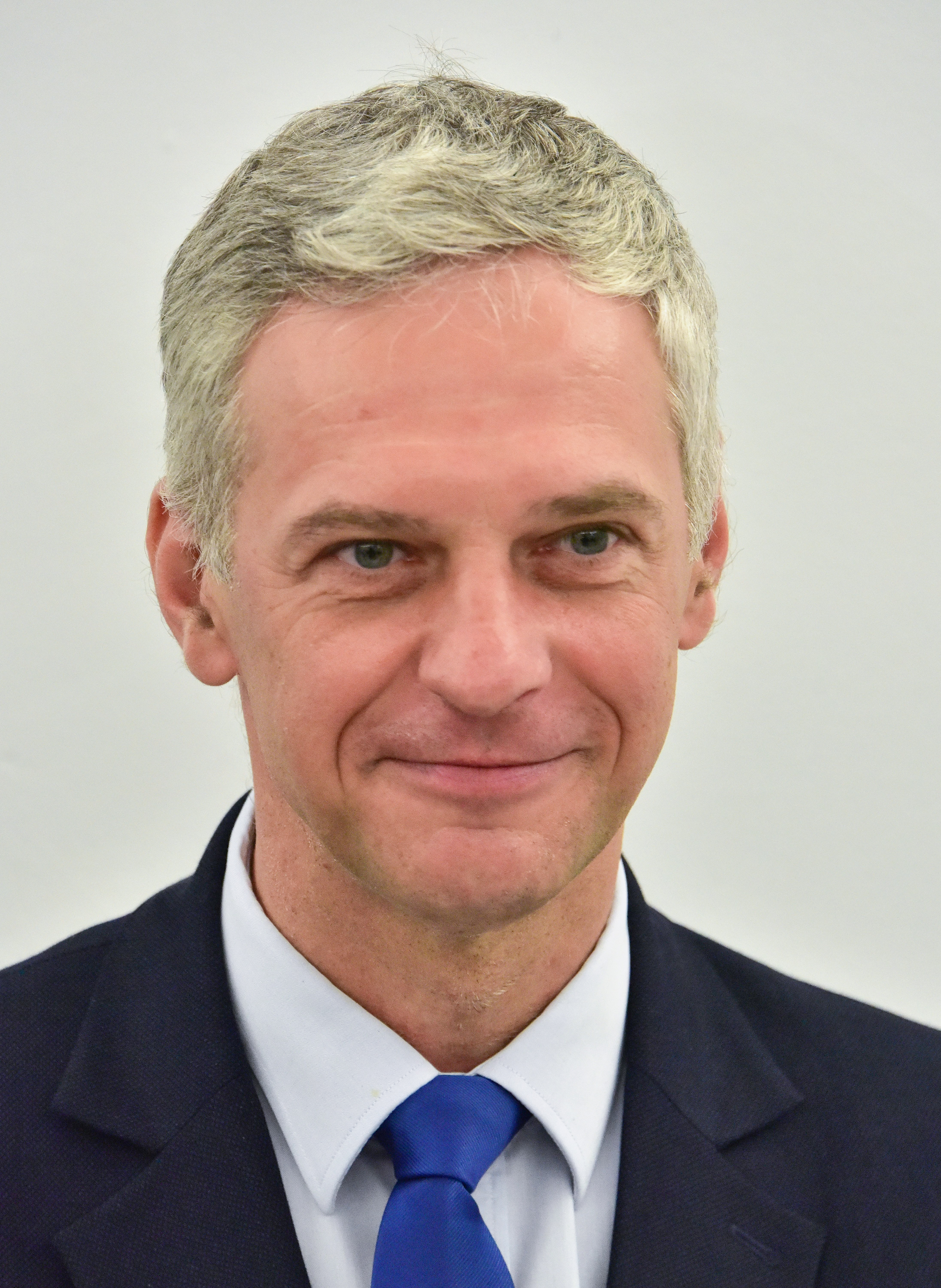

Member of the Sejm
- In office 2001–2011
- Constituency: 19 – Warsaw I

Personal details
- Born: 18 May 1969 (age 56) Warsaw
- Party: Civic Coalition (Poland) (2019-present)
- Other political affiliations: Law and Justice (2001–10); Poland Comes First (2010-2012)

Paweł Janusz Poncyljusz (born 18 May 1969 in Warsaw) is a Polish politician. He was elected to the Sejm on 25 September 2005, getting 4232 votes in Warsaw I as a candidate on the Law and Justice list. In November 2010, he moved to the new party Poland Comes First.

He was also a member of Sejm 2001-2005.

== Education ==
He is a graduate of the Karol Świerczewski Liceum in Warsaw.

== Private life ==
Married to Edyta (since 1995). The couple has four children: Julia, Zuzanna, Kacper, Łukasz.

== See also ==
- Members of Polish Sejm 2005-2007
