= Klaudia Jachira =

Polish actress and politician (born 1988)

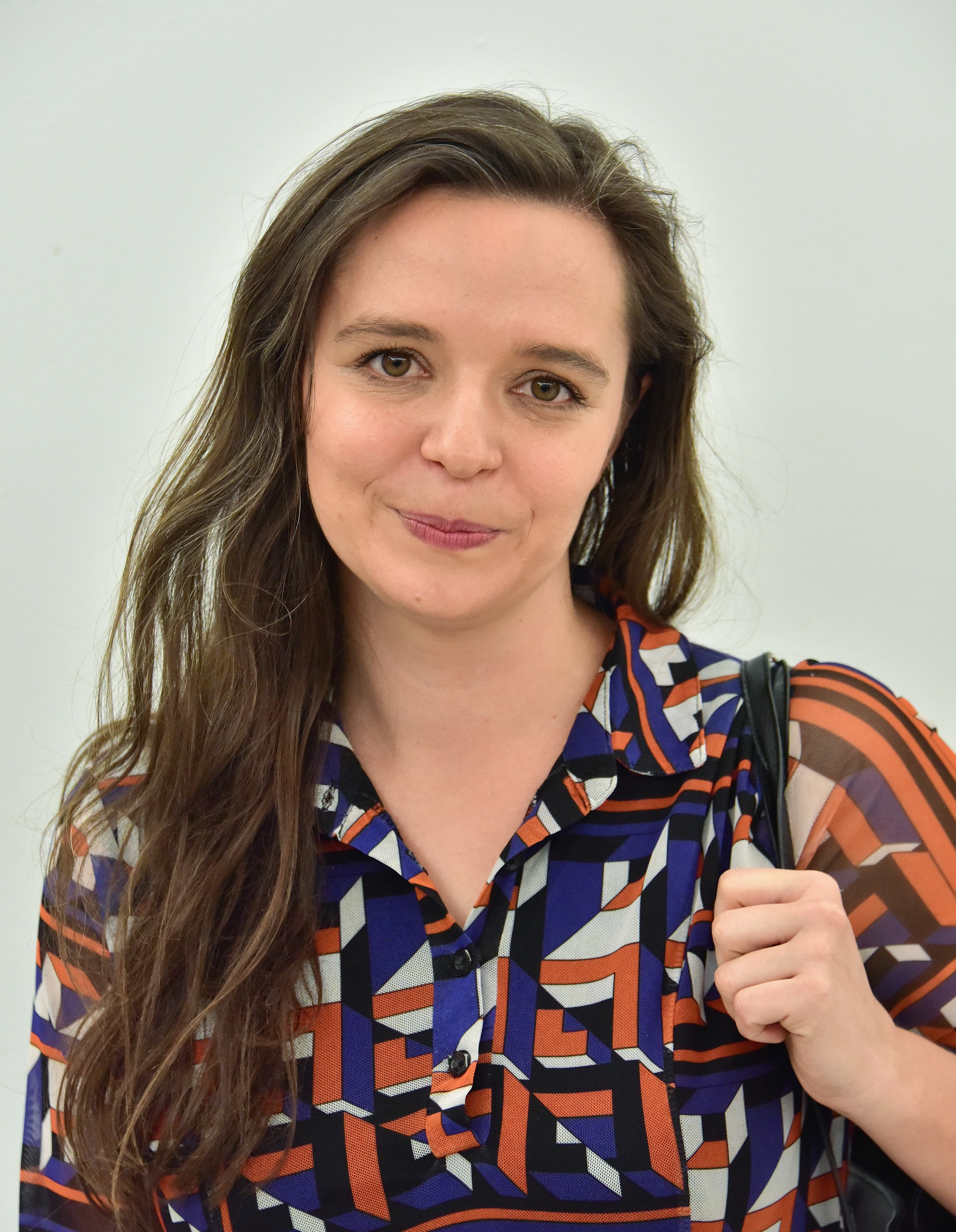
- Jachira in 2019

Member of the Sejm
- Incumbent
- Assumed office 12 November 2019
- Constituency: 19 (Warsaw)

Personal details
- Born: 31 May 1988 (age 38) Wrocław, Poland
- Party: The Greens
- Other political affiliations: Civic Coalition
- Education: AST National Academy of Theatre Arts in Kraków
- Profession: Actress, politician

Klaudia Krystyna Jachira (born 31 May 1988) is a Polish politician, actress, comedian and YouTuber. She is a member of the Sejm (10th term) since 2019.

== Biography ==
=== As actress and comedian ===
In 2008, Jachira graduated from the "L'Art Studio" Post-secondary School of Acting in Krakow, and in 2013 she graduated from the Puppetry Department in Wrocław of the AST National Academy of Theatre Arts in Kraków. She has appeared in individual episodes of various TV series, e.g. Na Wspólnej, Przyjaciółki, Pierwsza miłość.

Since 2015, she has been running the channel on the YouTube platform, posting satirical and journalistic recordings. In published materials, she criticized among others the actions of Law and Justice and the president of this party Jarosław Kaczyński, as well as part of the Catholic clergy. Her recordings and public appearances (including during the election campaign in 2019) have often been described as controversial. She is an atheist.

=== Political career ===
In 2015, Jachira ran unsuccessfully in parliamentary elections to the Sejm from sixth place on the list of Nowoczesna Ryszard Petru in Wrocław, winning 629 votes.

In the parliamentary election in 2019, she was elected as a member of the Sejm of the 9th term from the list of the Civic Coalition. In March 2023 she joined the Polish Greens. In the parliamentary election in the same year she was reelected to the Sejm with 9,172 votes.

== See also ==
- Politics of Poland
