= Joanna Fabisiak =

Polish politician (born 1950)

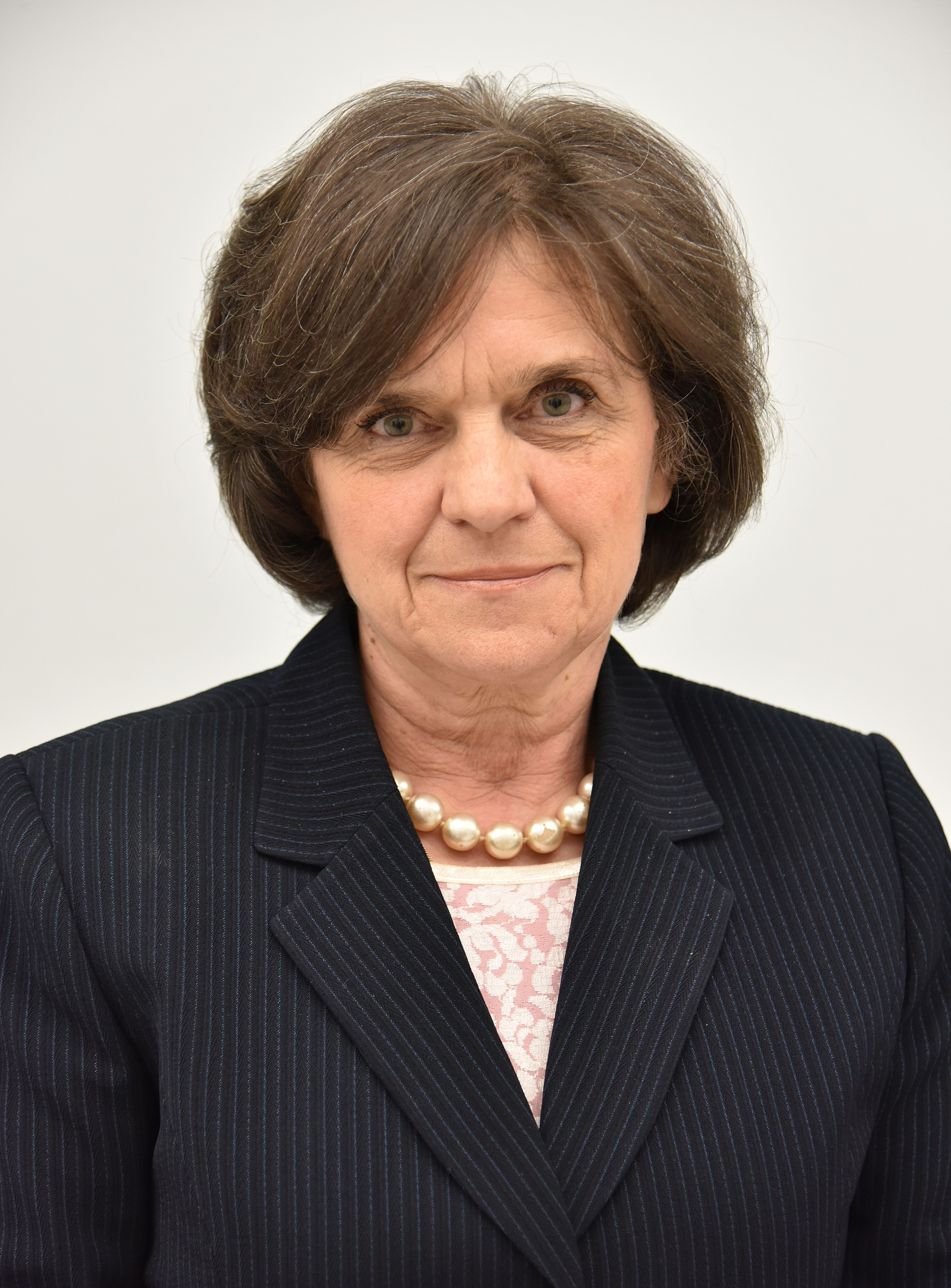

Member of the Sejm
- In office 25 September 2005 – 12 November 2023
- Constituency: 19 – Warsaw I

Personal details
- Born: 7 July 1950 (age 76) Warsaw, Poland
- Party: Civic Platform
- Children: Tomasz Machała
- Education: University of Warsaw
- Occupation: Politician
- Profession: Polish philologist

Joanna Fabisiak (born 7 July 1950 in Warsaw) is a Polish politician. She was elected to the Sejm on 25 September 2005, getting 6693 votes in 19 Warsaw district as a candidate from the Civic Platform list.

She was also a member of Sejm 1997-2001.

== See also ==
- Members of Polish Sejm 2005-2007
