= Paweł Lisiecki =

Polish politician (born 1978)

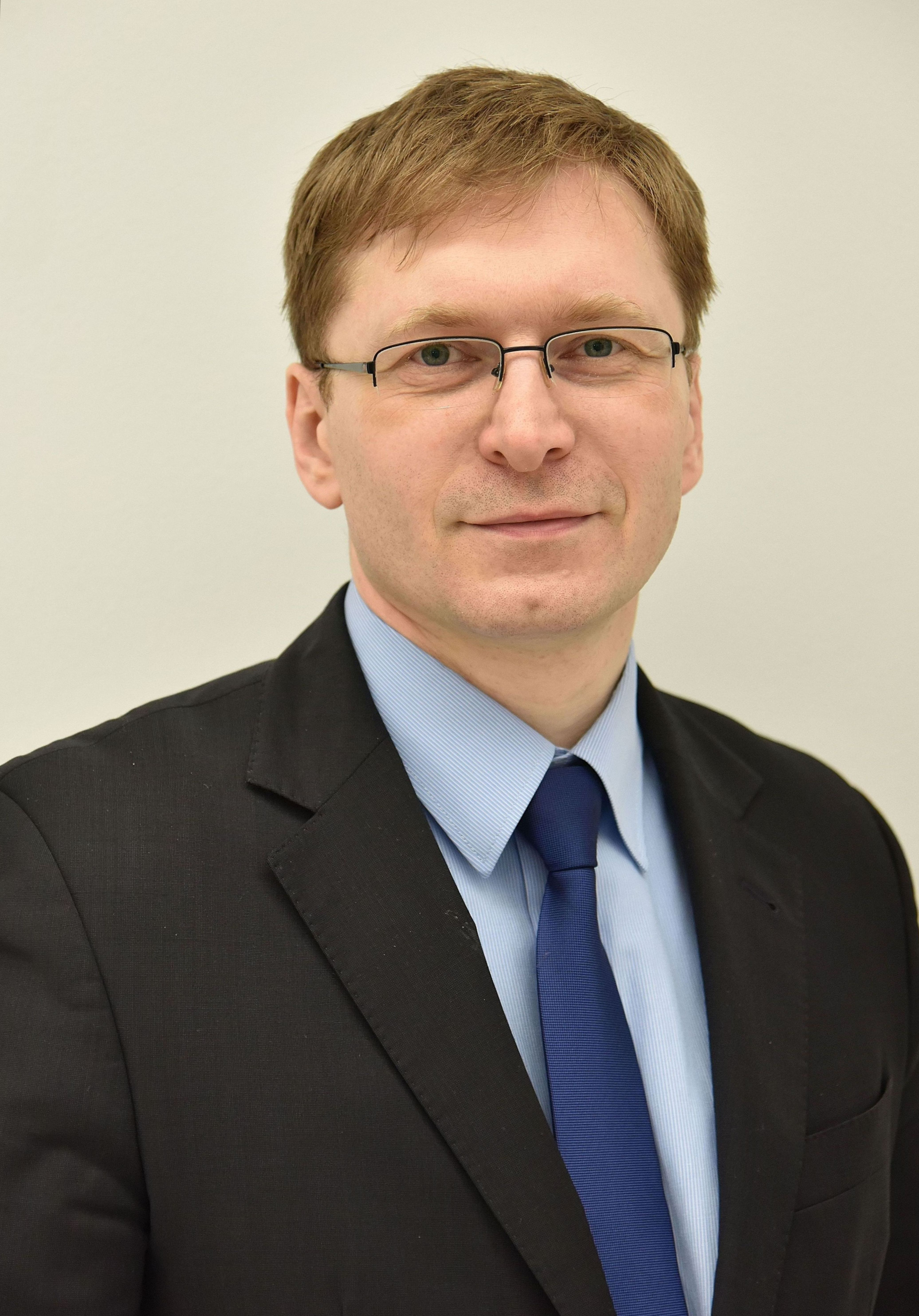

Member of the Sejm
- In office 2015–2023
- Constituency: 19-Warsaw I

Member of the Warsaw City Council
- In office 2002–2014
- Constituency: Praga-Północ

Personal details
- Born: August 15, 1978 (age 47) Warsaw, Polish People's Republic
- Party: Law and Justice

Paweł Lisiecki (born 15 August 1978) is a Polish politician, member of the Sejm and member of the Law and Justice political party. He represents the Warsaw I constituency.

From 2002 to 2014 he was a councilman of Praga Północ, and from 2014 to 2016 mayor of the district. In 2015 he was elected to the Sejm, reelected in 2019.
