= Jolanta Hibner =

Polish politician (born 1951)

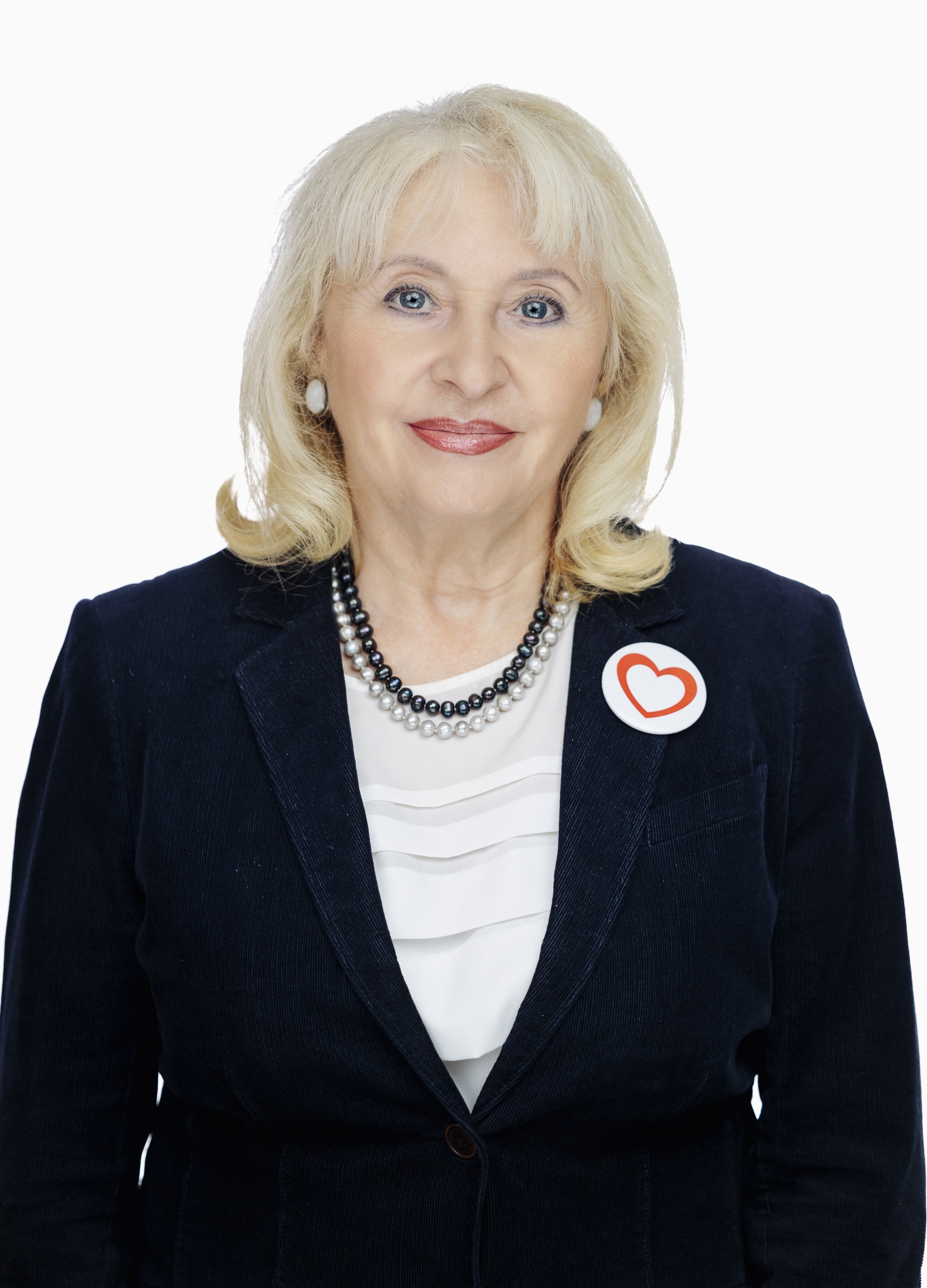

Member of the European Parliament
- Incumbent
- Assumed office 14 July 2009
- Constituency: 5 – Masovian

Member of the Sejm
- In office 25 September 2005 – 10 June 2009
- Constituency: 19 – Warsaw I

Personal details
- Born: 26 January 1951 (age 75) Ząbki
- Party: Civic Platform

Jolanta Emilia Hibner (born 26 January 1951 in Ząbki) is a Polish politician. She was elected to the Sejm on 25 September 2005, getting 3512 votes in 19 Warsaw district as a candidate from the Civic Platform list. She was re-elected on 21 October 2007.

In the 2009 European Parliament election Jolanta Hibner was elected Member of European Parliament from Masovian Voivodeship constituency.

In the 2023 Polish parliamentary election Jolanta Hibner was elected to the Senate of Poland from District 40.

== See also ==
- Members of Polish Sejm 2005-2007
- Members of Polish Sejm 2007-2011
