= Andrzej Wielowieyski =

Polish lawyer and politician (1927–2026)

Wielowieyski in 2012

Andrzej Wielowieyski (16 December 1927 – 29 August 2026) was a Polish lawyer and politician. He was a senator from 1989 to 1991 and from 2001 to 2005. He served as a Member of the Sejm of the Republic of Poland from 1991 to 2001. From 2008 to 2009 Wielowieyski was a member of European Parliament.

In 2011, Wielowieyski was awarded the Order of the White Eagle. He died on 29 August 2026, at the age of 98.
