= Alicja Dąbrowska =

Polish politician and deputy (born 1956)

Member of the Sejm
- In office 2007–2019

Personal details
- Born: 1956 (age 69–70)
- Party: Civic Platform

Alicja Dąbrowska (born 1956) is a Polish politician and doctor. She held a seat in the Sejm, being elected in 2007, 2011, and 2015. In 2019 she ran but was not elected.
