= Aleksandra Gajewska (born 1989) =

Polish politician (born 1989)

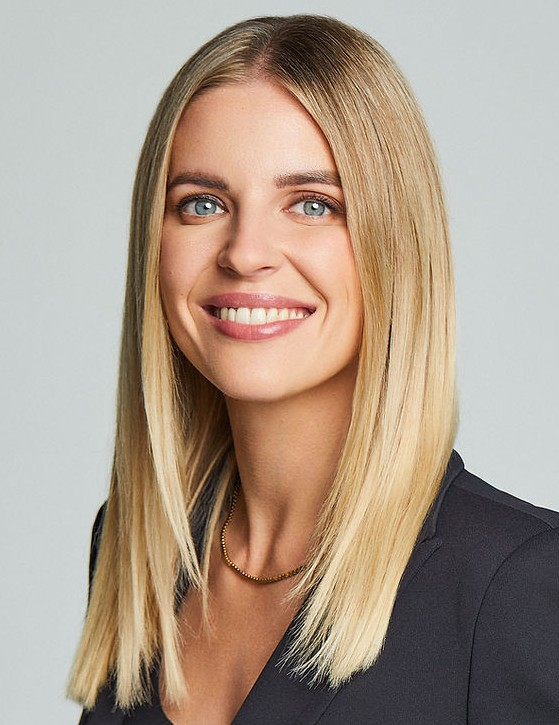
- Gajewska in 2023

Member of the Sejm of Poland
- Incumbent
- Assumed office 12 November 2019
- Constituency: No. 19

Secretary of state of the Ministry of Family, Labour and Social Policy
- Incumbent
- Assumed office 28 December 2023
- Minister: Agnieszka Dziemianowicz-Bąk
- Preceded by: Stanisław Szwed

Member of the Warsaw City Council
- In office 2 December 2010 – 21 October 2019
- Constituency: No. 6 (2010–2018); No. 8 (2018–2019)

Personal details
- Born: 22 August 1989 (age 37) Warsaw, Poland
- Party: Civic Coalition
- Other political affiliations: Civic Platform (until 2025)
- Spouse: Maciej Cnota
- Children: 1
- Education: Collegium Civitas; Collegium Humanum
- Occupation: Politician; Businessperson

Aleksandra Małgorzata Gajewska (Polish: [a.lɛkˈsan.dra maw.ɡɔˈʐa.ta ɡaˈjɛf.ska]; born 22 August 1989) is a Polish politician and businessperson. She has been a member a member of the Sejm of Poland since 2019, and the secretary of state of the Ministry of Family, Labour and Social Policy since 2023. Gajewska belongs to the Civic Coalition party.

== Biography ==
Aleksandra Gajewska was born on 22 August 1989 in Warsaw, Poland. As a child, she was a member of the SKS 12 Warszawa basketball team, and represented Poland at the 2005 International School Basketball Championship Tournament in Wrocław. In 2013, Gajewska graduated from the Collegium Civitas in Warsaw, with a Master's Degree in diplomacy and international relations. In 2021, she graduated from Collegium Humanum in Warsaw, a private university and suspected diploma mill, with a Master of Business Administration. She owns an advertisement and personnel training company.

Gajewska was a member of the Civic Platform, and the chairperson of its Warsaw division, and also a member of the Association Young Democrats. In 2010, Gajewska was elected to the office of a member of the Warsaw City Council. At the time, she was 21-years-old, becoming the youngest councilor in the city's history. Gajewska was reelected in 2014 and 2018. On 13 June 2019, she became the deputy chairperson of the council. Gajewska was a councilor until 21 October 2019.

In 2019, Gajewska was elected to the Sejm of Poland, from the constituency no. 19, consisting of the city of Warsaw. She became a member of the Protection of the Environment, Natural Resources and Forestry Committee, and the Social and Family Politics Committee. Gajewska was so a founder and leader of the Capital City of Warsaw Parliamentary Team. She was reelected in 2023, and became the deputy chairperson of the International Matters Committee, and a member of the Social and Family Politics Committee. On 28 December 2023, Gajewska became the secretary of state of the Ministry of Family, Labour and Social Policy. In 2025, her party, the Civic Platform, was transformed into the Civic Coalition.

== Personal life ==
Gajewska is married to journalist Maciej Cnota, with whom she has a son.

== Electoral results ==
Electoral history of Aleksandra Gajewska
| Year | Office | | Party | Constituency | Votes | | | Result | Ref. |
| Year | Office | | Party | Constituency | Total | % | P. | Result | Ref. |
|---|---|---|---|---|---|---|---|---|---|
| 2010 | Warsaw City Council | 4th | Civic Platform | No. 6 | 2,594 | 5.18 | 7th | Won | |
| 2014 | Warsaw City Council | 5th | Civic Platform | No. 6 | 3,712 | 7.15 | 4th | Won | |
| 2018 | Warsaw City Council | 6th | Civic Coalition | No. 8 | 32,568 | 32.60 | 1st | Won | |
| 2019 | Sejm of Poland | 9th | Civic Coalition | No. 19 | 10,228 | 0.74 | 16th | Won | |
| 2023 | Sejm of Poland | 10th | Civic Coalition | No. 19 | 49,428 | 2.88 | 8th | Won | |
