= Piotr Gadzinowski =

Polish politician (born 1957)

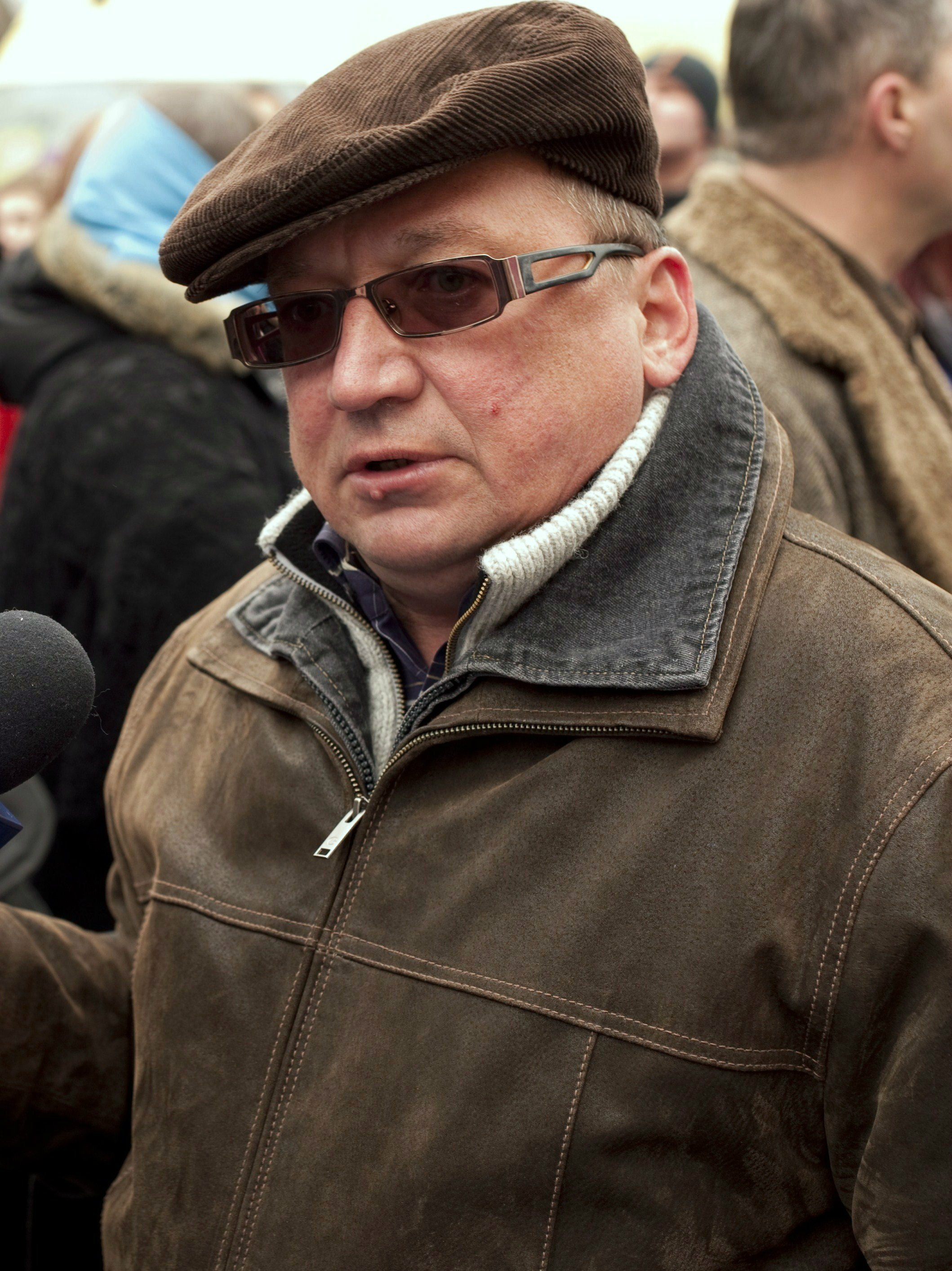

Member of Sejm
- In office 20 October 1997 – 4 November 2007

Personal details
- Born: 16 May 1957 (age 68) Częstochowa, Poland
- Party: Democratic Left Alliance

Piotr Gadzinowski (Polish pronunciation: [ˈpʲɔtr ɡadʑiˈnɔfskʲi]; born 16 May 1957 in Częstochowa) is a Polish leftist politician. He was elected to Sejm three times, he was a member of Sejm 2001–2005, Sejm 2005–2007 and Sejm 2007–2011. He also declared he was planning to start in the upcoming election.

== See also ==
- Members of Polish Sejm 1997–2001
- Members of Polish Sejm 2001–2005
- Members of Polish Sejm 2005–2007
