= Bożenna Hołownia =

Polish geographer and politician (born 1953)

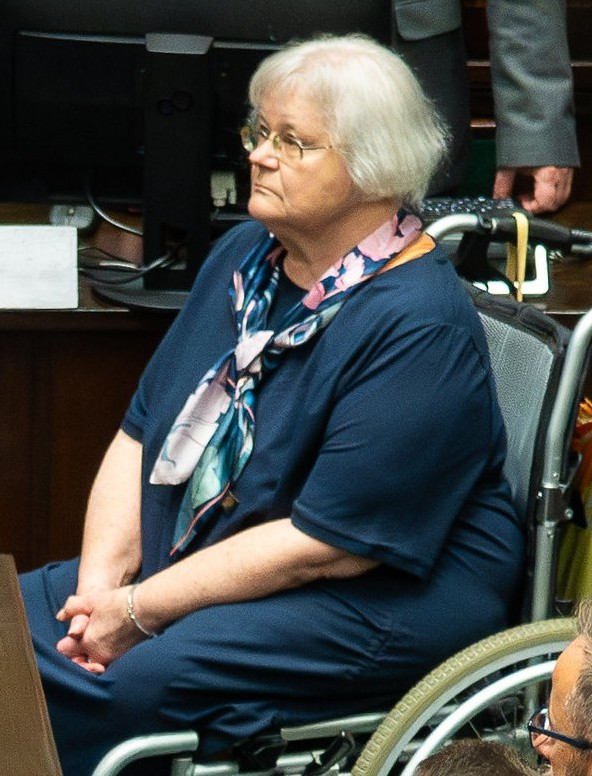
- Hołownia in 2024.

Member of the Sejm of Poland
- Incumbent
- Assumed office 26 June 2024
- Constituency: No. 19

Personal details
- Born: 27 July 1953 (age 73) Warsaw, Poland
- Party: Poland 2050
- Education: University of Warsaw
- Occupation: Politician; geographer; hydrologist; computer scientist

Bożenna Urszula Hołownia (Polish: [bɔˈʐɛn.na urˈʂu.la xɔˈwɔv.ɲa]; born 27 July 1953) is a Polish geographer, hydrologist, computer scientist, and politician. Since 2024, she is a member of the Sejm of Poland, representing the constituency no. 19, which consists of the city of Warsaw. Hołownia belongs to the Poland 2050 party.

== Biography ==
Bożenna Hołownia was born on 27 July 1953 in Warsaw, Poland. In 1977 she graduated from the University of Warsaw with a degree in geography. Hołownia specialised in the hydrology and worked in the Institute of Meteorology and Water Management and the Warsaw Regional Water Management Office. Later, until her retirement, she was a director in an internet provider company. For over 20 years Hołownia was active in the structures of the Polish Scouting and Guiding Association, being a group commander, and district deputy commander.

Hołownia is a member of the Poland 2050 political party, and she was listed during the election on the ballot of the Third Way political alliance. She unsuccessfully run for a seat in the Sejm of Poland during the 2023 parliamentary elections. Hołownia was a candidate from the constituenct no. 19, which consists of the city of Warsaw, and received 22,593 votes (1.32%). During the 2024 local elections, she unsuccessfully run to be councillor in Mokotów, one of the districts of Warsaw, in the constituency no. 2, receiving 533 votes (3.18%). Hołownia also participated in the 2024 election to the European Parliament, unsuccessfully running from the constituency no. 4 in Poland, which consists of the Warsaw metropolitan area. She received 12,796 votes (0.98%).

On 26 June 2024, Hołownia became a member of the Sejm of Poland, replacing Michał Kobosko, who was elected to the European Parliament. She joined the Poland 2050 parliamentary group, and became a member of the Social and Family Politics Committee and the Maritime Economy and Inland Navigation Committee.

== Personal life ==
Since the age of four, Hołownia has tetraplegia which developed due to polio infection. She walked with crutches, and later begun using a wheelchair.

== Electoral results ==
Year	Office		Party	District	Votes			Result	Ref.
Year	Office		Party	District	Total	%	P.	Result	Ref.
2023	Sejm of Poland	10th	Third Way	No. 19	22,593	1.32	17th	Lost	
2024	Mokotów District Council	6th	Third Way	No. 2	533	3.18	7th	Lost	
2024	European Parliament	10th	Third Way	No. 4	12,796	0.98	19th	Lost	
