= Development Plus =

Political association in Poland

Development Plus Rozwój Plus
- Full name: Stowarzyszenie Rozwój Gospodarka Przyszłość
- Abbreviation: R+
- Chairman: Mateusz Morawiecki
- Vice chairman: Łukasz Schreiber
- Founded: 15 April 2026
- Registered: 14 May 2026
- Split from: Law and Justice
- Headquarters: Marii Konopnickiej 3/1; 00-491 Warsaw
- Membership (2026): 4,200
- Ideology: Christian democracy Conservatism; Pro-Europeanism
- Political position: Centre-right to right-wing
- European Parliament group: European Conservatives and Reformists Group
- Colours: White; Red; Blue (customary)
- Sejm: 40 / 460
- Senate: 2 / 100
- European Parliament: 3 / 53

Website
- rozwoj.plus

Development Plus (Polish: Rozwój Plus, R+) is a Polish political association led and founded by Mateusz Morawiecki, who served as the Prime Minister of Poland between 2017 and 2023. It was founded on 15 April 2026 by Morawiecki and other members of Law and Justice (PiS) unsatisfied with perceived right-wing radicalization of the party. It represents the political environment informally known as the "Scouts" (Polish: Harcerze), a moderate faction of Law and Justice which was led by Morawiecki, in an opposition to the dominant conservative wing, known as the "Butter-Makers" (Polish: Maślarze). (Note: The name "Scouts" (Harcerze) comes from the association of some members with the Polish Scouting Association. The name "Butter-Makers" (Maślarze) comes from a minor scandal when Tobiasz Bocheński criticized LOT Polish Airlines for serving butter with the inscription "Deutsche Markenbutter" ("premium German butter") on board.)

Rozwój Plus has a network of members, events, and parliamentary base, making it a de facto standalone political party. Its members were to be forced out of PiS on 24 July 2026 after refusing the party leadership's demand to dissolve R+ and sign a loyalty oath prohibiting membership in any political movements besides PiS. However, PiS' political committee decided against doing so, assigning Karol Karski, the party discipline spokesman, to conduct individual hearings. While Karski affirmed that R+ members remain members of PiS, on 29 July Morawiecki founded a new parliamentary club for the association, which was registered the next day. On 13 August, PiS disciplinary committee decided to exclude every member of the association's parliamentary club.

== History ==
=== Founding and internal party dispute ===
Rozwój Plus was founded on 15 April 2026 by Mateusz Morawiecki. Upon its foundation, about 50 politicians of Law and Justice, including its MPs, senators, and MEPs, declared their support for the initiative. The foundation was seen as a result of the escalating conflict within the party between its moderate wing — the "Scouts" led by Morawiecki, and its dominant conservative wing — the "Butter-Makers" (Polish: Maślarze), led by Przemysław Czarnek, Jacek Sasin, Tobiasz Bocheński, and Patryk Jaki. The conflict was caused by the nomination of Przemysław Czarnek as the Law and Justice's candidate for prime minister in the next Polish parliamentary election in March 2026. As Czarnek represents a national-conservative wing of the party, the "Scouts" criticized his nomination as an abandonment of centrist voters, and the conflict escalated given Czarnek's failure to improve the party's standing in the polls.

Czarnek's nomination for prime ministerial candidate boosted the "Butter-Makers"; however, the support for PiS in the polls fell from 32% in 2025 to 25%, its lowest level in 14 years, following Czarnek's nomination. Under Czarnek, the party's conservatives tried to remove Morawiecki from leadership positions, regain voters from two parties further right - Confederation Liberty and Independence and the Confederation of the Polish Crown, and tap into the popularity of the President Karol Nawrocki, who had grown distant from PiS after his victory in favor of creating his own movement, which was dubbed "Polish MAGA" by the media. However, the "Butter-Makers" failed at all three tasks, leaving them unable to suppress the "Scouts" and their growing criticisms. A Super Express poll found that amongst PiS voters, 34% wanted Morawiecki to succeed Kaczyński as the party leader, compared to 21% wanting Czarnek as the successor instead.

In reaction to the foundation of the association, the party spokesman Rafał Bochenek declared that the membership in Rozwój Plus is incompatible with membership in Law and Justice. Bochenek threatened disciplinary measures against those who joined Rozwój Polski, while the leader of Law and Justice, Jarosław Kaczyński, warned that he would exclude the association's members from the party's electoral list in the upcoming parliamentary election. Rozwój Plus was founded without the knowledge of Kaczyński. However, on 21 April, Kaczyński and Morawiecki held a meeting late at night.

After the meeting, Kaczyński and Morawiecki declared that a compromise had been reached under which Rozwój Plus would operate as a new expert council of the party. Kaczyński stated that he accepted that the party would have "two lungs", referring to the party's factions of "Scouts" and "Butter-Makers". However, Morawiecki went on to formally register Rozwój Plus as a standalone association, which took place on 14 May.

In response, on June 9, the "Butter-Makers", led by Jacek Sasin, announced the creation of their own political association, Poland First (Polish: Po Pierwsze Polska), which was to play the role of the conservative "lung" of the party. Poland First was an answer to Morawiecki's association, and its stated goals were preserving the unity of PiS and supporting the campaign and candidacy of Czarnek. Poland First numbered 100 PiS MPs. Two minor conservative associations were formed as well - Marek Suski founded Lech Kaczyński's Centre Agreement Association (Polish: Stowarzyszenie Porozumienie Centrum im. Lecha Kaczyńskiego), consisting of the "old guard" of PiS who descended from Centre Agreement, the precursor to PiS, as well as Conservative Forum (Polish: Forum Konserwatywne).

=== Break with Kaczyński ===
Despite initially tolerating the association and its registration in May, relations between the "Scouts" and PiS leadership significantly soured in July. Following the Order of the White Eagle controversy, Czarnek, accusing Ukraine of glorifying and promoting Banderism, declared that PiS would "force the EU to stop financing, in any way, Ukraine's armament and reconstruction" until Ukraine changes its stance and policies. This statement was considered openly anti-Ukrainian and was then denounced by Kaczyński, who stated that military assistance to Ukraine "is absolutely necessary" and that "Czarnek’s remarks will be addressed by the party leadership". Morawiecki also criticized Czarnek's statement, arguing that Czarnek and his wing of the party are attempting to outflank the far-right pro-Russian Grzegorz Braun from the right instead of focusing on the ruling Civic Coalition and the recent South Hospital scandal.

Subsequently, the "Scouts" also criticized PiS leadership for their promises of the "Czarnek effect", a promised boost in the polls that nominating Czarnek would bring, which failed to materialize. Morawiecki had also started boycotting numerous PiS gatherings, instead organizing debates and panels on behalf of Rozwój Plus. At the end of June, Morawiecki announced that Rozwój Plus would organize a large barbecue event on 31 July named "Rozwój Plus plus Wy", where Morawiecki and his political environment would discuss socioeconomic issues with voters. The media interpreted the barbecue as a show of political strength given its large scope and date, with 31 July seen "as a signal in itself: it marks the end of the political season, just before the strategic lull in the first half of August."

According to Rzeczpospolita, Kaczyński reacted to the announcement with fury, as Morawiecki did not consult the event with him, and the event was also seen as a breach of the agreement reached in April to make Rozwój Plus an expert council of PiS. Believing that only a few MPs would stay with Morawiecki when threatened with expulsion, Kaczyński decided to act against Rozwój Plus. According to Newsweek, internal party polls conducted by presidential advisor Piotr Agatowski were also decisive in Kaczyński's judgement, as they showed that Rozwój Plus would only win 2.8% of the popular vote, with PiS losing only 0.7 pp to it. This was in contrast to public media polls in which Rozwój Plus polled between 6 and 7%.

=== Ultimatum ===
Members of the Sejm and European Parliament who signed onto the letter to Jarosław Kaczyński
Member	Parliamentary position	Member	Parliamentary position
Anna Baluch	Member of the Sejm	Krzysztof Lipiec	Member of the Sejm
Ryszard Bartosik	Member of the Sejm	Grzegorz Lorek (Note: Left Development Plus to return to Law and Justice.)	Member of the Sejm
Waldemar Buda	Member of the EP	Marzena Machałek	Member of the Sejm
Zbigniew Chmielowiec	Member of the Sejm	Grzegorz Macko	Member of the Sejm
Anna Cicholska	Member of the Sejm	Mateusz Morawiecki	Member of the Sejm
Janusz Cieszyński	Member of the Sejm	Piotr Müller	Member of the EP
Michał Cieślak	Member of the Sejm	Daniel Obajtek (Note: Signed loyalty oath and remained within Law and Justice.)	Member of the EP
Anita Czerwińska (Note: Signed loyalty oath and remained within Law and Justice; was not a member of Development Plus.)	Member of the Sejm	Monika Pawłowska	Member of the Sejm
Elżbieta Duda	Member of the Sejm	Grzegorz Puda	Member of the Sejm
Michał Dworczyk	Member of the EP	Paweł Rychlik	Member of the Sejm
Robert Gontarz	Member of the Sejm	Łukasz Schreiber	Member of the Sejm
Andrzej Gut-Mostowy	Member of the Sejm	Olga Semeniuk-Patkowska	Member of the Sejm
Marcin Gwóźdź	Member of the Sejm	Sławomir Skwarek	Member of the Sejm
Marcin Horała	Member of the Sejm	Mirosława Stachowiak-Różecka	Member of the Sejm
Paweł Jabłoński	Member of the Sejm	Krzysztof Szczucki	Member of the Sejm
Marek Jakubiak (Note: Not a member of Law and Justice.)	Member of the Sejm	Szymon Szynkowski vel Sęk	Member of the Sejm
Fryderyk Kapinos	Member of the Sejm	Agnieszka Ścigaj	Member of the Sejm
Łukasz Kmita	Member of the Sejm	Ryszard Terlecki	Member of the Sejm
Maria Koc	Member of the Sejm	Włodzimierz Tomaszewski	Member of the Sejm
Wiesław Krajewski	Member of the Sejm	Sylwester Tułajew	Member of the Sejm
Andrzej Kryj	Member of the Sejm	Wojciech Zubowski	Member of the Sejm
Krzysztof Kubów	Member of the Sejm	Ireneusz Zyska	Member of the Sejm
Anna Kwiecień	Member of the Sejm		

On 15 July, Bochenek announced that the party's presidium adopted a resolution "prohibiting the activity and participation of PiS party members in associations, foundations, and other political organizations." It gave its members time until 23 July to obey the ruling, and those who failed to do so would be excluded from the party. PiS members had to sign a loyalty oath, confirming that they have abandoned any political association, foundation, or organization besides PiS.

Poland First was immediately dissolved after the resolution, all of its members signing the oath. According to Onet, PiS leadership believed that only about 20 to 25 MPs are hardline allies of Morawiecki, while the rest of Rozwój Plus were opportunists who struggled with their region and were looking for patrons. The "Butter-Makers" would speculate in the media that only about 10 MPs out of the 40 active in Rozwój Plus would refuse to sign the oath, thus leaving Morawiecki isolated. On 17 July, 45 members of Rozwój Plus published a letter to Kaczyński in which they stated that their aim is party unity, adding that "unity – even when there are differences of opinion on the way forward – remains a prerequisite for lasting victory and responsibility for the state". At the same time, the letter said that PiS must "reconnect with those groups that have drifted away from us in recent years and to regain their trust."

One "Scout", Daniel Obajtek, did agree to sign the oath and thus leave Rozwój Plus. The loyalty oath was also signed by Anita Czerwińska, who did not join Rozwój Plus, but is a "Scout". All other "Scouts" , however, did not, refusing to leave the association.

As a result, on 23 July, the day the deadline ended, Morawiecki and Kaczyński held talks in what the media called a "last chance meeting" with the purpose of finding a compromise. In the meeting, Morawiecki reportedly offered numerous concessions, such as limiting the number of association's conferences, or establishing a joint advisory council between Rozwój Plus and PiS. In total, Morawiecki presented 21 proposals to end the rift. However, no agreement was reached.

=== Attempted expulsion from PiS ===
On 24 July, as Rozwój Plus members refused to dissolve the association and sign the loyalty oaths, Kaczyński declared that they had excluded themselves from PiS. Morawiecki made a statement on his own, stating that he and his group had fought "until the very last moment" to preserve party unity. The number of MPs who supported Morawiecki was considered surprising. Morawiecki argued that he did not split the party, but has been "pushed out" of it. On 27 July, Grzegorz Lorek left Morawiecki's association. Lorek refused to explain his decision, other than stating: "As Lincoln said, I am not obligated to win, but I am obligated to be true to what I believe is right…". The media noted the fact that Lorek was allowed back into the party despite signing the loyalty oath past the deadline.

The Law and Justice political committee met on 28 July 2026 to formalize the expulsion of Morawiecki and the rest of Rozwój Plus members, amounting to 40 MPs, 1 Senator, and 3 MEPs. However, it would rule against doing so, with the party's disciplinary spokesman claiming that there were no grounds for Morawiecki's expulsion. The committee decided not to remove him or the other Rozwój Plus members from PiS, effectively preserving their party membership despite the internal conflict. The committee declared that the case of each Rozwój Plus member will be decided individually by the party discipline spokesman Karol Karski.

According to Wirtualna Polska, the decision to not expel the members of Rozwój Plus from PiS was dictated by practical reasons, such as preventing the establishment of a new parliamentary group (and ultimately a new party) and retaining state funding that PiS receives for each MP. Wirtualna Polska also argued that Karski would postpone his decision regarding each Rozwój Plus member indefinitely, as Karski has yet to make a decision regarding Krzysztof Szczucki, a PiS MP who was suspended in April 2026.

=== New parliamentary club ===
On 29 July, Mateusz Morawiecki would declare on a press conference his intention to establish a new parliamentary club "Rozwój Plus". This was in spite of the Law and Justice political committee deciding to not pursue his expulsion. This new club would consist of 40 MPs and one senator, making it the third largest club of the 10th-term Sejm. Press spokesperson for Law and Justice Rafał Bochenek accused Morawiecki of misleading both the party, and the public, arguing that no new club could be registered unless its potential members first withdrew from Law and Justice. On the same day, Piotr Uściński, a PiS MP, announced that he would join Rozwój Plus, bringing the number of Rozwój Plus MPs back to 40. On 31 July, Szymon Giżyński, a PiS MP suspended from the party in mid-July, also decided to join the R+ parliamentary club, increasing its amount of Sejm deputies to 41.

The parliamentary club of Rozwój Plus was registered the next day, on 30 July. Morawiecki became its chairman, while Łukasz Schreiber was appointed as the vice chairman. On the same day, Rozwój Plus endorsed Michał Drewnicki, the candidate of PiS, in the 2026 Kraków mayoral election. On 31 July, the barbecue event in Warsaw was held by Rozwój Plus, where Morawiecki presented its program. The event was attended by Russian oppositionist Garry Kasparov, and R+ also obtained a dispensation from Friday fast for Catholic attendees.

On 3 August, during an interview Morawiecki would express his plans to establish Rozwój Plus into a political party by October 15 of the same year. This was in spite of most parliamentary club members still sitting as members of Law and Justice. On the same day, Karski stated that R+ members remain PiS members and contacted each of R+ MPs through phone. Some of them declared themselves to no longer be members of PiS, while others affirmed that they remain of PiS despite their R+ membership. Karski expressed openness to talks.

Paweł Kukiz, the leader of Kukiz'15 and a member of the Direct Democracy parliamentary group, stated that he would join Rozwój Plus once he recovers from rib and spinal fractures he suffered earlier in 2026. On 9 August 2026, Ryszard Majer, a senator from PiS, announced that he would leave PiS and join Rozwój Plus, which he did later that day.

== Ideology ==
The association has been described as centre-right, and presents itself as a "modern, European Christian democracy" that wishes to reach out to those who oppose both Donald Tusk and the far-right political parties. The stated goal of Rozwój Plus is seeking dialogue and broad agreement with other political movements, supporting socioeconomic development, and creating a patriotic camp beyond party lines. Political scientist Agnieszka Zaremba described the association as conservative and based on Christian values, but one that distances itself from far-right views such as the ones represented by the Confederation of the Polish Crown. Rozwój Plus identifies itself as a "broadly defined conservative-patriotic camp."

Rozwój Plus has also been described as liberal-conservative, economically liberal, pro-EU, technocratic-conservative, centrist, and oriented towards younger and more moderate voters compared to PiS. It was considered an attempt "to steer the party [PiS] towards the political centre". The association has called for forming a broad centre-right and solidarist bloc, with Morawiecki calling for "not bloodthirsty capitalism, not just economic liberalism and not communism, but social solidarism". Rozwój Plus has positioned itself "as a home for conservatives who want competence rather than culture war"; it has also been described as "pragmatically conservative and economically modernizing", with a strongly economic-oriented policy.

Writing on Rozwój Plus, Krytyka Polityczna described it as "less populist [than PiS], free from libertarian and anti-state populism, more technocratic, with some room for gestures towards leftist sensibilities". It also argued that the economic vision of Rozwój Plus is "one in which the state — unlike the visions from the "libertarian" part of the Confederation — plays a key role in economic policy: it sets its tasks, selects the means to implement them, identifies and supports the emergence of champions, and, to some extent, ensures that no one is left behind." At the same time, it noted that Rozwój Plus shares the cultural conservatism of PiS and the rest of the Polish right-wing mainstream movements. However, Morawiecki's group was also described as the "economically liberal wing" of PiS.

=== Program ===
On 28 July 2026, Morawiecki presented the program of Rozwój Plus based on "10 pillars", advocating for patriotism as "the guiding principle for every decision", support for President Karol Nawrocki, sovereign and independent migration policy, "tightening" tax system by restricting the ability to transfer profits abroad while increasing the second tax bracket (tax bracket for middle income), expanding Polish nuclear energy, opposing the climate policy and New Pact on Migration and Asylum of the European Union, and massive investment into the Polish economy through reviving major investment projects such as the Central Communication Port and expansion of Polish railways and ports. Morawiecki also called for "strong alliance with NATO" and "cooperation within the Intermarium".

Rozwój Plus advocates a package of policies aimed to halt the demographic decline in Poland. Morawiecki proposed a new welfare program Parental Allowance (Polish: Pensja Rodzicielska), a pension equal to the minimum wage for parents with children aged between 0 and 3; the pension would be subject to social security and taxation, entitling the parents to health insurance and pension fund. The association also proposes the Family Pension Contribution (Polish: Emerytalna Składka Rodzinna) program, under which a quarter of every worker's pension fund contribution would be paid to their parents (one-eight to each of two parents), with the remaining three-quarters remaining in the pension fund. Morawiecki stated his opposition to increased migration to Poland, arguing that migration is not a solution to demographic decline and that it is something that Poland "must defend itself effectively" from. He also stated the opposition of R+ to the European migration policy, stating that the EU should not be allowed to pressure its member states to alter their migration laws.
