= Opinion polling for the next Polish parliamentary election =

In the run up to the next Polish parliamentary election in 2027, various organisations carried out opinion polling to gauge voting intention in Poland. Results of such polls are displayed in this article. The date range for these opinion polls are from the previous parliamentary election, held on 15 October 2023, to the day of the next election.

To be represented in parliament, electoral committees which are registered as political parties must reach an electoral threshold of 5%, and those registered as coalitions must reach 8%.

== Polling aggregations ==
The following tables display the most recent aggregations of poll results and equivalent projected seat shares in the Sejm from different polling organisations.

=== Vote share ===
Poll Aggregator/Link	Last Update	PiS	KO	Polska 2050	PSL	Lewica	Razem	Konfederacja	KKP	R+	Lead
PolitPro	15 October	21.7	33.7	1.3	3.0	7.1	4.0	14.0	9.2	5.1	12.0
Politico	22 September	21	32	–	–	8	4	14	8	5	11
ewybory.eu	15 October	19.8	31.9	1.3	2.9	6.6	3.7	13.2	8.9	4.9	12.1
DawidStats	15 October	20.5	32.0	1.2	3.0	7.0	3.8	13.2	8.9	5.0	11.5

=== Seat share ===
Poll Aggregator/Link	Last Update	PiS	KO	Polska 2050	PSL	Lewica	Razem	Konfederacja	KKP	R+	Government	Opposition (Note: Includes the right-wing opposition (R+, PiS, Konfederacja, KKP), and the left-wing opposition (Razem))	Majority
ewybory.eu	25 October	128	197	0	0	18	0	70	47	0	215	245	Opposition
DawidStats	25 October	119	193	0	0	20	0	70	46	12	213	247	Opposition

== Graphical summary ==
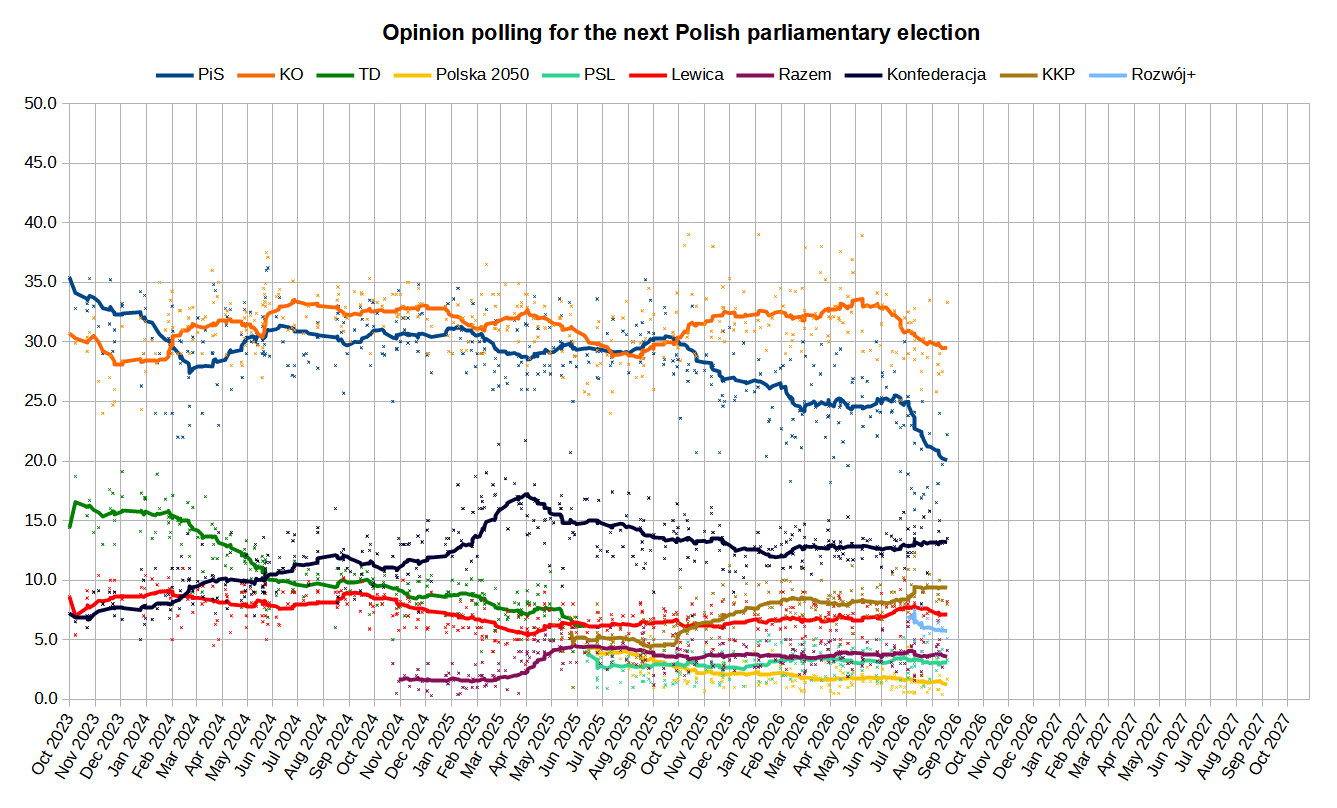

== Poll results ==
Poll results are listed in the tables below in reverse chronological order, showing the most recent first, and using the date the survey's fieldwork was done, as opposed to the date of publication. If such date is unknown, the date of publication is given instead. The highest percentage figure in each polling survey is displayed in bold, and the background shaded in the leading party's colour. In the instance that there is a tie, then no figure is shaded. The lead column on the right shows the percentage-point difference between the two parties with the highest figures. When a specific poll does not show a data figure for a party, the party's cell corresponding to that poll is shown empty.

=== 2026 ===
Polling firm/Link	Fieldwork date	Sample size	PiS	KO	Polska 2050	PSL	Lewica	Razem	Konfederacja	KKP	R+	Others	Don't know	Lead
Pollster / "SE.pl"	18–19 Nov	1,018	23.74	**31.83**	1.98	5.04	8.53	4.26	13.55	6.16	4.40	0.51		8.09
Research Partner	13–16 Nov	1,040	23.1	**28.0**	1.9	1.9	6.8	4.0	12.1	6.5	3.0	3.3	9.5	4.9
Pollster / "SE.pl"	9–10 Nov	1,052	22.09	**34.06**	1.59	3.34	7.01	4.46	13.15	8.52	4.42	1.36 (Note: Centre Union – 0.43)		11.97
Social Changes / wPolsce24, wPolityce.pl	6–10 Nov	1,095	26.1	**30.0**	2.9	1.6	8.3	4.7	11.7	9.4	3.6	1.6		3.9
United Surveys / WP.pl	6–9 Nov	1,000	15.5	**30.0**	0.8	4.5	6.8	3.1	14.0	9.1	6.1		10.1	14.5
IBRiS / Rz	6–7 Nov	1,069	16.5	**29.0**	0.4	4.2	7.6	4.1	13.2	10.5	6.0		8.5	12.5
OGB	26 Oct – 5 Nov	2,000	23.15	**37.07**	1.66	3.25	4.84	3.06	13.34	8.70	4.93			13.92
CBOS	2–4 Nov	1,000	15.8	**28.1**	1.1	1.8	5.9	3.4	15.4	7.8	2.8	1.9 (Note: Centre Union – 0.2)	14.2	12.3
Opinia24	2–4 Nov	1,001	20.1	**31.8**	2.5	2.7	6.4	5.5	12.2	7.7	4.8	0.8	5.5	11.7
United Surveys / WP.pl	2 Nov	1,000	18.2	**27.2**	0.0	2.9	7.1	3.8	13.3	11.6	5.2		10.7	9.0
	30 Oct	**Constitutional Tribunal crisis escalates**												
Pollster / "SE.pl"	26–27 Oct	1,029	22.35	**33.44**	2.65	3.49	7.10	4.27	12.24	7.84	5.19	1.43 (Note: Centre Union – 0.55)		11.09
IPSOS / "19:30" TVP Info	21–22 Oct	1,000	26	**34**	1	5	6	4	10	8	4	1		8
Pollster	19–21 Oct	1,014	22.06	**33.54**	1.72	3.44	7.77	5.14	12.18	8.03	5.61	0.51 (Note: Centre Union – 0.15)		11.48
Social Changes / wPolsce24, wPolityce.pl	18–19 Oct	1,095	26.4	**30.7**	1.5	2.8	7.9	3.6	13.2	7.3	4.9	1.7		4.3
United Surveys / WP.pl	16–18 Oct	1,000	17.2	**29.7**	0.4	4.4	7.3	3.2	13.2	10.0	6.2		8.4	12.5
IBRiS / Polsat News	14–16 Oct	1,000	19.1	**27.8**	0.5	5.1	7.0	3.8	12.7	11.4	5.8		6.8	8.7
OGB / Liberté!	1–13 Oct	2,000	25.03	**35.91**	1.29	2.16	6.12	2.75	11.80	11.31	3.63			10.88
CBOS	5–8 Oct	1,000	18.2	**28.6**	1.2	2.8	3.0	4.9	12.8	7.3	3.8	0.9 (Note: Centre Union – 0.4)	14.0	10.4
Pollster / "SE.pl"	6–7 Oct	1,018	22.55	**33.48**	1.80	3.21	7.80	4.04	13.29	7.33	5.28	1.22 (Note: Centre Union – 0.27)		10.93
Opinia24	5–7 Oct	1,001	17.3	**33.1**	2.2	2.0	6.5	3.5	13.8	7.6	5.3	1.4	7.3	15.8
United Surveys / WP.pl	2–4 Oct	1,000	18.0	**30.6**	0.5	4.4	7.4	3.9	14.1	9.0	5.7		6.4	12.6
SW Research / Klub Jagielloński, Instytut Sobieskiego	28–30 Sep	1,002	19.8	**33.7**		3.0	7.0	5.6	14.3	10.2	6.0	0.3		13.9
Pollster / "SE.pl"	21–22 Sep	1,029	22.59	**32.17**	1.54	3.59	7.66	4.97	14.17	7.28	5.20	0.83 (Note: Centre Union – 0.22)		9.58
OGB	18–22 Sep	1,000	22.60	**36.50**	1.41	1.09	6.85	3.16	13.85	9.43	5.11			13.90
Social Changes / wPolityce.pl	18–22 Sep	1,095	24.1	**30.9**	1.7	1.6	9.4	5.2	14.4	6.7	3.5	2.5		6.8
Research Partner	18–21 Sep	1,040	19.2	**28.8**	1.9	1.9	6.8	4.2	11.2	8.8	4.1	1.7	11.5	9.6
United Surveys / WP.pl	18–20 Sep	1,000	17.2	**31.5**	0.5	3.8	8.8	3.2	12.9	10.9	5.3		5.9	14.3
IBRiS / Rz	18–19 Sep	1,070	17.3	**30.9**	0.2	4.4	7.6	3.1	15.3	10.0	6.4		4.8	13.6
Social Changes	11–14 Sep	1,095	25.0	**30.4**	1.2	3.5	8.6	4.5	11.5	8.9	4.8	1.6		5.4
CBOS	7–9 Sep	1,000	15.0	**26.1**	0.8	2.5	5.9	6.1	14.8	7.8	3.7	0.8 (Note: Centre Union – 0.1)	14.3	11.1
Opinia24	7–9 Sep	1,001	17.5	**31.4**	1.4	2.2	7.2	4.2	12.6	6.9	5.7	0.5	10.4	13.9
United Surveys / WP.pl	4–6 Sep	1,000	19.2	**30.2**	0.5	3.7	6.6	4.0	15.1	6.8	6.0		7.9	11.0
Pollster / "SE.pl"	1–2 Sep	1,008	22.23	**33.34**	1.66	3.31	8.23	4.06	13.54	8.02	5.14	0.47 (Note: Centre Union – 0.33)		11.11
IBRiS / Onet	25–27 Aug	1,100	19.7	**27.5**	0.4	4.2	8.3	2.7	13.1	8.3	6.0		9.9	7.8
Social Changes / wPolsce24	21–24 Aug	1,094	24	**29**	2	3	7	5	15	10	4	1		5
United Surveys / WP.pl	21–23 Aug	1,000	20.6	**27.3**	0.8	3.0	7.1	4.0	14.1	8.4	6.5		8.2	6.7
IBRiS / Rz	21–22 Aug	1,067	18.1	**28.1**	0.8	3.5	6.6	4.6	13.2	8.8	6.4		9.9	10.0
CBOS	17–20 Aug	1,000	16.5	**25.8**	3.4	2.4	3.8	4.4	13.0	8.2	3.6	0.5 (Note: Centre Union – 0.2)	15.9	9.3
OGB	5–12 Aug	1,000	22.34	**33.53**	0.94	1.74	5.99	3.64	15.82	10.51	5.49			11.19
United Surveys / WP.pl	7–9 Aug	1,000	17.8	**28.7**	0.6	4.8	7.2	3.5	10.6	9.6	6.8	0.0	10.3	10.9
Opinia24	3–5 Aug	1,001	17.2	**30.3**	1.3	1.1	7.0	4.8	15.3	9.0	5.3	1.1	7.6	13.1
Social Changes / Interia	31 Jul – 3 Aug	1,095	25	**29**	2	3	9	4	13	9	4			4
IBRiS / Polsat News	29 Jul – 2 Aug	1,000	16.9	**27.5**	1.4	4.0	7.6	2.3	14.4	9.4	7.8		8.8	10.6
ARC Rynek i Opinia	28 Jul – 2 Aug	812	21	**26**	1	2	5	2	8	6	4	1	25	5
IBRiS / Rz	24–25 Jul	1,000	17.3	**30.1**	0.5	2.8	7.0	1.6	12.3	10.9	7.4	0.0	10.1	12.8
Pollster / "SE.pl"	24–25 Jul	1,013	21.52	**31.76**	2.14	3.72	7.71	4.73	13.40	9.06	4.90	1.06 (Note: Centre Union – 0.59)		10.24
United Surveys / WP.pl	24–25 Jul	1,000	15.9	**28.5**	0.6	3.3	7.8	1.9	13.5	12.3	7.5		8.7	12.6
	24 Jul	**Development Plus association and its MPs split from Law and Justice**												
Opinia24 / "Fakty" TVN, TVN24	Jul	–	23.0	**31.6**	1.4	2.7	6.8	4.4	12.3	9.6		2.5	3.2	8.6
United Surveys / WP.pl	16–17 Jul	1,000	18.9	**29.0**	0.6	3.8	8.3	2.5	12.0	10.9	6.9 (Note: Hypothetical scenario of R+ contesting the election outside of PiS)		7.1	10.1
Pollster / "SE.pl"	16–17 Jul	1,021	25.41	**32.48**	3.99	2.22	7.57	6.06	14.26	7.26		0.75		7.07
Social Changes / wPolsce24	10–13 Jul	1,090	30	**32**	1	3	10	3	11	8		2		2
United Surveys / WP.pl	10–12 Jul	1,000	23.0	**28.6**	0.6	5.2	7.5	4.0	15.7	10.2			5.2	5.6
CBOS	6–8 Jul	1,001	19.1	**25.1**	1.1	3.6	5.3	4.1	15.2	8.2		0.3 (Note: Centre – 0.1)	15.7	6.0
Opinia24	6–8 Jul	1,000	22.8	**31.3**	1.7	1.6	9.2	3.0	13.4	8.0		0.9	8.1	8.5
IBRiS / Rz	2–3 Jul	1,071	23.2	**29.1**	1.0	3.9	8.4	2.3	13.3	11.0		0.2 (Note: Centre – 0.2)	7.6	5.9
Pollster / "SE.pl"	30 Jun – 1 Jul	1,042	27.54	**32.62**	2.16	3.78	7.29	4.29	13.38	7.99		0.95		5.08
United Surveys / WP.pl	26–28 Jun	1,000	24.2	**29.2**	1.1	4.1	7.8	2.8	10.7	10.5			10.0	5.0
IBRiS / Polsat News	24–27 Jun	1,000	24.1	**28.0**	0.8	4.1	8.2	3.1	13.7	9.0		0.1 (Note: Centre – 0.1)	8.9	3.9
Pollster / "SE.pl"	19–21 Jun	1,045	26.17	**34.01**	1.61	3.55	7.82	4.58	13.93	7.66		0.67		7.84
Pollster / NCZAS	Jun	1,000	27.13	**33.05**	2.64	3.64	7.97	5.93	12.18	6.69		0.78		5.92
Pollster / NCZAS	Jun	1,000	27.37	**32.72**	2.51	3.65	8.06	5.77	12.00	7.25 (Note: as "Confederation of the Polish Crown of Grzegorz Braun" to help voters with party identification)		0.67		5.35
Research Partner	12–15 Jun	1,067	25.3	**31.5**	1.3	1.4	8.9	3.2	11.1	6.7		1.2	9.4	6.2
United Surveys / WP.pl	12–14 Jun	1,000	24.1	**29.7**	1.4	5.0	7.1	3.1	12.2	9.6			7.7	5.6
CBOS	8–10 Jun	1,000	22.1	**28.5**	1.3	1.5	3.9	4.0	12.8	9.4		0.2	14.5	6.4
Opinia24	8–10 Jun	1,000	24.2	**34.1**	1.8	2.7	7.5	3.2	12.6	7.5		1.4	5.0	9.9
Social Changes / Interia	5–9 Jun	1,073	30	**33**	2	2	8	5	12	7		1		3
IBRiS / Polsat News	29 May – 2 Jun	1,000	23.7	**29.3**	1.5	4.2	8.1	2.9	13.4	8.0			8.9	5.6
Pollster / "SE.pl"	28–29 May	1,057	26.66	**32.98**	2.71	4.25	7.76	4.78	13.29	7.03		0.54		6.32
United Surveys / WP.pl	22–24 May	1,000	22.9	**29.2**	1.5	4.1	8.1	3.3	13.5	8.2			9.2	6.3
IBRiS / Rz	22–23 May	1,000	25.4	**30.9**	2.1	3.9	8.4	2.8	12.6	8.8			5.1	5.5
OGB	12–23 May	1,000	27.03	**38.89**	1.90	2.39	5.20	3.51	11.76	9.32				11.86
OGB	28 Apr – 11 May	1,000	26.63	**36.89**	1.15	2.14	6.02	2.50	13.08	11.23				10.26
Pollster / "SE.pl"	May	–	26.89	**35.84**	2.31	4.25	7.18	5.45	11.74	5.54		0.80		8.95
United Surveys / WP.pl	8–10 May	1,000	24.0	**32.5**	1.4	4.1	6.8	3.1	13.1	9.1			5.9	8.5
Opinia24	4–6 May	1,002	24.8	**33.8**	3.0	1.9	7.0	1.9	11.7	7.8		0.6	7.5	9.0
CBOS	4–6 May	1,000	19.6	**30.8**	1.0	2.2	4.7	3.0	15.3	8.1		0.4	11.6	11.2
Opinia24 / GW	27–30 Apr	1,002	21.6	**31.6**	2.2	2.8	7.0	3.5	12.2	8.2		3.1	7.9	10.0
IBRiS / Rz	Apr	1,068	23.2	**32.0**	0.5	4.4	8.7	4.0	12.0	7.9			7.3	8.8
OGB	16–27 Apr	1,000	29.41	**37.61**	1.66	1.71	4.61	3.35	13.24	8.26		0.15		8.20
United Surveys / WP.pl	24–26 Apr	1,000	24.5	**31.8**	1.1	4.6	8.5	3.8	12.6	6.8			6.3	7.3
Pollster / "SE.pl"	21–22 Apr	1,005	29.00	**32.97**	2.67	3.70	6.65	5.81	12.45	6.29		0.46		3.97
Social Changes / Interia	17–20 Apr	1,090	28	**33**	2	2	7	5	12	9		2		5
United Surveys / WP.pl	17–19 Apr	1,000	20.3	**32.1**	0.5	3.1	7.8	3.2	13.2	8.5	5.1		6.2	11.8
CBOS	13–15 Apr	1,000	18.2	**32.0**	0.7	3.0	5.8	4.9	13.0	8.7		0.2	10.8	13.8
Research Partner / BS	10–13 Apr	1,070	24.6	**30.0**	4.2	3.3	7.3	4.8	13.3	8.7		3.8 (Note: Bezpartyjni Samorządowcy – 2.5)		5.4
IBRiS / Polsat News	8–13 Apr	–	23.8	**32.1**	1.2	4.2	7.1	3.1	15.0	8.2			5.3	8.3
United Surveys / WP.pl	10–12 Apr	1,000	23.7	**30.5**	1.6	3.7	8.0	4.2	14.2	8.4			5.7	6.8
Opinia24	7–9 Apr	1,002	22.0	**35.2**	3.1	1.9	6.9	4.6	12.8	6.6		0.7	6.2	13.2
OGB	25 Mar – 4 Apr	1,000	29.77	**37.99**	1.04	1.57	4.92	3.29	11.42	10.00				8.22
Pollster / "SE.pl"	2–3 Apr	1,011	27.28	**35.75**	1.75	3.86	5.97	4.72	12.00	7.04		1.63		8.47
United Surveys / WP.pl	27–29 Mar	1,000	23.3	**31.1**	1.9	5.1	7.8	3.5	12.6	8.0			6.7	7.8
IBRiS / Rz	27–28 Mar	1,067	24.5	**32.4**	1.8	4.5	7.9	2.9	13.4	7.5			5.1	7.9
Social Changes / wPolsce24	16–26 Mar	1,000	28	**32**	2	4.5	8	4	13	5			3.5	4
Research Partner	20–23 Mar	1,080	26.4	**30.6**	1.7	1.6	6.7	2.9	10.5	7.7		1.7	10.2	4.2
OGB	11–16 Mar	1,000	28.82	**37.91**	1.36	2.32	5.30	2.35	12.90	9.04				9.09
United Surveys / WP.pl	13–15 Mar	1,000	25.0	**32.6**	0.7	4.2	6.7	2.2	14.7	8.5			5.4	7.6
IBRiS / Polsat News	13–15 Mar	1,000	24.7	**31.1**	1.4	4.8	6.1	3.2	13.6	8.2			7.0	6.4
Social Changes / wPolsce24	11–13 Mar	1,084	30	**32**	3	3	9	4	11	7		1		2
Opinia24 / "Fakty" TVN, TVN24	11–12 Mar	1,002	23.9	**34.5**	1.8	2.4	5.1	4.6	11.6	7.1		1.9	4.9	10.6
CBOS	9–11 Mar	1,000	21.1	**29.2**	0.7	3.2	3.5	3.8	11.1	11.0		0.7	12.5	8.1
IBRiS / Onet	9 Mar	1,000	24.2	**31.8**	0.9	4.6	6.9	2.1	14.2	8.0			7.3	7.6
	7 Mar	**Przemysław Czarnek is named as the Law and Justice candidate for the office of Prime Minister for the next Polish parliamentary election**												
Opinia24	2–4 Mar	1,001	22.0	**34.2**	1.6	3.0	6.1	4.1	14.5	7.2		0.6	6.8	12.2
United Surveys / WP.pl	27 Feb – 1 Mar	1,000	23.5	**30.6**	1.1	3.8	7.7	4.2	12.2	8.4			8.5	7.1
IBRiS / Rz	27–28 Feb	1,073	22.1	**30.1**	1.5	4.2	6.8	3.4	13.8	9.2			8.9	8.0
Pollster / "SE.pl"	25–26 Feb	988	28.45	**34.25**	2.61	3.22	7.69	5.01	11.06	7.32		0.39		5.80
CBOS	23–26 Feb	1,000	18.3	**29.6**	2.0	1.7	4.6	3.7	13.4	9.9		0.1	15.1	11.3
United Surveys / WP.pl	20–21 Feb	1,000	21.5	**30.7**	1.0	5.0	7.5	2.5	13.2	10.0		0.6 (Note: Centre – 0.6)	8.0	9.2
IPSOS / "19:30" TVP Info	19–20 Feb	1,000	26	**29**	2	2	6	5	14	7		1	8	3
	18 Feb	**Fifteen MPs leave Poland 2050 to form Centre**												
Social Changes / wPolsce24	6–17 Feb	1,098	28	**33**	2	2	9	3	11	10		2 (Note: Free Republicans – 1)		5
United Surveys / WP.pl	13–15 Feb	1,000	22.7	**32.5**	2.0	4.8	8.0	3.1	13.0	9.9			4.0	9.8
OGB	9–14 Feb	1,000	27.81	**34.50**	2.84	2.55	5.86	3.07	14.38	8.99				6.69
Social Changes / wPolsce24	Feb	–	27.5	**33.8**	1.4	4.6	6.8	3.3	12.8	6.5			3.3	6.3
Opinia24	2–4 Feb	1,000	24.5	**32.0**	4.1	1.7	6.3	3.7	12.6	7.7		0.5	6.9	7.5
United Surveys / WP.pl	30 Jan – 1 Feb	1,000	23.5	**32.3**	2.1	4.9	6.6	3.7	11.2	7.7			8.0	8.8
	31 Jan	**Katarzyna Pełczyńska-Nałęcz is elected as leader of Poland 2050**												
IBRiS / Rz	30–31 Jan	1,067	23.3	**31.4**	1.7	5.4	8.1	3.6	12.6	9.0			4.9	8.1
CBOS	26–28 Jan	1,000	20.4	**29.3**	1.3	1.4	5.8	4.9	11.2	9.8		0.6	12.8	8.9
IBRiS / Onet	20–21 Jan	1,100	27.3	**31.2**	1.4	4.9	6.8	2.8	12.8	6.6			6.2	3.9
OGB	12–19 Jan	1,000	28.47	**39.04**	1.23	1.53	4.51	3.33	12.25	9.64				10.57
United Surveys / WP.pl	16–18 Jan	1,000	26.2	**31.8**	2.3	4.8	5.9	2.7	14.0	7.1			5.2	5.6
Opinia24	12–14 Jan	1,001	25.8	**30.9**	4.0	3.3	7.1	2.7	12.8	7.4		0.8	5.2	5.1
United Surveys / WP.pl	2–4 Jan	1,000	25.9	**30.9**	2.0	3.2	8.2	4.4	11.2	9.7			4.5	5.0
IBRiS / Rz	2–3 Jan	1,068	26.7	**31.6**	1.1	3.7	7.5	3.6	12.0	8.8			5.0	4.9
Pollster / "SE.pl"	31 Dec – 1 Jan	1,002	29.88	**34.20**	3.21	1.11	7.37	4.58	10.15	7.22		2.18		4.32
2023 parliamentary election	15 Oct	21,596,674 (Note: Turnout: 74.38%)	**35.38**	30.70	14.40		8.61		7.16			3.72 (Note: Bezpartyjni Samorządowcy: 1.86% There is One Poland: 1.63% German Minority Electoral Committee: 0.12% Prosperity and Peace Movement: 0.12% Normal Country: 0.02% Anti-party: 0.01% Repair Poland Movement: 0.003%)		4.69

=== 2025 ===
Polling firm/Link	Fieldwork date	Sample size	PiS	KO	Polska 2050	PSL	Lewica	Razem	Konfederacja	KKP	Others	Don't know	Lead
Opinia24 / "Fakty" TVN, TVN24	Dec	1,000	25.4	**32.8**	2.1	2.6	4.9	3.5	10.7	8.6	1.3	5.6	7.4
United Surveys / WP.pl	19–21 Dec	1,000	25.1	**31.5**	1.0	4.9	7.2	2.4	12.1	8.1		7.7	6.4
Social Changes / wPolsce24	Dec	1,000	29	**31**	4	4	8	5	9	6		4	2
OGB	9–15 Dec	1,000	31.21	**35.29**	1.66	1.71	4.95	3.33	10.67	11.18			4.08
Ipsos / Radio ZET	5–9 Dec	1,000	25	**30**	3	3	7	6	13	7		7	5
United Surveys / WP.pl	5–8 Dec	1,000	26.7	**32.8**	1.0	3.1	7.1	2.8	13.1	8.4		5.0	6.1
Pollster / "SE.pl"	6–7 Dec	1,008	30.94	**34.64**	2.98	2.02	6.97	4.65	10.85	6.67	0.28		3.70
Opinia24 / "GW"	4–7 Dec	1,001	24.6	**32.9**	1.8	2.4	4.7	2.5	13.2	9.6	3.0	5.5	8.3
IBRiS / Polsat News	4–6 Dec	1,000	25.5	**30.9**	1.5	4.0	8.2	3.6	13.6	7.1		5.7	5.4
CBOS	1–3 Dec	1,000	20.7	**30.3**	2.0	1.4	5.2	3.8	12.5	7.0	0.4	14.3	9.6
Opinia24	1–3 Dec	1,000	25.1	**31.7**	2.8	1.2	6.6	4.6	14.6	6.2	1.0	6.2	6.6
OGB	22–25 Nov	1,000	27.97	**38.01**	1.44	2.68	4.24	2.75	13.97	8.94			10.04
United Surveys / WP.pl	21–23 Nov	1,000	26.4	**30.9**	1.5	3.0	7.9	3.1	15.6	6.4		5.2	4.5
IBRiS / Rz	21–23 Nov	1,075	27.1	**30.4**	1.7	3.2	7.2	3.9	16.1	5.1		5.2	3.3
Pollster / "SE.pl"	15–17 Nov	1,003	28.86	**33.55**	4.55	2.48	6.91	4.84	11.45	5.92	1.39		4.69
IBRiS / Onet	14–15 Nov	1,100	27.6	**31.5**	0.7	3.9	7.0	3.6	14.1	7.3		4.3	3.9
CBOS	3–5 Nov	1,000	20.7	**28.8**	1.8	1.4	3.5	3.3	13.2	8.5	0.1	16.1	8.1
Opinia24	3–5 Nov	1,000	27.4	**33.0**	1.7	1.4	6.3	3.1	12.6	5.9	0.5	8.1	5.6
Research Partner	31 Oct – 3 Nov	1,090	27.6	**29.0**	3.0	1.1	7.1	2.9	11.6	6.4	1.5	9.8	1.4
Social Changes / wPolsce24	Oct	–	33	**34**	3	4	8	5	7	6			1
OGB	23–27 Oct	1,000	28.07	**39.00**	2.89	2.17	4.48	2.25	14.26	6.88			10.93
United Surveys / WP.pl	24–26 Oct	1,000	26.7	**30.8**	1.5	4.8	6.9	3.4	11.9	6.4		6.6	4.1
	25 Oct	**The Civic Coalition's largest components unite into a single party**											
IBRiS / Rz	24–25 Oct	1,067	27.6	**30.4**	1.3	4.1	6.7	4.0	15.0	5.5	0.0	5.4	2.8
OGB	15–22 Oct	1,000	29.81	**38.12**	1.61	2.78	4.13	2.03	15.50	6.02			8.31
CBOS	15–17 Oct	1,000	23.6	**28.4**	2.3	2.1	4.8	4.2	10.9	9.4	0.9	10.2	4.8
Opinia24 / "Fakty" TVN, TVN24	13–14 Oct	1,001	28.5	**29.5**	1.7	2.3	5.4	5.2	14.4	6.4	0.7	4.7	1.0
OGB	8–13 Oct	1,000	27.91	**34.05**	2.37	3.67	4.18	4.29	16.43	7.10			6.14
Pollster / "SE.pl"	11–12 Oct	1,002	29.91	**32.53**	3.61	1.37	7.34	5.46	13.23	6.16			2.62
United Surveys / WP.pl	10–12 Oct	1,000	28.9	**29.8**	1.6	3.9	7.3	2.4	13.9	6.2		6.0	0.9
IBRiS / Onet	8–9 Oct	1,100	27.3	**30.5**	1.6	4.6	7.1	2.9	14.1	6.1		5.9	3.2
Opinia24	6–8 Oct	1,000	28.4	**30.8**	3.0	1.3	5.4	4.5	15.0	5.3	0.4	6.1	2.4
Research Partner	26–29 Sep	1,070	**32.4**	29.9	3.1	1.2	7.4	3.6	12.8	6.3	3.3 (Note: New Wave – 1.6, Nonpartisans – 0.4)		2.5
Pollster / "SE.pl"	27–28 Sep	1,026	**32.87**	31.12	4.14	1.60	6.68	4.52	11.81	6.66	0.60		1.75
United Surveys / WP.pl	26–28 Sep	1,000	28.5	**30.0**	2.0	4.7	7.0	2.2	14.7	4.1		6.8	1.5
IBRiS / Rz	26–27 Sep	1,073	28.1	**28.7**	1.0	4.1	7.6	2.6	13.4	5.7	0.0	8.8	0.6
United Surveys / WP.pl	13–15 Sep	1,000	30.7	**32.3**	1.0	3.8	6.8	1.2	13.8	4.5		5.9	1.6
Social Changes / wPolsce24	12–15 Sep	1,120	**29**	26	4	6	6	2	9	5	1	12	3
Pollster / "SE.pl"	10–11 Sep	1,020	**33.53**	31.94	5.31	1.35	6.71	4.20	12.46	4.17	0.33		1.59
OGB	2–9 Sep	1,000	30.82	**34.52**	2.22	1.72	4.74	2.64	16.86	6.48			3.70
Social Changes / wPolityce.pl	29 Aug – 5 Sep	1,000	**35.2**	30.3	2.7	5.0	6.3	3.3	11.4	3.7		2.1	4.9
CBOS	1–3 Sep	1,000	**30**	28	3	2	5	6	11	4	0	11	2
Opinia24	1–3 Sep	1,003	**28.6**	**28.6**	2.9	1.5	5.6	3.9	15.0	6.7	0.2	7.0	Tie
Pollster / "SE.pl"	30 Aug – 1 Sep	1,000	31.63	**32.60**	3.45	1.48	7.32	5.49	12.55	5.11	0.37		0.97
United Surveys / WP.pl	28 Aug – 1 Sep	1,000	**29.0**	27.1	3.4	3.9	7.4	3.2	13.2	3.1		9.7	1.8
IBRiS / Rz	29–30 Aug	1,069	**30.6**	29.9	2.1	3.6	8.0	3.7	15.1	2.8		4.2	0.7
IBRiS / Onet	29–30 Aug	1,100	28.3	**28.5**	2.3	4.1	8.1	4.2	14.4	3.4	6.7		0.2
Research Partner	22–25 Aug	1,040	**31.4**	27.0	2.9	1.9	6.3	2.9	11.3	3.5	0.5	12.3	4.4
CBOS	18–21 Aug	1,000	**30**	**30**	2	1	7	5	12	3	0	9	Tie
United Surveys / WP.pl	13–16 Aug	1,000	27.4	**28.1**	2.6	3.6	5.5	3.1	17.3	3.1		9.3	0.7
OGB	6–13 Aug	1,000	30.59	**33.37**	3.55	3.44	5.03	3.30	15.38	5.34			2.78
Pollster / "SE.pl"	8–9 Aug	1,006	30.88	**32.04**	5.18	2.40	6.98	4.67	12.84	4.91	0.20		1.16
Opinia24	4–6 Aug	1,003	**29.0**	28.2	3.4	1.4	5.9	4.1	14.2	6.0	0.7	7.1	0.8
Pollster / "SE.pl"	25–28 Jul	1,047	31.94	**32.14**	4.90	3.18	6.20	4.35	11.98	4.79	0.52		0.20
United Surveys / WP.pl	25–27 Jul	1,000	**28.3**	25.8	4.1	3.7	6.7	3.6	17.4	5.4		5.1	2.5
IBRiS / Rz	25–26 Jul	1,067	28.7	**30.1**	2.8	3.6	7.1	3.1	14.6	4.6	1.1	4.3	1.4
IPSOS / "19:30" TVP Info	24–25 Jul	1,000	**28**	24	5	4	6	6	14	5	1	7	4
Research Partner	18–21 Jul	1,080	**30.7**	28.9	4.2	0.9	5.8	2.5	12.4	3.8	1.4 (Note: Bezpartyjni Samorządowcy – 0.5)	9.5	1.8
United Surveys / WP.pl	11–13 Jul	1,000	**29.2**	28.2	2.8	3.5	6.8	3.0	12.5	4.2		9.8	1.0
OGB	4–11 Jul	1,000	26.85	**31.66**	3.38	3.13	6.62	4.39	16.70	7.27			4.81
Pollster / "SE.pl"	8–9 Jul	1,085	**33.55**	31.17	3.78	1.58	7.25	4.95	12.83	4.79	0.10		2.38
CBOS	7–9 Jul	1,000	27	**28**	3	1	6	6	12	8		10	1
Opinia24	7–9 Jul	1,003	29.2	**29.3**	4.7	1.8	5.0	3.9	14.9	5.6	0.4	5.2	0.1
United Surveys / WP.pl	27–29 Jun	1,000	**28.3**	25.6	4.4	4.1	6.6	5.0	15.0	3.9		7.1	2.7
IBRiS / Rz	26–27 Jun	1,067	**28.9**	26.5	3.8	3.2	5.6	4.8	16.8	4.0		6.4	2.4
IBRiS / Onet	23–24 Jun	1,100	**30.5**	25.8	4.6	4.0	6.1	3.9	16.8	5.1		3.2	4.7
	17 June	**The Third Way is dissolved as an electoral alliance**											
IBRiS / Polsat News	12–14 Jun	1,000	27.9	**28.8**	6.9		5.6	3.1	14.7	6.0		7.0	0.9
Opinia24	9–12 Jun	1,003	**28.8**	**28.8**	5.1		6.1	4.6	13.8	6.9	0.9	5.0	Tie
CBOS	9–10 Jun	1,000	25	**30**	4		8	6	14	1	1	10	5
United Surveys / WP.pl	6–8 Jun	1,000	30.0	**33.0**	5.5		6.0	5.2	16.0		0.1	4.2	3.0
IBRiS / Rz	6–7 Jun	1,069	28.3	**32.3**	5.1		6.3	3.1	20.7		0.2	4	4
Pollster / NCZAS	5–6 Jun	1,029	**33.3**	30.5	5.1		5.1	5.5	13.5	6.9	0.1		2.8
Presidential election II round	1 June	20,844,163	**50.89**	49.11	Endorsed **Civic Coalition**			No endorsement		Endorsed **Law and Justice**			1.78
Social Changes / Radio Wnet	28–29 May	1,060	**28**	27	6		8	3	11	4	2	11	1
Research Partner	27–28 May	1,060	**29.6**	29.2	4.2		6.3	4.0	9.5	5.2	0.6	11.3	0.4
IBRiS / Onet	26–27 May	1,070	32.2	**33.4**	6.0		5.0	2.5	17.1		0.9	2.7	1.2
Opinia24 / RMF FM	25–27 May	1,000	27.2	**31.1**	4.1		5.9	5.5	16.0		2.5	7.7	3.9
Opinia24 / Radio ZET	23–26 May	1,021	30	**32**	6		6	4	16		1	5	2
Pollster / "SE.pl"	25 May	1,011	**33.61**	32.04	6.68		6.01	4.43	16.43		0.80		1.57
Presidential election I round	18 May	19,603,784	29.54	**31.36**	4.99		4.23	4.86	14.81	6.34	3.87		1.82
Opinia24 / RMF FM	12–14 May	1,003	27.3	**29.2**	10.7		6.3	4.9	15.2		0.3	6.1	1.9
IBRiS / Onet	12–13 May	1,072	31.2	**31.8**	8.0		7.5	3.6	11.2			6.7	0.6
CBOS	12–13 May	1,001	28	**29**	5		6	6	16		2	7	1
Pollster / "SE.pl"	7–8 May	1,077	**32.26**	31.11	9.51		5.91	5.35	15.13		0.73		1.15
United Surveys / WP.pl	7 May	1,000	27.5	**31.2**	7.4		7.6	3.9	13.1		0.5	8.8	3.7
Opinia24 / "Fakty" TVN, TVN24	6–7 May	1,012	28	**33**	7		8	4	15		1	2	5
Opinia24 / "Newsweek"	5–7 May	1,001	29	**33**	5		9	5	15				4
Pollster / "SE.pl"	28–29 Apr	1,007	31.05	**31.28**	9.60		5.90	4.91	16.66				0.23
United Surveys / WP.pl	28–29 Apr	1,000	27.3	**30.4**	8.8		6.8	3.9	14.4		1.0	7.4	3.1
OGB	23–25 Apr	1,000	**33.80**	33.31	7.96		5.42	2.89	16.62				0.49
Opinia24 / "Fakty" TVN, TVN24	24 Apr	–	26	**30**	8		6	5	18		3	3	4
CBOS	22–24 Apr	1,001	**32**	**32**	6		5	4	15		0	7	Tie
United Surveys / WP.pl	17–19 Apr	1,000	**29.6**	28.6	8.1		7.9	3.5	13.9			8.4	1.0
Pollster / "SE.pl"	15–16 Apr	1,003	31.36	**32.92**	9.11		5.88	3.17	15.39		2.17		1.56
IPSOS / "19:30" TVP Info	14–16 Apr	1,000	26	**28**	8		5	4	17		2	10	2
Opinia24	14–16 Apr	1,002	27.3	**34.0**	8.2		6.9	3.8	13.8		0.2	5.8	6.7
OGB	9–14 Apr	1,001	31.46	**33.95**	6.72		2.90	2.43	21.74				2.49
Opinia24 / RMF FM	7–9 Apr	1,000	28.3	**33.3**	7.5		5.6	3.2	16.4		0.9	4.8	5.0
CBOS	7–9 Apr	1,000	26	**33**	5		6	4	16		2	9	7
United Surveys / WP.pl	4–6 Apr	1,000	28.8	**34.9**	6.9		5.0	0.5	16.4			7.5	6.1
Opinia24 / Radio ZET	2–6 Apr	1,000	28	**30**	8		7	4	17		1	5	2
Pollster / Republika	3–4 Apr	1,003	31	**33**	9		5		17				2
Pollster / "SE.pl"	31 Mar – 1 Apr	1,007	31.76	**32.35**	8.06		5.02	3.48	18.08		1.25		0.59
Research Partner	21–24 Mar	1,060	29.1	**31.3**	6.9		7.4		14.3		1.9	9.1	2.2
United Surveys / WP.pl	21–23 Mar	1,000	26.5	**31.0**	6.7		4.7	0.8	16.4			13.9	4.5
Opinia24	17–21 Mar	1,000	27.0	**34.8**	7.1		4.6	2.4	18.5		0.7	4.9	7.8
IPSOS / "19:30" TVP Info	11–13 Mar	1,000	28	**31**	8		6	3	16		0	7	3
Opinia24 / RMF FM	10–13 Mar	1,000	26.3	**34.0**	6.7		4.8	2.4	21.4		0.2	4.3	7.7
	10 Mar	**Confederation of the Polish Crown MPs leave the Confederation parliamentary group**											
Pollster / "SE.pl"	7–9 Mar	1,015	31.82	**33.02**	9.25		5.72	1.65	17.17		1.37		1.20
United Surveys / WP.pl	7–9 Mar	1,000	28.6	**31.1**	5.8		4.9	1.1	17.2			11.3	2.5
IBRiS / Rz	7–8 Mar	1,068	27.5	**31.1**	5.8		4.5	1.9	17.1			12.1	3.6
CBOS	3–6 Mar	1,000	26	**34**	4		4	2	18		0	11	8
OGB	19–26 Feb	1,000	32.70	**36.52**	5.18		5.33	1.24	19.03				3.82
United Surveys / WP.pl	21–24 Feb	1,000	28.1	**32.3**	8.0		7.6	1.1	16.1		1.2	5.6	4.2
Research Partner	21–24 Feb	1,050	**29.4**	29.1	8.8		8.3		14.2		2.0	7.9	0.3
Ipsos / Liberté!	19–21 Feb	1,000	**29**	**29**	10		5	2	16		9		Tie
Opinia24	17–21 Feb	1,001	30.4	**31.3**	8.9		5.3	3.1	16.6		0.6	3.8	0.9
CBOS	17–20 Feb	1,002	29	**34**	4		6	2	17		0	8	5
IPSOS / "19:30" TVP Info	17–18 Feb	621	**30**	29	10		6	2	16		1	5	1
Opinia24 / RMF FM	10–13 Feb	1,002	27.9	**31.8**	8.0		5.5	2.9	18.7		0.7	4.6	3.9
Pollster / "SE.pl"	8–10 Feb	1,077	**33.21**	31.37	8.90		6.85	1.68	15.71		2.28		1.84
United Surveys / WP.pl	8–9 Feb	1,000	30.0	**32.1**	8.3		7.1	1.0	12.8			8.7	2.1
IBRiS / Rz	7–8 Feb	1,067	29.3	**33.5**	10.1		8.3	1.5	11.6		1.0	4.7	4.2
CBOS	3–5 Feb	1,000	**30**	**30**	6		6	2	13		1	13	Tie
IBRiS / Onet	31 Jan – 2 Feb	1,068	27.4	**29.3**	9.6		7.7	0.9	10.9		0.4	13.9	1.9
Opinia24 / Radio ZET	23–29 Jan	1,000	29	**32**	7		6	1	16		1	7	3
Research Partner	24–27 Jan	1,060	**31.0**	29.3	8.9		7.1		13.3		2.6	7.8	1.7
United Surveys / WP.pl	24–26 Jan	1,000	30.3	**32.0**	8.4		8.2	0.5	12.8			7.8	1.7
Opinia24	20–24 Jan	1,001	31.1	**31.3**	9.7		7.0	2.2	14.0		0.7	4.0	0.2
OGB	21–23 Jan	1,000	**34.46**	33.07	7.24		5.78	0.44	17.95		1.06		1.39
Pollster / "SE.pl"	17–18 Jan	1,004	**33.63**	31.63	8.65		6.05	1.59	14.24		4.21		2
IPSOS / "19:30" TVP Info	14–16 Jan	1,000	**29**	**29**	10		7	3	12		2	8	Tie
United Surveys / WP.pl	10–12 Jan	1,000	**32.4**	29.2	9.0		7.2	2.2	13.5		0.9	5.4	3.2
IBRiS / Rz	10–11 Jan	1,068	**33.2**	30.5	9.0		6.3	1.3	12.4		0.4	7.0	2.7
Opinia24 / RMF FM	7–9 Jan	1,000	30.7	**31.9**	8.6		5.6	2.0	13.5		0.5	7.3	1.2
CBOS	7–8 Jan	1,000	**33**	**33**	7		6	2	13		1	5	Tie
2023 parliamentary election	15 Oct	21,596,674	**35.38**	30.70	14.40		8.61		7.16		3.72		4.69

=== 2024 ===
Polling firm/Link	Fieldwork date	Sample size	PiS	KO	TD	Lewica	Razem	Konfederacja	PJJ	BS	Others	Don't know	Lead
United Surveys / WP.pl	20–22 Dec	1,000	27.4	**31.3**	10.4	9.0	0.3	9.9			0.7	11.0	3.9
IPSOS / TVP Info	17–18 Dec	–	**29**	**29**	10	6	3	15			1	7	Tie
Opinia24 / RMF FM	10–12 Dec	1,000	28.9	**31.9**	9.5	5.9	0.7	14.2			1.3	7.5	3.0
Pollster / "SE.pl"	10–11 Dec	1,005	32.38	**33.19**	8.11	7.34	1.47	13.18			4.33		0.81
United Surveys / WP.pl	6–8 Dec	1,000	32.3	**33.2**	9.9	8.0		10.3			0.0	6.3	0.9
IBRiS / Rz	6–7 Dec	1,071	**34.8**	34.5	8.6	7.4	0.8	7.3				6.6	0.3
Opinia24	3–6 Dec	1,001	29.2	**32.1**	9.9	6.7	2.5	13.7			1.5	4.4	2.9
CBOS	2–4 Dec	1,000	30	**33**	8	6	2	11			2	8	3
Pollster / "SE.pl"	25–26 Nov	1,015	30.45	**32.86**	9.11	8.21	1.12	13.06	1.60	2.39	1.20		2.41
Opinia24 / TVN24	24 Nov	1,000	32	**35**	7	7		13			2	4	3
United Surveys / WP.pl	22–24 Nov	1,000	29.9	**32.5**	9.7	8.5		10.5			0.0	8.9	2.6
CBOS	18–20 Nov	1,000	31	**32**	7	6	2	13			1	9	1
Opinia24 / Radio ZET	15–18 Nov	1,000	32	**33**	8	10		13				4	1
Opinia24	12–15 Nov	1,001	30.0	**34.0**	7.8	8.2		13.0			1.4	5.6	4.0
Pollster / "SE.pl"	12–13 Nov	1,044	**34.30**	32.32	7.68	5.82	1.53	13.51	0.97	3.00	0.87		1.98
Research Partner	8–11 Nov	1,080	29.4	**32.1**	9.4	7.2		10.2			2.7	9.1	2.7
United Surveys / WP.pl	8–10 Nov	1,000	31.7	**34.0**	8.8	7.1		10.8			0.5	7.1	2.3
United Surveys / DGP, RMF	8–10 Nov	1,000	29.4	**32.4**	10.8 (Note: Poland 2050 – 6.7, Polish People's Party – 4.1)	7.6	0.5	10.4				9.1	3.0
CBOS	4–6 Nov	1,000	25	**34**	5	7	3	12			1	14	9
	27 Oct	**Left Together leaves The Left alliance and joins the opposition**											
United Surveys / WP.pl	25–27 Oct	1,000	28.9	**33.6**	10.4	8.8		10.7				7.6	4.7
IBRiS / Rz	25–26 Oct	1,069	29.6	**31.3**	9.8	8.6		9.4			11.2		1.7
CBOS	21–24 Oct	1,000	29	**33**	8	7		11			1	11	4
Opinia24 / TVN24	15–18 Oct	1,001	32.4	**33.3**	7.9	8.8		12.2			0.4	5.0	0.9
IBRiS / "Wydarzenia" Polsat	11–14 Oct	1,000	**31.3**	30.7	9.3	7.3		9.8				11.5	0.6
United Surveys / WP.pl	11–13 Oct	1,000	33.3	**33.5**	10.1	7.8		9.5			0.0	5.8	0.2
CBOS	7–10 Oct	1,000	28	**29**	8	8		13			1	14	1
Opinia24 / "GW"	7–9 Oct	1,000	33.5	**35.3**	7.1	5.9		12.5				3.7	1.8
Pollster / "SE.pl"	5–6 Oct	1,007	31.40	**31.94**	10.69	8.72		13.69			3.56		0.54
Pollster / "19:30" TVP Info	29–30 Sep	1,047	31.90	**33.99**	10.51	9.92		12.44			1.24		2.09
United Surveys / WP.pl	27–29 Sep	1,000	29.5	**34.1**	11.1	8.7		10.5			0.6	5.5	4.6
IBRiS / Rz	27–28 Sep	1,067	32.9	**33.1**	10.1	7.4		9.1			1.0	6.4	0.2
United Surveys / WP.pl	20–21 Sep	1,000	31.0	**34.2**	10.5	8.7		8.4			0.0	7.2	3.2
Research Partner	13–16 Sep	1,040	**30.0**	**30.0**	9.1	8.8		10.7			2.6	8.8	Tie
CBOS	9–12 Sep	1,000	29	**32**	9	8		11			1	10	3
IBRiS / "Wydarzenia" Polsat	9–10 Sep	1,000	32.1	**32.9**	10.8	8.4		9.3				6.5	0.8
Pollster / "SE.pl"	7–8 Sep	1,061	31.64	**32.24**	8.82	10.21		12.61			4.48		0.60
Pollster / "SE.pl"	7–8 Sep	1,061	25.65	**30.86**	8.59	10.13		11.65			13.12 (Note: Hypothetical party of Andrzej Duda – 9.20)		5.21
Opinia24	3–5 Sep	1,000	30.8	**31.3**	10.5	9.1		12.3			0.7	5.3	0.5
Social Changes / wPolsce24	30 Aug – 2 Sep	1,190	33	**34**	11	9		11					1
United Surveys / WP.pl	30 Aug – 1 Sep	1,000	32.4	**34.6**	9.7	8.0		8.6			1.3	5.4	2.2
IBRiS / Rz	30–31 Aug	1,067	31.9	**33.5**	11.0	7.7		8.1				7.8	1.6
CBOS	26–29 Aug	1,000	28	**32**	6	9		16			1	9	4
Pollster / "SE.pl"	8 Aug	1,001	**31.62**	31.48	10.06	9.13		13.95			3.76		0.14
Pollster / "SE.pl"	8 Aug	1,001	30.41	**31.16**	10.47 (Note: Poland 2050 – 8.80, Polish People's Party – 1.67)	9.03		14.43			4.50		0.75
Opinia24	5–8 Aug	1,000	27.8	**33.9**	11.4	8.2		12.4			1.4	4.9	6.1
United Surveys / WP.pl	26–28 Jul	1,100	28.3	**33.0**	10.9	9.9		9.6			1.9	6.4	4.7
IBRiS / Onet	24–25 Jul	1,100	29.0	**32.1**	10.5	8.7		11.9			0.4	7.4	3.1
Research Partner	19–22 Jul	1,040	28.9	**30.7**	8.6	8.3		12.0		2.5	1.2	7.8	1.8
CBOS	8–11 Jul	1,000	28	**31**	9	11		12			0	9	3
Opinia24	8–11 Jul	1,000	27.1	**31.4**	11.6	9.0		13.8			2.4	4.6	4.3
Pollster / "SE.pl"	8–9 Jul	1,028	33.31	**35.06**	9.21	9.0		13.30			0.21		1.75
United Surveys / WP.pl	5–8 Jul	1,000	27.2	**31.2**	9.0	7.7		11.0			0.0	13.9	4.0
CBOS	1–3 Jul	1,000	28	**31**	10	8		14			0	10	3
CBOS	24–27 Jun	1,000	30	**32**	11	9		11			1	6	2
United Surveys / WP.pl	21–23 Jun	1,000	33.7	**34.4**	10.8	6.2		11.9			0.5	2.5	0.7
IBRiS / Rz	21–22 Jun	1,067	32.7	**34.0**	9.2	6.3		10.8			0.4	6.6	1.3
IBRiS / Onet	18–19 Jun	1,100	32.1	**33.8**	8.7	6.9		9.0			0.3	9.2	1.7
Opinia24	10–11 Jun	1,001	28.8	**33.2**	7.6	8.1		11.5	0.6	3.5	0.7	6.2	4.4
European Parliament election	9 Jun	11,761,994	36.16	**37.06**	6.91	6.30		12.08		0.93	0.56		0.90
IBRiS / Onet	3 Jun	1,067	31.3	**33.1**	11.6	8.2		9.0			0.2	6.6	1.8
Opinia24	27–28 May	1,001	**29.8**	29.7	11.2	8.3		11.6	1.0	3.6	0.5	4.3	0.1
IBRiS / Rz	23–24 May	1,068	30.3	**31.8**	12.7	8.9		7.0			0	9.3	1.5
CBOS	20–23 May	1,000	**30**	**30**	9	9		9			1	13	Tie
Pollster / "SE.pl"	19 May	1,031	**32.49**	32.15	10.87	9.33		9.46		3.16	2.54		0.34
Opinia24	13–14 May	1,000	30.1	**32.5**	13.3	7.0		12.1			1.7	3.3	2.4
Research Partner	10–13 May	1,051	**31.5**	29.7	11.4	9.1		9.1		1.5	0.5	7.2	1.8
United Surveys / WP.pl	10–12 May	1,000	**33.3**	32.0	11.6	9.0		9.8			0.1	4.2	1.3
CBOS	22–26 Apr	1,000	26	**28**	11	7		14			2	12	2
United Surveys / WP.pl	19–21 Apr	1,000	32.1	**32.6**	12.1	8.6		7.6				7.0	0.5
IBRiS / Rz	19–20 Apr	1,071	**31.4**	28.9	13.5	8.8		8.2			3.7	5.7	2.5
Pollster / "SE.pl"	18–19 Apr	1,074	**32.77**	32.31	11.17	9.23		9.64	1.75	2.89	0.24		0.4
CBOS	8–11 Apr	1,000	23	**35**	10	5		14			2	11	12
Opinia24	8–9 Apr	1,000	26.4	**33.8**	11.8	6.6		8.5	2.0	4.5	0.6	5.8	7.4
Local elections	7 Apr	14,417,065	**34.27**	30.59	14.25	6.32		7.23		3.01	4.33		3.68
OGB	3–5 Apr	1,000	**34.75**	33.34	13.02	4.47		10.38	1.76	2.28			1.41
IBRiS / Onet	4 Apr	1,068	29.0	**30.5**	11.8	9.5		8.4			1.9	8.9	1.5
Opinia24	2–3 Apr	–	29.1	**36.0**	14.7	8.3		10.4			1.5		6.9
IBRiS / Rz	22–23 Mar	1,067	30.0	**31.9**	10.7	9.5		8.6				9.3	1.9
CBOS	18–22 Mar	1,000	24	**29**	9	8		13			1	17	5
Pollster / "SE.pl"	16–17 Mar	1,072	**32.02**	30.81	13.57	9.19		9.88	1.34	2.79	0.40		1.21
Research Partner	8–11 Mar	1,088	29.1	**30.2**	9.0	8.5		8.0			2.4	12.8	1.1
Opinia24	6–7 Mar	1,000	24.6	**32.8**	14.2	9.3		10.1	1.3	2.3	0.7	4.7	8.2
CBOS	4–7 Mar	1,000	23	**29**	12	9		11			2	13	6
CBM Indicator / DoRzeczy.pl	1–6 Mar	1,001	27	**32**	15	10		10			6 (Note: Sovereign Poland – 4)		5
IPSOS / OKO.press, TOK FM	22–26 Feb	1,000	**30**	29	13	6		12	2	3	1	4	1
United Surveys / WP.pl	23–25 Feb	1,000	28.2	**32.6**	15.2	8.5		9.1			1.1	5.3	4.4
IBRiS / Rz	23–24 Feb	1,071	30.1	**32.6**	14.7	8.7		7.6				6.3	2.5
CBOS	19–22 Feb	1,000	22	**29**	15	7		11			2	14	7
Pollster / "19:30" TVP Info	15–16 Feb	1,034	30.85	**31.17**	17.07	8.20		8.06	2.23	1.74	0.68		0.32
IBSP / Stan Polityki	12–15 Feb	1,000	32.98	**34.20**	15.25	4.89		9.36	0.79	2.53			1.22
CBOS	12–15 Feb	1,000	24	**29**	11	8		11			2	15	5
Research Partner	9–12 Feb	1,081	**30.1**	29.8	13.6	9.3		6.8		1.6	1.1	7.7	0.3
Pollster / "SE.pl"	11 Feb	1,060	30.31	**32.32**	14.78	9.01		8.77	1.79	1.94	1.08		2.01
United Surveys / WP.pl	10–11 Feb	1,000	29.0	**31.7**	15.3	10.2		8.0			0.0	5.8	2.7
Opinia24	6–7 Feb	1,001	24.0	**31.0**	16.8	9.1		8.7	2.2	1.5	1.1	5.7	7.0
United Surveys / WP.pl	26–28 Jan	1,000	**28.3**	28.2	18.9	9.6		7.6			1.0	6.4	0.1
CBOS	22–26 Jan	1,000	24	**29**	14	9		11			5	9	5
Research Partner	19–22 Jan	1,119	**30.3**	30.1	13.5	10.1		6.7		2.2	1.1	6.0	0.2
Pollster / "SE.pl"	13–14 Jan	1,048	**32.78**	31.69	16.79	7.85		7.89	1.50	1.28	0.22		1.09
United Surveys / WP.pl	12–14 Jan	1,000	**28.4**	27.5	16.9	10.4		6.8			1.5	8.5	0.9
IBRiS / Rz	12–13 Jan	1,067	**33.9**	30.2	16.9	9.3		6.3			0.5	2.9	3.7
CBOS	8–12 Jan	1,000	**29**	**29**	10	7		10			4	12	Tie
Opinia24	8–9 Jan	1,002	**26.3**	24.3	17.3	9.4		10.9	0.9	1.7	0.3	8.9	2.0
IBRiS / Onet	5–8 Jan	1,000	**34.2**	32.0	14.1	8.8		5.0			0.9	5.0	2.2
2023 parliamentary election	15 Oct	21,596,674	**35.38**	30.70	14.40	8.61		7.16	1.63	1.86	0.23		4.69

=== 2023 ===
Polling firm/Link	Fieldwork date	Sample size	PiS	KO	TD	Lewica	Konfederacja	BS	PJJ	Others	Don't know	Lead
Pollster / “SE.pl”	17 Dec	1,033	33.15	31.28	16.95	8.37	6.73	1.46	1.74	0.32		1.87
United Surveys / WP.pl	15–17 Dec	1,000	33.0	28.4	19.1	8.7	7.7			0.8	2.3	4.6
	13 Dec	**Third Cabinet of Donald Tusk takes office**										
CBOS	2–8 Dec	1,000	30	25	13	9	9			3	12	5
IPSOS / More in Common Polska	1–8 Dec	1,507	31	26	15	10	7			3	5	5
Opinia24	5–6 Dec		29.2	24.7	17.3	8.0	8.0	1.7	1.2	0.3	9.6	4.5
United Surveys / WP.pl	1–3 Dec	1,000	35.2	28.8	16.0	10.0	7.7				2.3	6.4
IBRiS / Rz	1–2 Dec	1,071	31.5	27.0	17.6 (Note: Poland 2050 – 10.3, Polish People's Party – 7.3)	9.3	9.0			1.8	3.8	4.5
CBOS	20–24 Nov	821	29	24	13	8	8			5	13	5
United Surveys / WP.pl	17–19 Nov	1,000	31.3	26.7	14.4	10.4	9.1			2.2	5.9	4.6
Social Changes / wPolityce.pl	10–13 Nov	1,081	33	32	14	9	9	2		1		1
Pollster / “SE.pl”	7–8 Nov	1,014	35.34	30.77	16.68	6.90	7.01	1.36	1.75	0.19		4.57
United Surveys / WP.pl	3–5 Nov	1,000	33.2	30.4	16.1	8.5	6.0			0.3	5.5	2.8
IBRiS / Rz	3–5 Nov	1,071	32.6	29.2	15.4 (Note: Polish People's Party – 7.8, Poland 2050 – 7.6)	9.1	7.0			1.1	5.6	3.4
United Surveys / WP.pl	20–22 Oct	1,000	32.8	29.9	18.7	5.4	6.5			3.5	3.2	2.9
Parliamentary election	15 Oct	21,596,674	35.38	30.70	14.40	8.61	7.16	1.86	1.63	0.23		4.69

=== Alternative scenarios ===
Polling firm/Link	Fieldwork date	Sample size	Razem	Lewica	KO	Polska 2050	PSL	R+	PiS	Konfederacja		KKP	Others	Don't know	Lead
Polling firm/Link	Fieldwork date	Sample size	Razem	Lewica	KO	Polska 2050	PSL	R+	PiS	RN	NN	KKP	Others	Don't know	Lead
United Surveys / WP.pl	6–9 Nov 2026	1,000	5.8; 6	41.3; 212				**46.6**; 242						6.3	**5.3**; **30 seats**
OGB	27–31 Oct 2026	1,000	3.66; 0	**47.01**; 241				31.32; 161			6.24; 9	11.77; 49			**15.69**; **80 seats**
United Surveys / WP.pl	16–18 Oct 2026	1,000	4.1; 0	**39.4**; 228				5.5; 14	19.5; 103	13.9; 67		10.8; 48		6.8	**19.9**; **125 seats**
OGB / Liberté!	1–13 Oct 2026	2,000	2.77; 0	**44.33**; 231				5.13; 9	23.92; 123	12.26; 49		11.59; 48			**20.41**; **108 seats**
OGB / Liberté!	1–13 Oct 2026	2,000	8.55; 27		**39.52**; 204			4.21; 0	24.68; 132	11.74; 49		11.30; 48			**14.84**; **72 seats**
Pollster / "SE.pl"	Aug 2026	–	**55.41**					43.10					1.49		**12.31**
Pollster / "SE.pl"	Aug 2026	–	**46.65**					5.46	23.57	13.81		9.50	1.01		**23.08**
United Surveys / WP.pl	7–9 Aug 2026	1,000	4.1; 0	7.1; 29	**28.7**; 186	1.6; 0	4.6; 0	21.4 (Note: Hypothetical scenario of R+ contesting the election in coalition with PiS); 133		12.4; 69		8.8; 43	0.2	11.2	**7.3**; **53 seats**
Pollster / "SE.pl"	24–25 Jul 2026	1,013	4.99	8.10	**32.75**	2.09	3.94	24.14		13.85		8.62	1.52 (Note: Centre – 0.91)		**8.61**
United Surveys / WP.pl	24–25 Jul 2026	1,000	2.0; 0	7.2; 27	**29.4**; 175	0.6; 0	3.1; 0	21.5; 123		14.5; 76		12.0; 59		9.7	**7.5**; **52 seats**
Opinia24 / "Fakty" TVN, TVN24	Jul 2026	–	4.5	7.1	**30.9**	0.6	3.3	6.2	17.7	12.9		9.6	1.8	3.1	**13.2**
Pollster / "SE.pl"	16–17 Jul 2026	1,021	6.50	8.04	**31.64**	4.37	1.83	2.33	23.80	12.29		8.67	0.53		**7.84**
Pollster / "SE.pl"	30 Jun – 1 Jul 2026	1,042	4.45	7.79	**32.45**	1.92	3.79	2.05	24.97	12.75		8.97	0.86		**7.48**
Opinia24 / "GW"	27–30 Apr 2026	1,002	4.0; 0	**35.7**; 214		3.1; 0	3.0; 0		23.4; 146	12.2; 62		7.9; 38			**12.3**; **68 seats**
OGB	16–27 Apr 2026	1,000	3.98; 0	4.95; 0	**34.49**; 206	2.37; 0	2.88; 0	5.84; 12	24.73; 142	11.76; 55		9.00; 44			**9.76**; **64 seats**
OGB	12–19 Jan 2026	1,000	8.05; 22		**40.87**; 205				28.00; 137	12.81; 52		10.27; 44			**12.87**; **68 seats**
Opinia24 / "GW"	4–7 Dec 2025	1,001	3.5; 0	**39.3**; 217					25.1; 142	13.7; 64		8.3; 37	3.9	6.2	**14.2**; **75 seats**
OGB	15–22 Oct 2025	1,000	2.19; 0	**46.73**; 236					28.70; 142	16.54; 74		5.84; 8			**18.03**; **94 seats**

== Local sample ==
=== Kraków ===
Polling firm/Link	Fieldwork date	Sample size	Sample location	Razem	Lewica	KO	Polska 2050	PSL	R+	PiS	Konfederacja	KKP	Others	Don't know	Lead
OGB / Polsat News, Newsmax	11 Oct 2026	–	Kraków	9.1	49.5				4.1	19.1	15.0	3.2			30.4
OGB / Polsat News, Newsmax	11 Oct 2026	–	Kraków	8.6	5.9	40.2	5.0	0.9	2.7	19.0	14.5	3.2			21.2
OGB / Polsat News, Newsmax	27 Sep 2026	–	Kraków	9.7	6.2	37.7	1.8	0.9	3.1	22.5	12.8	5.3			15.2
OGB / LoveKraków.pl	23–24 Sep 2026	750	Kraków	12.46	5.42	36.39	4.22	2.59	5.40	15.35	12.78	5.39			21.04
Opinia24 / Radio Kraków	9–14 Sep 2026	543	Kraków	9.0	7.7	29.1	1.2	0.8	3.4	15.9	12.2	5.3	5.4	9.8	13.2
IBRiS	7–8 Sep 2026	1,000	Kraków	8.3	8.9	36.5	1.4	1.0	2.2	13.2	10.6	9.5		8.4	23.3

=== Other cities ===
Polling firm/Link	Fieldwork date	Sample size	Sample location	Razem	Lewica	KO	Polska 2050	PSL	R+	PiS	Konfederacja	KKP	Others	Don't know	Lead
OGB / Bartłomiej Farjaszewski	26–31 Aug 2026	1,000	Poznań	8.7	10.2	49.1	1.4	0.9	4.6	9.2	10.4	5.4			38.7

== Seat projection ==
231 seats are needed for a Sejm majority, while 276 seats are needed for a three-fifths Sejm supermajority to override presidential vetoes. A supermajority for each house is shaded in scarlet red.

Polling Firm/Link	Fieldwork Period	Sample Size	PiS	R+	KO	Polska 2050	PSL	Lewica	Razem	Konfederacja	KKP	MN	Majority	KO+Left+PSL+ PL2050+UC
Research Partner	13–16 Nov 2026	1,040	152	0	181	0	0	28	0	69	30	0	Hung	–21
Social Changes / wPolsce24, wPolityce.pl	6–10 Nov 2026	1,095	140	0	162	0	0	44	0	63	51	0	Hung	–24
United Surveys / WP.pl	6–9 Nov 2026	1,000	90	23	194	0	0	28	0	80	45	0	Hung	–8
IBRiS / Rz	6–7 Nov 2026	1,069	96	20	188	0	0	31	0	72	53	0	Hung	–11
OGB	26 Oct – 5 Nov 2026	2,000	135	0	219	0	0	0	0	64	42	0	Hung	–11
United Surveys / WP.pl	2 Nov 2026	1,000	108	16	172	0	0	30	0	73	61	0	Hung	–28
IPSOS / "19:30" TVP Info	21–22 Oct 2026	1,000	157	0	196	0	5	18	0	48	36	0	Hung	–11
United Surveys / WP.pl	16–18 Oct 2026	1,000	94	30	184	0	0	34	0	69	49	0	Hung	–13
OGB	1–13 Oct 2026	2,000	139	0	202	0	0	13	0	55	51	0	Hung	–15
United Surveys / WP.pl	2–4 Oct 2026	1,000	103	19	190	0	0	30	0	77	41	0	Hung	–10
OGB	18–22 Sep 2026	1,000	125	9	201	0	0	19	0	63	43	0	Hung	–10
United Surveys / WP.pl	18–20 Sep 2026	1,000	95	15	192	0	0	39	0	66	53	0	Hung	1
United Surveys / WP.pl	4–6 Sep 2026	1,000	113	21	189	0	0	25	0	85	27	0	Hung	–16
IBRiS / Onet	25–27 Aug 2026	1,100	120	21	165	0	0	35	0	73	46	0	Hung	–30
United Surveys / WP.pl	21–23 Aug 2026	1,000	122	25	169	0	0	29	0	77	38	0	Hung	–33
IBRIS / Rz	21–22 Aug 2026	1,067	109	25	181	0	0	27	0	75	43	0	Hung	–23
OGB	5–12 Aug 2026	1,000	126	8	185	0	0	13	0	79	49	0	Hung	–32
United Surveys / WP.pl	7–9 Aug 2026	1,000	108	29	187	0	0	31	0	56	49	0	Hung	–12
United Surveys / WP.pl	24–25 Jul 2026	1,000	88	31	174	0	0	33	0	71	63	0	Hung	–23
United Surveys / WP.pl	16–17 Jul 2026	1,000	108	26	176	0	0	36	0	61	53	0	Hung	–18
United Surveys / WP.pl	10–12 Jul 2026	1,000	125		158	0	9	34	0	83	51	0	Hung	–29
IBRiS / Rz	2–3 Jul 2026	1,071	136		168	0	0	30	0	72	54	0	Hung	–32
United Surveys / WP.pl	26–28 Jun 2026	1,000	135		165	0	0	47	0	58	55	0	Hung	–18
Research Partner	12–15 Jun 2026	1,067	155		190	0	0	38	0	54	23	0	Hung	–2
United Surveys / WP.pl	12–14 Jun 2026	1,000	140		177	0	13	27	0	60	43	0	Hung	–13
OGB	12–23 May 2026	1,000	143		214	0	0	7	0	53	43	0	Hung	–9
United Surveys / WP.pl	22–24 May 2026	1,000	137		180	0	0	35	0	72	36	0	Hung	–15
OGB	28 Apr – 11 May 2026	1,000	140		201	0	0	12	0	59	48	0	Hung	–17
United Surveys / WP.pl	8–10 May 2026	1,000	138		193	0	0	24	0	66	39	0	Hung	–13
Opinia24 / GW	27–30 Apr 2026	1,002	135		196	0	0	24	0	63	42	0	Hung	–10
OGB	16–27 Apr 2026	1,000	159		207	0	0	0	0	60	34	0	Hung	–23
United Surveys / WP.pl	24–26 Apr 2026	1,000	143		192	0	0	36	0	64	25	0	Hung	–2
United Surveys / WP.pl	17–19 Apr 2026	1,000	115	14	195	0	0	32	0	68	36	0	Hung	–4
United Surveys / WP.pl	10–12 Apr 2026	1,000	137		182	0	0	32	0	74	35	0	Hung	–16
OGB	25 Mar – 4 Apr 2026	1,000	159		209	0	0	0	0	47	45	0	Hung	–21
United Surveys / WP.pl	27–29 Mar 2026	1,000	134		186	0	13	31	0	63	33	0	Hung	–1
Research Partner	20–23 Mar 2026	1,080	167		185	0	0	22	0	50	36	0	Hung	–23
OGB	11–16 Mar 2026	1,000	151		207	0	0	7	0	57	38	0	Hung	–16
United Surveys / WP.pl	13–15 Mar 2026	1,000	140		189	0	0	23	0	74	34	0	Hung	–18
IBRiS / Onet	9 Mar 2026	1,000	144		180	0	0	21	0	78	37	0	Hung	–29
United Surveys / WP.pl	27 Feb – 1 Mar 2026	1,000	140		188	0	0	32	0	63	37	0	Hung	–10
IBRiS / Rz	27–28 Feb 2026	1,073	131		186	0	0	26	0	74	43	0	Hung	–18
United Surveys / WP.pl	20–21 Feb 2026	1,000	122		183	0	13	29	0	67	46	0	Hung	–5
United Surveys / WP.pl	13–15 Feb 2026	1,000	128		192	0	0	32	0	64	44	0	Hung	–7
OGB	9–14 Feb 2026	1,000	154		188	0	0	10	0	70	38	0	Hung	–32
United Surveys / WP.pl	30 Jan – 1 Feb 2026	1,000	142		202	0	0	25	0	57	33	1	Hung	–4
IBRiS / Rz	30–31 Jan 2026	1,067	131		183	0	15	32	0	61	38	0	Hung	–1
IBRiS / Onet	20–21 Jan 2026	1,100	168		184	0	0	23	0	65	20	0	Hung	–24
OGB	12–19 Jan 2026	1,000	149		215	0	0	0	0	55	41	0	Hung	–16
United Surveys / WP.pl	16–18 Jan 2026	1,000	153		190	0	0	19	0	72	26	0	Hung	–21
United Surveys / WP.pl	2–4 Jan 2026	1,000	149		182	0	0	33	0	53	43	0	Hung	–15
United Surveys / WP.pl	19–21 Dec 2025	1,000	147		190	0	0	28	0	61	34	0	Hung	–12
OGB	9–15 Dec 2025	1,000	178		191	0	0	0	0	43	48	0	Hung	–39
United Surveys / WP.pl	5–8 Dec 2025	1,000	150		189	0	0	25	0	63	33	0	Hung	–16
Opinia24 / "GW"	4–7 Dec 2025	1,001	149		197	0	0	0	0	68	46	0	Hung	–34
OGB	22–25 Nov 2025	1,000	152		210	0	0	0	0	62	36	0	Hung	–20
United Surveys / WP.pl	21–23 Nov 2025	1,000	150		179	0	0	30	0	80	21	0	Hung	–21
Research Partner	31 Oct – 3 Nov 2025	1,090	178		179	0	0	27	0	56	20	0	Hung	–24
OGB	23–27 Oct 2025	1,000	154		218	0	0	0	0	70	18	0	Hung	–12
United Surveys / WP.pl	24–26 Oct 2025	1,000	161		189	0	0	26	0	60	24	0	Hung	–15
OGB	15–22 Oct 2025	1,000	162		210	0	0	0	0	79	9	0	Hung	–20
OGB	8–13 Oct 2025	1,000	162		193	0	0	0	0	81	24	0	Hung	–37
United Surveys / WP.pl	10–12 Oct 2025	1,000	168		174	0	0	27	0	70	20	1	Hung	–29
IBRiS / Onet	8–9 Oct 2025	1,100	170		176	0	0	23	0	78	13	0	Hung	–31
Research Partner	26–29 Sep 2025	1,070	191		171	0	0	24	0	61	13	0	Hung	–35
United Surveys / WP.pl	26–28 Sep 2025	1,000	169		179	0	0	31	0	80	0	1	Hung	–20
United Surveys / WP.pl	13–15 Sep 2025	1,000	178		189	0	0	24	0	69	0	0	Hung	–17
OGB	2–9 Sep 2025	1,000	175		191	0	0	0	0	81	13	0	Hung	–39
United Surveys / WP.pl	28 Aug – 1 Sep 2025	1,000	193		165	0	0	29	0	73	0	0	Hung	–36
IBRiS / Onet	29–30 Aug 2025	1,100	182		167	0	0	31	0	80	0	0	Hung	–32
Research Partner	22–25 Aug 2025	1,040	212		167	0	0	24	0	57	0	0	Hung	–39
United Surveys / WP.pl	13–16 Aug 2025	1,000	169		174	0	0	18	0	99	0	0	Hung	–38
OGB	6–13 Aug 2025	1,000	179		185	0	0	8	0	80	8	0	Hung	–37
United Surveys / WP.pl	25–27 Jul 2025	1,000	170		153	0	0	25	0	96	16	0	Hung	–52
United Surveys / WP.pl	11–13 Jul 2025	1,000	186		178	0	0	28	0	68	0	0	Hung	–24
OGB	4–11 Jul 2025	1,000	153		175	0	0	20	0	84	28	0	Hung	–35
United Surveys / WP.pl	27–29 Jun 2025	1,000	177		158	0	0	26	14	84	0	1	Hung	–46
IBRiS / Onet	23–24 Jun 2025	1,100	192		154	0	0	19	0	95	6	0	Hung	–57
United Surveys / WP.pl	6–8 Jun 2025	1,000	166		185	0		17	12	79		1	Hung	–28
IBRiS / Onet	26–27 May 2025	1,070	188		170	10		6	0	86		0	Hung	–44
Opinia24 / Radio ZET	23–26 May 2025	1,021	182		179	0		15	0	84		0	Hung	–36
IBRiS / Onet	12–13 May 2025	1,072	186		170	31		22	0	51		0	Hung	–7
United Surveys / WP.pl	7 May 2025	1,000	167		192	0		32	0	69		0	Hung	–6
United Surveys / WP.pl	28–29 Apr 2025	1,000	154		174	36		23	0	72		1	Hung	3
United Surveys / WP.pl	17–19 Apr 2025	1,000	168		162	31		30	0	68		1	Hung	–7
United Surveys / WP.pl	4–6 Apr 2025	1,000	163		202	0		11	0	84		0	Hung	–17
Pollster / Republika	3–4 Apr 2025	1,003	152		162	39		24		83		0	Hung	–5
Research Partner	21–24 Mar 2025	1,060	182		177	0		26		75		0	Hung	–27
United Surveys / WP.pl	21–23 Mar 2025	1,000	167		200	0		0	0	93		0	Hung	–30
United Surveys / WP.pl	21–24 Feb 2025	1,000	151		176	28		26	0	78		1	Hung	0
Research Partner	21–24 Feb 2025	1,050	174		156	34		29		67		0	Hung	–11
United Surveys / WP.pl	8–9 Feb 2025	1,000	166		179	31		24	0	59		0	Hung	4
Research Partner	24–27 Jan 2025	1,060	180		159	37		22		62		0	Hung	–12
United Surveys / WP.pl	24–26 Jan 2025	1,000	165		175	31		30	0	58		1	Hung	6
IBRiS / Rz	10–11 Jan 2025	1,068	184		167	35		18	0	57		0	Hung	–10
Research Partner	8–11 Nov 2024	1,080	177		174	42		22		45		0	Hung	8
United Surveys / WP.pl	8–10 Nov 2024	1,000	172		186	33		23		45		1	Hung	12
United Surveys / WP.pl	25–27 Oct 2024	1,000	155		184	43		33		44		1	Hung	30
Opinia24 / "GW"	7–9 Oct 2024	1,000	188		185	23		10		54		0	Hung	-12
Research Partner	13–16 Sep 2024	1,040	179		164	36		33		48		0	Hung	3
United Surveys / WP.pl	30 Aug – 1 Sep 2024	1,000	174		188	38		28		31		1	Hung	24
United Surveys / WP.pl	26–28 Jul 2024	1,000	153		183	46		40		38		0	Hung	39
IBRiS / Onet	24–25 Jul 2024	1,100	165		169	45		28		53		0	Hung	12
Research Partner	19–22 Jul 2024	1,040	174		168	34		28		56		0	Hung	0
IBRiS / Onet	18–19 Jun 2024	1,100	186		183	33		20		38		0	Hung	6
IBRiS	3 Jun 2024	1,067	179		174	48		25		34		0	Hung	17
Opinia24	13–14 May 2024	1,000	168		163	60		18		51		0	Hung	11
Research Partner	10–13 May 2024	1,051	180		156	51		33		39		1	Hung	10
United Surveys / WP.pl	19-21 Apr 2024	1,000	173		176	53		32		25		0	Hung	31
OGB	3–5 Apr 2024	1,000	189		175	53		0		42		1	Hung	–2
IBRiS / Onet	4 Apr 2024	1,068	165		175	52		38		30		0	Hung	35
Research Partner	8–11 Mar 2024	1,088	180		170	42		35		33		0	Hung	17
IPSOS / OKO.press, TOK FM	22–26 Feb 2024	1,000	176		157	63		12		52		0	Hung	2
Pollster / TVP	15–16 Feb 2024	1,034	169		156	80		26		29		0	Hung	32
IBSP / Stan Polityki	12–15 Feb 2024	1,000	178		173	69		0		39		1	Hung	12
Research Partner	9–12 Feb 2024	1,081	176		159	66		40		19		1	Hung	35
IBRiS / Rz	12–13 Jan 2024	1,000	177		155	78		34		16		0	Hung	37
IBRiS / Onet	5–8 Jan 2024	1,000	194		166	67		29		4		0	Hung	32
Parliamentary election	15 Oct 2023	21,596,674	194		157	65		26		18		0	Hung	18

== Senate seats projection ==
51 seats are needed for a Senate majority, while 374 seats are needed for a two-thirds National Assembly (Senate + Sejm) supermajority to impeach the president. A supermajority in each house is shaded in scarlet red.

Polling Firm/Link	Fieldwork Period	Sample Size	Senate Pact					PiS	Konfederacja	Majority
Polling Firm/Link	Fieldwork Period	Sample Size	KO	PSL	Polska 2050	Lewica	SP Ind	PiS	Konfederacja	Majority
Research Partner	19–22 Jul 2024	1,040	70					30	0	20
Research Partner	9–12 Feb 2024	1,081	74					26	0	24
Parliamentary election	15 Oct 2023	21,402,998 (Note: Turnout: 74.31%)	66					34	0	16

== Government approval ratings ==
=== President Karol Nawrocki ===
Graphical summary of approval polls

Date(s) conducted	Polling firm/Link	Sample size	Approve	Disapprove	Neither	Don't know/Neutral	Net approval
2–5 Nov 2026	OGB	1,000	46.0	38.3	15.7		7.7
1–11 Oct 2026	CBOS	1,028	51	39		10	12
1–7 Oct 2026	OGB	1,000	47.4	35.2	17.4		12.2
14–27 Sep 2026	CBOS	956	51	40		8	11
21–22 Sep 2026	Pollster / "SE.pl"	1,029	44	39	15	3	5
18–22 Sep 2026	OGB	1,000	45.5	37.2	17.3		8.3
20–30 Aug 2026	CBOS	935	51	40		9	11
21–23 Aug 2026	United Surveys / WP.pl (Note: Question wording: "How do you rate Karol Nawrocki's presidency so far?")	1,000	49.2	38.1		12.7	11.1
5–12 Aug 2026	OGB	1,000	52.5	35.1	12.4		17.4
4–5 Aug 2026	SW Research / Zero.pl (Note: Question wording: "Do you believe Karol Nawrocki is a good president?")	803	46.5	38.2		15.3	8.3
4–5 Aug 2026	SW Research / Zero.pl (Note: Question wording: "How do you rate one year of Karol Nawrocki's presidency?")	803	44.7	39.8		15.5	4.9
24–25 Jul 2026	United Surveys / WP.pl	1,000	56.0	40.5		3.5	15.5
16–17 Jul 2026	Pollster / "SE.pl" (Note: Question wording: "How do you rate one year of Karol Nawrocki as president?")	1,021	47	43		10	4
2–12 Jul 2026	CBOS	938	56	37		7	19
8 Jul 2026	SW Research / Onet	809	40.2	38.2		21.6	2.0
24–27 Jun 2026	IBRiS / Polsat News	1,000	51.7	38.9		9.3	12.8
11–21 Jun 2026	CBOS	991	51	39		10	12
29 May – 2 Jun 2026	IBRiS / Polsat News	1,000	48.1	47.9		4.0	0.2
28–29 May 2026	United Surveys / WP.pl	1,000	48.2	50.1		1.7	–1.9
7–17 May 2026	CBOS	1,041	46	42		12	4
28 Apr – 11 May 2026	OGB	1,000	44.3	39.8	15.9		4.5
16–27 Apr 2026	OGB	1,000	48.3	36.6	15.2		11.7
9–19 Apr 2026	CBOS	944	45	44		11	1
14–15 Apr 2026	SW Research / Zero.pl	812	35.8	42.6	16.7	4.9	–6.8
10–12 Apr 2026	United Surveys / WP.pl	1,000	47.0	49.5		3.5	–2.5
27–28 Mar 2026	IBRiS / PAP	1,067	50	46		4	4
17–18 Mar 2026	SW Research / Wprost	811	39.1	38.6	18.1	4.1	0.5
11–16 Mar 2026	OGB	1,000	47.4	38.9	13.7		8.5
13–15 Mar 2026	United Surveys / WP.pl	1,000	47.1	49.8		3.1	–2.7
5–15 Mar 2026	CBOS	1,012	50	38		12	12
5–16 Feb 2026	CBOS	967	50	39		11	11
9–14 Feb 2026	OGB	1,000	48.82	36.36	14.82		12.46
10–11 Feb 2026	SW Research / Zero.pl	823	44.4	41.6		14.0	2.8
30 Jan – 1 Feb 2026	United Surveys / WP.pl (Note: Question wording: "How do you rate Karol Nawrocki after half a year as president of Poland?")	1,000	51.1	46.1		2.8	5.0
28 Jan 2026	SW Research / Onet (Note: Question wording: "Does Karol Nawrocki fulfill your expectations as president of Poland?")	800	41.8	41.4		16.8	0.4
8–20 Jan 2026	CBOS	938	50	39		12	11
12–19 Jan 2026	OGB	1,000	50.6	37.4	12.1		13.2
31 Dec 2025–1 Jan 2026	Pollster / "SE.pl" (Note: Question wording: "How do you rate half a year of Karol Nawrocki as president?")	1,002	55	45			10
9–15 Dec 2025	OGB	1,000	51.8	34.2	14.0		17.6
5–9 Dec 2025	Ipsos / Radio ZET (Note: Question wording: "How do you rate Karol Nawrocki as a politician?")	1,000	38	38	21	3	Tie
27 Nov – 8 Dec 2025	CBOS	948	51	34		15	17
25–28 Nov 2025	OGB	1,000	49.7	34.8	15.5		14.9
25–26 Nov 2025	UCE Research / Onet	1,021	46.8	30.1		23.1	16.7
15–17 Nov 2025	Pollster / "SE.pl"	1,003	49	39		12	10
6–17 Nov 2025	CBOS	992	50	33		17	17
14–16 Nov 2025	United Surveys / WP.pl	1,000	57.5	35.4		7.1	22.1
13–14 Nov 2025	Ariadna / WP.pl	1,050	50	34		16	16
7–8 Nov 2025	IBRiS / Rz	1,067	55.8	30.8		13.4	25.0
22–24 Oct 2025	Opinia24 / Polityka	1,001	53	26		21	27
8–13 Oct 2025	OGB	1,000	46.3	30.8	22.9		15.5
2–13 Oct 2025	CBOS	901	51	26		23	25
11–22 Sep 2025	CBOS	969	54	26		20	28
19–20 Sep 2025	IBRiS / Onet	1,100	51.6	38.0		10.4	13.6
13–15 Sep 2025	United Surveys / WP.pl	1,000	57.5	32.9		9.6	24.6
2–9 Sep 2025	OGB	1,000	47.5	33.2	19.3		14.3
2–3 Sep 2025	SW Research / Onet	830	42.9	32.2		24.9	10.7
28 Aug – 1 Sep 2025	United Surveys / WP.pl	1,000	45.2	44.8		10.0	0.4
21 Aug – 1 Sep 2025	CBOS	917	44	30		26	14
6–13 Aug 2025	OGB	1,000	41.7	32.7	25.6		9.0

=== Prime Minister Donald Tusk ===
Graphical summary of approval polls

Date(s) conducted	Polling firm/Link	Sample size	Approve	Disapprove	Neither	Don't know/Neutral	Net approval
1–11 Oct 2026	CBOS	1,028	33	54		13	–21
6–7 Oct 2026	SW Research / Wprost	820	38.4	46.1		15.5	–7.7
14–27 Sep 2026	CBOS	956	33	55		11	–22
21–22 Sep 2026	Pollster / "SE.pl"	1,029	33	53	13	1	–20
4–6 Sep 2026	United Surveys / WP.pl	1,000	37.4	54.3		8.3	–16.9
20–30 Aug 2026	CBOS	935	36	51		13	–15
2–12 Jul 2026	CBOS	938	31	58		11	–27
11–21 Jun 2026	CBOS	991	35	54		11	–19
7–17 May 2026	CBOS	1,041	35	52		12	–17
9–19 Apr 2026	CBOS	944	37	49		14	–12
27–28 Mar 2026	IBRiS / PAP	1,067	37	57		6	–20
5–15 Mar 2026	CBOS	1,012	37	53		10	–16
9 Mar 2026	IBRiS / Onet	1,000	38.2	60.3		1.5	–22.1
5–16 Feb 2026	CBOS	967	35	54		12	–19
8–20 Jan 2026	CBOS	938	36	53		11	–17
5–9 Dec 2025	Ipsos / Radio ZET (Note: Question wording: "How do you rate ... as a politician?")	1,000	27	51	19		–24
27 Nov – 8 Dec 2025	CBOS	948	36	54		10	–18
25–26 Nov 2025	UCE Research / Onet	1,021	33.1	42.6		24.6	–9.5
6–17 Nov 2025	CBOS	992	36	52		12	–16
2–13 Oct 2025	CBOS	901	33	57		10	–24
11–22 Sep 2025	CBOS	969	32	55		12	–23
19–20 Sep 2025	IBRiS / Onet	1,100	39.7	53.3		7.1	–13.6
13–15 Sep 2025	United Surveys / WP.pl	1,000	48.4	47.6		4.0	0.8
21 Aug – 1 Sep 2025	CBOS	917	32	58		10	–26
3–13 Jul 2025	CBOS	970	31	58		10	–27
5–15 Jun 2025	CBOS	971	32	58		10	–26
6–7 Jun 2025	IBRiS / Rz	1,069	35.1	57.8		7.0	–22.7
5–14 May 2025	CBOS	1,080	35	53		12	–18
5–8 May 2025	AtlasIntel	5,071	36.4	55.7		7.9	–19.3
3–13 Apr 2025	CBOS	1,030	37	51		12	–14
6–16 Mar 2025	CBOS	1,047	38	50		12	–12
6–16 Feb 2025	CBOS	965	37	51		12	–14
9–19 Jan 2025	CBOS	972	35	52		13	–17
20–22 Dec 2024	United Surveys / WP.pl	1,000	47.1	48.7		4.2	–1.6
28 Nov–8 Dec 2024	CBOS	915	36	54		10	–18
8–21 Nov 2024	CBOS	981	37	51		12	–14
3–13 Oct 2024	CBOS	1,025	36	50		14	–14
12–22 Sep 2024	CBOS	941	38	50		12	–12
14–25 Aug 2024	CBOS	939	35	53		13	–18
4–14 Jul 2024	CBOS	1,076	37	53		10	–16
10–20 Jun 2024	CBOS	1,055	40	47		13	–7
18–19 Jun 2024	IBRiS / Rz	1,100	41.6	40.9	11.3		0.7
20 May–2 Jun 2024	CBOS	1,015	40	48		12	–8
8–18 Apr 2024	CBOS	1,079	41	48		11	–7
7–17 Mar 2024	CBOS	1,089	40	49		11	–11
8–18 Feb 2024	CBOS	994	43	47		10	–4
11–21 Jan 2024	CBOS	1,015	41	49		10	–8

=== Third Tusk government ===
Graphical summary of approval polls

Date(s) conducted	Polling firm/Link	Sample size	Approve	Disapprove	Neither	Don't know	Net approval	Notes
2–5 Nov 2026	OGB	1,000	28.95	50.47	20.58		–21.52	Tusk's government
1–11 Oct 2026	CBOS	1,028	31	43	22	4	–12	Tusk's government
1–7 Oct 2026	OGB	1,000	26.7	53.6	19.7		–26.9	Tusk's government
2–3 Oct 2026	IBRiS / Radio ZET	1,072	42.1	49.3		8.6	–7.2	Does Tusk's government serve Poland well?
14–27 Sep 2026	CBOS	956	33	45	20	3	–22	Tusk's government
Sep 2026	Pollster / "SE.pl"	–	19	53	16	2	–34	Tusk's government since its inauguration
18–22 Sep 2026	OGB	1,000	27.8	49.2	23.0		–21.4	Tusk's government
20–30 Aug 2026	CBOS	935	32	40	24	4	–8	Tusk's government
5–12 Aug 2026	OGB	1,000	26.91	53.16	19.93		–26.25	Tusk's government
28–29 Jul 2026	SW Research / Zero.pl	806	33.6	49.9		17.0	–16.3	Tusk's government
24–25 Jul 2026	United Surveys / WP.pl	1,000	35.9	58.0		6.1	–19.6	Tusk's government
2–12 Jul 2026	CBOS	938	29	48	21	2	–19	Tusk's government
8 Jul 2026	SW Research / Onet	809	27.4	51.0		21.6	–23.6	Tusk's government
11–21 Jun 2026	CBOS	991	32	42	23	3	–10	Tusk's government
28–29 May 2026	Pollster / "SE.pl"	1,057	33	54		13	–21	Tusk's government
7–17 May 2026	CBOS	1,041	33	42	21	4	–9	Tusk's government
28 Apr – 11 May 2026	OGB	1,000	30.1	45.8	24.1		–15.7	Tusk's government
16–27 Apr 2026	OGB	1,000	29.4	51.1	19.5		–21.7	Tusk's government
9–19 Apr 2026	CBOS	944	35	39	22	4	–4	Tusk's government
8–13 Apr 2026	IBRiS / Polsat News	1,000	41.1	52.6		6.4	–11.5	Tusk's government
11–16 Mar 2026	OGB	1,000	31.14	49.03	19.83		–17.89	Tusk's government
5–15 Mar 2026	CBOS	1,012	33	42	21	4	–9	Tusk's government
5–16 Feb 2026	CBOS	967	34	41	22	3	–7	Tusk's government
9–14 Feb 2026	OGB	1,000	30.0	47.2	22.8		–17.2	Tusk's government
8–20 Jan 2026	CBOS	938	33	42	22	3	–9	Tusk's government
12–19 Jan 2026	OGB	1,000	32.4	49.0	18.5		–16.6	Tusk's government
Dec 2025	Social Changes / wPolsce24	1,000	33	57		10	–24	The government
9–15 Dec 2025	OGB	1,000	30.37	53.09	16.54		–22.72	Tusk's government
7–11 Dec 2025	IBRiS / Polsat News	1,000	40.9	51.8		7.4	–8.5	Tusk's government
5–8 Dec 2025	United Surveys / WP.pl	1,000	42.0	50.5		7.5	–8.5	PM and his cabinet
27 Nov – 8 Dec 2025	CBOS	948	33	42	23	2	–9	Tusk's government
25–28 Nov 2025	OGB	1,000	34.2	49.0	16.8		–14.8	Tusk's government
25–26 Nov 2025	SW Research / Wprost	844	27.9	39.2	25.1	7.8	–11.3	Tusk's government
6–17 Nov 2025	CBOS	992	34	41	22	3	–7	Tusk's government
10–13 Oct 2025	United Surveys / WP.pl	1,000	35.5	52.8		11.7	–17.3	Tusk's government
8–13 Oct 2025	OGB	1,000	24.5	51.8	23.7		–27.3	Tusk's government
2–13 Oct 2025	CBOS	901	31	45	20	3	–14	Tusk's government
11–22 Sep 2025	CBOS	969	29	46	20	4	–17	Tusk's government
2–9 Sep 2025	OGB	1,000	28.2	50.6	21.2		–22.4	Tusk's government
21 Aug–1 Sep 2025	CBOS	917	30	46	22	2	–16	Tusk's government
6–13 Aug 2025	OGB	1,000	23.5	55.6	20.9		–32.1	Tusk's government
3–13 Jul 2025	CBOS	970	32	48	17	3	–16	Tusk's government
4–11 Jul 2025	OGB	1,000	27.0	50.4	22.6		–23.4	Tusk's government
5–15 Jun 2025	CBOS	971	32	47	19	2	–15	Tusk's government
22–24 May 2025	OGB	800	33.18	46.76	20.06		–13.58	Tusk's government
5–14 May 2025	CBOS	1,080	32	44	20	4	–12	Tusk's government
5–8 May 2025	AtlasIntel	5,071	35.9	55.2		8.8	–19.3	
3–13 Apr 2025	CBOS	1,030	34	40	22	4	–6	Tusk's government
6–16 Mar 2025	CBOS	1,047	36	38	23	3	–2	Tusk's government
17–21 Feb 2025	Opinia24 / RMF FM	972	31	57		12	–26	Tusk's government
6–16 Feb 2025	CBOS	965	36	39	21	3	–3	Tusk's government
9–19 Jan 2025	CBOS	972	31	43	23	3	–12	Tusk's government
6–8 Dec 2024	United Surveys / DGP, RMF	1,000	39.6	51.4		8.9	–11.8	Tusk's government
6–8 Dec 2024	United Surveys / WP.pl	1,000	39.3	51.8		8.9	–12.5	Tusk's government after a year
28 Nov–8 Dec 2024	CBOS	915	32	40	24	4	–8	Tusk's government
8–21 Nov 2024	CBOS	981	34	40	24	2	–6	Tusk's government
Oct 2024	United Surveys / DGP, RMF	–	38.1	32.5	27.6	1.8	5.6	Tusk's government
3–13 Oct 2024	CBOS	1,025	34	39	24	3	–5	Tusk's government
11–12 Oct 2024	IBRiS / Onet	1,071	42.8	53.4		3.8	–10.6	The government
12–22 Sep 2024	CBOS	941	35	38	23	4	–3	Tusk's government
10–20 Sep 2024	IPSOS / More in Common Polska	1,504	27	39	34		–12	Government of KO, TD and The Left
14–25 Aug 2024	CBOS	939	32	40	25	3	–8	Tusk's government
4–14 Jul 2024	CBOS	1,076	33	40	24	3	–7	Tusk's government
10–20 Jun 2024	CBOS	1,055	36	36	26	3	Tie	Tusk's government
7–9 Jun 2024	United Surveys / DGP, RMF	1,000	34.5	32.5	32.2	0.9	2.0	Tusk's government
20 May–2 Jun 2024	CBOS	1,015	37	37	24	2	Tie	Tusk's government
10–12 May 2024	United Surveys / WP.pl	1,000	50.1	46.2		3.7	3.9	Tusk's government
8–18 Apr 2024	CBOS	1,079	35	37	25	3	–2	Tusk's government
19–20 Mar 2024	SW Research / Wprost	800	37.2	34.4	28.3		2.8	First 100 days of Tusk's government
7–17 Mar 2024	CBOS	1,089	37	38	22	3	–1	Tusk's government
8–18 Feb 2024	CBOS	994	41	34	22	3	7	Tusk's government
11–21 Jan 2024	CBOS	1,015	39	39	19	3	Tie	Tusk's government
12–14 Jan 2024	United Surveys / WP.pl	1,000	54.5	40.3		5.2	14.2	Tusk's government
12–13 Jan 2024	IBRiS / Rz	1,067	56.3	36.9		6.8	19.4	Tusk's government

=== School grade scale rankings ===
In Poland, school grades range from 1 (worst) to 6 (best).

Date(s) conducted	Polling firm/Link	Sample size	Subject	1	2	3	4	5	6	Don't know/Neutral	Mean
4–5 Aug 2026	SW Research / Rz	800	President Karol Nawrocki	21.1	11.5	9.0	18.2	19.6	14.8	5.9	3.51
19–20 May 2026	SW Research / Rz	800	Minister Władysław Kosiniak-Kamysz	14.5	15.1	17.4	23.8	11.5	4.0	13.7	3.17
10–11 Feb 2026	SW Research / Rz	800	Marshal Włodzimierz Czarzasty	15.8	11.3	14.7	18.2	11.8	7.8	20.3	3.28
5–9 Dec 2025	Ipsos / Radio ZET	1,000	Third Tusk Government	24	17	22	19	7	3	9	2.75
11–12 Oct 2025	Pollster / "SE.pl"	1,002	PM Donald Tusk	33	15	16	17	11	5	3	2.72
2–3 Sep 2025	SW Research / Rz	800	President Karol Nawrocki	21.9	13.3	9.3	16.4	15.5	13.1	10.5	3.33
10–11 Jun 2025	SW Research / Rz	800	Marshal Szymon Hołownia	18.4	25.3	19.7	21.2	7.0	1.0	7.4	2.74
20–21 Feb 2024	SW Research / Rz	800	Third Tusk Government	19.6	12.2	14.6	23.8	15.3	4.3	10.3	3.18

== Leadership polling ==
=== Law and Justice prime ministerial candidate preference ===
Polling firm/Link	Fieldwork date	Sample size	Sample	Mariusz Błaszczak	Tobiasz Bocheński	Zbigniew Bogucki	Przemysław Czarnek	Andrzej Duda	Patryk Jaki	Jarosław Kaczyński	Mateusz Morawiecki	Kacper Płażyński	Paweł Szefernaker	Beata Szydło	Others	None of the above	Don't know
SW Research / Zero.pl	Aug 2026	801	All voters		3.8	6.9	7.4		6.1	5.4					6.8 (Note: Dominik Tarczyński)	32.5	31.1
	24 Jul 2026	Mateusz Morawiecki and his faction split from Law and Justice to form Development Plus															
United Surveys / WP.pl	16–17 July 2026	1,000	All voters				18.0				40.7						41.3
United Surveys / WP.pl	16–17 July 2026	1,000	Opp. (Note: Opposition parties: PiS, Razem, KWiN, KKP) voters				36				37						27
SW Research / Onet (Note: Question wording: "Who would be a better Prime Minister if Law and Justice returns to power after the 2027 elections?")	3 Jun 2026	810	All voters				9.3				21.5				5.7 (Note: "Both would be good Prime Ministers")	49.4 (Note: "Neither would be a good Prime Minister")	14.0
SW Research / Onet	23 Apr 2026	830	All voters				11.9				23.6					42.2 (Note: "I do not see a difference between the two")	22.3
	7 Mar 2026	Przemysław Czarnek is selected as the Law and Justice candidate for Prime Minister															
SW Research / Wprost	3–4 Mar 2026	833	All voters		5.2		8.2				12.0				28.0 (Note: Others — 22.6, Anna Krupka — 5.4)		37.8
Pollster / "SE.pl"			PiS voters		11	11	19			11	41				7 (Note: Others — 4, Tomasz Szatkowski — 3)		
United Surveys / WP.pl	20–21 Feb 2026	1,000	All voters	1.8	1.4	4.5	5.6	9	13		31	2		0.4	19.1		12.3
United Surveys / WP.pl	20–21 Feb 2026		PiS voters	1	3	11	10	11	25		26	3		1	8		1
SW Research / Rz	20–21 Jan 2026	800	All voters		5.0	6.9			14.0			4.1	5.4			41.3	23.3
SW Research / Onet	14 Jan 2026	820	All voters		7.5	9.1	7.9		14.9						60.6		
United Surveys / WP.pl	24–26 Oct 2025	1,000	All voters	1.8			16.0	8.8			22.7			3.3	20.2 (Note: Others — 19.1, Joachim Brudziński — 0.9, Elżbieta Witek — 0.2)		27.2

=== Right-wing prime ministerial candidate preference ===
Polling firm/Link	Fieldwork date	Sample size	Sample	Tobiasz Bocheński	Przemysław Czarnek	Jarosław Kaczyński	Mateusz Morawiecki	Krzysztof Bosak	Sławomir Mentzen	Grzegorz Braun	Others	None of the above	Don't know
SW Research / Onet	18–19 Aug 2026	809	All voters		6.0	4.2	8.4	11.0	8.5		29.6		32.3
	24 Jul 2026	Mateusz Morawiecki and his faction split from Law and Justice to form Development Plus											
IBRiS	21–22 Jul 2026	1,067	All voters		9.4	1.0	26.1	16.3	5.8	7.7			33.8
IBRiS	21–22 Jul 2026	1,067	Opp. voters		13.9	1.5	26.6	24.1	9.6	15.4			8.9
IBRiS	21–22 Jul 2026	1,067	Gov. (Note: Government parties: KO, PL2050, PSL, UC, NL) voters		0.0	0.1	25.5	11.6	2.7	0.0			60.0
IBRiS / Onet	8–9 Oct 2025	1,100	All voters	4.3	3.7	1.5	27.5	14.3	11.6		4.5 (Note: Others — 2.5, Mariusz Błaszczak — 1.0, Przemysław Wipler — 1.0)		32.6
