= Ryszard Majer =

Polish politician (born 1971)

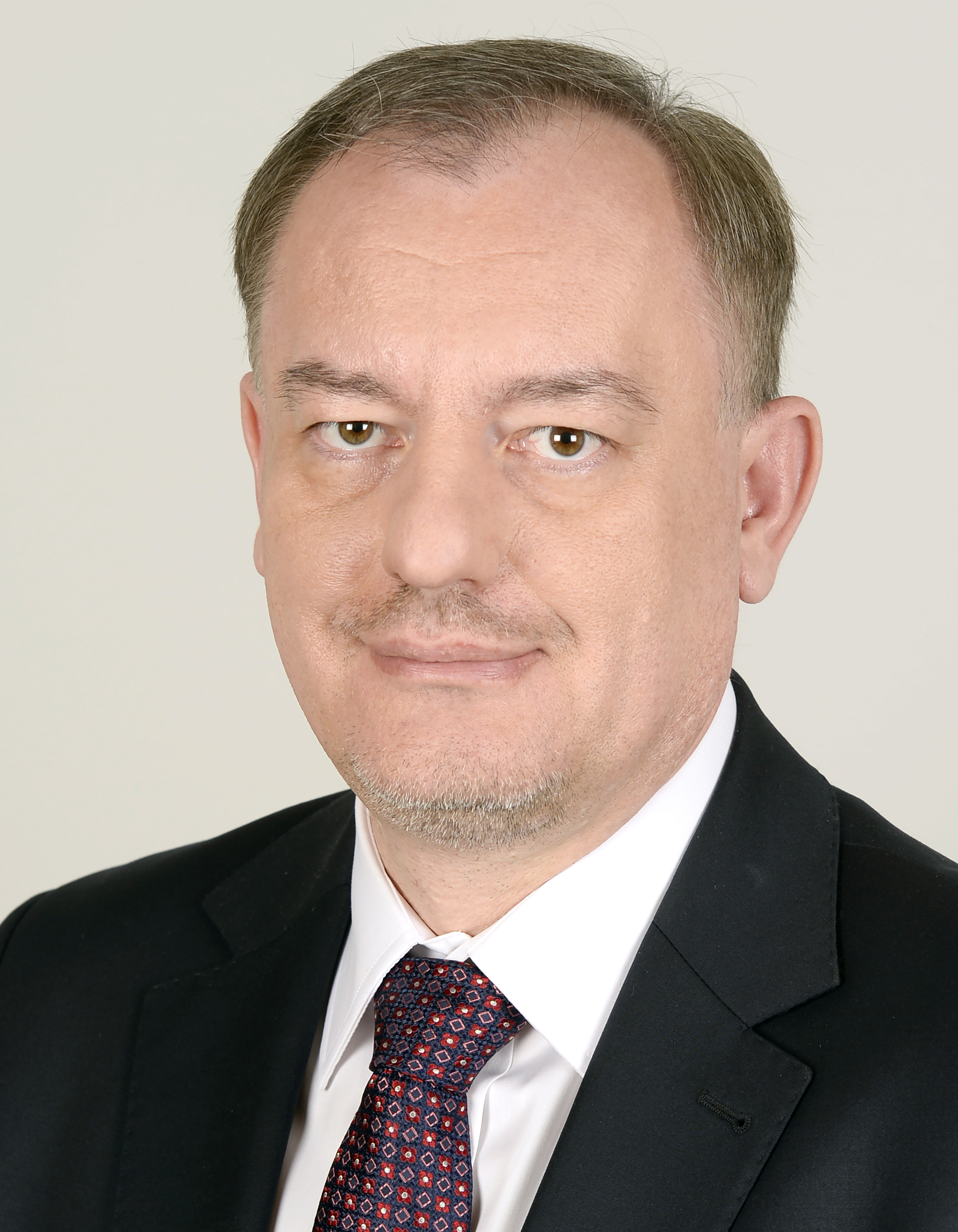

Member of Senate
- Incumbent
- Assumed office 2015

Personal details
- Born: 4 August 1971 (age 55) Częstochowa
- Party: Development Plus (since 2026)
- Other political affiliations: Law and Justice (until 2026)
- Occupation: Official, Politician, Academic teacher

Ryszard Bogdan Majer (born 4 August 1971 in Częstochowa) – is a Polish politician, academic teacher, local official.

== Biography ==
He graduated from the Jan Długosz University in Częstochowa.

He is a member of Law and Justice and Solidarity. From 2006 to 2009 he was a councilor and vice-chairman of the Silesian Regional Assembly. He was a vice-president of Częstochowa (2009-2010). In 2010 he became a councilor of Częstochowa City Council. In 2014 he was again elected as a councilor of the Silesian Regional Assembly.

In the parliamentary election in 2015 he was elected from 68th district with the support of Law and Justice to the Senate. He won the parliamentary mandate in 68th district again in parliamentary election in 2019, winning about 48 percent of the votes.
