= Robert Gontarz =

Polish politician (born 1993)

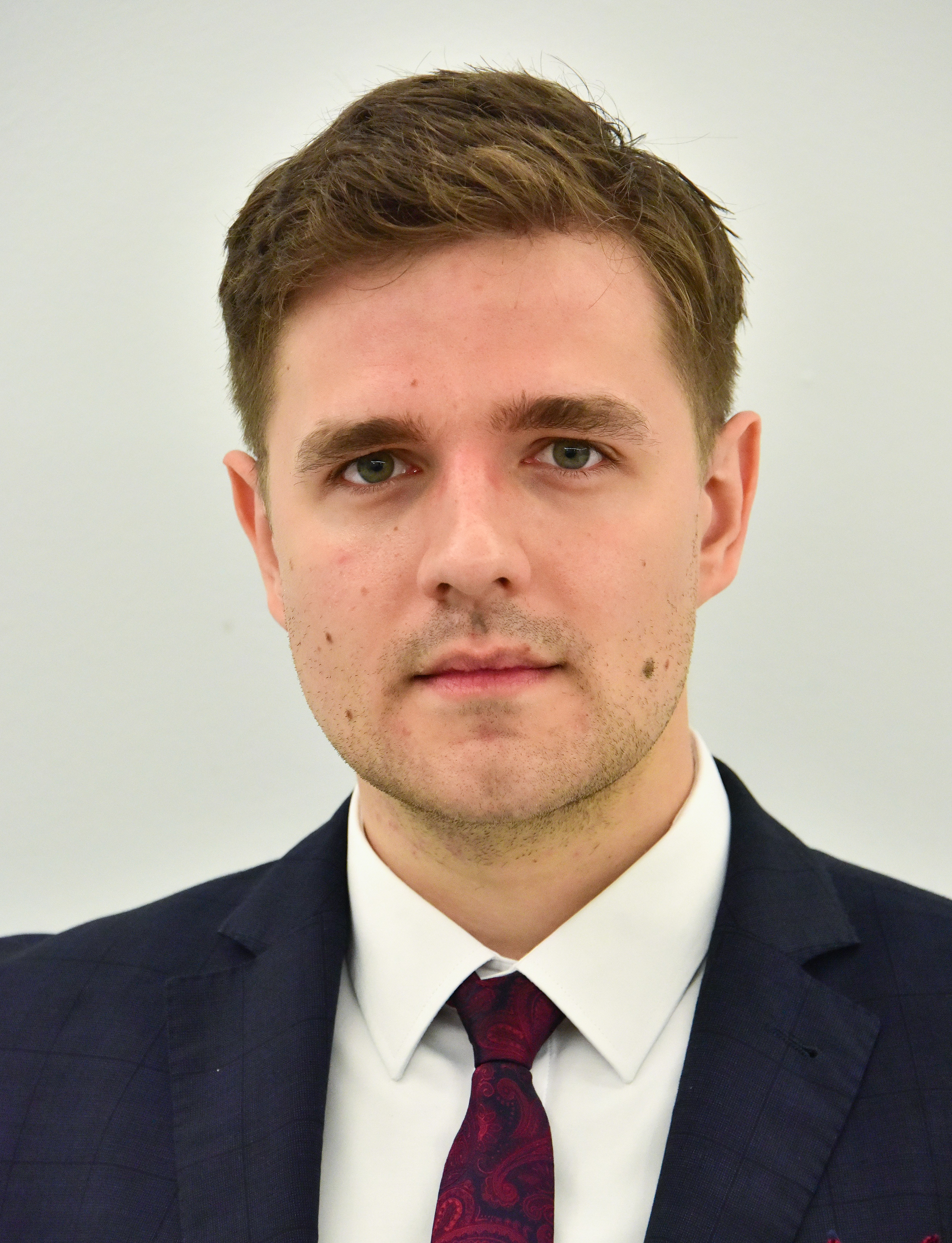
- Gontarz in 2019

Member of the Sejm
- Incumbent
- Assumed office 13 November 2019
- Constituency: Elbląg

Personal details
- Born: 2 July 1993 (age 33)
- Party: Development Plus

Robert Gontarz (born 2 July 1993) is a Polish politician serving as a member of the Sejm. He was first elected in the 2019 parliamentary election, and was re-elected in 2023. From 2018 to 2019, he was a member of the Warmian–Masurian Voivodeship Sejmik.

Previously a member of Law and Justice, in 2026 he joined the Rozwój Plus party.
