= Łukasz Schreiber =

Polish politician and chess player (born 1987)

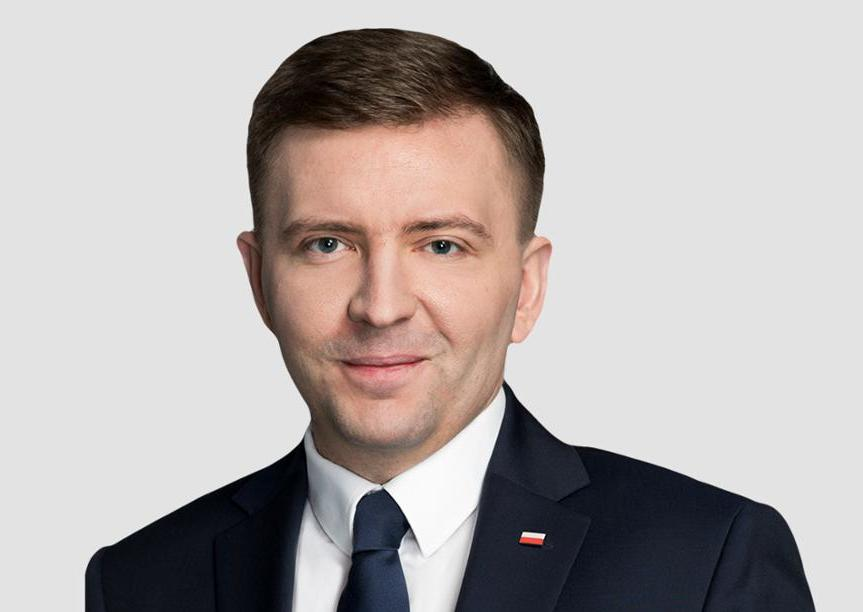

Minister without portfolio
- In office 15 November 2019 – 2023

Member of the Polish Sejm from Bydgoszcz
- Incumbent
- Assumed office 12 November 2015

Personal details
- Born: Łukasz Paweł Schreiber; 26 May 1987 (age 39) Bydgoszcz, Polish People's Republic
- Party: Development Plus
- Education: Kazimierz Wielki University in Bydgoszcz
- Occupation: politician
- Chess career
- Country: Poland
- Peak rating: 2065 (October 2006)

Łukasz Paweł Schreiber (born 26 May 1987 in Bydgoszcz) is a Polish politician and former chess champion affiliated with the conservative Law and Justice (PiS) party. The son of Grzegorz Schreiber, he has been a member of the Sejm from Bydgoszcz since 2015. Schreiber has served as a minister without portfolio in the second Morawiecki government since 2019.

== Curriculum vitae ==
In 1997, he won the title of Polish junior champion in the category of up to 10 years in chess, he was also a representative of Poland at the world and European junior championships in the same age category. A graduate of the Secondary School of the Salesian Society in Bydgoszcz. In 2009, he graduated from the Faculty of Law and Administration at the Nicolaus Copernicus University in Toruń, and in 2013 he obtained the professional title of master's degree in administration at the Kazimierz Wielki University in Bydgoszcz.

From 2004 he was active in the Young Conservatives association, he became the secretary general and chairman of the national council of this organization. He also joined the Law and Justice party, taking the position of chairman of the party's municipal structures in 2012. He was an assistant to Kosma Złotowski. He also started running his own business. He became a co-owner of an antiquities shop.

In 2014, he obtained the mandate of a city councilor in Bydgoszcz. In the parliamentary elections in 2015, he ran for the Sejm in the Bydgoszcz district on behalf of PiS. He was elected lawmaker in the 8th term of office, receiving 7291 votes. In November 2018, he was appointed the secretary of state in the Chancellery of the Prime Minister.

In the 2019 elections, he successfully ran for parliamentary re-election, receiving 30,053 votes. On 15 November 2019 he was appointed a minister-member of the Council of Ministers in the second government of Mateusz Morawiecki. On 21 November 2019 he was appointed chairman of the Standing Committee of the Council of Ministers, he also took over the duties of the secretary of the Council of Ministers.

== Private life ==
He is the son of Grzegorz Schreiber, a Law and Justice politician. He married Marianna, they have a daughter, Patrycja. His younger brother Kamil (also a chess player) became the director of the Bank Pocztowy branch in Bydgoszcz.
