= Zbigniew Chmielowiec =

Polish politician (born 1954)

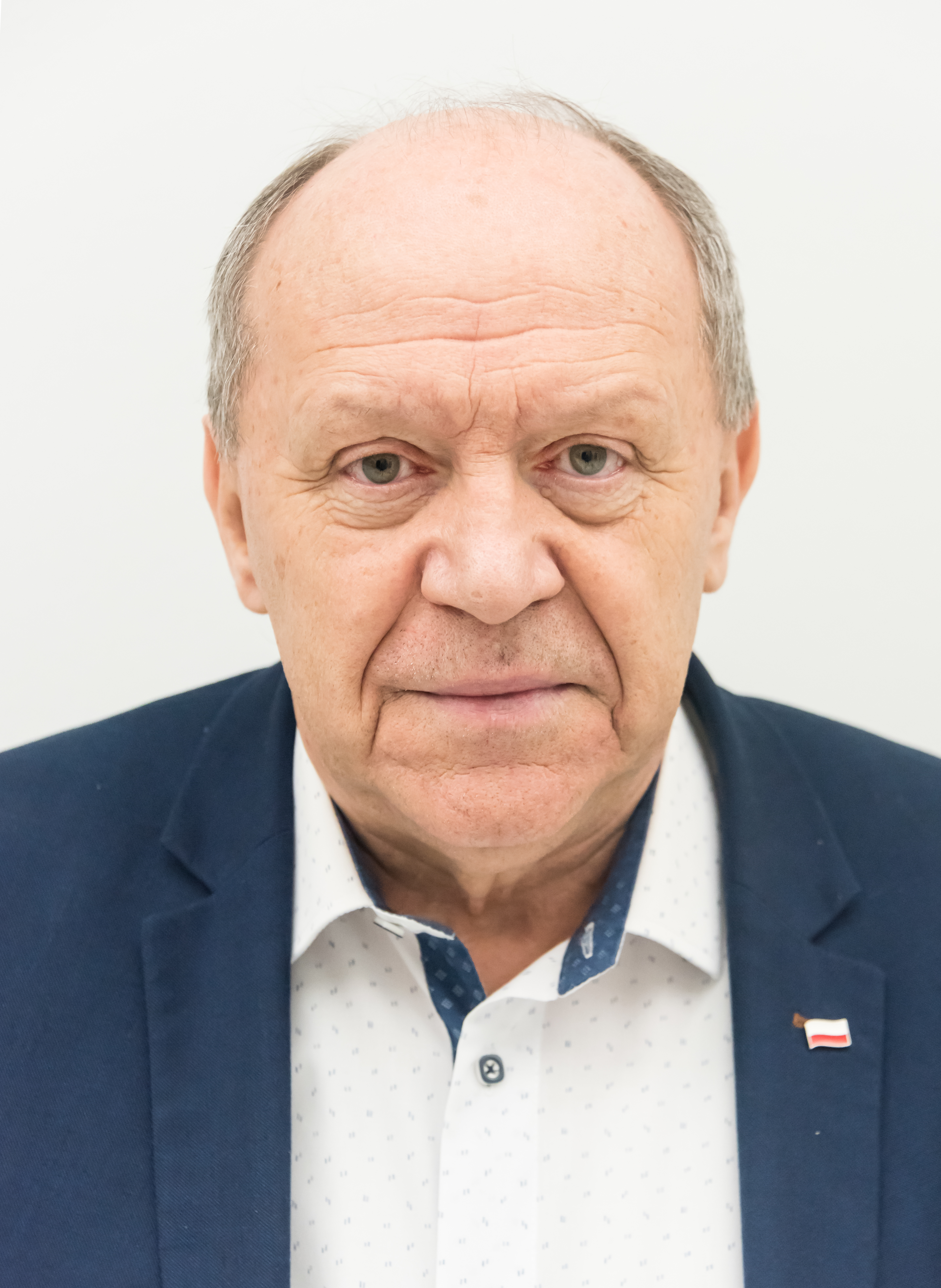
- Chmielowiec in 2023

Member of Sejm
- Incumbent
- Assumed office 25 September 2005

Personal details
- Born: 22 September 1954 (age 72)
- Party: Law and Justice

Zbigniew Michał Chmielowiec (born 22 September 1954 in Kolbuszowa) is a Polish politician. He was elected to the Polish lower house (Sejm) on 25 September 2005, getting 17243 votes in 23 Rzeszów district as a candidate from the Law and Justice list.

== See also ==
- Members of Polish Sejm 2005-2007
