= Grzegorz Macko =

Polish politician (born 1992), Member of the Polish parliament

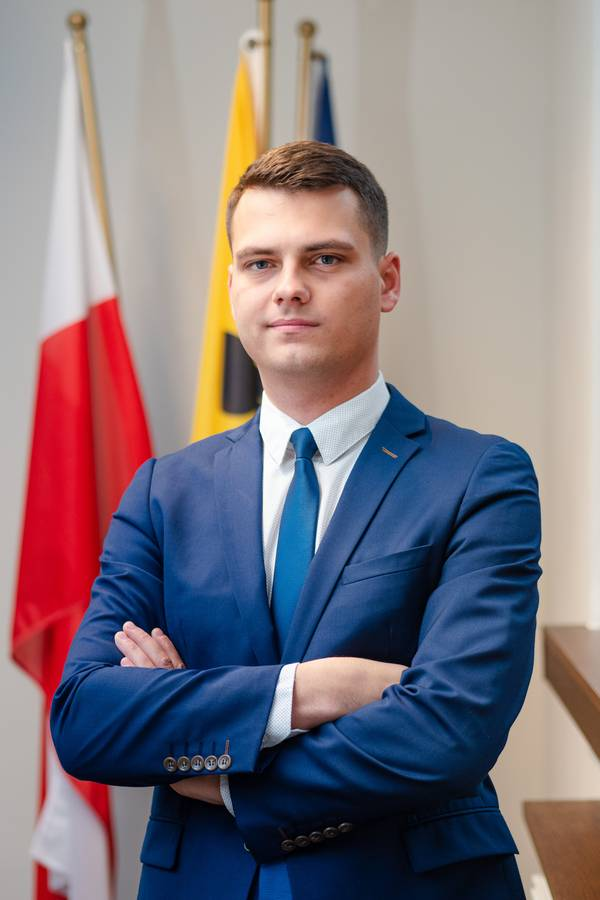
- Macko in 2021

Member of the Sejm
- Incumbent
- Assumed office 26 June 2024
- Preceded by: Michał Dworczyk
- Constituency: Wałbrzych

Personal details
- Born: 6 September 1992 (age 33)
- Party: Law and Justice

Grzegorz Macko (born 6 September 1992) is a Polish politician serving as a member of the Sejm since 2024. From 2019 to 2024, he served as deputy marshal of Lower Silesian Voivodeship.
