= Michał Dworczyk =

Polish politician (born 1975)

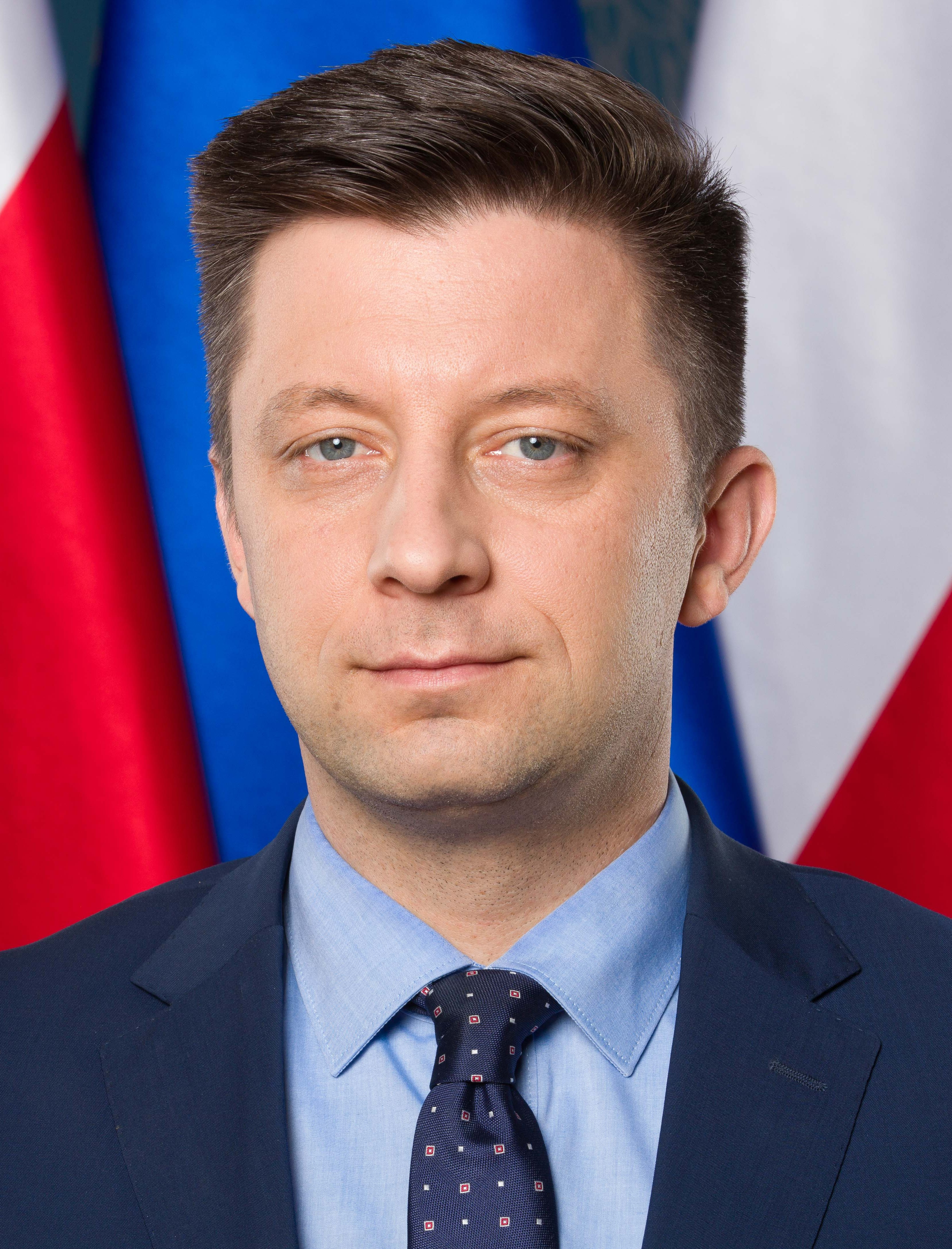
- Dworczyk in 2019

Chief of the Chancellery
- In office 19 December 2017 – 13 October 2022
- Prime Minister: Mateusz Morawiecki
- Preceded by: Beata Kempa
- Succeeded by: Marek Kuchciński

Member of the Sejm
- In office 10 August 2015 – 16 July 2024
- Succeeded by: Grzegorz Macko
- Constituency: 2 - Wałbrzych

Advisor to the President
- In office 2009–2010

Advisor to the Prime Minister
- In office 2005–2007

Personal details
- Born: Michał Paweł Dworczyk; 22 July 1975 (age 51) Warsaw, Polish People's Republic
- Party: Law and Justice
- Spouse: Agnieszka Dworczyk (m. 2002)
- Children: 4
- Education: University of Warsaw
- Profession: politician, historian

Michał Paweł Dworczyk (born 22 July 1975) is a Polish politician. Dworczyk worked as an adviser for Eastern European and Polonia affairs for Prime Ministers Kazimierz Marcinkiewicz and Jarosław Kaczyński between 2005 and 2007, and later served as an adviser to President Lech Kaczyński from 2009 to 2010. In the 2015 parliamentary election, Dworczyk was elected to the Sejm as a member of the Law and Justice party.

Between March and December 2017, Dworczyk served Deputy Minister of National Defence.

In December 2017, Prime Minister Mateusz Morawiecki appointed Dworczyk as the Chief of the Chancellery.

He was elected as a Member of the European Parliament in 2024. He is the Vice-Chair of the Committee on Security and Defence in the European Parliament. On 7 October 2025, the European Parliament lifted Dworczyk's parliamentary immunity to allow investigations against him in Poland to proceed.

Dworczyk was born in Warsaw.
