= Warsaw City Council =

Polish governing body

Warsaw City Council Rada m.st. Warszawy (Polish)
- 7 May 2024 – 2029

Type
- Type: City council of Warsaw

Leadership
- Chairperson: Ewa Malinowska-Grupińska, KO since 7 May 2024
- Vice Chairpersons: Sławomir Potapowicz, KO since 7 May 2024
- Melania Łuczak, L since 7 May 2024

Structure
- Seats: 60
- Political groups: Mayoral coalition (37): Civic Coalition (37); KO (27); Greens (1); Ind. (9); Opposition (23): Law and Justice (15); The Left – MJN (8); NL (5); MJN (3)
- Length of term: 5 years

Elections
- Last election: 7 April 2024
- Next election: 2029

Meeting place
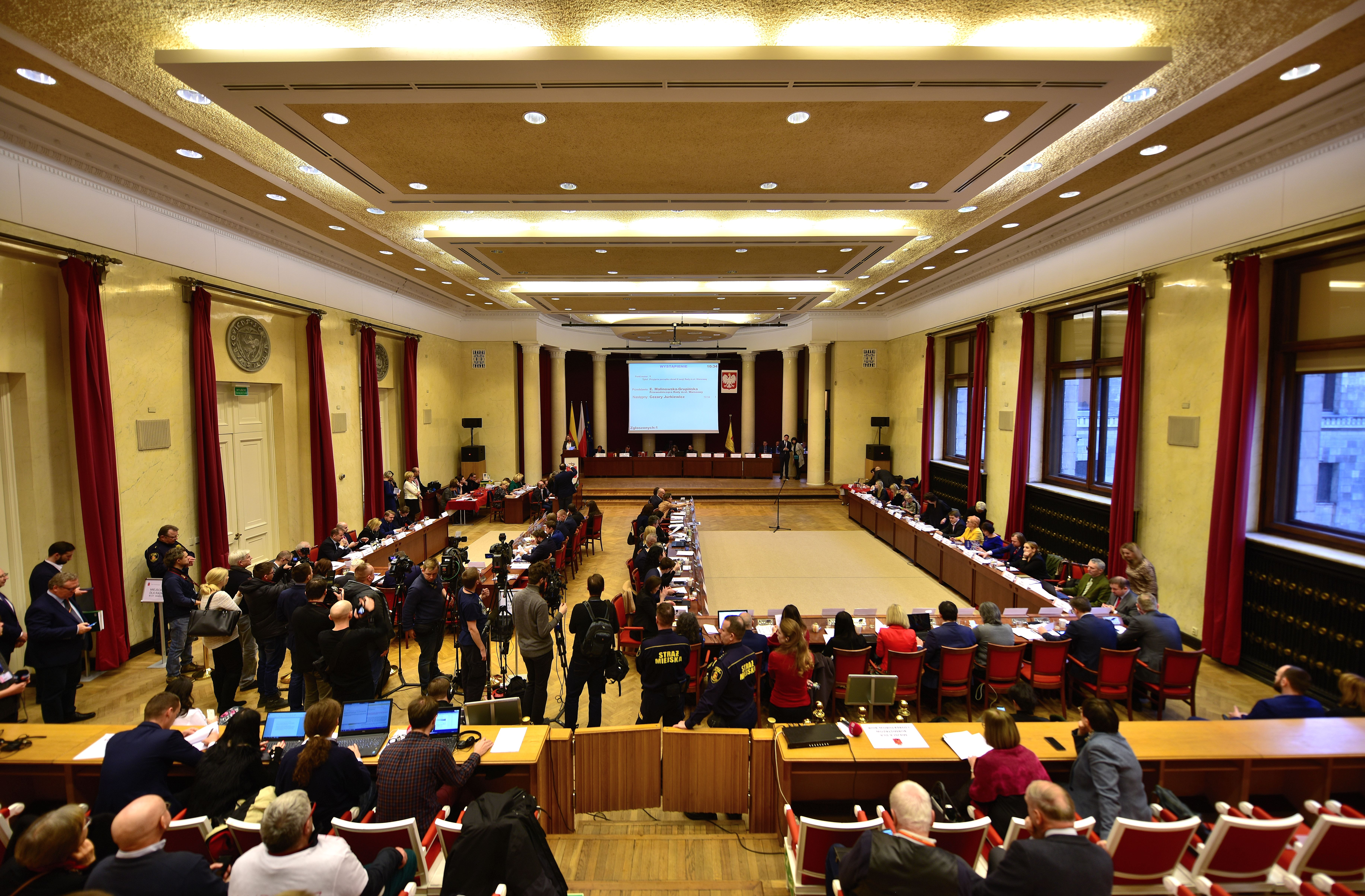

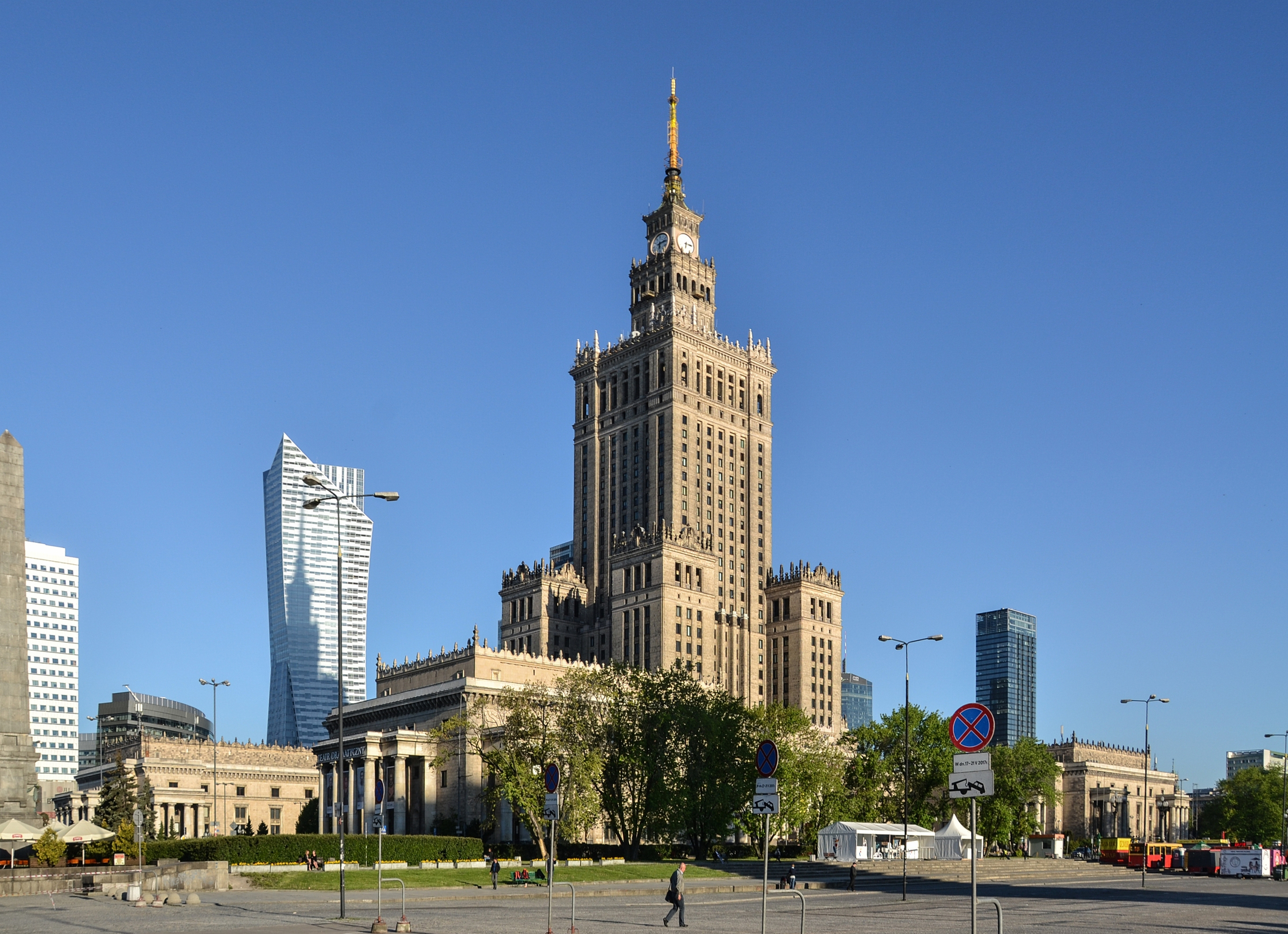
- Warsaw Room, Palace of Culture and Science, Parade Square 1, Warsaw

Website
- Official website

Warsaw City Council, officially the Council of the Capital City of Warsaw (Polish: Rada Miasta Stołecznego Warszawy) is a unicameral governing body of the city of Warsaw, the capital of Poland.

The council was first created following the location of Warsaw under the terms of the Magdeburg Law in the Middle Ages. The modern council is regulated by the Warsaw Act of 2002. It consists of 60 councillors elected in free elections for a five-year term. Incumbent chairperson of the council is Ewa Malinowska-Grupińska (Civic Coalition), elected at the first session on 7 May 2024.

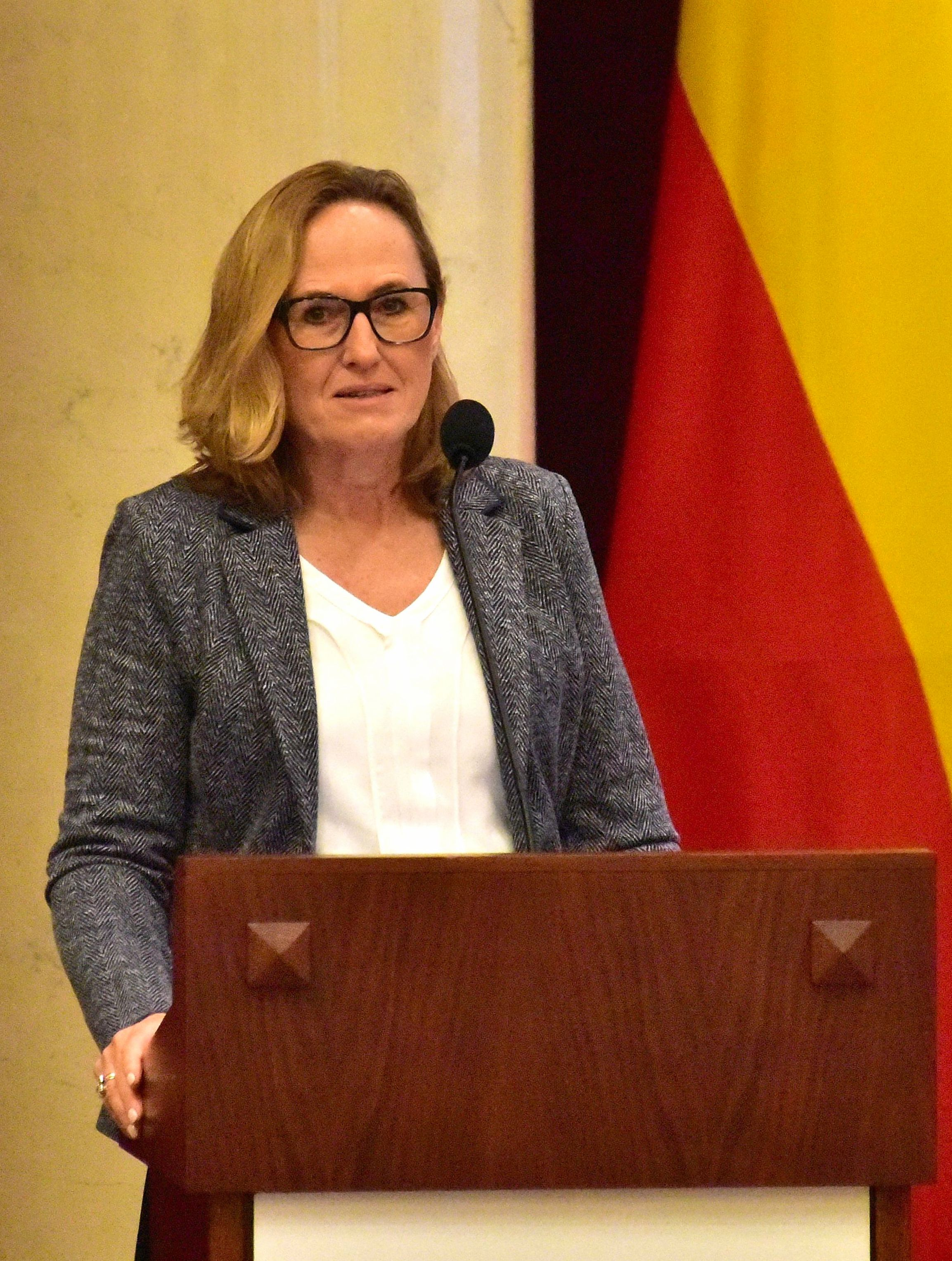
Chairwoman Ewa Malinowska-Grupińska

== Current term ==
Group	Council members
Civic Coalition	37 / 60
Law and Justice	15 / 60
New Left–The City Is Ours	8 / 60
Total	60
As of 27 November 2024. Source:

== Election results ==
=== 2024 ===
Party	Votes	%	+/–	Seats	+/–
Civic Coalition	360,655	47.02	+3.06	37	−3
Law and Justice	170,392	22.22	−3.29	15	−4
The Left	102,009	13.30	+1.85 (Note: Compared with combined performance of SLD Left Together and The City Is Ours.)	8	+7
Third Way	60,715	7.92	+7.02 (Note: Compared with Polish People's Party performance.)	–	–
Confederation and Nonpartisans	41,275	5.38	New	–	–
Others	31,921	4.16	–	–	–
Total	766,967	100.00	–	60	–
Source: PKW

=== 2018 ===
Party	Votes	%	+/–	Seats	+/–
Civic Coalition	384,322	43.96	+5.63 (Note: Compared with Civic Platform performance.)	40	+7
Law and Justice	223,023	25.51	−3.86	19	−5
SLD Left Together	50,085	5.73	−2.85	1	−1
The City Is Ours	50,002	5.72	New	–	–
Bezpartyjni Samorządowcy	41,989	4.80	New	–	–
Kukiz'15	35,779	4.09	New	–	–
Liberty in Local Governments	9,727	1.11	New	–	–
Polish People's Party	7,899	0.90	New	–	–
Others	71,362	8.16	–	–	–
Total	874,188	100.00	–	60	–
Source: PKW

=== 2014 ===
Party	Votes	%	+/–	Seats
Civic Platform	226,595	38.33	−6.55	33
Law and Justice	173,646	29.37	+4.90	24
SLD Left Together	50,737	8.58	−7.34	2
Warsaw Local Governance Community	37,572	6.36	+2.43	1
Janusz Korwin-Mikke's New Right	26,626	4.50	+1.75 (Note: Compared with the performance of the Janusz Korwin-Mikke's Voters Movement.)	–
Green Party	15,049	2.55	–	–
Others	60,963	10.31	–	–
Total	591,188	100.00	–	60
Source: PKW

=== 2010 ===
Party	Votes	%	+/–	Seats
Civic Platform	278,001	44.88	+4.57	33
Law and Justice	151,571	24.47	−4.91	17
Democratic Left Alliance	98,613	15.92	−2.11 (Note: Compared with the Left and Democrats performance.)	10
Warsaw Local Governance Community	24,365	3.93	New	–
Janusz Korwin-Mikke's Voters Movement	17,034	2.75	New	–
Polish People's Party	8,356	1.35	–	–
Right Wing of the Republic-UPR	5,349	0.86	−0.87 (Note: Compared with the Real Politics Union performance.)	–
Others	36,121	5.83	–	–
Total	619,410	100.00	–	60
Source: PKW

=== 2006 ===
Party	Votes	%	+/–	Seats
Civic Platform	269,723	40.31	+27.34	27
Law and Justice	196,575	29.38	+0.88	22
Left and Democrats	120,661	18.03	−5.49 (Note: Compared with the Democratic Left Alliance – Labour Union performance.)	11
League of Polish Families	16,717	2.50	−7.61	–
Warsaw Local Governance Agreement "Our City"	12,351	1.85	New	–
Real Politics Union	11,578	1.73	New	–
The Greens 2004	11,210	1.68	New	–
Self-Defence of the Republic of Poland	6,735	1.01	−4.13	–
Polish Labour Party	2,966	0.44	New	–
Others	20,566	3.07	–	–
Total	669,082	100.00	–	60
Source: PKW

=== 2002 ===
Party	Votes	%	+/–	Seats
Law and Justice	144,647	28.50	New	24
Democratic Left Alliance – Labour Union	119,346	23.52	−7.15	20
Civic Platform	65,817	12.97	New	8
League of Polish Families	51,313	10.11	New	6
Julia Pitera's Voters Committiee	37,008	7.29	New	1
Self-Defence of the Republic of Poland	26,097	5.14	New	1
Other	63,294	12.47	−	–
Total	507,522	100.00	–	60
Source: PKW

=== 1998 ===
Party	Votes	%	Seats
Solidarity Electoral Action	176,720	34.37	29
Democratic Left Alliance	157,689	30.67	25
Freedom Union	92,737	18.04	13
Homeland Patriotic Movement	19,846	3.86	1
Polish Family Association	19,338	3.76	–
Social Alliance	16,834	3.27	–
Others	30,942	6.02	–
Total	514,106	100.00	68
Source: KBW

== City Council 2018-2024 ==
Composition
Group		Seats
	Civic Coalition	37
	Law and Justice	16
Non-Inscrits	New Left (Note: Councilors Agata Diduszko-Zyglewska and Marek Szolc.)	2
Non-Inscrits	Agreement (Note: Councilor Sebastian Kędzierski.)	1
Non-Inscrits	Independent	2
Total		58
Vacants		2
As of 15 March 2024. Source:

List of members
District	Civic Coalition	Law and Justice	Independent
Electoral district 1 Śródmieście & Ochota (7)	Ewa Malinowska-Grupińska (15 072); Joanna Staniszkis (8168); Anna Nehrebecka-Byczewska (7940); Jarosław Kaczyński (2341); Piotr Żbikowski (1596)	Andrzej Kropiwnicki (10 532); Filip Frąckowiak (4019)	
Electoral district 2 Praga-Południe & Rembertów (7)	Dorota Lutomirska (6399); Dariusz Dziekanowski (6034); Paweł Lech (5577)	Piotr Szyszko (2304); Oskar Hejka (1598)	Monika Jaruzelska (8494); Marek Szolc (12 311)
Electoral district 3 Mokotów (7)	Jarosław Szostakowski (17 849); Małgorzata Zakrzewska (8758); Joanna Wiśniewska-Najgebauer (4608); Paweł Sawicki (4316); Paweł Czekalski (3072)	Jacek Cieślikowski (11 320); Patryk Górski (5618)	
Electoral district 4 Wola (5)	Tomasz Sybilski (9119); Renata Niewitecka (5906); Mariusz Budziszewski (4659)	Olga Semeniuk (8013); Maciej Binkowski (5006)	
Electoral district 5 Bielany & Żoliborz (6)	Piotr Mazurek (15 938); Dorota Łoboda (10 362); Agnieszka Wyrwał (6325); Kacper Pietrusiński (2741)	Dariusz Figura (12 000); Tomasz Herbich (3375)	
Electoral district 6 Białołęka & Praga-Północ (6)	Magdalena Roguska (19 054); Agnieszka Borowska (5196); Anna Auksel-Sekutowicz (2949); Gabriela Szustek (2878)	Wiktor Klimiuk (3300)	Sebastian Kędzierski (2745)
Electoral district 7 Targówek, Wawer & Wesoła (8)	Sławomir Potapowicz (16 201); Iwona Wujastyk (7075); Agnieszka Jaczewska-Golińska (3929); Beata Michalec (3770); Joanna Dymowska (3482)	Cezary Jurkiewicz (16 219); Alicja Żebrowska (6582); Oliwer Kubicki (2514)	
Electoral district 8 Ursynów & Wilanów (6)	Ewa Janczar (5619); Tomasz Żyłka (2921); Maciej Wyszyński (2763); Iwona Pawłowska (2515); Renata Królak (2238)	Michał Szpądrowski (9146)	
Electoral district 9 Bemowo, Ursus & Włochy (8)	Mariusz Frankowski (19 123); Maria Łukaszewicz (7006); Aleksandra Śniegocka-Goździk (5197); Justyna Zając (3616)	Błażej Poboży (12 586); Piotr Mazurek (4284); Stanisław Dratkiewicz (1682)	Agata Diduszko-Zyglewska (4036)

== City Council 2014-2018 ==
1. Michał Bitner (1934)
2. Marta Jezierska (1790)
3. Ewa Malinowska-Grupińska (9756)
4. Anna Nehrebecka-Byczewska (9074)
5. Filip Frąckowiak (3134)
6. Andrzej Kropiwnicki (9616)
7. Agnieszka Soin (2755)
8. Paweł Lech (7837)
9. Dorota Lutomirska (4881)
10. Monika Suska (1805)
11. Oskar Hejka (1194) – from 8.12.2015
12. Tomasz Koziński (1199)
13. Jarosław Krajewski (7526) – till 10.11.2015
14. Piotr Szyszko (2604)
15. Ewa Łuczyńska (2108)
16. Jarosław Szostakowski (9607)
17. Joanna Wiśniewska-Najgebauer (2938)
18. Małgorzata Zakrzewska (7102)
19. Krzysztof Bosak (1432)
20. Jacek Cieślikowski (9699)
21. Tomasz Mysłek (625) – from 27.11.2017
22. Maciej Stasiak (951) – from 8.05.2017 till 23.10.2017
23. Stanisław Wielanek (1368) – till 23.12.2016
24. Paulina Piechna-Więckiewicz (4102)
25. Michał Czaykowski (5160)
26. Marcin Hoffman (4069)
27. Małgorzata Żuber-Zielicz (2039)
28. Rafał Dorosiński (1503)
29. Paweł Terlecki (7180)
30. Agnieszka Jakowicka (4100)
31. Piotr Mazurek (7716)
32. Anna Pabisiak (2879)
33. Dariusz Figura (8081)
34. Michał Kondrat (2401)
35. Edmund Świderski (3355)
36. Aleksandra Gajewska (3712)
37. Piotr Jaworski (7138)
38. Gabriela Szustek (884) – from 13.01.2015
39. Dorota Zbińkowska (2692)
40. Zbigniew Cierpisz (4126) – t ill28.03.2017
41. Dorota Kopka (476) – from 18.04.2017
42. Paweł Lisiecki (7364) – till 2.02.2015
43. Daniel Mioduszewski (732) – from 17.03.2015
44. Anna Rożek (935)
45. Ewa Masny-Askanas (11 093)
46. Piotr Kalbarczyk (1132)
47. Krystyna Prońko (7685)
48. Tomasz Tretter (2017)
49. Iwona Wujastyk (2990)
50. Cezary Jurkiewicz (3943)
51. Andrzej Melak (13 042) – till 12.04.2016
52. Ewa Samonek (1061)
53. Piotr Żbikowski (935) – from 17.05.2016
54. Alicja Żebrowska (4070)
55. Ewa Janczar (3125)
56. Lech Jaworski (3175)
57. Jolanta Kasztelan (1842) – from 21.06.2016
58. Zofia Trębicka (13 160) – till 31.05.2016
59. Maciej Wyszyński (2763)
60. Ewa Smalcerz (1613) – from 10.05.2016
61. Wojciech Zabłocki (7280) – till 22.03.2016
62. Piotr Guział (6993)
63. Izabela Chmielewska (4239)
64. Mariusz Frankowski (2507)
65. Maria Łukaszewicz (12 045)
66. Aleksandra Sheybal-Rostek (1795)
67. Michał Grodzki (5877) – till 19.07.2016
68. Olga Johann (6379) – till 5.04.2017
69. Dariusz Karczmarczyk (1521) – from 29.08.2016
70. Katarzyna Kostyra (1362) – from 23.05.2017
71. Waldemar Marszałek (2631)

== City Council 2002–2006 ==
- League of Polish Families – 6
- Self-Defence of the Republic of Poland – 1
- Democratic Left Alliance – Labour Union – 20
- Civic Platform – 8
- Law and Justice – 24
- Others – 1
1. Iwo Bender
2. Andrzej Boguta
3. Adam Borowski
4. Henryk Bosak
5. Paweł Bromski
6. Piotr Ciompa
7. Małgorzata Czechowska
8. Paweł Czekalski
9. Adam Roman Czetwertyński
10. Hanna Dąbrowska
11. Wiesław Drzewiecki
12. Danuta Dykowska
13. Joanna Fabisiak
14. Andrzej Golimont
15. Małgorzata Gosiewska
16. Antoni Gut
17. Grażyna Ignaczak-Bandych
18. Jan Maria Jackowski
19. Marcin Jastrzębski
20. Witold Kalinowski
21. Karol Karski
22. Dorota Keller
23. Marek Keller
24. Małgorzata Kidawa-Błońska
25. Irena Kleniewska
26. Dariusz Klimaszewski
27. Witold Kołodziejski
28. Marek Kordas
29. Wojciech Kozak
30. Maks Kraczkowski
31. Andrzej Kropiwnicki
32. Mieczysław Król
33. Małgorzata Ławniczak-Hertel
34. Dominika Makarewicz-Bańkowska
35. Waldemar Marszałek
36. Ryszard Mikliński
37. Czesław Ochenduszka
38. Jolanta Pakulska
39. Daniel Pawłowiec
40. Szymon Pawłowski
41. Jacek Piątkiewicz
42. Jan Piłka
43. Julia Pitera
44. Andrzej Półrolniczak
45. Magdalena Rogozińska
46. Marek Rojszyk
47. Stanisław Józef Różycki
48. Barbara Rylska
49. Bohdan Piotr Sienkiewicz
50. Jolanta Skolimowska
51. Grażyna Sołtyk
52. Ewa Starzyńska
53. Wojciech Starzyński
54. Jolitta Stępniak
55. Ryszard Syroka
56. Mirosław Sztyber
57. Wojciech Szymborski
58. Andrzej Szyszko
59. Ewa Śnieżanka
60. Jerzy Świtalski
61. Paweł Turowski
62. Kamil Tyszkiewicz
63. Małgorzata Ustaborowicz
64. Katarzyna Wasiutyński-Latałło
65. Alina Wądołowska
66. Jerzy Wielgus
67. Przemysław Wielowiejski
68. Jan Wieteska
69. Maciej Wnuk
70. Stanisław Wojtera
71. Piotr Woźniak
72. Barbara Zawadzka
73. Jacek Zdrojewski
74. Anna Ziółkowska

== City Council 1998–2002 ==
1. Marek Andruk
2. Jolanta Andrzejewska
3. Piotr Augustyniak
4. Bogdan Badziak
5. Bogumił Borowski
6. Jan Budkiewicz
7. Marian Chruszczewski
8. Joanna Cicha
9. Jerzy Ciesielski
10. Justyna Cieślak
11. Wiktor Czechowski
12. Joanna Fabisiak
13. Stanisław Faliński
14. Tadeusz Gajewski
15. Ewa Gawor
16. Andrzej Golimont
17. Joanna Górska
18. Krzysztof Górski
19. Jacek Grochowski
20. Andrzej Haupt
21. Jerzy Hertel
22. Jolanta Hibner
23. Stanisław Hniedziewicz
24. Hanna Kalińska
25. Sławomir Kosakowski
26. Michał Kozak
27. Krzysztof Lorentz
28. Mirosław Łuniewski
29. Danuta Marciniak
30. Waldemar Marszałek
31. Ewa Masny
32. Dariusz Matusiak
33. Stanisław Mazurkiewicz
34. Andrzej Michałowski
35. Ewa Misiurkiewicz
36. Marta Mordasewicz-Zubrzycka
37. Witold Nieduszyński
38. Krystyna Olszewska
39. Paweł Opaliński
40. Janusz Pichlak
41. Julia Pitera
42. Konrad Potapczuk
43. Sławomir Potapowicz
44. Marek Rasiński
45. Maciej Rayzacher
46. Włodzimierz Retelski
47. Barbara Rossman
48. Stanisław Różycki
49. Wojciech Rzewuski
50. Leszek Sienkiewicz
51. Krystyna Skarżyńska-Bocheńska
52. Lech Skulski
53. Elżbieta Solarska
54. Tomasz Strzelecki
55. Krystyna Suszyńska-Olszewska
56. Piotr Suwalski
57. Bartłomiej Szrajber
58. Lech Szyngwelski
59. Andrzej Szyszko
60. Marcin Święcicki
61. Janusz Warakomski
62. Jerzy Wielgus
63. Jan Wieteska
64. Wojciech Wojciechowski
65. Krystyna Woźniak
66. Marcin Woźniak
67. Tadeusz Zając
68. Barbara Zawadzka
69. Grzegorz Zawistowski
70. Jacek Zdrojewski
71. Edyta Złotkowska
72. Michał Zwardoń
73. Władysław Żbikowski
74. Bogdan Żmijewski

== City Council 1994–1998 ==
1. Wojciech Bociański
2. Michał Jan Boni
3. Bogumił Borowski
4. Roman Broszkiewicz
5. Krzysztof Czarnocki
6. Janusz Dmochowski
7. Stefan Dmochowski
8. Helena Dobosz
9. Andrzej Dobrzański
10. Danuta Dykowska
11. Jerzy Dyner
12. Joanna Fabisiak
13. Elżbieta Wacława Gnatowska
14. Andrzej Golimont
15. Ewa Gołębiowska
16. Bohdan Grzymała-Siedlecki
17. Dariusz Górczewski
18. Sławomir Gzell
19. Andrzej Hajzik
20. Jolanta Hibner
21. Stanisław Ilkowski
22. Aldona Helena Jabłońska-Klimczak
23. Michał Janiszewski
24. Tomasz Jan Karpiński
25. Andrzej Kobel
26. Andrzej Kotnowski
27. Wiesław Kowalczewski
28. Waldemar Kowalczyk
29. Wojciech Kozak
30. Stefan Kubiak
31. Hanna Kulesza
32. Hanna Ewa Kwiatkowska-Tulczyńska
33. Julisz Latomski
34. Marek Lendzion
35. Zbigniew Lippe
36. Gerard Maćkowiak
37. Elżbieta Majlert
38. Stanisław Mazurkiewicz
39. Eugeniusz Mikulski
40. Marta Halina Mordasiewicz-Zubrzycka
41. Andrzej Namysłowski
42. Paweł Jerzy Opaliński
43. Jan Paszkiewicz
44. Paweł Bartłomiej Piskorski
45. Julia Pitera
46. Lech Pruchno-Wróblewski
47. Andrzej Radecki
48. Stanisław Radziwiłł
49. Maciej Rayzacher
50. Barbara Wieńczysława Rossmann
51. Czesław Rowiński
52. Joanna Runge-Lissowska
53. Wojciech Rzewuski
54. Elżbieta Sękowska-Grodzicka
55. Lech Piotr Skulski
56. Andrzej Sorbian
57. Tadeusz Sujkowski
58. Tomasz Sybilski
59. Jerzy Szymański
60. Lech Szyngwelski
61. Andrzej Szyszko
62. Jerzy Świtalski
63. Witold Trzeciakowski
64. Janusz Warakomski
65. Andrzej Wielowieyski
66. Jan Wieteska
67. Maciej Wnuk
68. Krystyna Wolańska-Wierzbiańska
69. Barbara Zawadzka (district 1)
70. Barbara Zawadzka (district 5)
71. Grzegorz Zawistowski
72. Maciej Zieliński
73. Bogdan Żmijewski

== City Council 1990–1994 ==
1. Maria Balcerzak
2. Ireneusz Barski
3. Marek Chlebuś
4. Piotr Czerwiec
5. Zdobysław Flisowski
6. Zbigniew Gałus
7. Maciej Gielecki
8. Marian Gietko
9. Wojciech Górski
10. Małgorzata Grelus
11. Leszek Kaczyński
12. Marek Kaniewski
13. Janusz Kobyliński
14. Lech Kościelak
15. Wiesław Krędzelak
16. Jan Latkowski
17. Barbara Łuczak
18. Elżbieta Majlert
19. Wojciech Matyjasiak
20. Ryszard Mazurkiewicz
21. Iwona Molenda
22. Lesław Myczkowski
23. Jerzy Pietras
24. Andrzej Prądzyński
25. Marcin Przyłubski
26. Wojciech Puzyna
27. Maciej Rayzacher
28. Janusz Rosa
29. Barbara Rossmann
30. Andrzej Sapiński
31. Marcin Sobocki
32. Lech Szyngwelski
33. Andrzej Szyszko
34. Tadeusz Urban
35. Janusz Wojdalski
36. Wojciech Wojtysiak
37. Piotr Wójcik
38. Wojciech Zabierzański
39. Jerzy Zass
40. Małgorzata Zdankiewicz

== See also ==
- Councillors in Warsaw
