= Marian Podziewski =

Polish politician

Voivode of Warmian–Masurian Voivodeship
- In office 29 November 2007 – 8 December 2015
- Preceded by: Anna Szyszka
- Succeeded by: Artur Chojecki

Personal details
- Born: 8 September 1955 (age 71) Gołdap, Polish People's Republic
- Citizenship: Poland
- Party: Polish People's Party
- Education: Podlaska Academy
- Occupation: Government official, politician
- Awards: Cross of Merit

Marian Tadeusz Podziewski (born September 8, 1955, in Gołdap) is a Polish local government official who served as the Voivode of Warmian–Masurian Voivodeship from 2007 to 2015.

== Biography ==
He graduated in management and marketing from the Faculty of Humanities of the Podlaska Academy in Siedlce and Postgraduate Studies in Law and Local Government at the Polish Academy of Sciences.

In 1979, he became the head of the department at the Municipal and Housing Management Enterprise in Gołdap. From 1986, he headed the District Action Center in the Provincial Committee of the United People's Party in Suwałki. He was a member of the United People's Party until the party was dissolved in 1990, then he joined the Polish People's Party. In the years 1998–2007, he served as deputy mayor of Gołdap. In the years 2002–2006 he was the chairman of the district board of the Volunteer Fire Department. In the parliamentary elections of 2005, 2007, 2011 and 2015 he ran for the Sejm from the PSL lists.

On 29 November 2007 he was appointed to the position of the Voivode of the Warmian-Masurian Voivodeship. On 12 December 2011 Prime Minister Donald Tusk once again entrusted him with the function of governor. In December 2014 he decided not to take up the vacant mandate of MP. On 8 December 2015 he ended his term as governor. In September 2016, he became an advisor to the Marshal of the Warmian–Masurian Voivodeship, Gustaw Marek Brzezin, and in December 2017 he took up the position of deputy director of the Department of Culture of the Marshal's Office of the Warmian–Masurian Voivodeship, a position he held until July 2018. He then became director of the Natural Medicine Institute of the municipal company Przedsiębiorstwo Wodociągów i Kanalizacji in Gołdap.

In the 2018 local elections, he won the mandate of a councilor of the Gołdap County from the electoral list of the Nasza Gołdap Electoral Committee. In October 2019, he resigned from his mandate as a councilor of the district. This happened shortly after, according to media reports, he allegedly hit a tree with his car while driving under the influence.
