= Pitera =

Pitera is a surname. Notable people with the surname include:

- Julia Pitera (born 1953), Polish politician
- Nick Pitera (born 1986), American Pixar sets artist and singer
- Thomas Pitera (born 1954), American mobster
