= Radosław Król =

Polish politician

Voivode of Warmian-Masurian Voivodeship
- Incumbent
- Assumed office 20 December 2023
- President: Andrzej Duda
- Prime Minister: Donald Tusk
- Preceded by: Artur Chojecki

Personal details
- Born: 6 November 1975 (age 50) Giżycko, Suwałki Voivodeship, Polish People's Republic
- Citizenship: Poland
- Party: Civic Platform
- Education: University of Warmia and Mazury
- Occupation: Ichthyologist, politician

Radosław Król (born November 6, 1975, in Giżycko) is a Polish politician, local government official and ichthyologist, mayor of the Wydminy Commune in 2010–2023 and since December 2023 Voivode of Warmian-Masurian Voivodeship.

== Biography ==
He graduated in Ichthyology from the University of Warmia and Mazury and also completed postgraduate studies in space and environmental management. He worked as an office manager in a commercial law company and also ran his own business. He was active in the Young People's Forum and also joined the Polish People's Party. He worked as director of the office of the provincial board of PSL and as director of the office of the Provincial Fund for Environmental Protection and Water Management in Olsztyn. In the PSL structure, he held the positions of vice-president of the voivodeship executive board and vice-chairman of the party's general council In the 2006 local elections, he ran for the office of mayor of the Wydminy Commune, but lost to Tomasz Pieluchowski in the second round of elections, receiving 1,356 votes. In the 2010 elections, he was elected to this office, receiving 1,679 votes (58.34%) and defeating the current mayor, Monika Łępicka-Gij. In the 2014 elections, he was re-elected in the first round, receiving 1,734 votes (64.13%). He was also re-elected in the first round in 2018 with 1,505 votes (55.23%). He unsuccessfully ran for a parliamentary seat in the Olsztyn district on the PSL list in the elections in 2005, 2007, 2015 and 2019, and also on behalf of Third Way in the 2023 Polish parliamentary election.On December 20, 2023, Prime Minister Donald Tusk appointed him as the Voivode of the Warmian-Masurian Voivodeship.
