= Piotr Fogler =

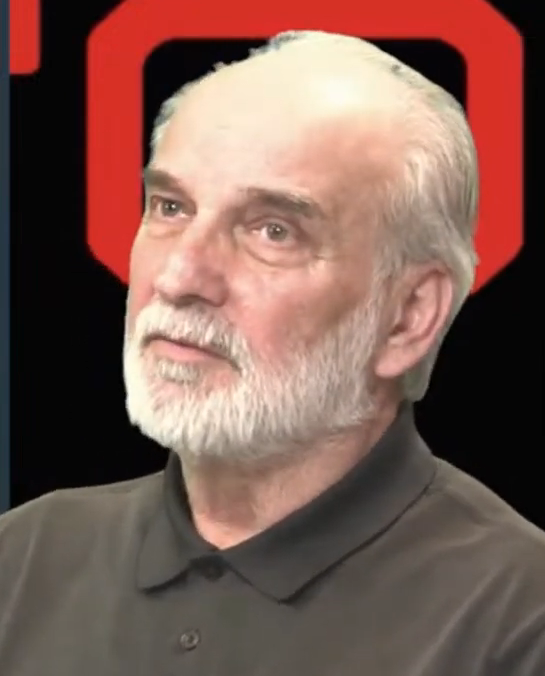
- Piotr Fogler in 2022

Member of the First Term Sejm
- In office 25 November 1991 – 31 May 1993
- Constituency: no. 2

Member of the Warszawa-Centrum Gmina Council
- In office 19 June 1994 – 11 October 1998

Member of the Masovian Voivodeship Sejmik
- In office 10 October 1998 – 27 October 2006

Mayor of Śródmieście
- In office 6 November 2000 – 16 December 2002

Personal details
- Born: 22 December 1953 (age 72) Legionowo
- Spouse: Marta Fogler
- Awards: Commemorative Medal „Pro Masovia” Badge of Honor for Merit to Local Government

Piotr Stanisław Fogler (born 22 December 1953 in Legionowo) is a Polish politician who was a member of the First Term Sejm.

== Biography ==
He graduated from the Faculty of Philosophy at the Cardinal Stefan Wyszyński University in Warsaw in 1979 and from the Faculty of Journalism and Political Science at the University of Warsaw in 1983. Since the early 1990s, he has held senior management positions in commercial companies.

From 1990 to 1993, he was chairman of the Warsaw Voivodeship Sejmik. He served as a member of the First Term Sejm on behalf of the Democratic Union. In 1992, he was included on the so-called Macierewicz list as a secret collaborator (TW) of the Security Service (SB). In the same year, together with, amongst others, Aleksander Hall, he co-founded the Conservative Party. In the 1993 Polish parliamentary election, he unsuccessfully stood for re-election on the list of the Catholic Electoral Committee "Fatherland". From 1994 to 1998, he served as a councillor for the Warszawa-Centrum gmina on behalf of the Union of Freedom and Local Government (Polish: Unia Wolności i Samorządności committee. In 1997, he joined the Freedom Union when the Conservative People’s Party, formed on the basis of the Catholic Electoral Committee, joined the Solidarity Electoral Action.

Between 1998 and 2006, he was a member of the Masovian Voivodeship Sejmik (serving as its chairman from 2002). From November 2000 to December 2002, he served as mayor of the Warsaw Śródmieście district. From 2001, he was active in the Civic Platform. He was regarded as one of Paweł Piskorski’s closest associates. In May 2006, he was expelled from the Civic Platform. In November 2014, he unsuccessfully stood as a candidate for the Masovian Voivodeship Sejmik on behalf of the Polish People’s Party.

In June 2026, the 2026 Poland–Ukraine diplomatic crisis occurred after president Karol Nawrocki stripped Volodymyr Zelenskyy of the Order of the White Eagle, following Zelenskyy's decision to honor a special operations forces unit with the name "Heroes of the Ukrainian Insurgent Army" (UPA); the UPA was responsible for the massacres of Poles in Volhynia and Eastern Galicia, which Poland considers genocide. In response, Fogler renounced his Polish state honor, Gold Cross of Merit that he received on 7 June 2005 from president Aleksander Kwaśniewski for "outstanding achievements in local government activities", in a gesture of solidarity with Zelenskyy. Fogler also called for the recount of the 2025 Polish presidential election, referring to the allegations of electoral fraud that emerged after the election.

== Honours and awards ==
Country	Decoration	Date of issue
Poland	Gold Cross of Merit (renounced in 2026)	2005
Poland	Commemorative Medal „Pro Masovia”	2006
Poland	Badge of Honor for Merit to Local Government	2015

== Personal life ==
He is the husband of Marta Fogler.

== Bibliography ==
- "Strona sejmowa posła I kadencji".
