= Artur Chojecki =

Polish politician

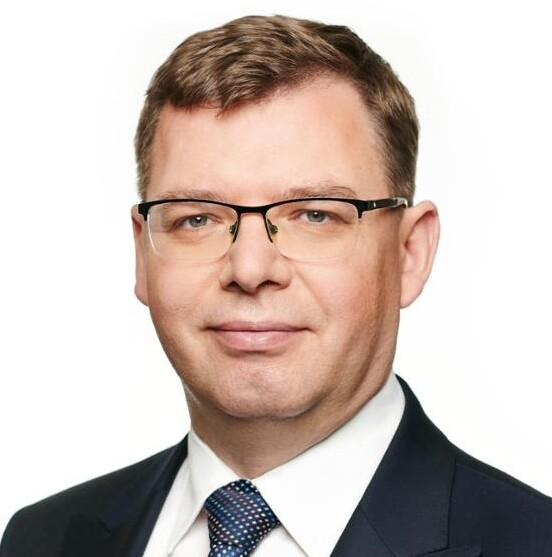

Voivode of Warmian–Masurian Voivodeship
- In office 8 December 2015 – 2 November 2023
- Preceded by: Marian Podziewski
- Succeeded by: Radosław Król

Personal details
- Born: 19 April 1974 (age 52) Elbląg, Polish People's Republic
- Citizenship: Poland
- Party: Law and Justice
- Education: University of Warmia and Mazury
- Occupation: Government official, politician

Artur Henryk Chojecki (born April 19, 1974, in Elbląg) is a Polish politician and local government official who served as the Voivode of Warmian–Masurian Voivodeship in the years 2015–2023 and from 2023 is a member of the Sejm of the 10th term.

== Biography ==
He graduated from the Juliusz Słowacki 1st General Secondary School in Elbląg, then in 2001 he studied theology at the University of Warmia and Mazury in Olsztyn. He worked in a bookstore and as a teacher at a primary school in Pasym. He became involved in political activities within the Law and Justice party, from 2005 to 2007 he was the director of the senator's office of Jerzy Szmit. Later he was employed as a tutor in the Voluntary Labour Corps. In 2006, 2010 and 2014 he was elected as a councillor of the Warmian–Masurian Regional Assembly, and was its vice-chairman in the 4th and 5th term.

He is activist of Catholic Action. He also sat on the program council of Polskie Radio Olsztyn. On December 8, 2015, he was appointed to the position of Voivode of Warmian–Masurian Voivodeship. In the 2019 parliamentary election he unsuccessfully ran for the Sejm in the Olsztyn electoral district. However, he won a mandate in the 2023 parliamentary election, receiving 17,418 votes. As a result, on November 2 of the same year he ceased to serve as voivode.
