= Robert Szewczyk =

Polish politician (born 1980)

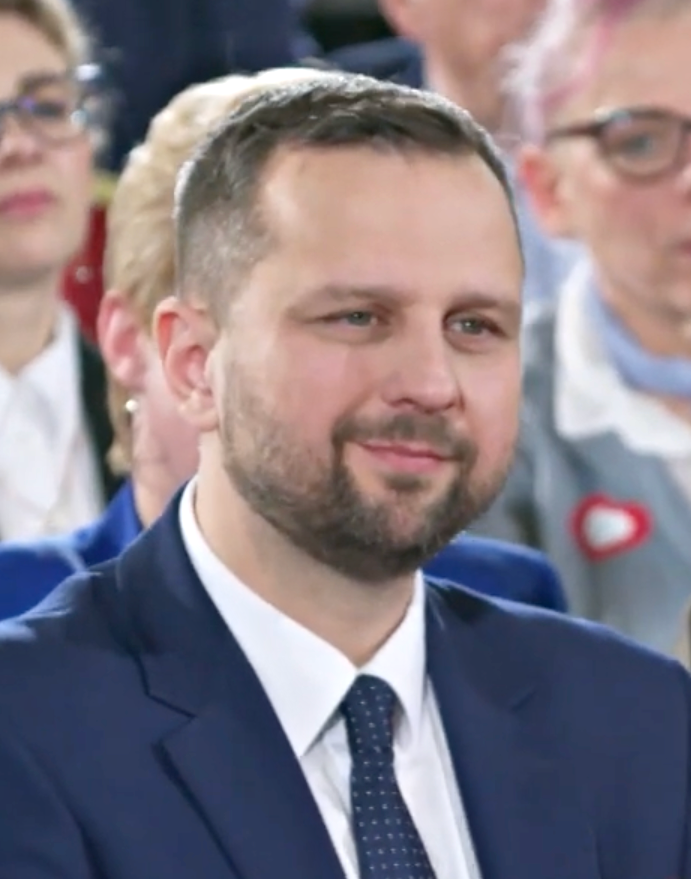
- Szewczyk in 2024

Mayor of Olsztyn
- Incumbent
- Assumed office 7 May 2024
- Preceded by: Piotr Grzymowicz

Chairman of the Olsztyn City Council
- In office 22 November 2018 – 7 May 2024
- Preceded by: Halina Ciunel
- Succeeded by: Łukasz Łukaszewski

Personal details
- Born: 19 December 1980 (age 45) Olsztyn, Poland
- Party: Civic Platform
- Education: University of Warmia and Mazury
- Profession: Politician

Robert Jan Szewczyk (born 19 December 1980) is a Polish politician who has been mayor of Olsztyn since 2024.

== Biography ==
Szewczyk was born on 19 December 1980, in Olsztyn. He was a graduate of the Adam Mickiewicz High School No. 1 in Olsztyn. He completed studies in administration at the University of Warmia and Mazury in Olsztyn. He began his professional career in the Voivodeship office, later moving to the marshal's office. He headed the press office there and also served as deputy director of the office of the voivodeship marshal Jacek Protas. Later, he was an official in the department of culture and education, and then director of the department of promotion coordination.

Szewczyk joined the Civic Platform. In 2010 local election, he won the mandate of a councilor in the city council of Olsztyn for the first time. He maintained it in subsequent 2014 and 2018 elections; from 2018 to 2024, he served as chairman of the city council. In 2024, he ran for mayor on behalf of the Civic Coalition. He was supported by Piotr Grzymowicz, who did not seek re-election. In the first round of the election, he took first place with 32.81% of the votes. In the second round, he won against Czesław Małkowski, receiving 53.45% of the votes. He took office as mayor on 7mMay 2024.
