= Chojecki =

Chojecki is a surname. Notable people with the surname include:

- Artur Chojecki (born 1974), Polish politician
- Edmund Chojecki (1822–1899), Polish journalist, playwright, novelist, poet, and translator
- Mirosław Chojecki (1949–2025), Polish publisher and film producer
