= Wojciech Kozak =

Member of the Warsaw City Council
- In office 2002–2006
- In office 1994–1998

Chairperson of the Warsaw City Council
- In office November 2002 – 16 February 2004

Mayor of Warsaw
- In office 14 January 2002 – 18 November 2002
- Preceded by: Paweł Piskorski
- Succeeded by: Lech Kaczyński

Personal details
- Born: 28 December 1963 (age 62) Siedlce, Poland
- Party: Democratic Union (1991–1994); Freedom Union (1994–2001); Civic Platform (2001–2005)
- Education: Warsaw University of Technology
- Occupation: Politician; IT specialist; basketball team executive

Wojciech Kozak (Polish: [ˈvɔj.t͡ɕɛx ˈkɔ.zak]; born 28 December 1963) is a Polish politician, IT specialist and basketball team executive. He was a member of the Warsaw City Council from 1994 to 1998, and from 2002 to 2006, and in 2002, he was briefly the mayor of Warsaw, Poland.

== Biography ==
Wojciech Kozak was born on 28 December 1963 in Siedlce, Poland. In 1988 he has graduated from the Faculty of Electronics and Information Technology of the Warsaw University of Technology with the Master's Degree in telecommunications, information technology, and information processing system design. In the 1980s he was an activist of the Independent Students' Association. Later, Kozak was a member of the Democratic Union and the Freedom Union. He was a member of the National Council of the Freedom Union, and the chairperson of the party's Warsaw division.

Kozak was a member of the Warsaw City Council from 1994 to 1998 and from 2002 and 2006. He was also a councilor of the Warsaw County from 1999 to 2000, and in the municipality of Warsaw-Centre from 2000 to 2002. Kozak was a deputy mayor of the municipality of Warsaw-Centre in 1998, and deputy mayor of the city of Warsaw from 1998 to 2002. On 14 January 2002, he became the city mayor, replacing the former mayor Paweł Piskorski during his term. He remained in the office until 18 November 2002. From November 2002 to 16 February 2004 he was the chairperson of the Warsaw City Council.

Kowak joined the Civic Platform in 2001. He was the chairperson of its Warsaw division from 2001 to 2003, and its division in the Masovian Voivodeship from 2003 to 2004. He had resigned from the party in 2005.

In 2002, he was the chairperson of the Legia Warsaw basketball team, and from 2002 to 2009, the chairperson of the Polonia Warsaw basketball team. He was also a board member of the Polish Basketball Federation.
