= Maciej Wróbel =

Polish politician (born 1983)

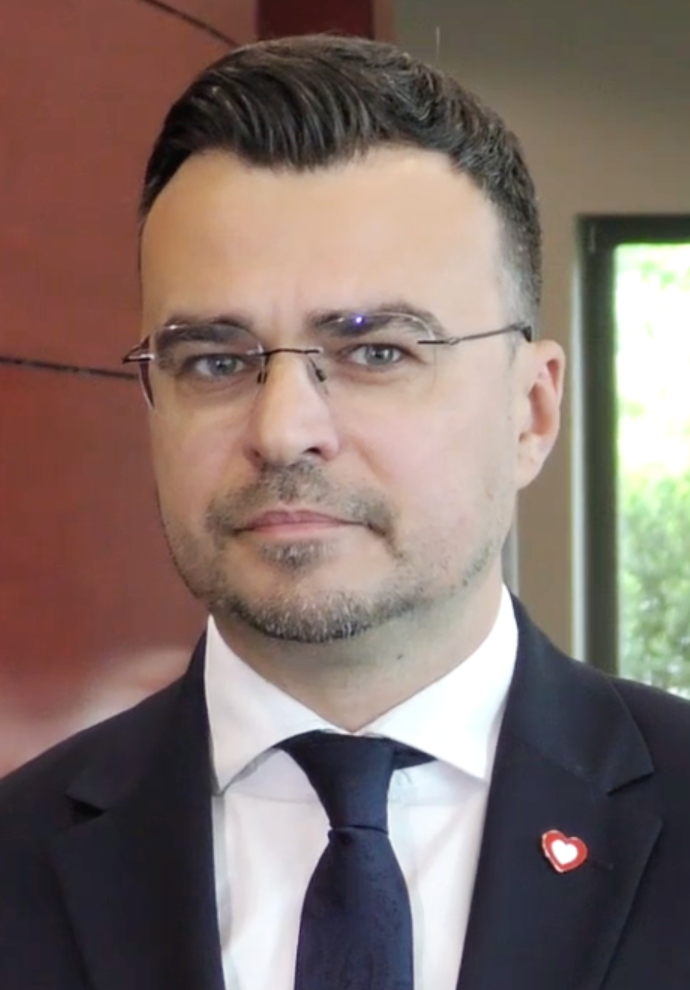
- Wróbel in 2025

Member of the Sejm
- Incumbent
- Assumed office 13 November 2023
- Constituency: Olsztyn

Personal details
- Born: 16 October 1983 (age 42)
- Party: Civic Coalition (since 2025)
- Other political affiliations: Civic Platform (2022–2025)

Maciej Wróbel (born 16 October 1983) is a Polish politician serving as a member of the Sejm since 2023. He has served as deputy minister of culture and national heritage since 2025.
