= 2026 Poland–Ukraine diplomatic crisis =

Bilateral crisis in East-Central Europe

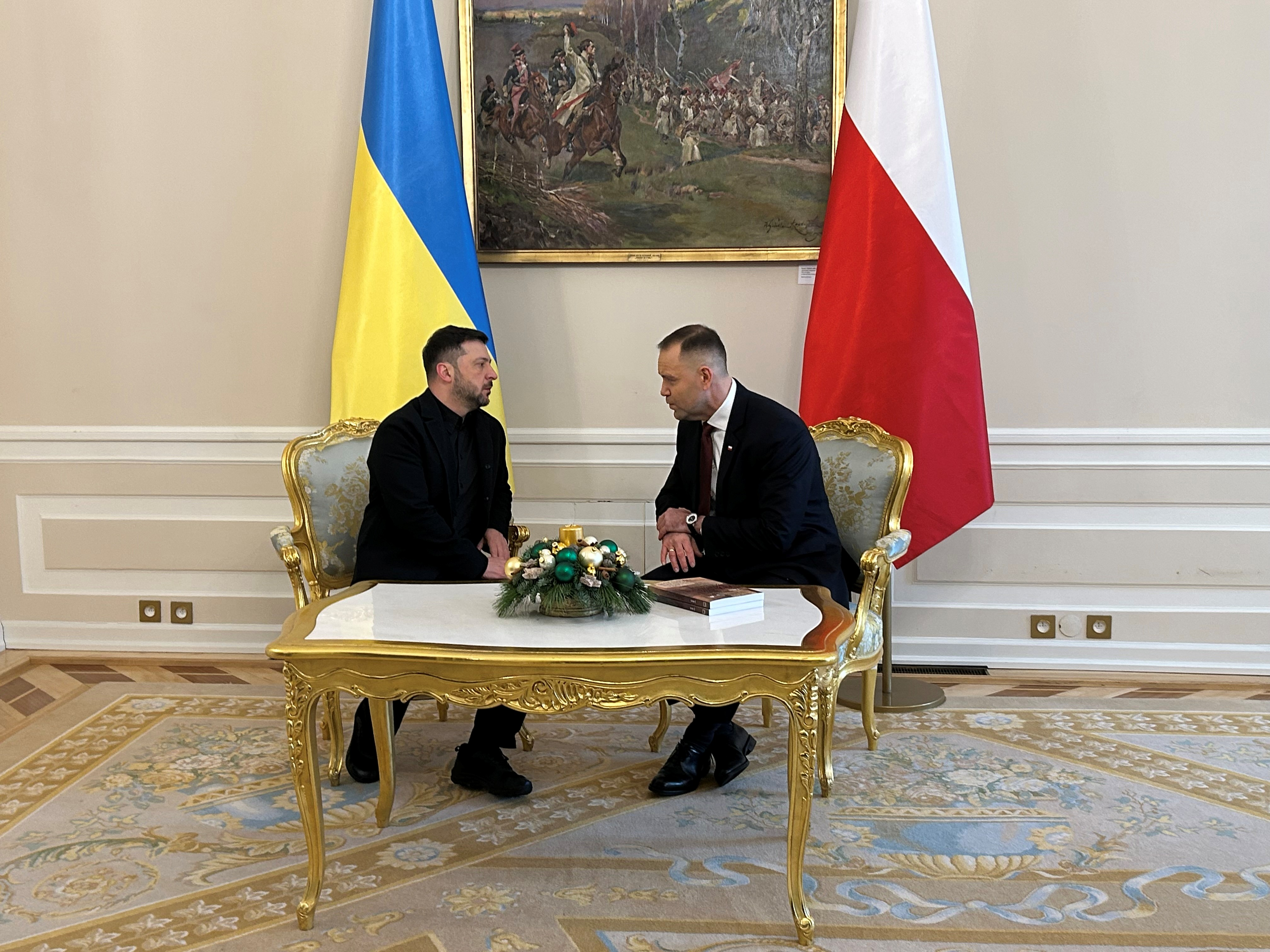
Meeting between Karol Nawrocki and Volodymyr Zelenskyy on 19 December 2025

The 2026 Poland–Ukraine diplomatic crisis began in May 2026 after Ukrainian president Volodymyr Zelenskyy awarded the Ukrainian Special Operations Center North the honorary title "Heroes of the UPA", on that unit's request. This decision sparked outrage in Poland as the UPA was responsible for the massacres of Poles in Volhynia and Eastern Galicia, leading to a major crisis in bilateral relations.

On 19 June 2026, Polish President Karol Nawrocki stripped the Order of the White Eagle from Ukrainian president Volodymyr Zelenskyy. Zelenskyy promptly returned the Order of the White Eagle to the Polish Presidential Chancellery. In solidarity with Zelenskyy, three former Ukrainian presidents Leonid Kuchma, Viktor Yushchenko, and Petro Poroshenko voluntarily renounced and returned their Orders of the White Eagle to Poland. In response, on 25 June 2026, several Polish politicians renounced their Ukrainian orders, notably Jarosław Kaczyński with his Order of Yaroslav the Wise which was the third-highest Ukrainian order when he received it in 2022.

== Crisis ==
=== "Heroes of the UPA" unit naming controversy ===
On 26 May 2026, Zelenskyy awarded the Ukrainian Special Operations Center North the honorary title "Heroes of the UPA" (Note: Special Operations Center North of the Ukrainian Special Operations Forces was awarded the honorary title "Named after Heroes of the UPA" (Ukrainian: "імені Героїв УПА") by a 26 May 2026 decree of Zelenskyy.) stating that it was done in order "to restore the historical traditions of the national army."

The move was met with negative reactions within Poland, because the UPA committed massacres in Volhynia, Eastern Galicia, the Lublin region, and the Subcarpathian region, killing over 100,000 Poles, Jews, or members of other minorities. (Note: Poland officially considers massacres carried out by the UPA as genocide.) Earlier that month, Zelenskyy had also faced similar reactions regarding the reburial with state honours of the remains of Ukrainian nationalist leader Andriy Melnyk, who led the OUN-M faction of the Organisation of Ukrainian Nationalists and collaborated with Nazi Germany. The reburial prompted calls by some Polish political figures for the revocation of Poland's Order of the White Eagle from him.

After Zelenskyy named the unit, former Polish Prime Minister Leszek Miller, a post-communist politician, explicitly called for the decoration to be revoked. He described Zelenskyy's decision as "honoring the butchers who murdered defenseless people simply because they spoke Polish and went to church." The former President of Poland and Nobel Peace Prize Lech Wałęsa laureate announced that "by honoring the UPA bandits, the President of Ukraine has insulted me and all of our compatriots who were murdered." As a result, he removed the Ukrainian flag that he had been wearing on his chest, while emphasizing that he would continue to support the Ukrainian people. Polish President Nawrocki on 29 May 2026 announced that he is considering the revocation of the Order of the White Eagle from Zelenskyy. Nawrocki added that, with his decision, Zelenskyy "provided Russian propaganda with the best material and a great deal of oxygen."

On 1 June, former Polish Ambassador to Ukraine Bartosz Cichocki, who was one of the few foreign diplomats to remain in Kyiv during the first days of the Russian invasion, said that he had returned the Order of Merit he had received from Ukrainian President Volodymyr Zelenskyy in 2022. On 2 June, former Polish President Andrzej Duda commented that Zelenskyy had received the order "under different circumstances," which had since changed, as had the president's conduct. On the same day, Polish Foreign Minister Radosław Sikorski commented that he expected Zelenskyy to "find a way to correct this mistake."

On 5 June, Ukrainian presidential office head Kyrylo Budanov and other officials met Marcin Bosacki, a state secretary at the Polish foreign ministry, to discuss the dispute over the unit name.

=== Revocation of the White Eagle order ===
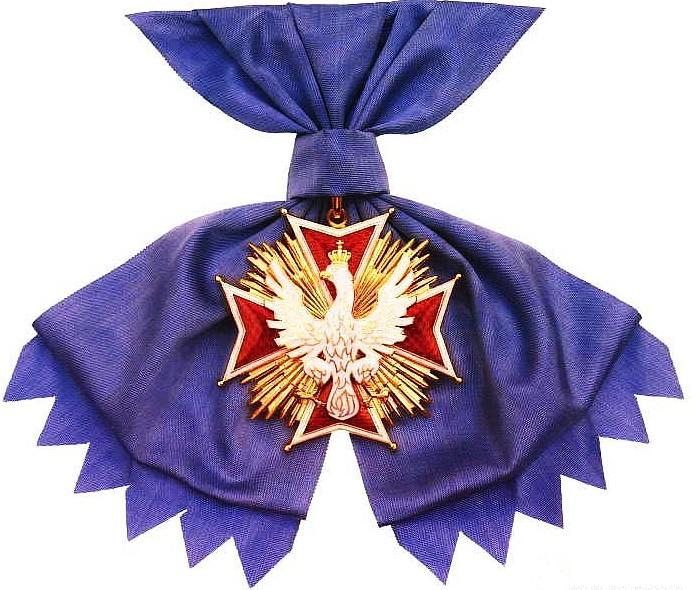
Order of White Eagle

The Chapter of the Order of the White Eagle convened before Nawrocki announced his decision. The award was ultimately revoked by Nawrocki on 19 June. Explaining his decision, Nawrocki said that "For the overwhelming majority of Polish society, the UPA remains, above all, a formation responsible for the brutal crimes committed against citizens of the Republic of Poland during World War Two". Nawrocki said also that "We must not allow the spreading of ideologies responsible for genocide. Just as we reject the symbols of German Nazism and Soviet communism, we must reject the cult of the perpetrators of the Volhynia massacre. There is no place in Polish public life for red–and–black Bandera flags.". Zelenskyy had answered by saying "We believed that the Order of the White Eagle awarded in 2023 was intended primarily for the Ukrainian people and our armed forces."

On 20 June, Zelenskyy sent the Order of the White Eagle back to the Polish Presidential Chancellery through Nova Poshta, and wrote on social media that Ukraine would "remain open to all meaningful formats of engagement with Poland in order to try to avoid conflicting interpretations of the difficult and painful chapters of our shared past" and that "if it is considered that this special symbol [the Polish Order] may remain with Catherine II, Benito Mussolini, and Gerhard Schröder, then we in Ukraine will not argue with that".

On 7 August, the head of Nawrocki's chancellery Zbigniew Bogucki urged Polish prime minister Donald Tusk to "find the courage" to sign the decree revoking Zelenskyy's award, as Tusk's signature is required on the decree, but Zelenskyy had returned the award before that step occurred.

== Reactions ==
On 23 June, six Ukrainian and Polish media outlets published a joint appeal, warning that Poland–Ukraine tensions benefited Russia and saying that historical issues could be addressed after defeating Russia in the war.

=== In Ukraine ===
In solidarity with Zelenskyy, three former Ukrainian presidents Leonid Kuchma, Viktor Yushchenko, and Petro Poroshenko voluntarily renounced and returned their Orders of the White Eagle to Poland on 20 June. As a result of Nawrocki's decision, Kyrylo Budanov, Head of the Office of the President of Ukraine, also voluntarily renounced and returned his Gold Officer's Cross of the Order of Merit of the Republic of Poland to Poland. Budanov criticized Nawrocki's decision of stripping the Order from Zelenskyy as "historically unjust" and "a gift to the Moscow aggressor", and also highlighted that the Order had still not been stripped from "the Italian fascist dictator and Adolf Hitler's accomplice Benito Mussolini". The Order of Merit of the Republic of Poland was also voluntarily renounced and returned to Poland by Andrii Sybiha, Minister of Foreign Affairs of Ukraine, Vasyl Bodnar, Ukraine's Ambassador to Poland, and former Prime Minister Volodymyr Groysman. Speaking about Nawrocki's decision, Sybiha said that "No president of another country is going to dictate our history to us."

In a televised interview with TSN on 22 June, Zelenskyy said that the name had been chosen by the unit itself, and that he never imposed his own names onto units. He said that as president and commander-in-chief, he must provide soldiers with "everything they need to protect our people and our land", and "if they are motivated by their heroes, by heroic names, by historical figures whom they respect, and if this is very important to them, I must do whatever they tell me." He said that Ukraine was protecting Poland and Europe and that Ukrainians were dying. He said Nawrocki was promoting anti-Ukrainian sentiment for internal political reasons, and that Nawrocki had given him a book on the massacres of Poles in Volhynia and Eastern Galicia at their first meeting. He said Ukrainians were grateful for and would always remember Poland's help during the war, but "how do we live? From strike to strike. We do not live from 'thank you' to 'thank you'. And everyone needs to come to terms with that. We are grateful. But we cannot wake up, see the sunrise, and think, 'We mustn't forget to thank everyone today.' People are simply dying. May we, in between expressions of gratitude, also defend all of you? Just in case." He said that Ukraine had not raised other historical issues with Poland, and Poland–Ukraine relations should focus on the shared threat of Russia; he invited Nawrocki to visit Ukraine.

On 17 July, Zelenskyy said he had held a meeting on Poland-Ukraine relations. He announced that all archives of the Security Service of Ukraine and the Foreign Intelligence Service of Ukraine regarding the massacres of Poles in Volhynia and Eastern Galicia would be opened; that "a substantial number" of additional permits for search and exhumation work would be granted; and that Ukraine would expand the capacity of the Ukrainian Institute of National Memory.

=== In Poland ===
Former Polish foreign minister Jacek Czaputowicz called Zelenskyy's naming of the unit a "grave mistake". At the same time, he criticised Nawrocki's decision, saying it had hurt Poland's image. He said Poland had been condescending toward Ukraine and had not treated it as an equal partner for some time, and argued that Polish politicians should not have used the issue politically.

Polish foreign minister Radosław Sikorski noted that Nawrocki's decision was welcomed by Russia. He later said Nawrocki's decision was "inappropriate" because it humiliated Zelenskyy personally, and said he would have recommended a different response, such as renaming an airport after the UPA's victims. At the same time, he said Zelenskyy should have considered Poland's historical sensitivities when approving the name, and should have reflected that the UPA had resisted Soviet occupation but also killed Poles; he said Ukraine could have chosen the name of a specific person who fought Soviet rule instead.

Prime Minister of Poland, Donald Tusk, criticized Zelenskyy's and Nawrocki's moves, saying that "If we quarrel about the past, someone else will win the future [...] the Kremlin will truly have reason to rejoice".

Responding to Zelenskyy's point that the Order of the White Eagle remained with Catherine II, Benito Mussolini, and Gerhard Schröder, undersecretary of state in Nawrocki's office Agnieszka Jędrzak said that the Order of the White Eagle was not revoked posthumously, and although Schröder's pro-Russian actions should be condemned, he had "never insulted the Polish nation as overtly as the Ukrainian president did".

Deputy Marshal of the Senate, Michał Kamiński, returned his Ukrainian orders in protest against President Zelenskyy's decision. He argued that despite the overwhelming military, financial and humanitarian support given to Ukraine by Poland, the Ukrainian authorities were unable to unequivocally condemn the crimes perpetrated by UPA on Polish civilians. He also criticized the continued administrative and political problems regarding the exhumation of the Polish victims of UPA in Volhynia and compared it to the process of the exhumation of Wehrmacht soldiers, which was conducted without such obstacles. Former Prime Minister, Jarosław Kaczyński, also announced he would be returning his Order of Prince Yaroslav the Wise as an "expression of his attitude towards the Ukrainian elites and an act of loyalty with President Nawrocki". Similar moves were announced by Mariusz Błaszczak, Zbigniew Rau, Marek Kuchciński, and Adam Bielan.

Former Polish Prime Minister and a left-wing politician, Leszek Miller, branded Zelenskyy's decision as "spitting in the face of Poles" while presidential advisor, Marcin Przydacz, suggested Ukraine would not enter the European Union "with Bandera legacy". A similar statement was made by Minister of National Defence, Władysław Kosiniak-Kamysz. A Polish MEP Ewa Zajączkowska-Hernik (Patriots for Europe) took part in the debate in European Parliament over "2025 Commission report on Ukraine" saying that "There is no moral difference between honoring the SS and honoring the UPA. It is the same cult of force, the same ethnic hatred... Ukraine's march toward Europe with genocidal figures on its banners is a disgrace. As Poles, we should never agree to Ukraine's accession to Europe. Down with Banderite Nazism!" Then, she publicly tore up the red–and–black UPA flag on the podium.

Former Polish lawmaker Piotr Fogler returned his Golden Cross of Merit in protest of Nawrocki's decision, calling the revocation "the foolish decision to take the order away from the President of Ukraine, a Ukraine that is fighting", and accusing Nawrocki of "making a mockery of Poland and all of us".

A group of Polish activists and public figures launched a campaign to give Zelenskyy a new award of their own, the Civic Order of the Future. More than 21,000 Poles signed the petition for the new grassroots award, which was presented on 12 November 2026 at the Ukrainian embassy in Warsaw. Ukrainian deputy prime minister Vsevolod Chentsov received the award on behalf of Zelenskyy and the Ukrainian people, in order to give it to Zelenskyy later.

=== In other countries ===
Czech coalition party Freedom and Direct Democracy want Zelenskyy to be stripped of the highest Czech state honour, the Order of the White Lion. However, Czech President Petr Pavel has rejected such proposal because "neither the Constitution nor the law grants the president of the Czech Republic the authority to decide on the revocation of state honours".

On 8 July 2026, the European Parliament, in a part of its resolution about Ukraine's EU accession, criticised Zelenskyy for the military unit naming controversy, describing it as an “unnecessary and unprovoked escalation” by the Ukrainian president which “undermines neighbourly relations” and “is not in line with European values,” and that it disregarded Polish sensitivies and grief on behalf of the survivors.

== Commentary ==
Historian Timothy Snyder said in an interview with Newsweek Polska that when Ukrainians discussed the UPA, they mainly focused on its anti-Soviet resistance after 1945, in the third stage of its history; on the other hand, Poles mainly remembered the UPA's killing of Poles in 1943 in the first stage of its history. Snyder said Poland often failed to acknowledge its own historical crimes against Ukrainians, and that "the war of memory is much more comfortable for Polish politicians than the real war". He said Ukraine had made a mistake and that in his opinion, the Russo-Ukrainian war should not be linked to World War II and the UPA; he said that Zelenskyy's naming of the unit could not be judged outside the context of the war, which "produces emotions that are difficult for the West to understand". Wojciech Konończuk, director of Warsaw's Centre for Eastern Studies, also told BBC that Ukrainians focused on the UPA's anti-Soviet resistance which continued for many years after World War II, and "don't know, or don't want to know" its activities before that, while Poles saw the UPA as a "criminal structure" responsible for massacres of Poles, and usually did not know about the UPA's fight against Soviet occupation after 1945.

== See also ==
- Historiography of the massacres of Poles in Volhynia and Eastern Galicia
- Amendment to the Act on the Institute of National Remembrance, Poland, 2018
- Poland-Ukraine relations
