= Marcin Kuchciński =

Polish government official (born 1976)

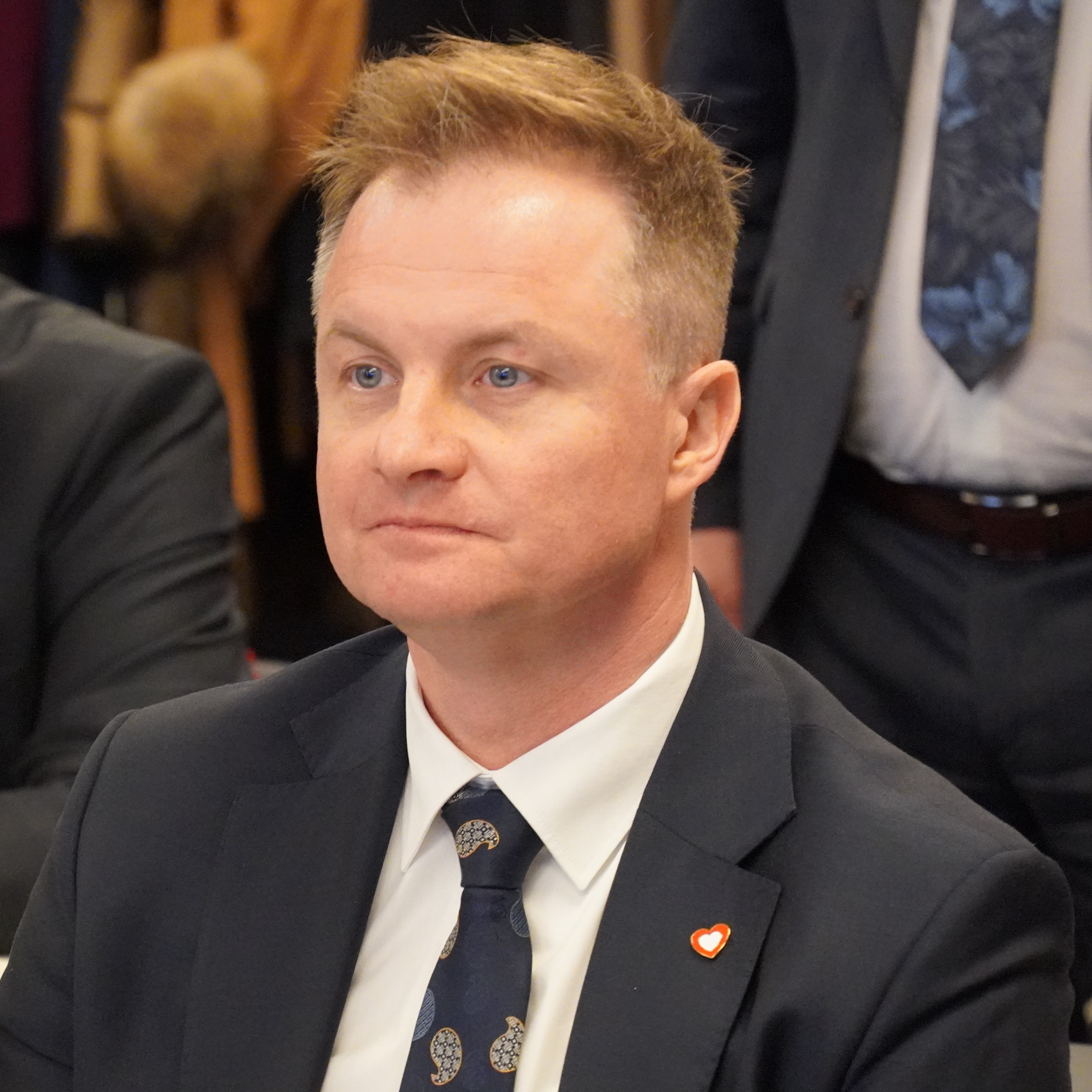
- Kuchciński in 2024

Marshal of Warmian–Masurian Voivodeship
- Incumbent
- Assumed office 7 November 2023
- Preceded by: Gustaw Marek Brzezin

Personal details
- Born: 31 December 1976 (age 49) Olsztyn, Polish People's Republic
- Citizenship: Poland
- Party: Civic Platform
- Education: University of Warmia and Mazury in Olsztyn
- Occupation: Politician

Marcin Andrzej Kuchciński (born December 31, 1976, in Olsztyn) is a Polish local government official, manager and volleyball player, since 2015 member of the Voivodeship executive board of the Warmian-Masurian Voivodeship, in the years 2018–2023 and served as vice-marshal, and from 2023 Marshal of the Warmian-Masurian Voivodeship.

== Biography ==
Son of Andrzej and Emilia. He was raised in Olsztyn, where he graduated from Primary School No. 2 and the 4th Maria Skłodowska-Curie General Secondary School. In 2000, he graduated from the University of Warmia and Mazury with a degree in environmental protection and inland fishing. He played in the AZS Olsztyn volleyball club. He worked for a dozen or so years in private companies. He was the director of the Investor Acquisition Department in the Warmia-Masuria Special Economic Zone and vice-president of the management board for investment implementation in the joint-stock company Metromex. He also sat on the supervisory board of the TBS Administrator company, and in 2018 also on the Investment Council of the Warmia-Masuria Province.

He became involved in political activity within the Civic Platform, in 2016 he took over the leadership of its Olsztyn structures. In 2007 (after the resignation of another councilor), 2010 and 2014 he was a member of the Olsztyn city council on its behalf; he headed the Sports and Recreation Committee. In October 2015, the voivode began the procedure of terminating his mandate after it was revealed that – contrary to the information provided in the statement – he did not live in the city, but in Kieźliny (and after the council itself refused to dismiss him). On November 2, 2015, he was elected to the executive board of the Warmian-Masurian Voivodeship of the 5th term. In 2018, he obtained the mandate of a councilor of the Warmian-Masurian Regional Assembly of the 6th term. On December 4, 2018, he was elected vice-marshal of the voivodeship, responsible for, among other things, infrastructure, geodesy, health care, public procurement, administration and office service, and voivodeship roads. In 2019, he unsuccessfully ran from the last place on the Civic Coalition list in the elections to the Sejm in the Olsztyn district. On November 7, 2023, the Warmian–Masurian Voivodeship Sejmik elected him to the office of the voivodeship marshal; he replaced Gustaw Marek Brzezin in this function.

In 2024, he was elected as a member of the Warmian–Masurian Voivodeship Sejmik for the 7th term. On May 14 of the same year, the councilors again entrusted him with the functions of the marshal.
