= Sejm Constituency no. 35 =

Polish parliamentary constituency

Olsztyn
- Polish: Okręg wyborczy Olsztyn
- Constituency for the National Assembly of the Republic of Poland
- Boundary of the Olsztyn Constituency in Poland for the 2011 general election.
- Counties in Warmian-Masurian Voivodeship: Ełk, Giżycko, Gołdap, Kętrzyn, Mrągowo, Nidzica, Olecko, Olsztyn, Pisz, Szczytno, and Węgorzewo
- City Counties in Warmian-Masurian Voivodeship: Olsztyn

Current constituency
- Sejm Deputies: 10
- Sejm District: 35
- European Parliament constituency: Podlaskie and Warmian-Masurian
- Voivodeship sejmik: Warmian-Masurian Regional Assembly

Olsztyn is a Polish parliamentary constituency in the Warmian-Masurian Voivodeship. It elects ten members of the Sejm.

The district has the number '35' for elections to the Sejm and is named after the city of Olsztyn. It includes the counties of Ełk, Giżycko, Gołdap, Kętrzyn, Mrągowo, Nidzica, Olecko, Olsztyn, Pisz, Szczytno, and Węgorzewo and the city county of Olsztyn.

== List of members ==
=== Sejm ===
Member	Party
Iwona Arent	Law and Justice
Artur Chojecki	Law and Justice
Janusz Cichoń	Civic Platform
Janusz Cieszyński	Law and Justice
Olga Semeniuk-Patkowska	Law and Justice
Maciej Wróbel	Civic Coalition
Marcin Kulasek	New Left
Paweł Papke	Civic Platform
Anna Wojciechowska	Civic Platform
Urszula Pasławska	Polish People's Party
