= Olga Semeniuk-Patkowska =

Polish politician (born 1988)

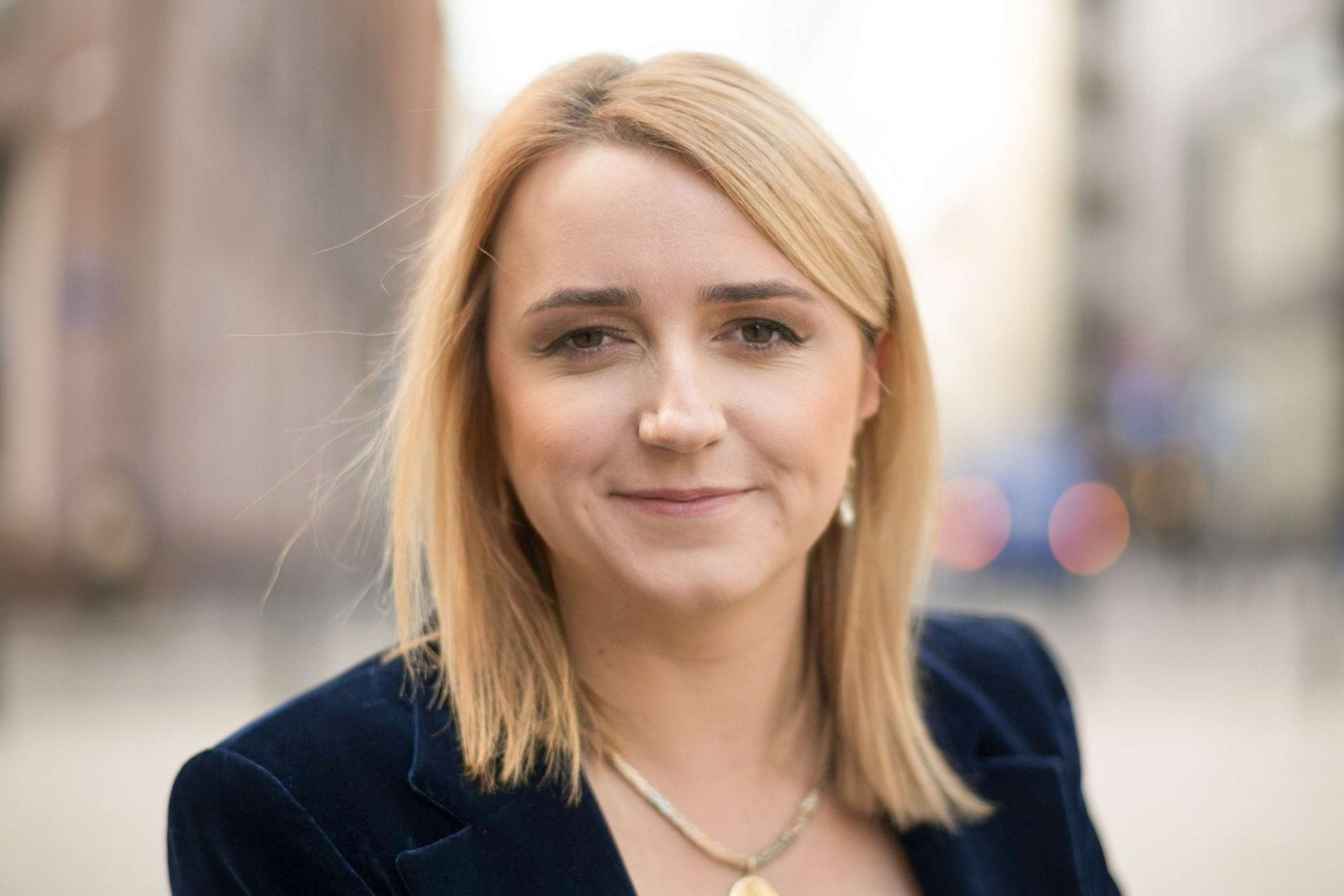
- Semeniuk-Patkowska in 2023

Member of the Sejm
- Incumbent
- Assumed office 13 November 2023
- Constituency: Olsztyn

Personal details
- Born: 5 December 1988 (age 37)
- Party: Law and Justice

Olga Semeniuk-Patkowska (born 5 December 1988) is a Polish politician serving as a member of the Sejm since 2023. From 2018 to 2023, she was a member of the Warsaw City Council.
