= Marta Fogler =

Marta Halina Fogler

Member of the Sejm
- In office 2001–2005

Personal details
- Born: 19 May 1959 (age 67) Warsaw, Poland
- Education: University of Warsaw

Marta Fogler (born 19 May 1959 in Warsaw) is a Polish politician who served as a member of the Sejm.

== Biography ==
Marta Halina Fogler was born on 19 May 1959 in Warsaw. She graduated from university in 1987 at the Philology department of the University of Warsaw. In 1980–1981, she led the Independent Students' Association at her department. In 1994–2001, she was a member of the Warsaw City Council, she also chaired the Polish section of the European Union of Women. In her political career, she belonged to several centrist parties: the Democratic Union, Freedom Union, Conservative People's Party and Civic Platform. In 1997, she unsuccessfully ran for the Sejm on the electoral list of the Freedom Union. In 2001, she was elected to the Sejm on the list of the Civic Platform in the Warsaw electoral district. She represented the Sejm at the Convention on the Future of Europe. In 2003, she was temporarily removed from the Civic Platform parliamentary club, although she was restored when the allegations against her were dismissed. She did not run for reelection in 2005. In 2006, she was the leader of the Self-Governing Mazowsze list to the Masovian Voivodeship Sejmik, but the list was invalidated before election day. She remained a member of the Civic Platform, in 2019 again running unsuccessfully for a seat in the Sejm on the list of the Civic Coalition in Nowy Sącz electoral district.

She is the daughter of engineer and politician Stanisław Tuszewski and the wife of Piotr Fogler, a former Sejm member. Before marriage, her surname was Mordasewicz-Zubrzycka.

== Bibliography ==
- "Strona sejmowa posła IV kadencji".
