= Jacek Protas =

Polish politician (born 1964)

Jacek Protas MEP
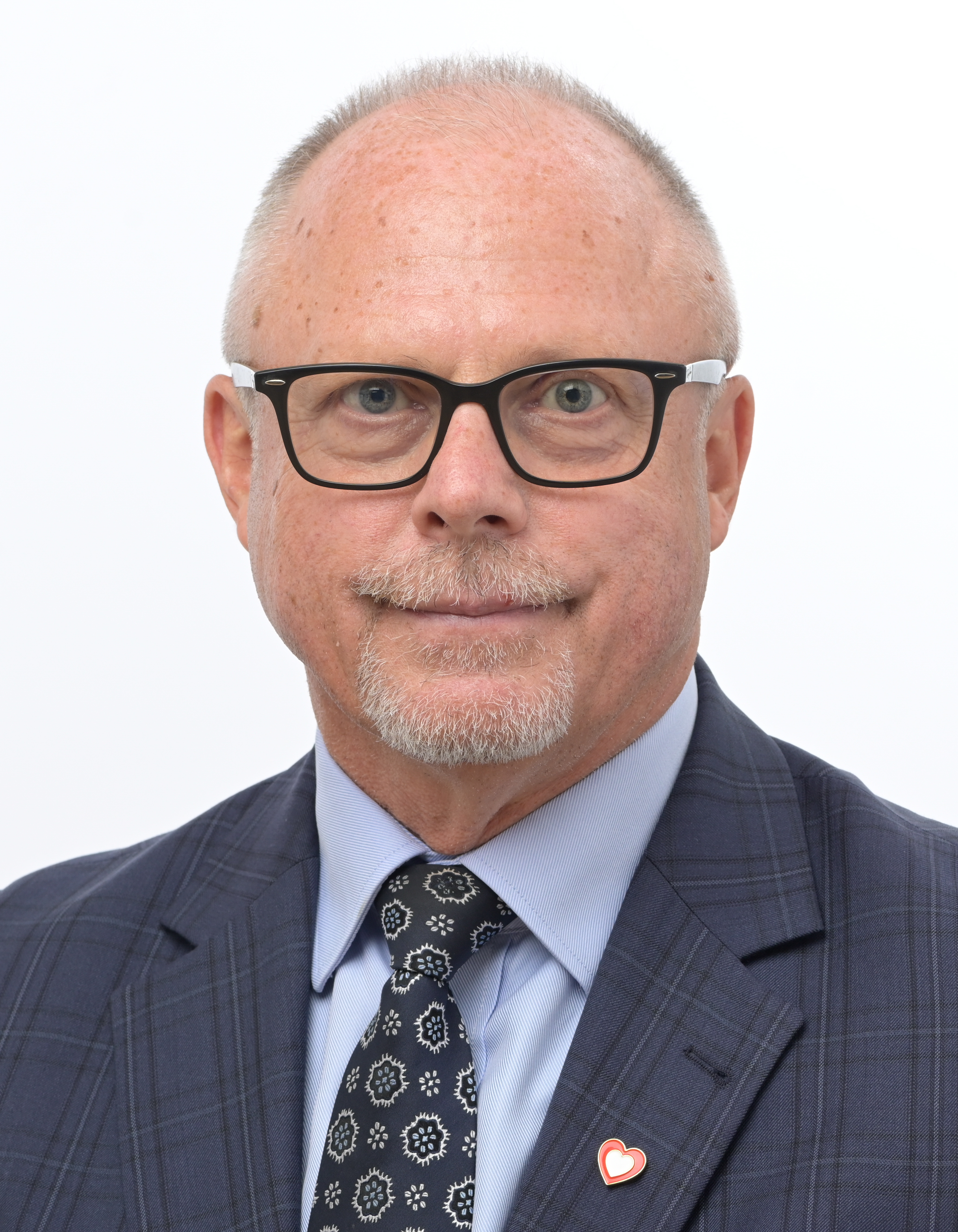
- Protas in 2024

Member of the European Parliament for Podlaskie and Warmian–Masurian
- Incumbent
- Assumed office 16 July 2024

Marshal of Warmian–Masurian Voivodeship
- In office 29 November 2006 – 12 December 2014
- Preceded by: Andrzej Ryński
- Succeeded by: Gustaw Marek Brzezin

Personal details
- Born: 15 January 1964 (age 62)
- Party: Civic Platform
- Other political affiliations: European People's Party

Jacek Protas (born 15 January 1964) is a Polish politician of the Civic Platform who was elected member of the European Parliament in 2024. He served as marshal of Warmian–Masurian Voivodeship from 2006 to 2014, and as a member of the Sejm from 2015 to 2024.
