= Gustaw Marek Brzezin =

Polish politician

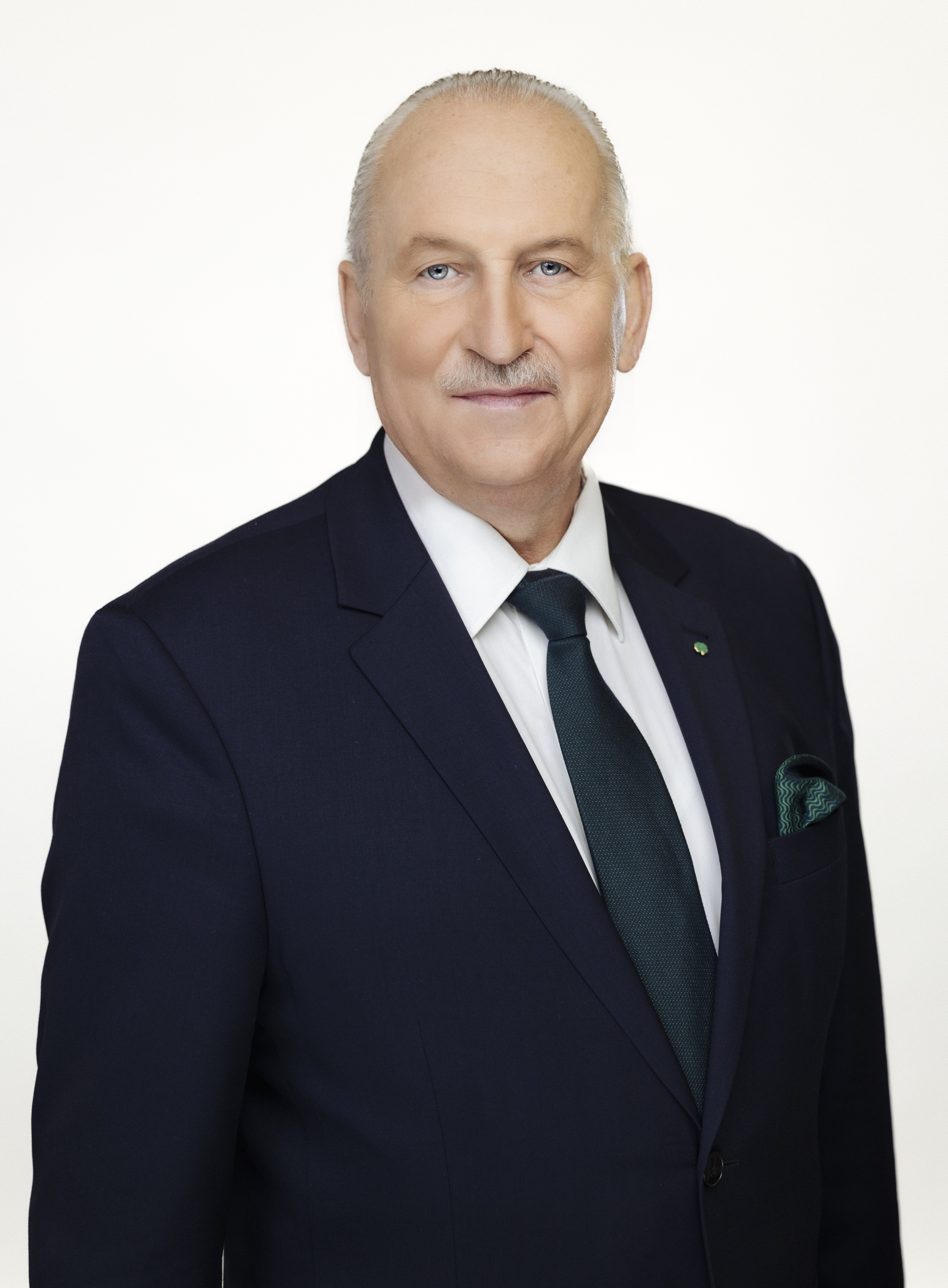

Marshal of Warmian–Masurian Voivodeship
- In office 12 December 2014 – 7 November 2023
- Preceded by: Jacek Protas
- Succeeded by: Marcin Kuchciński

Personal details
- Born: 13 July 1958 (age 67) Ostróda, Poland
- Citizenship: Poland
- Party: Polskie Stronnictwo Ludowe

Gustaw Marek Brzezin (born 13 July 1958) is an agronomist and Polish Peasants' Party politician. He is the Voivodeship marshal of Warmia-Masuria.

== Biography ==
He graduated from Agricultural and Technical Academy in Olsztyn, now the University of Warmia and Mazury in Olsztyn. He completed post-graduate studies in the field of crop production in Warsaw University of Life Sciences in Warsaw and administration and management for University of Warmia and Mazury in Olsztyn. In 2011, he obtained the academic degree doctor of agricultural sciences on the basis of the dissertation 'Role of undersown crops in alleviating the effects of simplifying crop rotation with spring barley'. In 1984 he started to work as a teacher of vocational subjects at the Agricultural School Complex in Ostróda. In 1999 he became the chairman of the Association of Municipalities of the Ostróda-Iławski Region "Czyste Środowisko".

He joined the Polish Peasants' Party. In October 2016 he became the president of the regional structures of this party.

In 1998 he became commune administrator of Ostróda. He maintained his position in the first direct elections in 2002, obtaining 4004 votes (81.85%). He won reelection in 2006 and in 2010, receiving 2698 votes (53.01%) and 3632 votes (60.61%) respectively. He resigned from his position in 2012 in connection with his election to the voivodship's deputy voivodeship Warmian-Masurian Voivodship,

In the 2014 he was elected to the Warmian-Masurian regional council of the 5th term. On 12 December he was appointed a marshal in the new province board, replacing Jacek Protas in this position. In 2018 he retained the mandate of the provincial council for another term. On 4 December 2018 he became the voivodship marshal for the second time.

Translated in part from the corresponding article in the Polish Wikipedia.
