= Maciej Rayzacher =

Polish actor and writer

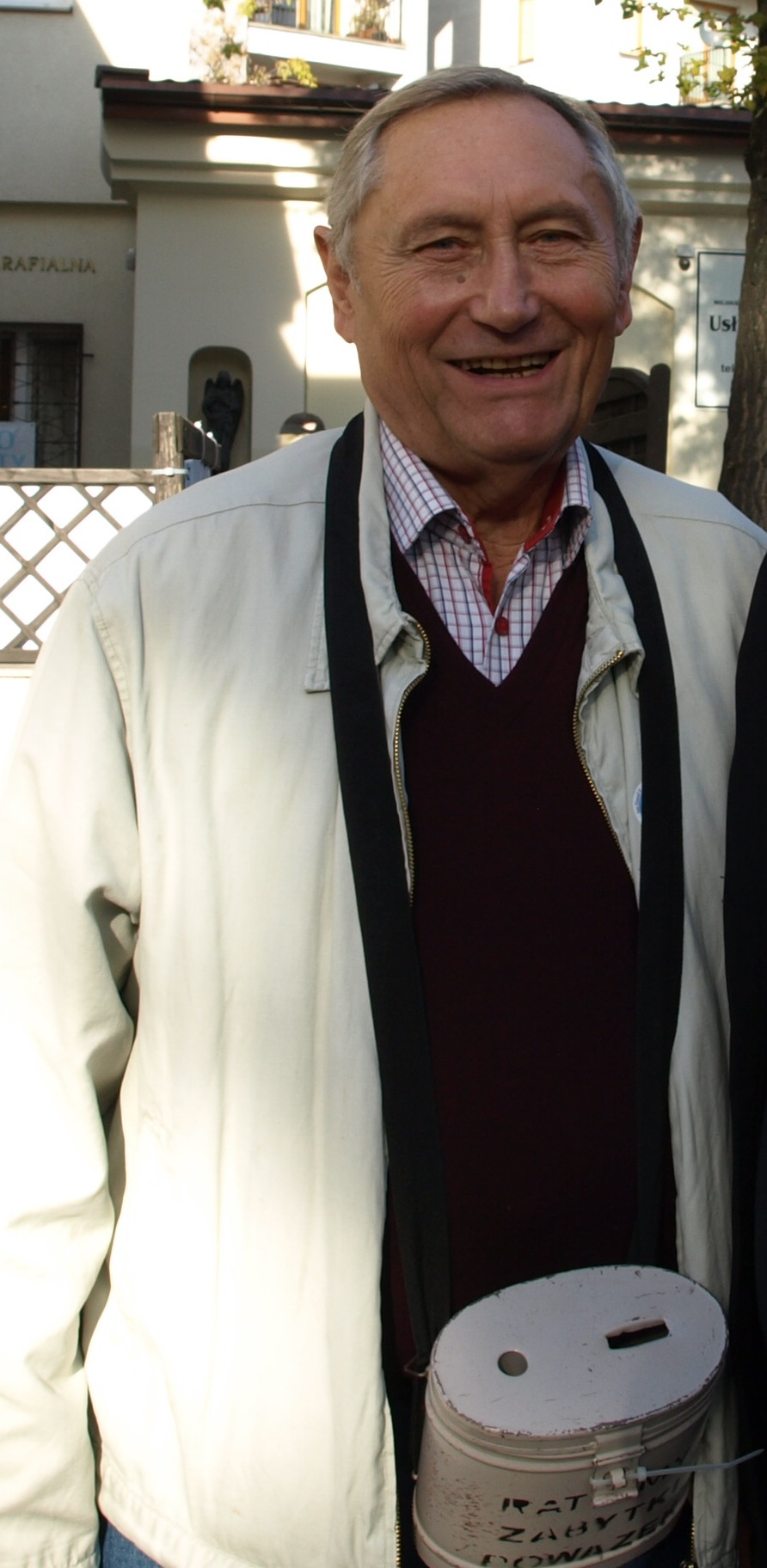
- Born: 10 January 1940 (age 86); Warsaw, Poland
- Occupation: Actor
- Years active: 1959 – present
- Honours: Order of Polonia Restituta, Medal for Merit to Culture – Gloria Artis

Maciej Stanisław Rayzacher (born 10 January 1940 in Warsaw) is a Polish theatre and film actor, writer, voiceover provider, councillor and an activist of the democratic opposition during the times of the communist Polish People's Republic.

== Biography ==
In 1962 he graduated from the Acting Department of the National Film School in Łódź. He made his debut as Dziunio in Lunatycy, and a year later he made his first appearance in Theatre. He was an actor at the Ziemi Mazowieckiej Theatre between 1962 and 1965, then he worked in Warsaw at the Classic Theatre until 1971, the Student Satirical Theatre (until 1973) and Powszechny Theatre (until 1980) .

Since 1976 he engaged with the Workers Defence Committee and then the Committee for Social Self-Defence "KOR". He co-created and published the newspaper "Wolna Taśma". He was a member of the local Committee for the Self-Defense of Peasants (pol. Komitecie Samoobrony Chłopskiej). As a consequence of his involvement in the opposition to the communist regime, from 1980 onwards his career was largely limited, so much so that until 1989 (the end of communism in Poland) he mainly appeared in churches. After the introduction of martial law he was forced to remain in a designed place between 13 December 1981 and 20 March 1982. After being released, he organised help for those who were repressed by the government and their families, he took part in so called Masses for the Homeland. Nearing the end of the 80s he worked at the Polish Blind Association as an instructor and then as an instructor at the "Polish Community" Association.

Between 1990 and 1998 he was a councilor in the District of Ochota. He held various positions in local government (including deputy mayor and departmental director), as well as an advisor to the governor of the province. From 1998 to 2002 he was a councilor of Warsaw on behalf of AWS-SKL. In 2006, he retired from his post.

In 2006, the President of Poland awarded Rayzacher the Polish Officer's Cross of the Order of Polonia Restituta to celebrate the 30th anniversary of the Workers' Defense Committee. In 2007 he was also awarded the Medal for Merit to Culture – Gloria Artis.

He supported and was a part of Bronisław Komorowski's campaign team for the Polish presidential elections in 2010 and 2015.

== Bibliography ==
- Biographical note in the Encyclopedia of Solidarity (pol.)
- Maciej Rayzacher on filmpolski.pl (pol.)
