= Voluntary Labour Corps (Poland) =

Voluntary Labour Corps Ochotnicze Hufce Pracy
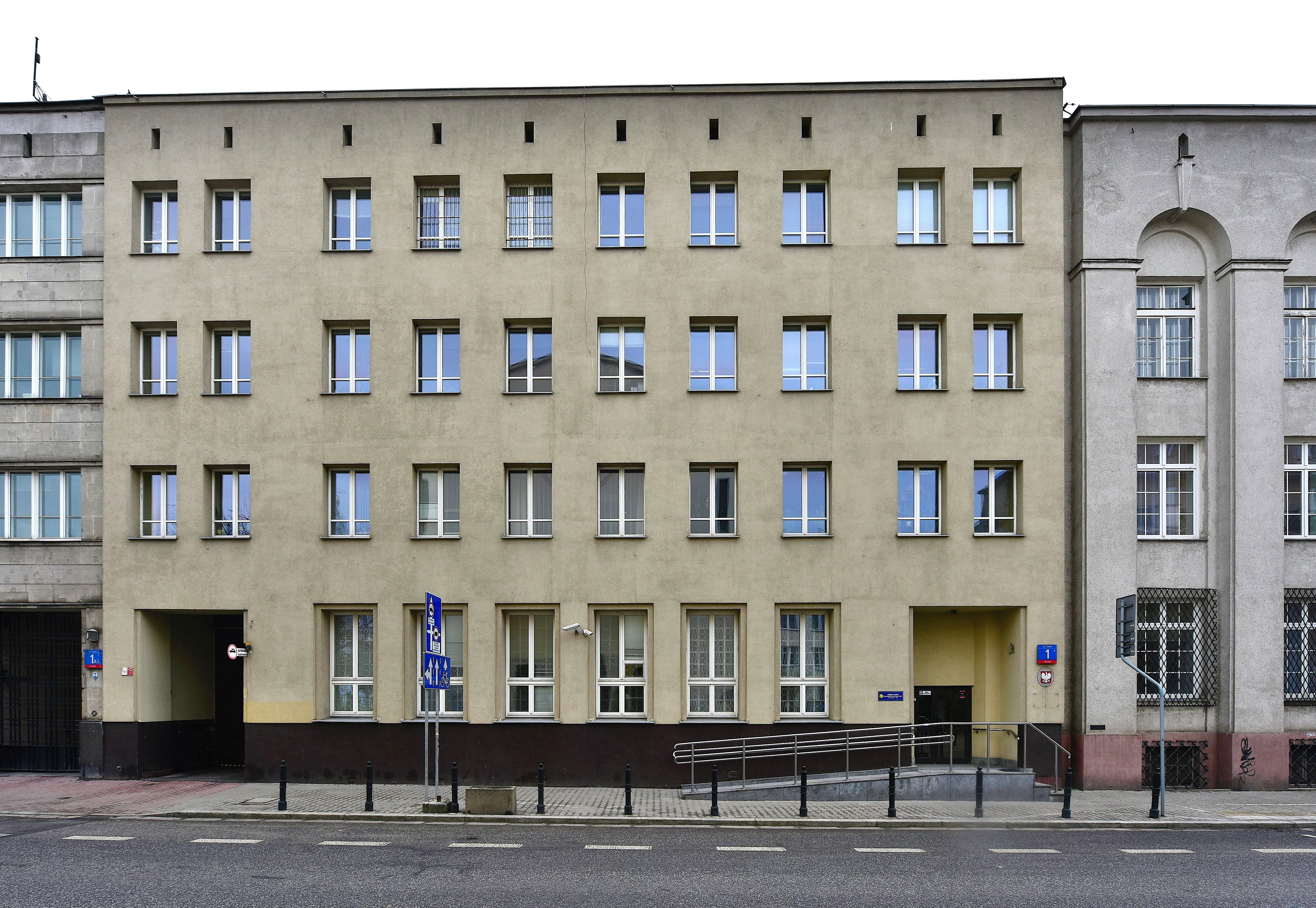
- Founded: 13 June 1958
- Headquarters: Warsaw

Voluntary Labour Corps (Polish: Ochotnicze Hufce Pracy) (OHP) is a nationwide hierarchical service operating as a state budget unit subordinate to the minister responsible for labor, performing state tasks in the field of employment and counteracting marginalization and social exclusion of youth, as well as tasks in the field of their education and upbringing. The organization is headquartered in Warsaw and has regional offices in the different Voivodeships of Poland.

== History ==
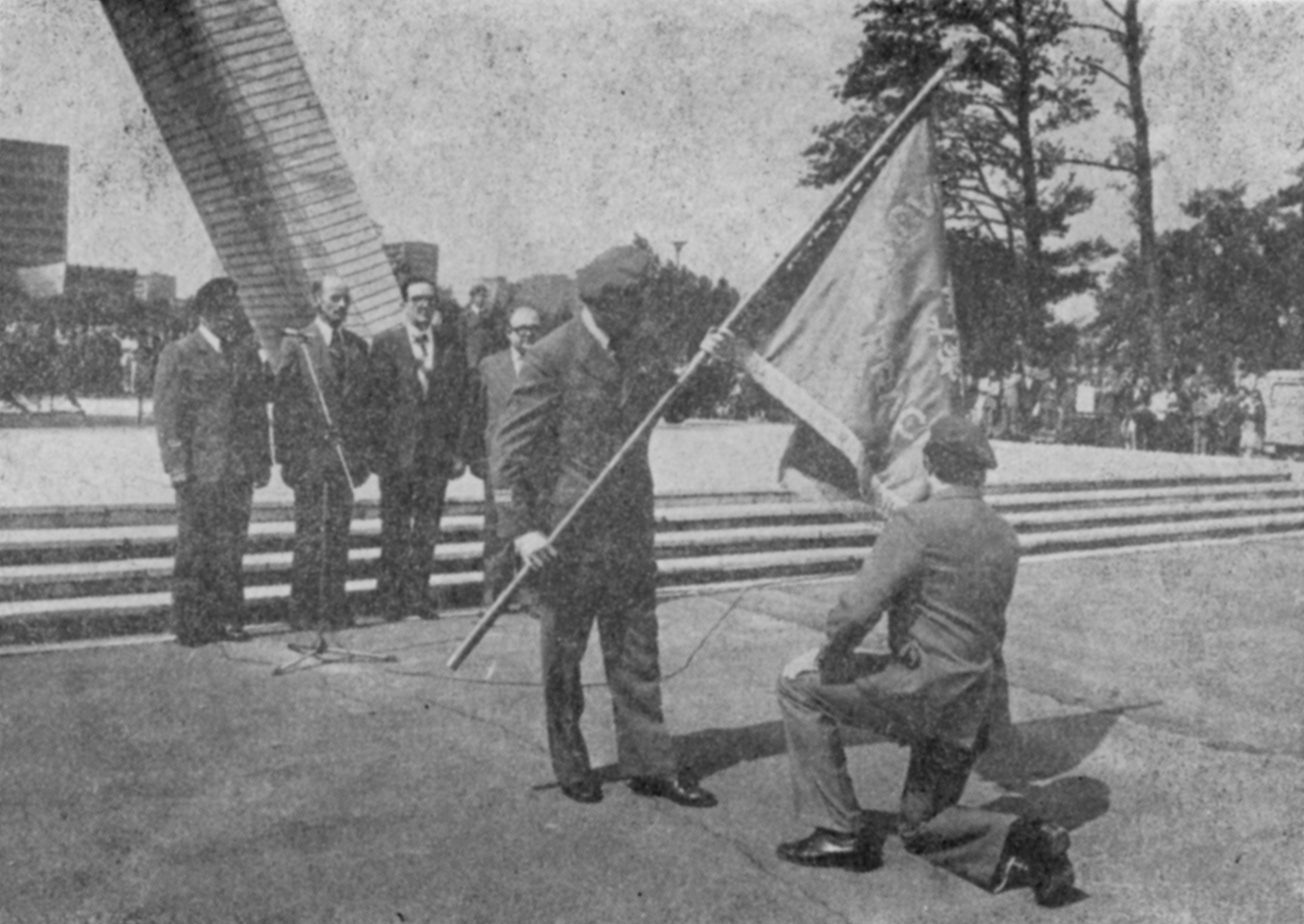
Oath ceremony of the Voluntary Labour Corps in 1958

The service was established on June 13, 1958 by resolution of the Council of Ministers No. 201/58 as a successor to the General Organization "Service to Poland" (SP), dissolved in 1955. In its assumptions, the OHP referred to the pre-war tradition of the Junackie Labor Corps (JHP) operating in the years 1936–1939. The purpose of the corps was to provide young people of both sexes with work while enabling them to acquire professional qualifications in combination with providing them with general education and civic education.

The recruitment of the first Junaks (participants in the units) took place between June 20 and November 30, 1958. Four units were organized in the Bieszczady Mountains, with a total of 1,200 Junaks, who were sent to work on the construction of the Rzepedź–Moczarne narrow-gauge railway, and one stationary unit in Silesia, sent to work at the Oświęcim Chemical Plant. Another unit worked at the Turów Mine and Power Plant, which was being expanded at the time.

From the beginning of the units' existence until the fall of the communist system in Poland in 1989, militarized structures and the Civil Defense played a significant role in this organization. After 1989, these structures, along with professional soldiers, were withdrawn from the units.

The organizational changes in the OHP were carried out based on the relevant acts – of September 7, 1991 on the education system and of October 16, 1991 on employment and unemployment – and the regulation of the Council of Ministers of September 8, 1992 on the principles of the functioning of the corps issued on their basis. Further regulations were introduced on May 23, 1995 and July 11, 2000.

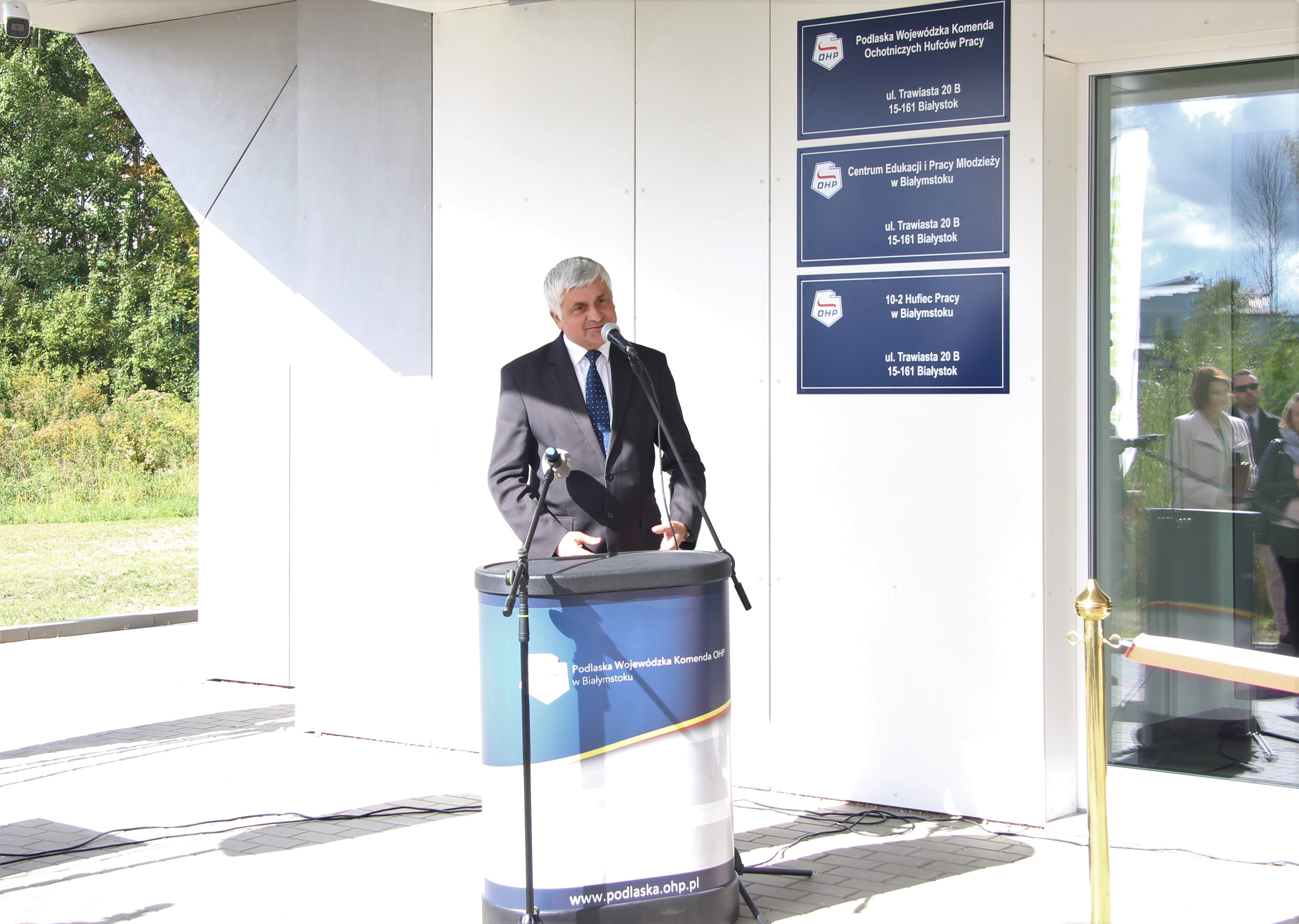
Voivode of Podlaskie Voivodeship giving a speech in a ceremony in the regional headquarters in Białystok.

In 1991, on the initiative of the Polish Episcopate, the Department of the Labor Corps was established within the organization, associating Catholic children and youth. The first national pastor of the organization in the years 1991–1994 was Fr. Antoni Długosz, later the auxiliary bishop of Częstochowa. The task of the national pastoral ministry of the OHP was, among others, coordinating regional pastoral care and organizing an annual pilgrimage to Jasna Góra. As of February 1, 2024, by decision of the OHP commander, Jerzy Budzyn, all chaplains working at the organization, which officially ended cooperation with the church, were dismissed.

Currently, the legal basis for the operation of the OHP is the Act of 20 April 2004 on the promotion of employment and labour market institutions, initially together with the regulation issued thereto of 30 December 2004, currently replaced by the regulation of 22 July 2011.
