= Paweł Piskorski =

Polish politician (born 1968)

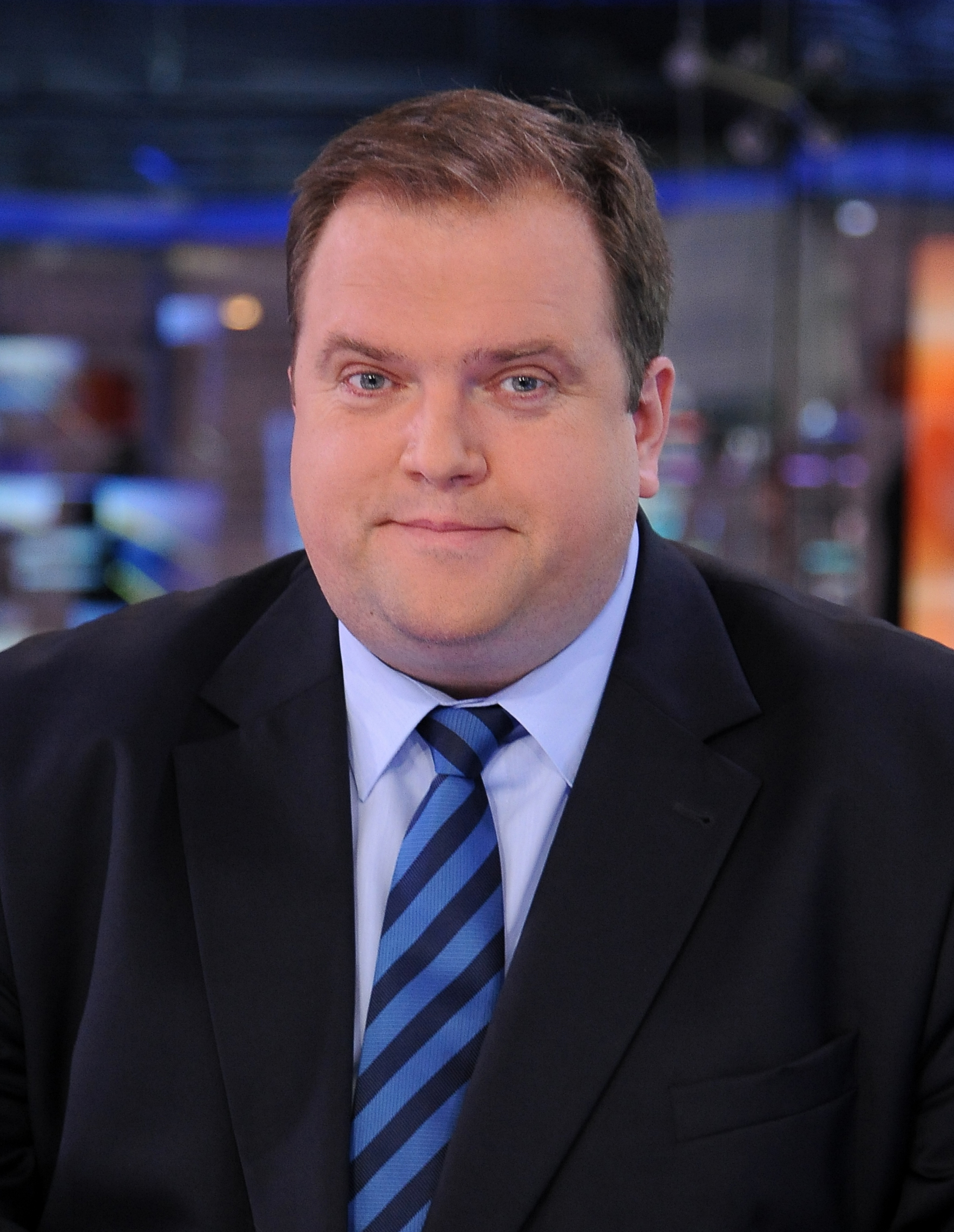
- Piskorski in 2014

43rd Mayor of Warsaw
- In office 30 March 1999 – 14 January 2002
- Preceded by: Marcin Święcicki
- Succeeded by: Wojciech Kozak

Member of the European Parliament for Poland
- In office June 2004 – June 2009

Personal details
- Born: 25 February 1968 (age 58) Warsaw, People's Republic of Poland
- Party: Democratic Party; Civic Platform; Freedom Union
- Other political affiliations: ALDE
- Spouse: Aleksandra Piskorska
- Profession: Historian

Paweł Bartłomiej Piskorski (born 25 February 1968 in Warsaw) is a former Polish politician.

He was Mayor of Warsaw from 30 March 1999 to 14 January 2002. In 1997 he was elected to the Sejm from the Freedom Union electoral list, and in 2001, after participating in a secession from that party, he successfully ran under the Civic Platform banner. In 2004 he was the Secretary General of Civic Platform. He has been elected Member of the European Parliament in 2004. On 26 April 2006 he was excluded from the Civic Platform. Since February 2009 he has been the chairman of the Democratic Party.

== Alleged corruption ==
In April 2006 Polish newspaper "Dziennik" informed about the purchase in 2005 by Paweł Piskorski and his wife of more than 320 hectares of land for afforestation. The total cost of the purchase amounted to 1.25 million zł. According to the newspaper’s journalist, this amount exceeded the value of assets declared by the MEP in a financial statement for that year. Paweł Piskorski explained that the money came from sale of property, credit, savings and current income by him and his wife. That declaration was not officially challenged by any public authority. Nevertheless, Piskorski's reputation has been irrecoverably damaged. The day after the publication the national board of the Civic Platform (Platforma Obywatelska) decided to exclude him from the party, which was followed on 17 May by the removal of his ten collaborators, among others, Piotr Fogler. The official reason stated was damage to Civic Platform’s image.

In January 2009 Paweł Piskorski joined the Democratic Party (Stronnictwo Demokratyczne), thus becoming the only MEP of the party, as well as declaring his intention to run for the position of chairman. This position was obtained at an extraordinary Democratic Party congress, held on 21 February that year. However, his nomination was followed by the publication of his statements given to the National Revenue Service agency to explain sources of his income. He tried to explain that he earned money by persistent winnings at the casino and by art trading. Public opinion took these clarifications with disbelief, which torpedoed the election campaign of the Democratic Party.

In January 2010, a public prosecutor charged him with the use of a forged document (contract with an antique dealer) in tax proceedings. Paweł Piskorski pleaded not guilty to committing this act.

Piskorski is listed in the Panama Papers as a beneficiary or shareholder in an offshore company.
