= Warmian–Masurian Voivodeship Sejmik =

Legislature of Warmian-Masurian, Poland

Sejmik Województwa Warmińsko-Mazurskiego

Type
- Type: Unicameral
- Houses: Regional Assembly (sejmik wojewódzki)

Leadership
- Chairperson: Bogdan Bartnicki, PSL
- Vice-Chairpersons: Zbigniew Homza, Marek Chyl, Rafał Wilczek
- Marshal: Marcin Kuchciński, KO

Structure
- Seats: 30 councillors
- Political groups: Executive board (19): KO (13); PO (8); .N (2); Independent (3); PSL (4); P2050 (1); Independent (1); Opposition (11): PiS (11); PiS (9); Independent (2)

Elections
- Last election: 7 April 2024

Meeting place
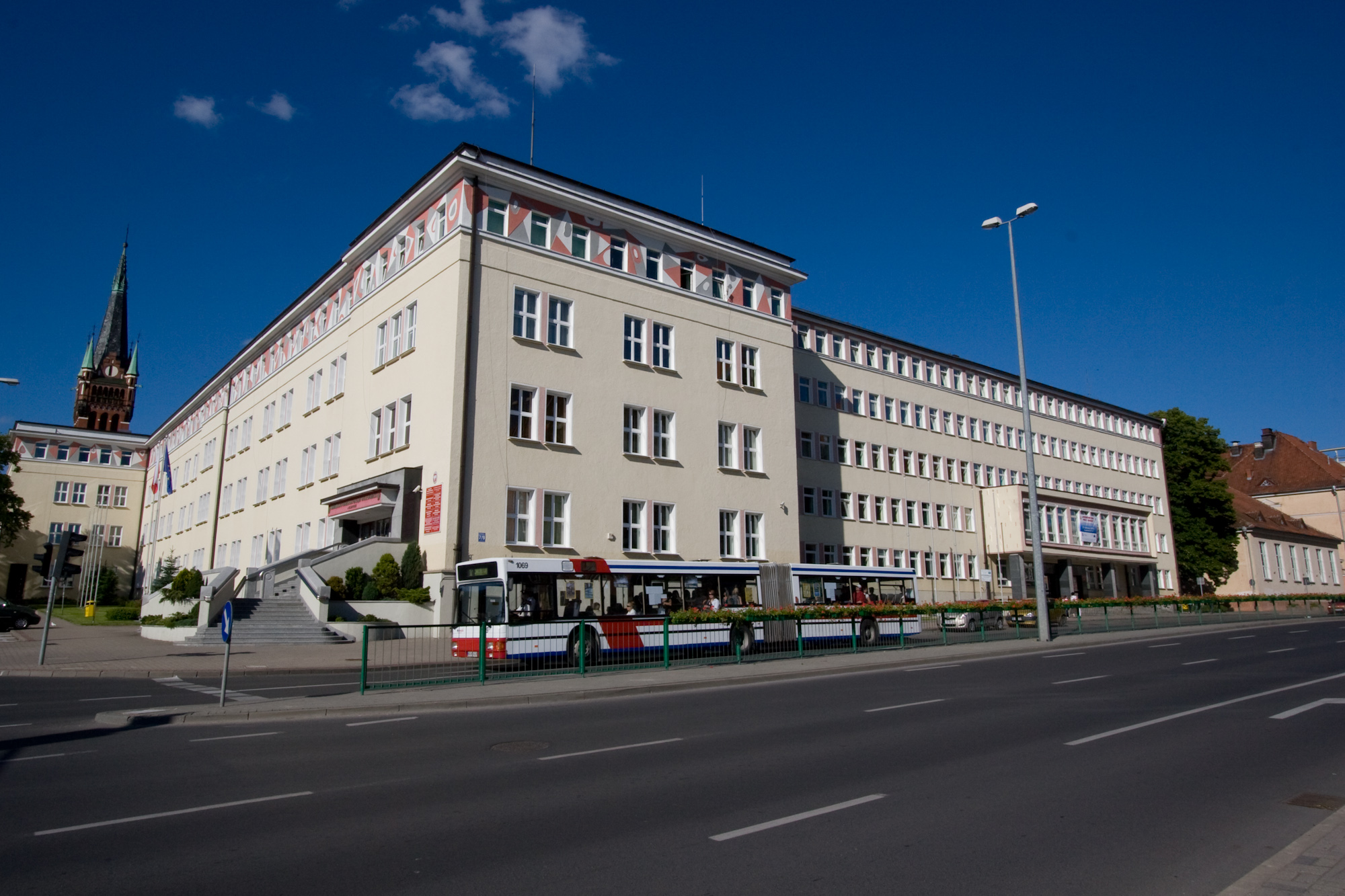
- Voivodeship's Offices, Olsztyn

Website
- Warmian-Masurian Regional Assembly

The Warmian–Masurian Voivodeship Sejmik (Polish: Sejmik Województwa Warmińsko-Mazurskiego) is the regional legislature of the voivodeship of Warmian-Masurian, Poland. It is a unicameral body consists of thirty councillors elected in free elections for a five-year term. The current chairperson of the assembly is Bernadeta Hordejuk of the KO.

The assembly elects the executive board that acts as the collective executive for the regional government, headed by the province's marshal. The current Executive Board of Warmia-Masuria is a coalition government between Civic Coalition, Polish People's Party and Poland 2050 with Gustaw Brzezin of the PSL presiding as marshal.

The Regional Assembly meets in the Marshal's Office in Olsztyn.

== Districts ==
Members of the Assembly are elected from five districts, serve five-year terms. Districts does not have the constituencies formal names. Instead, each constituency has a number and territorial description.

Number	Seats	City counties	Land counties
1	6	Olsztyn	Olsztyn
2	7	None	Działdowo, Iława, Nowe Miasto, Ostróda
3	6	Elbląg	Bartoszyce, Braniewo, Elbląg, Lidzbark
4	5	None	Ełk, Gołdap, Kętrzyn, Olecko, Węgorzewo
5	6	None	Giżycko, Mrągowo, Nidzica, Pisz, Szczytno

== See also ==
- Polish Regional Assembly
- Warmian-Masurian Voivodeship
