= Julia Pitera =

Polish politician (born 1953)

Julia Teresa Pitera
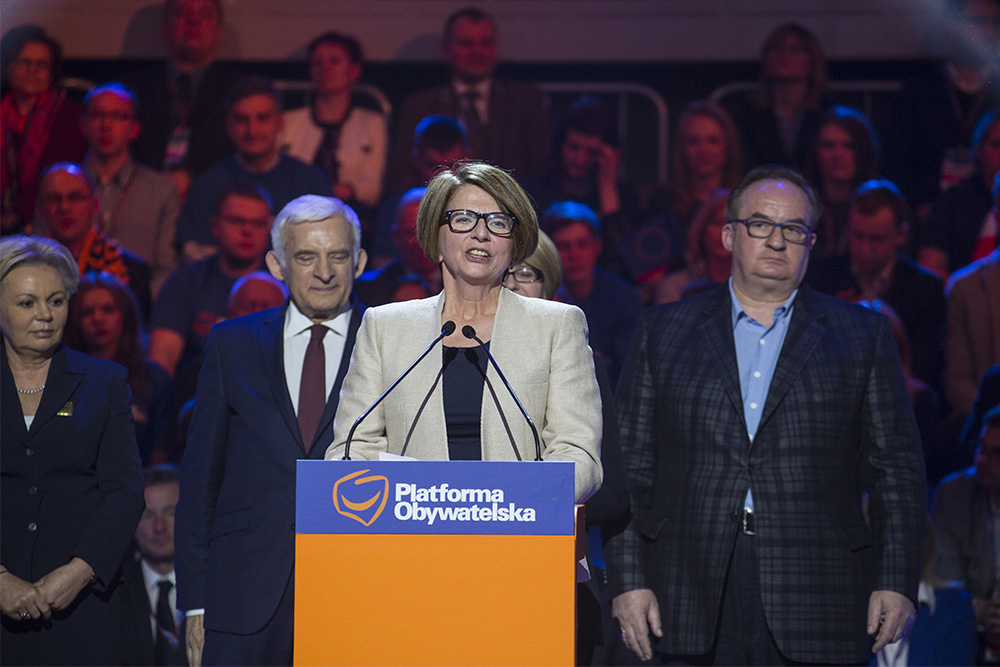

Member of the European Parliament
- In office 2014–2019

Member of the Sejm
- In office 5 November 2007 – 2014

Personal details
- Born: 26 May 1953 (age 72)
- Party: Polish: Civic Platform; EU: European People's Party (EPP)

Julia Teresa Pitera (Polish pronunciation: [ˈjulʲa tɛˈrɛsa pʲiˈtɛra]), née Zakrzewska ([zakˈʂɛfska]), (born 26 May 1953 in Warsaw) is a Polish politician of the Civic Platform.

== Political career ==
Pitera was elected to the Sejm on 21 October 2007, getting 42,669 votes in 19 Płock district as a candidate from the Civic Platform list. She later served as Secretary of State at the Chancellery of Prime Minister Donald Tusk from 2007 to 2011, where she was in charge of the Central Anticorruption Bureau. Between 2012 and 2014, she chaired the Committee on Administration and Digitisation. She resigned from her parliamentary seat in 2014.

Pitera was a Member of the European Parliament from 2014 until 2019. During her time in parliament, she served on the Committee on Petitions. In addition, she was a member of the European Parliament Intergroup on Integrity (Transparency, Anti-Corruption and Organized Crime); the European Parliament Intergroup on Sports; and of the MEP Heart Group (sponsored by the European Heart Network (EHN) and the European Society of Cardiology (ESC)), a group of parliamentarians who have an interest in promoting measures that will help reduce the burden of cardiovascular diseases (CVD).

== Other activities ==
- Transparency International Poland, Chair of the Board, 2001-2005)
- Press Freedom Monitoring Centre, Member (2001-2005)

== Political positions ==
In November 2017, Pitera joined a parliamentary majority by voting in favor of a resolution invoking Article 7 of the Treaty on European Union, thereby potentially stripping Poland of voting rights in the EU for violating the common values of the bloc, including the rule of law. Shortly after, her political opponents had pictures of Pitera and five other Polish politicians strung from a makeshift gallows in a public square in Katowice.

== See also ==
- Members of Polish Sejm 2007-2011
