= Stanisław Kasznica =

Polish Army officer and politician (1908–1948)

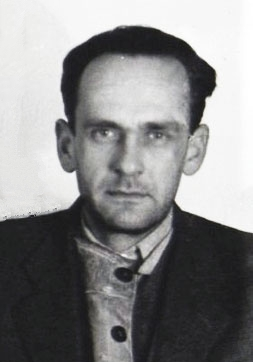
- Kasznica after his arrest by the Ministry of Public Security
- Born: 25 July 1908; Lvov, Austro Hungary
- Died: 12 May 1948 (aged 39); Warsaw, Polish People's Republic
- Burial place: Powązki Military Cemetery
- Military career
- Branch: Military Organization Lizard Union; National Armed Forces; National Military Union
- Rank: Podpolkovnik
- Nicknames: Stanisław Wąsacz, Wąsowski, Przepona, Służa, Maszkowski, Borowski, Stanisław Piotrowski
- Units: National Armed Forces command
- Conflicts: *World War II: Battle of the Bzura; Defense of Warsaw; Warsaw Uprising
- Awards: Virtuti Militari; Order of Polonia Restituta; Cross of Valour; Cross of the National Armed Action

Stanisław Józef Bronisław Kasznica (July 25, 1908 – May 12, 1948) was the last commander of the National Armed Forces (NSZ), an anti-communist, and anti-Nazi paramilitary organization, which was part of the Polish resistance movement in World War II and in the period following it.

== Biography ==
He was born in Lwów, and his father, Stanisław Wincenty Antoni Kasznica, was rector and professor of the Poznań University in Greater Poland. During World War II he initially fought in the Polish Army, joining the National Armed Forces resistance group after the defeat of Polish military.

He participated in the September Campaign of 1939, serving as a reconnaissance officer and then as commander of the 1st Platoon of the 2nd Battery in the 7th Horse Artillery Divizion of the Greater Poland Cavalry Brigade under the command of General Roman Abraham. In General Tadeusz Kutrzeba's Army, he fought in the Battle of the Bzura, advanced from Kutno to Warsaw, and defended the capital. For these actions, he was awarded the Silver Cross of the Virtuti Militari.

From October 1939, he was a leading underground activist of the so-called Szaniec Group (a wartime continuation of the National Radical Camp (ONR-ABC) and one of the co-founders of the Military Organization Lizard Union, a military organization outside the ONR, organizing civilian commissariats on behalf of the ONR-ABC. In Warsaw, he headed the communications of the Lizard Union and the National Armed Forces, while also heading the legal and administrative group and the administrative leadership.

Following the consolidation agreement with the Supreme Court, he joined the presidium of the Provisional National Political Council in July 1943, being one of its eight founders. He also served as head of the general administration of the National Civil Service. In the summer of 1943, as head of the administrative leadership of the National Civil Service, he developed the regulations for the hooded courts for the National Civil Service. After the split in the NSZ in April 1944 over the consolidation agreement with the Home Army, he decided to serve in the branch of the NSZ that did not subordinate itself to the Home Army (NSZ-ZJ).

From July 1944, he served as deputy and later head of Department I of the NSZ-ZJ Headquarters. In the first few days of the Warsaw Uprising, he fought in Ochota, from where he left the capital with the civilian population and traveled to Częstochowa. From August 1944, he was a member of the NSZ Political Council and head of the NSZ-ZJ organizational branch. In September 1944, he was appointed commander of District VIII Częstochowa of the NSZ-ZJ. At that time, a schism also occurred within the NSZ-ZJ community – some activists, grouped in the Holy Cross Mountains Brigade, decided to conclude an agreement with the German occupiers in order to cleanse the area of communists and political opponents of the NSZ-ZJ and the Szaniec Group from non-communist organizations, and, when the Red Army entered Poland, to withdraw soldiers threatened with extermination to the West. Kasznica, pursuing his anti-communist activities, staunchly opposed any collaboration with the Germans. After the fall of the Warsaw Uprising, together with the NSZ-ZJ Commander-in-Chief, Major/Colonel. NSZ Stanisław Nakoniecznikoff-Klukowski (murdered by the Holy Cross Brigade in October 1944 for attempting to merge the last independent NSZ units with the Home Army) began seeking an agreement with the Home Army to jointly oppose the new – this time Soviet – occupation. At the turn of 1944 and 1945, he became commander of the Poznań District of the post-AK organization "NIE", whose goal was to fight the Red Army and the newly installed communist regime.

In March 1945, he became deputy commander of the NSZ-ZJ Western Territories Inspectorate, and from April onward, he served as acting commander of this area. Within this organization, he established three clandestine organizations: the Polish Army (of an intelligence nature), the Generation of Independent Poland (in the academic circles of Poznań and Gdańsk), and the Academic Legion (at Adam Mickiewicz University in Poznań). From March 1945, he also served as head of Department I of the NSZ-ZJ High Command, and in July of that year, he was appointed head of the Council of Inspectors. Until August 1945, he was commander of the Poznań District of the NSZ-ZJ.

After the war he did not cease the fight for Poland's freedom and fought with the NSZ against the Soviet-installed communist regime.

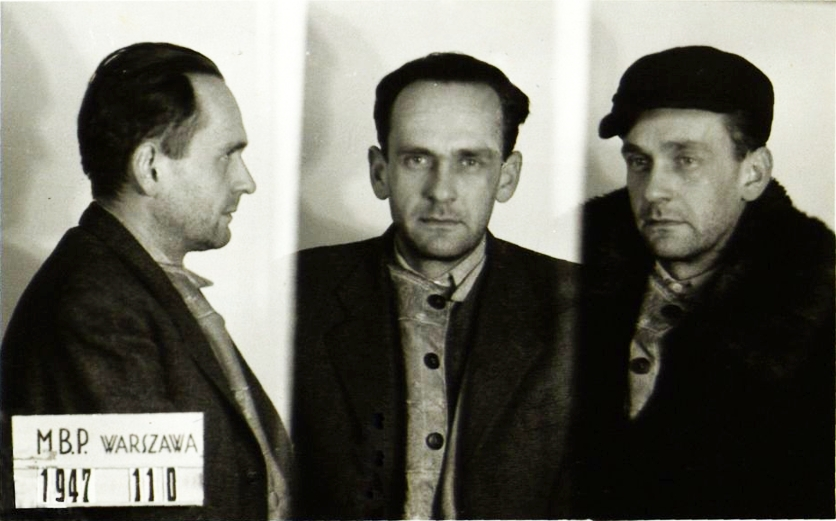
A mugshot of Kasznica done by the Ministry of Public Security following his arrest in 1947

He was arrested by the Polish communist secret police, the Urząd Bezpieczeństwa, in February 1947, tortured and condemned to death by a communist Polish court. He was executed on May 12, 1948, in the Warsaw Mokotów Prison. His symbolic grave is located at Warsaw Powązki Cemetery.

Kasznica used numerous nom de guerres, including Stanisław Wąsacz, Wąsowski, Przepona, Służa, Maszkowski, and Borowski.

On November 1, 1990, at the Powązki Military Cemetery in Warsaw, within the Łączka Headquarters, a monument was unveiled at the initiative of the Social Committee for the Construction of a Monument. It commemorates 241 victims of communist murders from the period 1944–1956, including Stanisław Kasznica. His remains were discovered in 2012 during excavations at the Łączka Headquarters (among 117 people) by researchers from the Institute of National Remembrance, led by Professor Krzysztof Szwagrzyk. They were subsequently identified by specialists from the Pomeranian Medical University in Szczecin as part of the Polish Genetic Database of Victims of Totalitarian Regimes program. This was announced on February 20, 2013. On May 11, 2013, a commemorative plaque honoring Stanisław Kasznica and his brother Jan Kasznica was unveiled on the grounds of the 1st High School in Poznań. On September 27, 2015, Lieutenant Colonel Stanisław Kasznica was ceremoniously buried in the Pantheon-Mausoleum of the Cursed-Unbroken Soldiers at Łączka Cemetery in the Powązki Military Cemetery in Warsaw. On November 9, 2017, he became the patron saint of a street in the Bielany district of Warsaw, replacing Józef Balcerzak. He is also the patron saint of streets in Poznań and Kraków. In 2019, the National Bank of Poland issued a silver collector's commemorative coin with a face value of 10 złoty, part of the "Unbroken Soldiers Cursed by the Communists" series, commemorating Stanisław Kasznica. On March 1, 2023, a monument dedicated to Stanisław Kasznica was unveiled in Głogów as part of the "Alley of Remembrance", alongside 15 other monuments to soldiers of the anti-communist underground.

== Honours and awards ==
- Silver Cross of Virtuti Militari
- Grand Cross of the Order of Polonia Restituta (posthumously, 2009)
- Cross of Valour
- Cross of the National Armed Deed (posthumously, 1993)
- Silver Cross of the National Deed Armed with Swords (1944)
