= ONR-ABC =

National-Radical Camp/Polish Organization Obóz Narodowo-Radykalny/Organizacja Polska
- Abbreviation: ONR/ONR "ABC"
- Leader: Henryk Rossman
- Founder: Henryk Rossman
- Split from: National Radical Camp
- Preceded by: National Radical Camp
- Newspaper: ABC; Nowy Ład
- Membership: 5,000 (1937 est.)
- Ideology: National-radicalism: Polish nationalism; (Note: -Ethnic nationalism -National conservatism -Authoritarian conservatism -Conservative corporatism): Christian nationalism (Note: -National Catholicism); Anti-communism; Antisemitism (Note: -Economic antisemitism); Integralism; Anti-Masonry; Fascism; Corporate Statism
- Political position: Far-right
- Religion: Roman Catholicism
- Slogan: Czołem Wielkiej Polsce ("Hail Great Poland")

National Radical Camp "ABC"/Polish Organization (OP) (Obóz Narodowo-Radykalny "ABC"/Organizacja Polska "OP") was a far-right political organization in the Second Polish Republic, active from 1935 to 1939. It emerged as a faction within the broader National Radical Camp (ONR) following internal divisions and ideological differences. ONR-ABC became one of the most significant radical nationalist movements in Poland during the 1930s.

== History ==
=== Formation and political activity ===
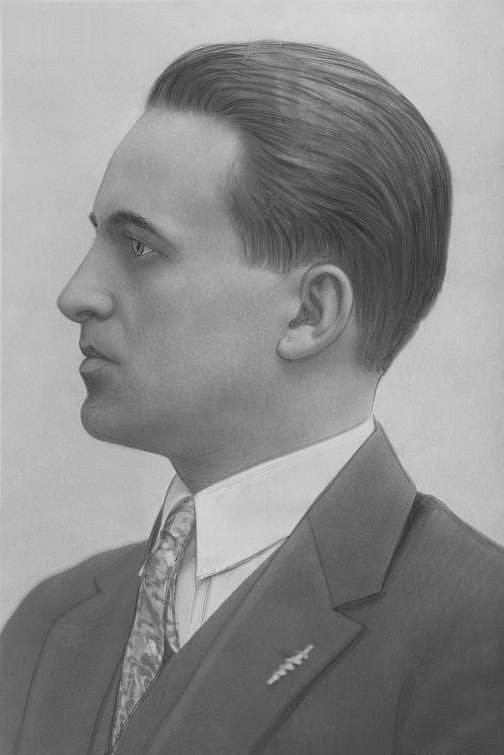
Henryk Rossman one of the leaders of ONR "ABC". Died in 1937.

The second faction of the ONR - known as the Rossmanists or "ABC" group - was an avatar of the closely clandestine four-tier Polish Organization (OP). Its leadership included Henryk Rossman, Antoni Goerne, Mieczysław Harusewicz, Aleksander Heinrich, Jan Jodzewicz, Jan Korolec, Witold Kozłowski, Jerzy Kurcyusz, Wiktor Martini, Wincenty Mianowski, Witold Rościszewski, Tadeusz Salski, Włodzimierz Sylwestrowicz and Tadeusz Todtleben. The underground ONR operated through cells ("fives") aggregated according to territorial (district, provincial groups) and environmental criteria (Youth Territory, Medical, Legal, Workers, Merchants and Craftsmen, and others). The group's legal front was primarily academic associations, registered from 1936 at individual universities: The National Union of Polish Radical Youth in Warsaw, the National-Radical Youth in Poznań, the Union of Independent National Youth in Wilno, as well as the Senior Scout Circle of St. George, and the J.L. Poplawski Political Discussion Club and the H. Rossman Discussion Club, which were created in 1939 in Warsaw. The ONR gained great influence in the Warsaw and Poznań academic corporations and the Union for the Advancement of Polish Property (the so-called Polish Union), bringing together merchant and craft circles to fight Jewish competition. While the daily ABC was, from the fall of 1936, the main propaganda tube of the Rossmanists, the theoretical organ remained the "Nowy Ład" monthly. Periodicals were also published: "Alma Mater," "Goniec Warszawski," "Jutro" and the Łowicz "Polska Narodowa" (formerly associated with the SN). Conspiratorial publications included "Sztafeta", "Sztafeta Podlaska", "Bojowiec", "Miecz Wielkopolski" and "O.N.R.-owiec." Krzysztof Kawęcki notes that ONR "ABC" developed mainly in Warsaw and Poznań. Marek Windyga went so far as to say that "the history of the ONR in Warsaw, is to a large extent the history of the entire ONR." However, the activities of the Rossmanists were also noted in Pomerania, Silesia, Podlasie (Lomza, Siedlce), Kraków, Wilno, Łódz, Czestochowa, Lowicz, Płock, Lublin, Łuck and Równe - these centers were represented at the ONR "ABC" congress in Lwów in late January 1937. In Warsaw, the number of ONR "ABC" was estimated at 150-500 people, nationwide at 2,000.

=== Crisis within the organization ===
Disorganized by repression and split, ONR "ABC" initially conducted its activities with less momentum than "Falanga". In addition, the position of the Rossmanists was weakened by their vacillating attitude during the blockade of the university in November 1936. Another blow to the movement was the death of Henryk Rossmann in February 1937, followed by the departure of Wojciech Zaleski and Jerzy Kurcyusz in the course of the struggle for leadership. Within the organization, there were ongoing discussions on tactics between supporters of the long-term "march through institutions" (i.e., infiltration of the state apparatus and major political forces) and enthusiasts of the "national revolution" (Wiktor Martini, Otmar Wawrzkowicz).

=== An attempt to break the impasse ===
In an attempt to resolve the impasse in 1937, the ONR "ABC" initiated the formation of the Polish Confederation - a movement with a vague program and a loose structure (the only body was to be the Citizens' Court). The program of the Confederation, open to all national-Catholic elements, testified to the impoverishment of national-radical ideology - it was limited to vague slogans of "the good of the Polish Nation," "Christian ethics" and "social justice." The project failed (in October 1938, the Confederation was dissolved by the authorities due to de facto abandonment of its activities), as did the attempt made the following year to legalize the National-Radical Party. Representatives of the (editors of the magazines "Nowy Ład," "ABC," "Jutro") participated only in a loose agreement of young-national, national-Pilsudskiites and imperialist groups - the so-called Youth Press Committee.

=== Attitude towards National Democracy and other nationalist organizations ===
The fresh conflict with the SN made agreement with this ideologically closest camp impossible. Although the considered itself the heir to the national-democratic heritage, it did not intend to be its slave. Merciless criticism was levied against the "managers of the old political parties," hindering the unification of the nation, the unprogrammability of National Democracy and its tactics of sterile opposition, and finally the identification of the nation with the National Party. It was believed that the Party's pursuit of a "monopoly on nationalism" was leading to divisions in the national camp, a situation in which "the nationalist [...] cries out that the O.N.R. will fight on an equal footing with communism." An ABC editorial in November 1936 reproached the National Democratic Party's leadership that "While the leaders of the young-nationalist movement were in Bereza, it was the older men who were enjoying blissful peace in their retreats at home," and announced: "we have no intention whatsoever of stepping on the toes of the young people who have been stupefied by the older men." Back in the spring of 1939, an attempt to reach an agreement with the All-Polish Youth failed. Both the "venom of senile hatred" of the SN and the "chad of youthful megalomania" of the Falangists were subjected to symmetrical criticism; the National-State faction (ZMN) was equally negative.

=== Further political activity ===
As a result, the political line of the Rossmanists oscillated between the opposition of the Front Morges and Sanation. Thus, on the one hand, contacts were sought with the People's Party in order to create a "broad national consensus," while on the other hand, negotiations were held with the authorities. Rossman was said to have already sought contact with the Sanation during his stay in Bereza; talks with representatives of the ruling camp began in the fall of 1936 and continued in the spring of 1937. The was the main initiator of Marshal Śmigły-Rydz's meeting with national youth at the "Arkonia" commerce on May 18, 1937, but did not achieve any success. At that time - the concession to organize the ZMP was obtained by the Falanga. Still in the autumn of 1937, Tadeusz Gluziński handed Adam Koc a letter in which he wrote: "we declare that in the crackdown on the factors of the so-called folxfront, you can count on our full cooperation within the limits of our technical and propaganda capabilities, and regardless of the tactical attitude of other national groupings." The paths of the and the Sanation, however, diverged. While at the beginning of November 1937 the publicists of "O.N.R.-owiec" believed that the Koc faction was gravitating toward nationalism, just two weeks later they condemned Koc (as a "party man"), the ZMP ("a symbol of perfidious gamesmanship") and the OZN ("attempts to save Sanation"). After OZN's break with the Falanga, the again revived the idea of compromise with sanation, as documented by a series of gestures, such as the conciliatory leaflet "In view of the Wilno events!" or government support during the Lithuanian and Czechoslovak crises. In 1938, the leaders of the group (Alexander Heinrich, Jan Jodzewicz and Jerzy Kurcyusz) went on a visit to Marshal Śmigły-Rydz. In June of the following year, J. Jodzewicz made an offer to cooperate with the government without any preconditions.

=== Participation in elections ===
ONR "ABC" did not boycott the local elections in 1938–1939. In Warsaw, the group started as the National Radical Committee for the De-Jewishization of Warsaw, winning 8.5% of the votes and 5 seats (against 8 seats for the SN). In Poznań, the National Radical Electoral Committee put forward a candidate in only one district (Stanisław Kasznica), who received 457 votes; in Wielkopolska, ONR won 2 seats. In total, the ONR lists won 1.2% votes. also gained unofficial parliamentary representation – MP Franciszek Stoch. However, from March 1939 the ONR "ABC" noted a decline in activity.

=== Secret organizational structure ===
The Polish Organization (OP) was a secret internal organization of the National-Radical Camp, established April 1934; it consisted of several levels of initiation arranged hierarchically, starting with the lowest, were as follows:

1. Level "S" (Section)
2. Level "C" (Czarniecki)
3. Level "Z" (National Order)
4. Level "A" (Political Committee)

The lowest level "S" (section), then "C" (Czarniecki), "Z" (Zakon Narodowy) were led by the Executive Committee (chairman W. Martini); the highest authority of the OP was the three-person level "A" (Political Committee) with undisclosed composition.

=== During World War II ===
The dualistic structure - a strictly conspiratorial, hierarchical Polish Organization and overt activities (editorials of magazines, such as "ABC", participation in legal associations) - proved useful after the September defeat. The leadership of the OP quite quickly worked out a plan for political and military work in the underground. The most important was the decision made on October 14, 1939 to form the Military Organization Lizard Union, headed by Władysław Marcinkowski "Jaxa". Efforts were made to recruit officers who had been reluctant to join the Sanation before 1939. Political and command authority over the ZJ was carried out by the Szaniec Group. During conspiration the composition of the OP was reconstructed; successive chairmen of the Executive Committee: S. Nowicki, T. Salski; chairmen of the Political Committee: W. Brodowski, Stanisław Kasznica, K. Romer, B. Sobocinski; OP was subordinate to outside organizations, including Military Organization Lizard Union and environmental organizations: "Crew" (workers'), Union of People's Activists. ("Zydel"), Union of Polish Advocates, Union of Reconstruction of Law, Youth of Great Poland, Wiara i Wola (women's). On 20 September 1942, from the merger of the ZJ and the secessionists from the armed wing of the SN – the National Military Organization (NOW) – and several smaller right-wing organizations, the National Armed Forces (NSZ) were formed. From 1942 to 1944, members of the Executive Committee of OP, as representatives of ONR, were members of the Presidium of the Provisional National Political Council – political body superior to the NSZ. After the agreement to merge the NSZ with the Home Army (AK) was concluded in March 1944, the NSZ split. In April 1944, the nationalists from the ONR resumed their independent activities under the name NSZ-ONR. The most important formation of the NSZ-ONR was the Holy Cross Mountains Brigade established in August 1944 under the command of Captain Antoni Szacki, which was the only Polish military unit during World War II that openly collaborated with Nazi Germany. 1945-47 OP broken up by arrests, ceased activities.

Military Organization Lizard Union emblem

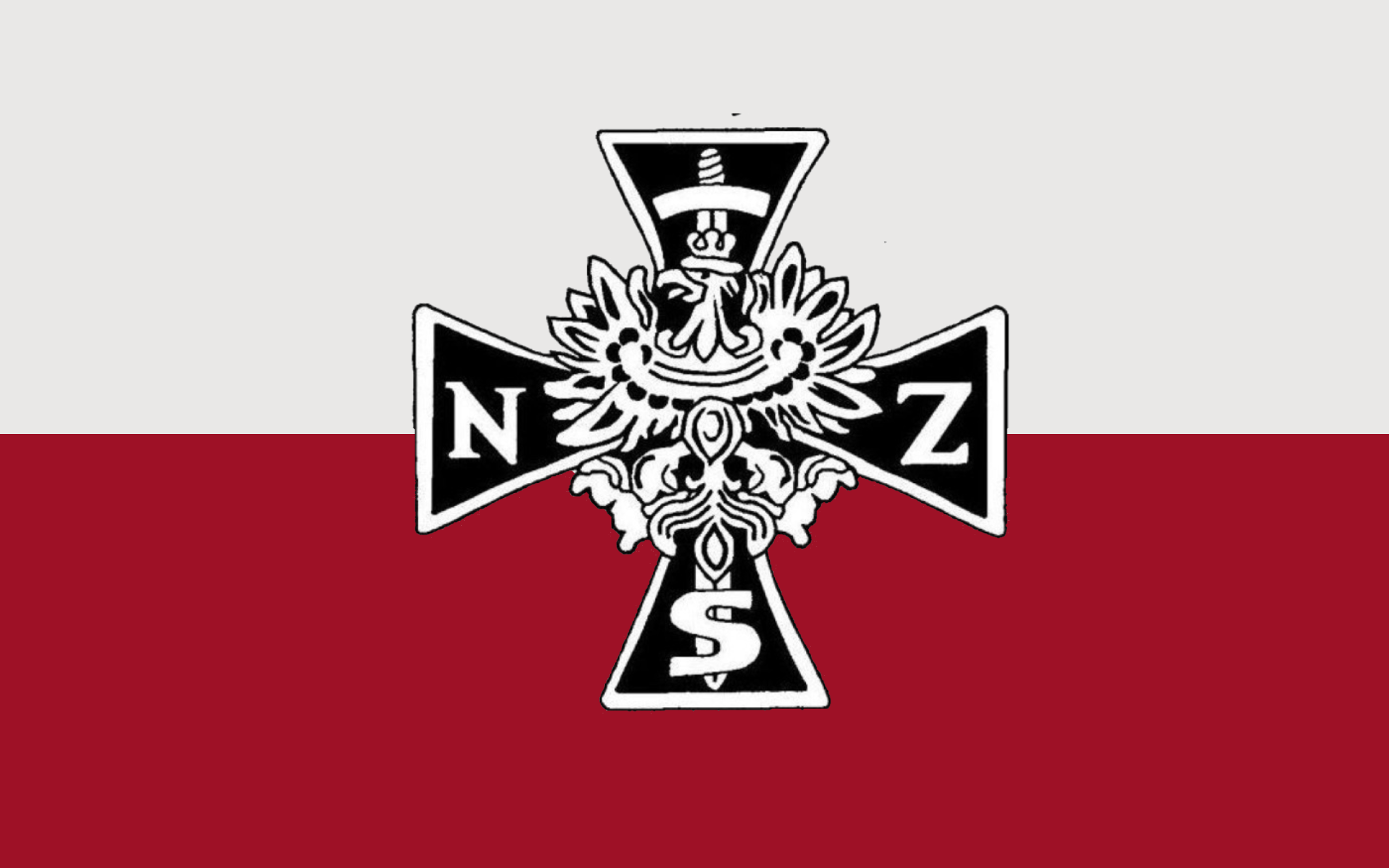
Flag of National Armed Forces (NSZ)

Holy Cross Mountains Brigade of ONR emblem

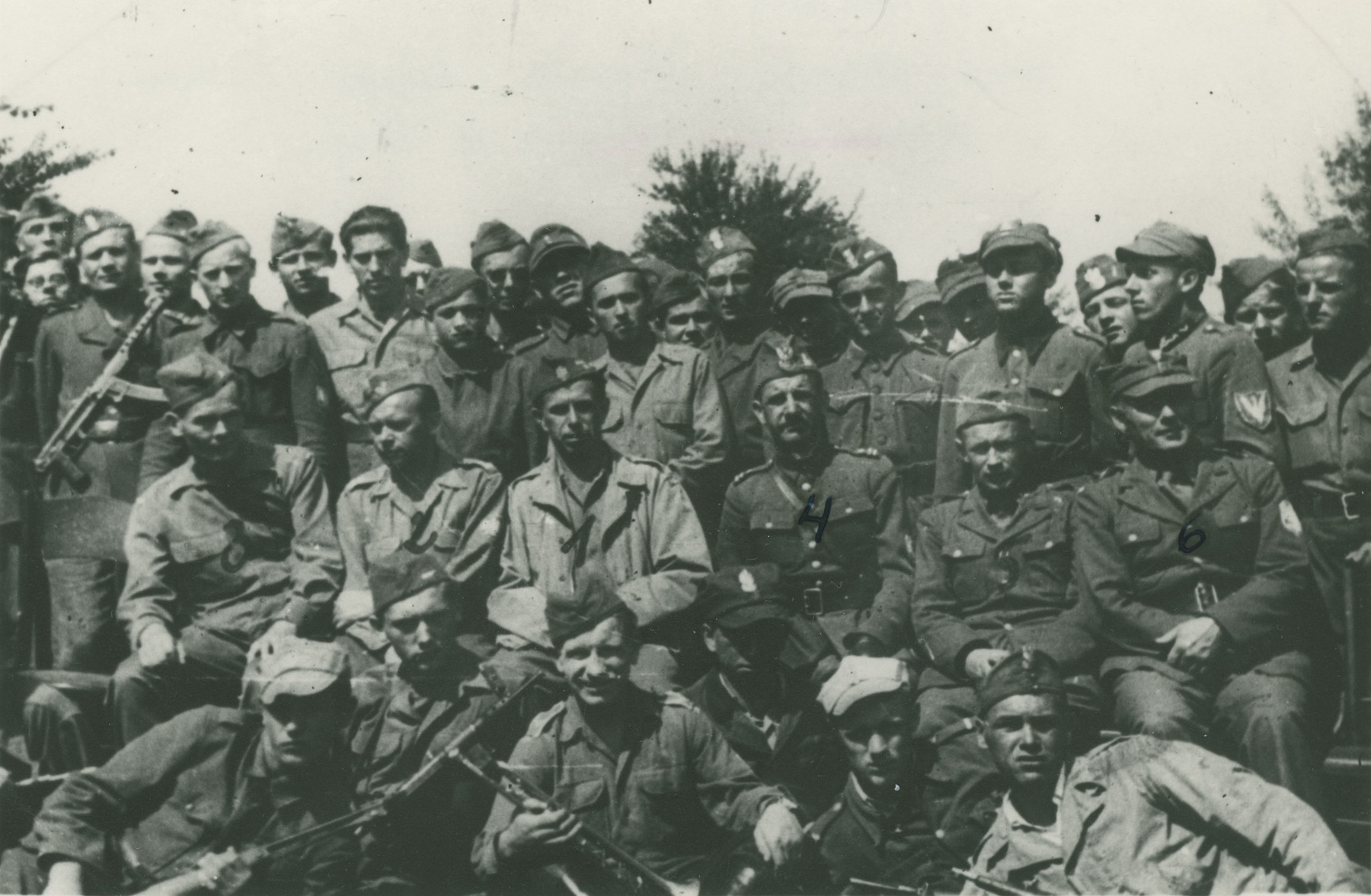
Soldiers of the Holy Cross Mountains Brigade of ONR

== See also ==
- National Radical Camp
- National Rebirth of Poland
- Falanga
- National Democracy (Poland)
- Polish nationalism
