= Holy Cross Mountains Brigade =

Far-right Polish WWII resistance unit

- Brygada Świętokrzyska
- Post–World War II badge
- Leader: Colonel Antoni Szacki
- Dates active: 11 August 1944 – June 1946
- Group: National Armed Forces – National Radical Camp (NSZ-ONR)
- Ideology: Polish nationalism, Anti-communism, Anti-Sovietism, National Radicalism

The Holy Cross Mountains Brigade (Polish: Brygada Świętokrzyska) was a controversial tactical unit of the Polish National Armed Forces established on 11 August 1944. It did not obey orders to merge with the Home Army in 1944 and was a part of the Military Organization Lizard Union faction, related to the National Radical Camp political party. Its soldiers fought simultaneously with Nazi Germany, the Soviet Union and the Polish communist underground, though it sometimes collaborated with the Nazis to further its anti-communist, anti-Jewish and totalitarian goals.

== Second Polish Republic background ==
In 1934, within the National Party (Stronnictwo Narodowe, SN), a secret radically right-wing faction emerged, known as the Internal Organization. They were critical in respect to the democratic traditions of the SN and in April 1934 gave rise to the splinter National Radical Camp (Obóz Narodowo Radykalny, ONR). The movement was quickly delegalized by the Sanation regime and many ONR activists ended up in the Bereza Kartuska camp for political opponents. In 1935 the ONR split further into the National Radical Camp Falanga and the National Radical Camp "ABC", the latter dominated by members of the Internal Organization. The ONR "ABC" promoted an extreme "social-national" ideology, which included the call for expulsion of the ethnic minorities in Poland, specifically in the Kresy macro-region especially the Germans, Lithuanians, Belarusians, Ukrainians and Jews, and allowing only ethnic Poles who could prove their racial purity up to the fourth generation back (cultural assimilation was excluded) in state leadership positions. The state model proposed by ONR "ABC" activists was indeed fascist. In practice, the state was to be part of the party, and no political party apart from ONR "ABC" would have the right to exist.

== World War II background ==
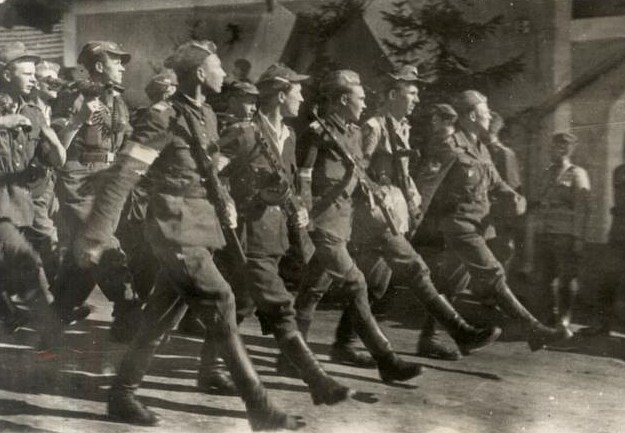
Soldiers of the Holy Cross Mountains Brigade in parade (1945)

After the Polish defeat in September 1939, the ONR "ABC" people formed the conspiratorial Szaniec Group. They refused to recognize the authority of the Polish government-in-exile. Szaniec's Military Organization Lizard Union (ZJ) did not become associated with the Home Army (AK), the main Polish underground force. Together with a splinter group from the National Military Organization (NOW) they created the National Armed Forces (NSZ), but the NSZ leaders soon became engaged in rivalry and disagreements over the issue of reaching an understanding with the Polish Underground State and acknowledging the Home Army command, which the individuals from the Lizard Union continued to refuse to do. The rivalry became violent to the point of the Szaniec faction murdering NSZ officers who joined the AK. The split resulted in the establishment of a conspiracy known as the NSZ-ONR, whose leaders, obsessively preoccupied with the issues of treason and pro-communist "fifth column" even killed the top NSZ-ONR commander, Stanisław Nakoniecznikow, whom they previously installed themselves. At the time of the formal Polish-Soviet alliance (1941–43), the "NSZ Declaration" equally considered Nazi Germany and the Soviet Union enemies and stressed the organization's determination to fight communist attempts to establish their rule in Poland.

== Creation ==
The Soviet military successes on the Eastern Front caused the NSZ to adjust its program in mid-1943. Because of indirectly benefiting the Soviet Union, anti-German activities were to be discouraged. The main enemies were now considered to be the Soviet Union and its "communist agencies" in Poland: the People's Guard (GL) and its successor the People's Army (AL), the Polish Workers' Party (PPR) and the Soviet partisans, who were active also in Poland.

Lacking a large military unit, the nationalists issued on 11 August 1944 an order establishing the Holy Cross Mountains Brigade. The brigade was created in August 1944 in the Kielce region out of the 204th infantry battalion and Special Action Groups of the NSZ-ZJ. It varied in number from 822 soldiers in December 1944 to 1418 soldiers in May 1945. The purpose of the brigade was the realization of the political and military program of the NSZ-ONR. The commander of the brigade was Colonel Antoni Szacki ("Bohun-Dabrowski").

== Military engagements in Poland ==
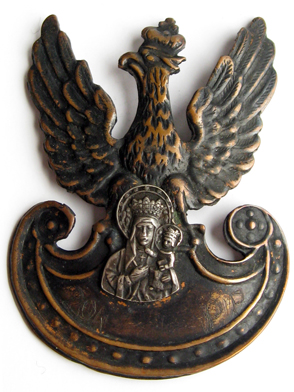
Holy Cross Mountains Brigade cap badge

The formation fought most of all against the Soviet NKVD forces, the Polish communist partisans of the People's Army (at Fanisławice and Borów) and the partisans of other Polish non-communist resistance movement military organizations, such as the Home Army (AK), the Peasant Battalions (BCh) and the actual National Armed Forces (NSZ) that maintaining internal organizational autonomy merged with the AK in April 1944.

Although the brigade occasionally fought also against the Germans (among others at Brzeście, Zagnańsk, Caców, and Marcinkowice), it avoided confrontations with the occupier and stressed a "clearing of the Polish territories", not only of "red banditry" (i.e. communists), but also of "their fifth column", which from the point of view of this formation included all Polish political trends standing to the left of the Szaniec faction, such as socialists, peasant movement, Christian democrats and even pro-democratic nationalists. The brigade portrayed themselves as the only truly Polish force representing Polish national interests. They stood against democracy in any form because of its supposedly "Judeo-Masonic origin", striving to the establishment in Poland the rule of one ideology and one "national" organization, i.e., to put it bluntly, a fascist, totalitarian dictatorship.

The brigade's major success was its defeat of a joint People's Army and Soviet partisans force in a battle fought on 8 September 1944 near Rząbiec. The battle took place after a patrol of the brigade was captured by the communist formations, and its members tortured and slated for summary execution. One of the captured prisoners managed to escape and alerted the brigade to the situation. The brigade attacked and defeated the AL and Soviet soldiers. The Soviet captives were executed and several Poles of the AL who were accused of banditry as well. Thirteen of the captured Polish communists joined the brigade. In individual actions units of the brigade killed several hundred members and sympathizers of the PPR and the AL, in what one historian, Rafał Wnuk, described as a bloody and brutal civil war fought between communists and nationalists in the Kielce province.

== Evacuation out of Poland ==
As the Soviet Red Army approached Poland, the leaders of the NSZ-ONR decided to evacuate the brigade to the territories controlled by the Western Allies. In January 1945 it began a retreat through Silesia into the Protectorate of Bohemia and Moravia. At first the brigade was attacked by the Germans because it lacked their permission for the movement. By January 15 the consent was obtained and the retreat continued. The partisans received German food rations and accepted Wehrmacht and Gestapo liaison officers (one of them was Hauptsturmführer SS Paul Fuchs from Radom District - who had been in constant contact with the Brigade since the fall of 1944 through Hubert Jura - a Polish agent of the SD and Gestapo) to accompany them during the trip. The brigade received uniforms and equipment from the Germans, and then also weapons. Finally, there are documented cases of sick or injured Brigade soldiers being sent to German hospitals.

In April 1945, now in the Protectorate of Bohemia and Moravia, the brigade found itself in an area surrounded by substantial German forces and its German contacts began insisting on closer collaboration. As a result, the commanders of the brigade agreed to a limited plan whereby small units of the force were to cross or be parachuted by the Germans back into Poland in order to carry out intelligence work and possibly sabotage at the rear of the advancing Red Army. According to former soldiers, they were all instructed by the brigade's command to ignore their German assigned tasks once in Poland and instead try to make contact with NSZ-ONR headquarters. Out of the units sent, two turned around and made their way back to the main force, while several ran into Soviet and Polish communist forces and were liquidated. During the same period, the second in command, Władysław Marcinkowski pseudonym "Jaxa", took part in a German sponsored conference involving various collaborationist and fascist organizations during which, according to Marcinkowski, the Germans made an offer of forming a Vlasov style formation out of the brigade. Marcinkowski refused the offer and tried to stall by claiming not to have the authority to agree to it.

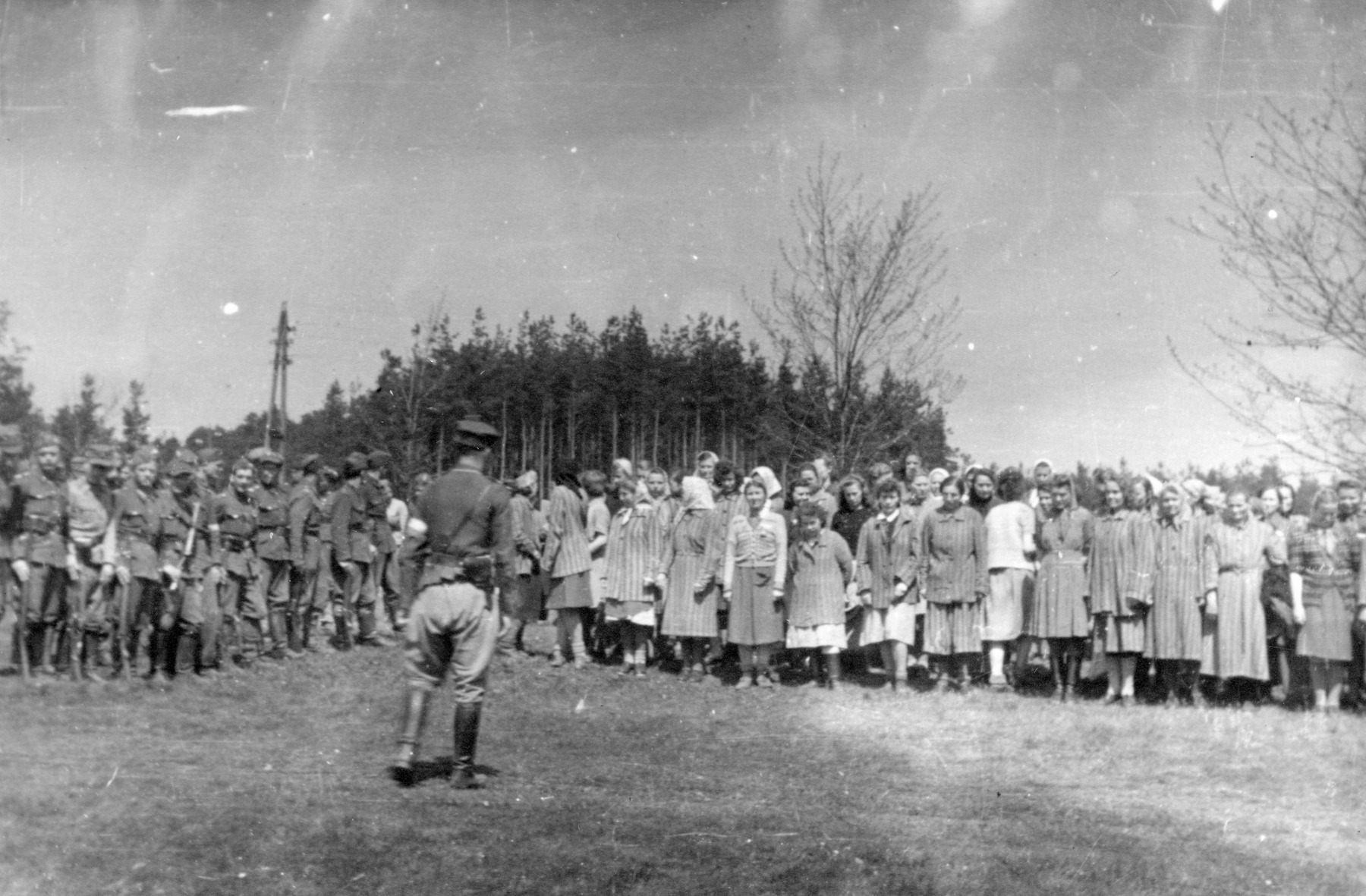
Soldiers of the Holy Cross Mountains Brigade and a group of freed female prisoners from the camp in Holýšov

According to the historian Rafał Wnuk, the brigade command dispatched about one hundred men to the German intelligence Abwehr training center, from where most of them were sent or were in process of being sent to Poland for anti-Soviet diversionary activities.

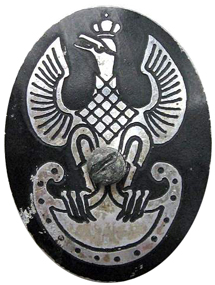
The 25th Polish Auxiliary Guard cap badge. After the end of World War II, the Holy Cross Mountains Brigade became the 25th Polish Auxiliary Guard Company of the United States Army in occupied Germany.

Marcinkowski, along with Hubert Jura, pseudonym "Tom", who was the main liaison officer between the Germans and the brigade, were members of the extreme-right faction Szaniec within the NSZ-ZJ (which was itself a far-right faction of the pre-1944 NSZ). Jura's role in the actions undertaken by the unit during this time have not been fully explained. Jura was a Gestapo or SD agent and he used internal politics of the NSZ-ZJ to settle personal scores (under the guise of "fighting communism within NSZ-ZJ"). There were outstanding death sentences for collaboration issued against him by both the Home Army and the portion of the pre-1944 NSZ which merged with it.

While the brigade was in Bohemia, Col. Szacki made contacts with the anti-German Czech underground and became involved in clandestine plans for an uprising in Plzeň.

On 5 May the Brigade liberated a part of the Flossenbürg concentration camp at Holýšov. The brigade made contact with the U.S. Third Army on 6 May 1945. On the following day, the brigade fought alongside troops of the U.S. 2nd Infantry Division in the assault that liberated Plzeň and restored it to Czechoslovakia.

Following the end of the war in Europe, the presence of the brigade in Czechoslovakia became a contentious political issue for the U.S. forces. The British War Office declined to accept the brigade as a reinforcement unit for the Polish forces under their command. On 6 August 1945, the brigade was disarmed and moved to a displaced persons camp in Coburg. Subsequently, men of the brigade were used in the formation of 25 Polish guard companies in the American-occupied zone of Germany. The U.S. CIC kept tabs on the brigade's leadership during this time as the U.S. Army did not want any incidents with the Soviet forces. The brigade was demobilized on 17 June 1946 and, under the pressure from communist diplomacy, most of the Polish guard companies were disbanded in 1947. Some of the senior officers of the brigade resettled in the United States.

The Holy Cross Mountains Brigade tried to join the Polish Armed Forces in the West, but the Polish government-in-exile in London did not agree to allow members of a formation which did not cooperate with the Home Army, did not recognize the Polish Underground State, and collaborated with the Germans to become recognized combatants of the Polish Armed Forces. In the years that followed, the brigade veterans repeatedly sought the status of former Polish soldiers but their petitions were consistently denied. Only in 1988, when prominent Polish political and military leaders during the World War II were already dead, the Polish government-in-exile recognized NSZ-ONR soldiers as combatants, while denying this right to their "leadership factors", i.e. the command, who were responsible for collaboration with the occupier.

== Nazi collaboration ==
=== Extent of collaboration ===
Documents uncovered in the German Federal Archives in Koblenz contain correspondence between the Gestapo and the NSZ-ONR indicating close collaboration as far as tracking Jews was concerned. This included in particular the Holy Cross Mountain brigade in the district of Radom. By the end of 1943 and beginning of 1944, the cooperation of the brigade with the German police in the Radom district acquired a permanent character. This cooperation included the lookout for Jews hiding in the forests to deliver to the Germans. In 1944, members of the High Command of the Home Army were abducted from their offices by the NSZ-ONR and handed to the Germans.

An important role in the Brigade was played by a member of its staff - special tasks officer, Capt. Hubert Jura alias "Tom" (SD and Gestapo agent), who was also the head of the executive of department II, had been in constant contact since 1943 with SS-Hauptsturmführer Paul Fuchs, head of the Radom Gestapo unit responsible for combating the Polish underground in the Radom district. For collaborating with the German occupier, betraying him or eliminating real and imaginary communists and hiding Jews, he was sentenced to death by the court at the NSZ Headquarters, which he managed to avoid. When there was a split in the NSZ and the Holy Cross Mountains Brigade was beginning to be formed, he established contact with it, which, despite knowing about him, accepted him into its ranks.

Due to contacts with SS and Gestapo officer Paul Fuchs, a secret torture center was organized in a villa provided by the Gestapo at Jasnogórska Street in Częstochowa, which from then on became the headquarters of "Tom's Organization". The villa was apparently connected to the Gestapo headquarters next to it by an underground corridor and a direct telephone line. The basement of the villa was adapted into an improvised prison. There was also a torture chamber in the villa, where the victims were tortured. Not only members of the PPR, and AL were murdered there, but also political opponents of the Holy Cross Mountains Brigade from non-communist organizations (both left-wing, such as AL, and right-wing, e.g. NSZ-AK). Their liquidation was intended for the political base of the Brigade originating from the ONR to take over full power in Poland by way of a coup d'etat and to introduce a fascist dictatorship there. People such as Maksymilian Rolland, Otmar Wawrzkowicz and Hubert Jura (members of the Holy Cross Mountains Brigade and Tom's Organization, Otmar and Hubert were also SD and Gestapo agents) were responsible for the murders.

During the closing days of the war, on 13 January 1945, the 850-strong Brigade began, with German approval and under German protection, the trek westward through Silesia to Czechoslovakia. They were permitted to continue to march southwest to Bohemia, where their unit was confined at an encampment in March. The collapsing Third Reich was hoping to use the Holy Cross Brigade for propaganda purposes and to deploy it at the front On 6 May 1945, the Holy Cross Brigade made its way to the American-occupied zone of Germany.

The Polish command agreed to assign a small number of volunteer troops to be sent, including by air, behind the Soviet lines.

In occupied Czech territory, Major "Jaxa" conducted recruitment for a sabotage course—this time for volunteers—for redeployment behind the front lines in Poland. Fourteen volunteers were transported by train to Lubitz near Gross-Vosek on March 8, 1945, to Luftwaffe barracks. The program of this shortened course included minesweeping and sabotage, such as destroying bridges and railway tracks, cutting down telegraph poles and disrupting telephone communications, and parachuting, as well as locating and securing drop zones, signaling, and receiving drops. Until the end of the war, the Holy Cross Brigade, under the direction of German officers, systematically trained several dozen sabotage, sabotage, and intelligence groups.

The volunteers were given confidential orders to shoot any German assigned to them upon landing. In any event, no Germans were attached, and a small number that made it back to Poland promptly reported back to the NSZ-ONR leadership and re-entered the struggle against the communists.

The brigade refused participation in the anti-German military Operation Tempest; this lack of participation was allegedly aimed at preventing the communist takeover of Poland.

According to the Polish Institute of National Remembrance, there were no documented cases of Holy Cross Brigade soldiers directly murdering Polish Jews due to their ethnic origin. Representative of the veterans Jan Józef Kasprzyk described the claims of Nazi collaboration as a product of postwar communist propaganda meant to smear the unit's legacy. This opinion was not agreed by prof. Andrzej Friszke.

=== Collaboration in Home Army reports ===
As stated in reports by the Polish Home Army, the brigade was well armed and trained and operated in an almost open environment, and its units were resented by the civilian population. The head of the intelligence service of the Home Army Kielce Inspectorate noted that the cooperation with the Gestapo "was basically open and individual commanders did not hide the fact that they received weapons and ammunition to fight against communism from the occupying authorities". A report of the commander of the Home Army in the Radom district from 2 January 1945 states: "The clear cooperation with Germans and the plague of the society as a result of the use of props. On November 22nd, during the march of the NSZ-ONR through Oleszno, the Germans pulled in the posts. Contacts with the Gestapo are recorded." Another note of the Home Army reports on NSZ-ONR officers discussing the manhunts on the PPR.

=== Other ===
The agrarian People's Party (SL), one of the main components of the Underground State, accused the NSZ-ONR and its Holy Cross Mountains Brigade of contacts with and enjoying support of the Germans. The movement's periodicals described the extreme nationalists as "openly treasonous", and of being a "political fascist creation". After the end of the war, the People's Party under the leadership of Wincenty Witos decided to support Stanisław Mikołajczyk. However at the same time Polish communists named one of their proxy parties People's Party, and the old People's Party, now loyal to Mikołajczyk, changed its name into Polish People's Party (PSL). After Mikołajczyk's defeat in the rigged 1947 Polish legislative election, the remains of the Polish People's Party were merged (in 1949) into the communist-allied United People's Party (ZSL).

Even the portion of the NSZ which merged with the Home Army cut oneself from the Holy Cross Mountains Brigade. In one of the NSZ's periodicals from November 1944, they stated that "the National Armed Forces have nothing to do with the so-called ′Holy Cross Mountains Brigade′ and the black legend created by the latter". In turn, an internal bulletin intended for local structures of the National Democratic underground, informed: "Due to a number of incidents of collaboration between the NSZ-ONR and the Germans, the headquarters of the NSZ-SN have announced a change of the name of its formation. The SN is to issue a proclamation in which it is to point out that the NOW and NSZ troops are far from the policies and methods of the ONR and NSZ-ONR". In mid-November 1944, a meeting of the military commanders of the NSZ and the former NOW (absorbed by the AK in 1942) with the leaders of the national conservative National Party (SN), which was the political background of the NSZ, took place in Grodzisk Mazowiecki. They decided that in the face of the entry of the Red Army into Polish lands and the Soviets installing a puppet communist regime, as well as the disintegration of the AK, a new military organization should be established. This is how the National Military Union (NZW) was founded. It was one of the largest post-war Polish anti-communist underground organizations. In 1947, most of the NZW units were broken up by the communist security services, a few continued their activities until the mid-1950s.

Captain Józef Wyrwa, the commander of one of the NSZ units operating in Kielce region, in his memoirs published after World War II in Francoist Spain, assessed the effects of the activities of the NSZ-ONR and Holy Cross Mountains Brigade:

"The brigade put dangerous weapons into the communists' hands. Having irrefutable evidence of the brigade's collaboration with the Germany, it was easy for the communists to blame the entire NSZ and even the AK. Only few Poles, especially here in exile, realize that in fact there were two factions of the NSZ. The real National Armed Forces, which maintaining their political orientation, subordinated themselves to the unified command of the Home Army, and a faction originating from the ONR (National Radical Camp), which acted arbitrarily, collaborating with the Germany to the detriment of Poland. Due to the brigade's fault, many valuable people died in prison. Each member of the NSZ was treated by the Security Office as a German collaborationist. The damages caused to Poland by the brigade are heinous".

== Legacy ==
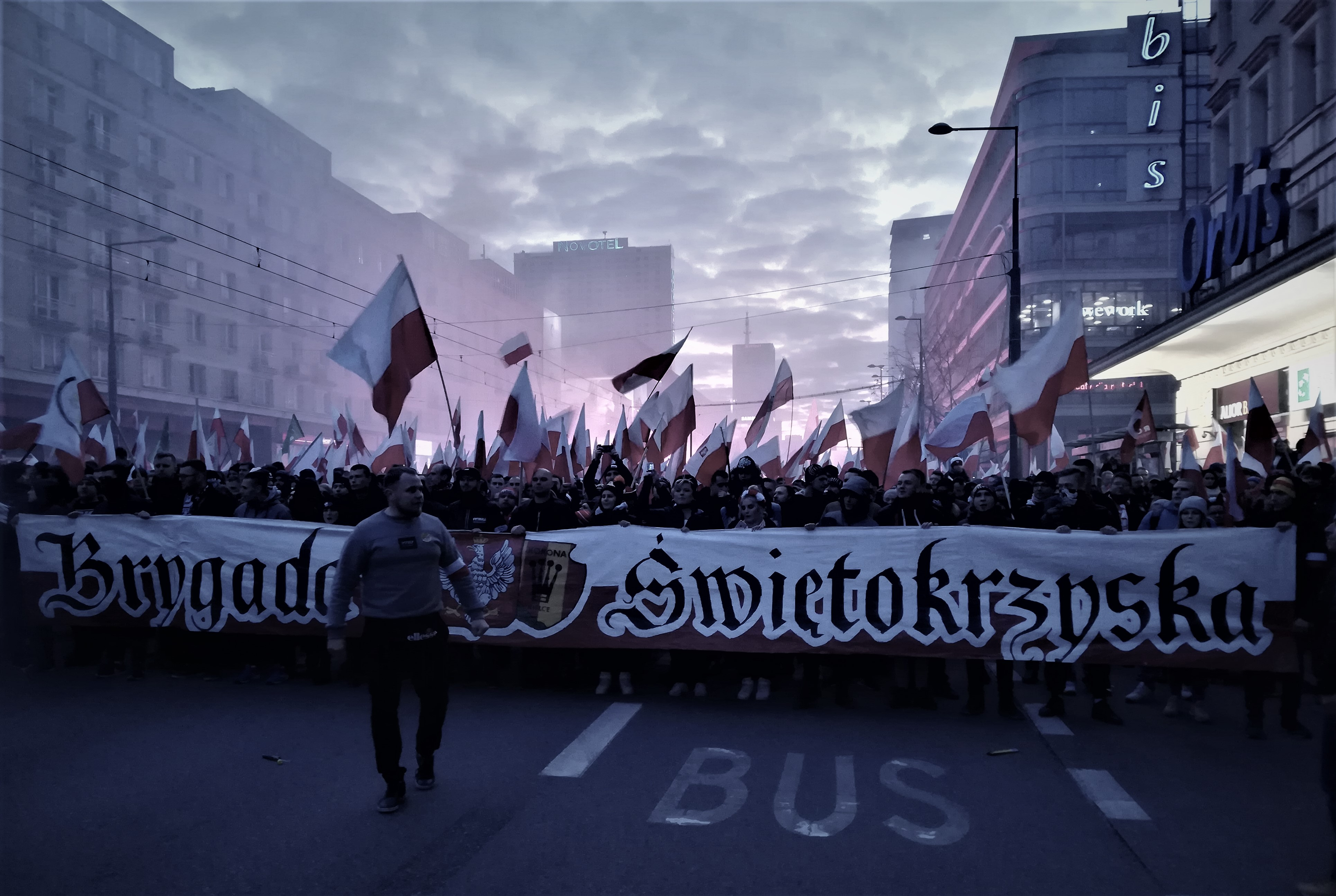
Polish far-right nationalists pay tribute to the Brigade during Independence March, 2019

Sejm member and chair of the Together Party Adrian Zandberg criticized Law and Justice Prime Minister Mateusz Morawiecki for "commemorat[ing] a unit that openly collaborated with the Gestapo" for paying tribute to the Holy Cross Mountains Brigade and said Hubert Jura may be a hero to Morawiecki, but not to him.

In 2019, the children of Home Army officers wrote an open letter to Polish President Andrzej Duda.

They wrote:

"Tom" collaborated with Radom Gestapo Commander Paul Fuchs from 1943 on the liquidation of communists and "other criminals." He managed to escape with his life from an assassination attempt carried out after being sentenced to death by the Special Military Court.

We don't understand how it's possible to honor the anniversary of the founding of a collaborationist armed formation, which signifies approval of its goals and methods of combat, and at the same time extend patronage to an event as important for the reborn Poland as the Battle of Warsaw. You have given equal rank to both patronages – the National Patronage.

We are outraged by this fact: the Battle of Warsaw is a symbol of the salvation of the young state, while the creation of the Holy Cross Brigade is a symbol of the division of Poland.

== See also ==
- Detached Unit of the Polish Army (operating in the same region several years earlier)
- National Armed Forces
