= Władysław Tatarkiewicz =

Polish philosopher (1886–1980)

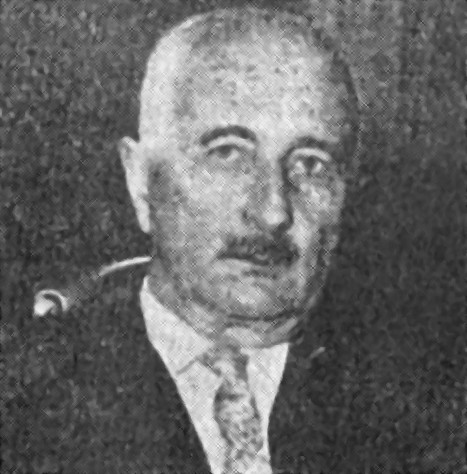
- Władysław Tatarkiewicz c. 1960
- Born: April 3, 1886; Warsaw, Congress Poland, Russian Empire
- Died: April 4, 1980 (aged 94); Warsaw, Polish People's Republic

Education
- Education: Marburg University
- Thesis: Die Disposition der aristotelischen Prinzipien (1909)
- Doctoral advisor: Paul Natorp

Philosophical work
- Era: 20th-century philosophy
- Region: Western philosophy
- School: Lwów–Warsaw school of logic
- Doctoral students: Jan Mosdorf
- Main interests: aesthetics, ethics, history of art, history of philosophy

Władysław Tatarkiewicz (Polish: [vwaˈdɨswaf tatarˈkʲevitʂ]; 3 April 1886 – 4 April 1980) was a Polish philosopher, historian of philosophy, historian of art, esthetician, and ethicist.

== Early life and education ==
Tatarkiewicz was a grandson of the sculptor Jakub Tatarkiewicz, whose Frankist Jewish family had converted to Christianity. From 1903 he studied law at the Imperial University of Warsaw. In 1905 he was expelled by the Russian authorities with a "wolf's ticket" for having participated in a student assembly demanding the Polonization of the university. He moved to the University of Zurich, then in 1906 to Humboldt University of Berlin, and in 1907 to Marburg University, where in late 1909 he completed his thesis on Aristotle under the supervision of Paul Natorp and in 1910 was awarded a doctorate in philosophy.

== Career ==
As he describes in his Memoirs, it was a chance encounter with a male relative, whose height made him stand out above the crowd at a Kraków railroad station, upon the outbreak of World War I that led Tatarkiewicz to spend the war years in Warsaw. There he began his career as a lecturer in philosophy, teaching at a girls' school on Mokotowska Street, across the street from where Józef Piłsudski was to reside during his first days after World War I.

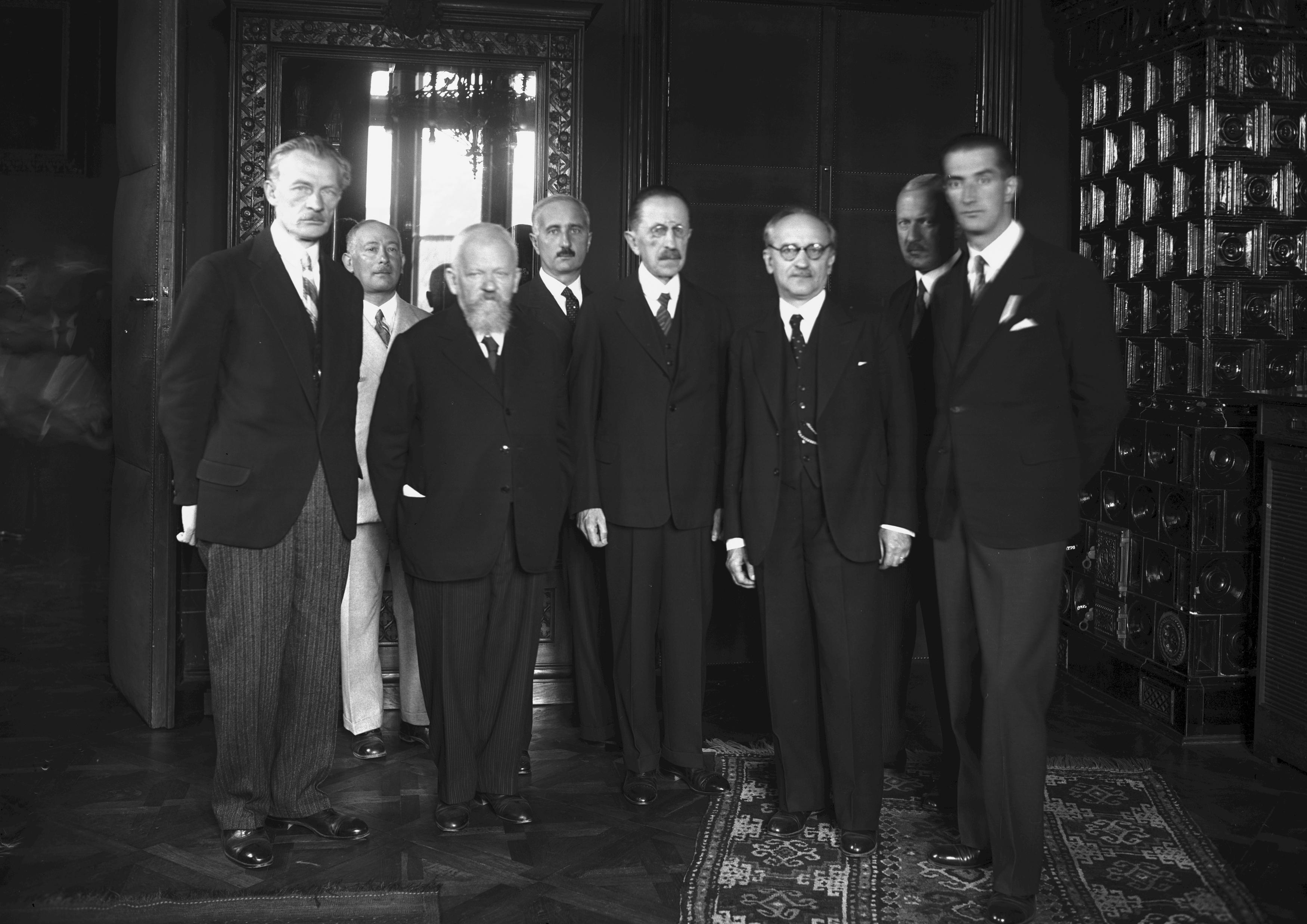
Tatarkiewicz (4th from left), 3rd Philosophers' Conference, Kraków, September 1936

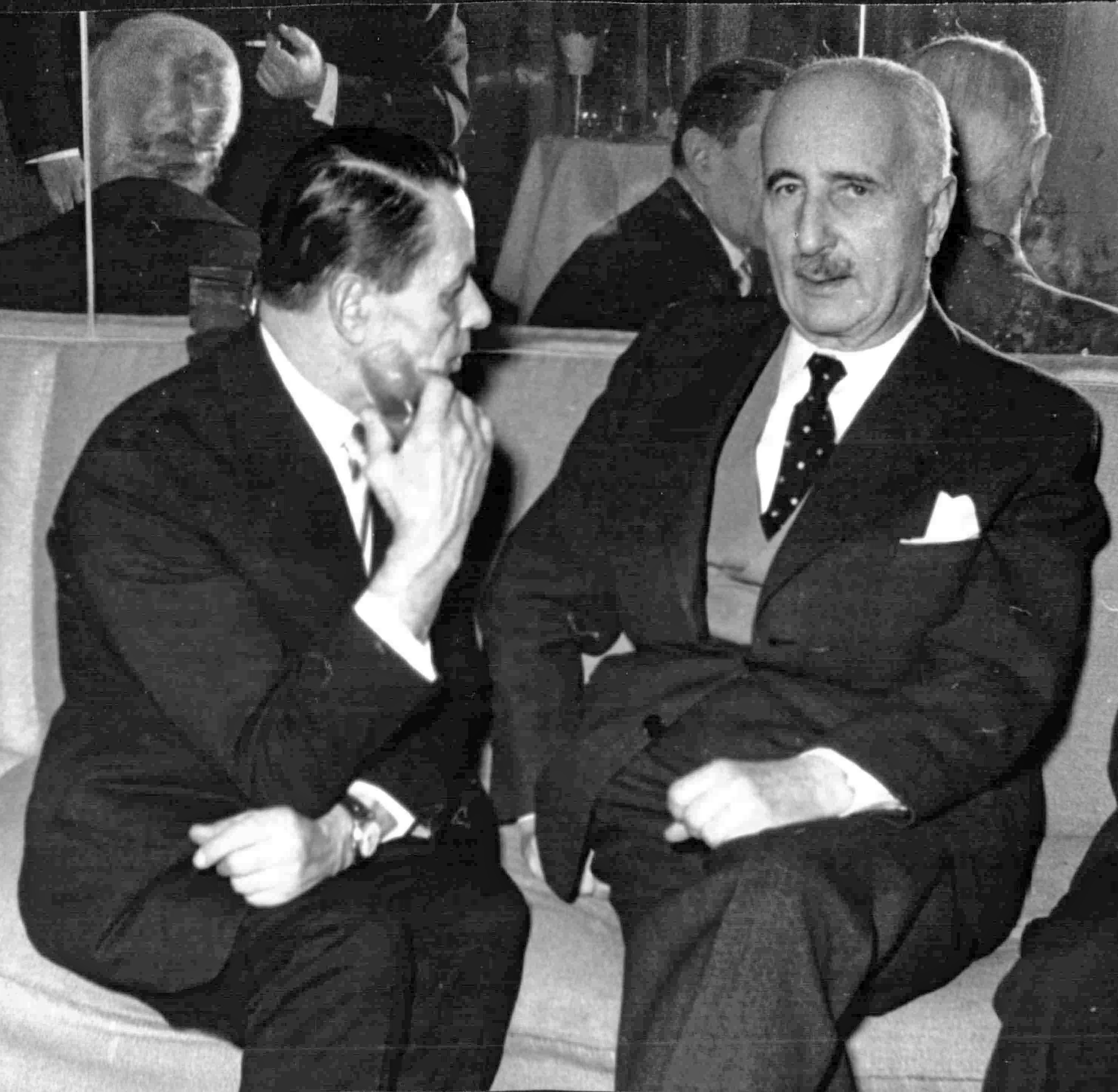
Władysław Tatarkiewicz (right) and Armand Vetulani, ca 1960

During World War I, when the Polish University of Warsaw was opened under the sponsorship of the occupying Germans – who wanted to win Polish support for their war effort – Tatarkiewicz directed its philosophy department in 1915–19.

In 1919–21 he was professor at Stefan Batory University in Wilno, in 1921–23 at the University of Poznań, and in 1923–61 again at the University of Warsaw. In 1930 he became a member of the Polish Academy of Learning. He supervised the 1928 master's thesis and the 1934 doctoral thesis of the National Radical Camp leader Jan Mosdorf, who became his leading student.

During World War II, risking his life, he conducted underground lectures in German-occupied Warsaw (one of the audience members was Czesław Miłosz). After the suppression of the Warsaw Uprising (August–October 1944) he again consciously risked his life when retrieving a manuscript from the gutter, where a German soldier had hurled it (this and other materials were later published as a book, in English translation titled Analysis of Happiness).

After World War II, he taught at the University of Warsaw. In March 1950 Tatarkiewicz was demoted and banned from teaching after seven of his students (including Henryk Holland and Leszek Kołakowski), who were activists in the Polish United Workers' Party, presented a "Letter of 7" which denounced him for "privileging 'objective-bourgois' science instead of Marxist engagement" and opposing "the construction of socialism in Poland".

Władysław Tatarkiewicz died the day after his 94th birthday. In his Memoirs, published shortly before, he recalled having been ousted from his University chair (by Henryk Holland, a politically connected former student). Characteristically, he saw even that indignity as a blessing in disguise, as it gave him freedom from academic duties, and leisure to pursue research and writing.

And in sum it is a good existence: that of a retired old professor. He still has something to do, but is under no compulsion. He only voluntarily imposes compulsions on himself. He has time: at any time of day, he can go for a walk in the park—as long as his legs will still carry him. Equally, or even more, important is this: he no longer has ambition, he has ceased to be a rival to others. He is no inconvenience to others, they have no need to fear him, they have no reason to envy him: in this situation—without opponents, rivals and enemies—life is considerably more tolerable.

Tatarkiewicz reflected that at all crucial junctures of his life, he had failed to foresee events, many of them tragic, but that this had probably been for the better, since he could not have altered them anyway.

== View on happiness ==
Tatarkiewicz believed that "satisfaction with particular things... is only partial satisfaction; happiness requires total satisfaction, that is, satisfaction with life as a whole."

== Major works ==
Tatarkiewicz belonged to the interwar Lwów–Warsaw school of logic, created by Kazimierz Twardowski, which gave reborn Poland many scholars and scientists: philosophers, logicians, psychologists, sociologists, and organizers of academia.

Tatarkiewicz educated generations of Polish philosophers, estheticians and art historians, as well as a multitude of interested laymen. He posthumously continues to do so through his History of Philosophy and numerous other works.

In his final years, Tatarkiewicz devoted considerable attention to securing translations of his major works. Of the below incomplete listing of his works, his 1909 German-language doctoral thesis, and his History of Philosophy, Łazienki warszawskie, Parerga, and Memoirs have not been translated into English.

- Die Disposition der aristotelischen Principien (German: Aristotle's System of Concepts): Tatarkiewicz's 1909 doctoral thesis, published 1910. First Polish-language edition: Układ pojęć w filozofii Arystotelesa (The System of Concepts in Aristotle's Philosophy), translated from the German by Izydora Dąmbska, Warsaw, Państwowe Wydawnictwo Naukowe, 1978, 126 pp.
- History of Philosophy, three volumes (Polish: Historia filozofii, vols. 1-2, 8th ed. 1978; vol. 3, 5th ed. 1978).
- History of Aesthetics, three volumes (vols. 1-2, 1970; vol. 3, 1974). (Polish: Historia estetyki, vols. 1-2, 1962; vol. 3, 1967.)
- Analysis of Happiness, 1976, ISBN 90 247 1807 4. (Polish: O Szczęściu [On Happiness], 1962; 7th ed., 1979, ISBN 83-01-00114-3.)
- Łazienki warszawskie (Warsaw's Royal Baths Park), with photographs by Edmund Kupiecki, Warsaw, Wydawnictwo Arkady, 1968, 299 pp. A study of the aesthetics of what Tatarkiewicz identified as the "style of [Poland's last king] Stanisław August", as manifested in the structures and grounds of Warsaw's Royal Baths Park.
- A History of Six [aesthetic] Ideas, 1980, ISBN 83-01-00824-5. (Polish: Dzieje sześciu pojęć, 2nd ed. 1976.)
- Parerga (By-Works), Warsaw, Państwowe Wydawnictwo Naukowe, 1978, 141 pp. Polish language. Chapters:

- "Two Concepts of Beauty"
- "Two Concepts of Poetry" ("The Concept of Poetry", translated by Christopher Kasparek, Dialectics and Humanism: The Polish Philosophical Quarterly, vol. II, no. 2 (spring 1975), pp. 13–24)
- "Creation and Discovery"
- "The Concept of Value"
- "Civilization and Culture"
- "Art and Technology"
- "Integration of the Arts"
- "Photographs and Pictures"
- "Tragedy and the Tragic"
- "The Great and the Close"

- On Perfection (Polish: O doskonałości, 1976). English translation by Christopher Kasparek was serialized in Dialectics and Humanism: the Polish Philosophical Quarterly, vol. VI, no. 4 [autumn 1979] — vol. VIII, no. 2 [spring 1981]. Kasparek's translation has subsequently also appeared in the book: Władysław Tatarkiewicz, On perfection, Warsaw University Press, Center of Universalism, 1992, pp. 9–51; the book is a collection of papers by and about the late Professor Tatarkiewicz.
- Memoirs (Polish: Wspomnienia, 1979).

== See also ==
- History of philosophy in Poland
- History of the concept of creativity
- List of Poles
- Perfection
- Wincenty Lutosławski
