= Perfection =

State of completeness, flawlessness, or supreme excellence

A perfectly black body; and a perfect circle

Perfection is a state, variously, of completeness, flawlessness, or supreme excellence.

The term designates a range of diverse, if often kindred, concepts used in a variety of fields.

== Term and concept ==
The noun "perfection", the adjective "perfect", and the verb "to perfect" derive from the Latin verb "perficere" – "to finish" or "to bring to an end".

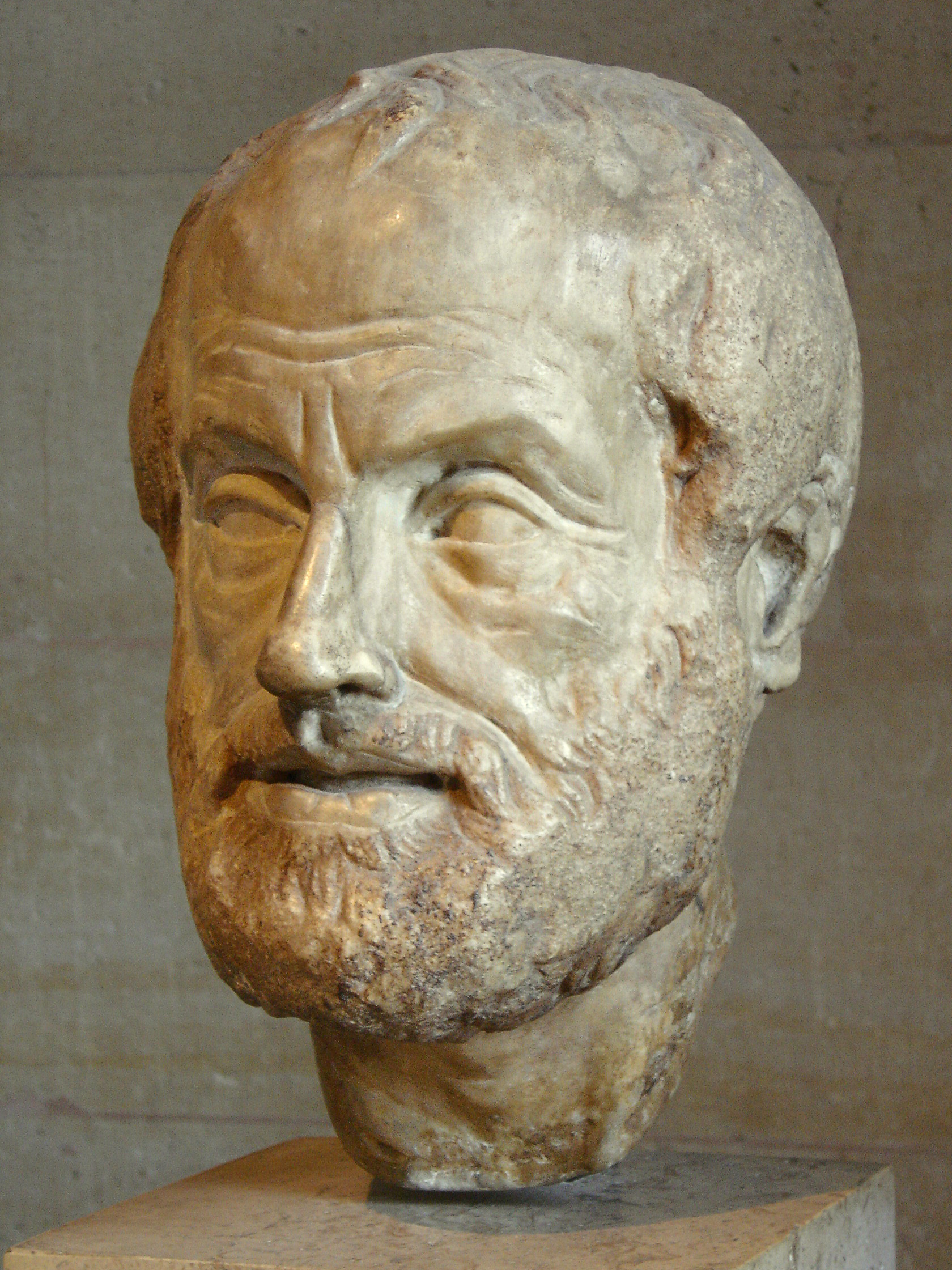
Aristotle

The ancient Greek word for "perfection" was "teleiotes".

The Greek polymath Aristotle (384–322 BCE) distinguished three concepts of perfection:

1. that which was complete – which contained all the requisite parts;
2. that which was so good that nothing of the kind could be better;
3. that which had attained its purpose.

The Polish philosopher Władysław Tatarkiewicz (1886 – 1980) notes that perfection is often confused with other qualities, such as "excellence". The German polymath Leibniz (1646–1716), who thought the world to be the best of all possible worlds, never called it perfect.

== Paradox ==
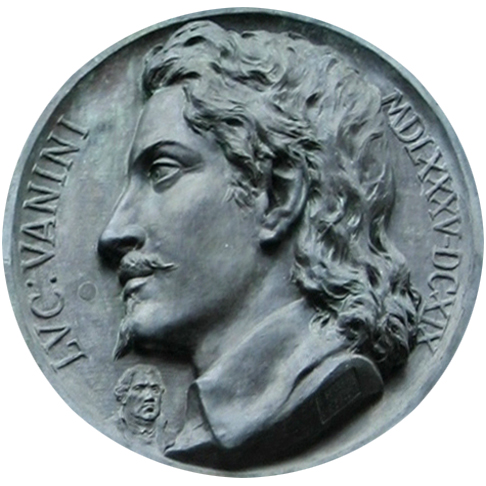
Vanini

The Franco-Italian scholar Joseph Juste Scaliger (1540–1609), the Italian polymath Lucilio Vanini (1585–1619), and (according to Vanini) the Greek philosopher Empedocles (ca. 494 – ca. 434 BCE) held that the greatest perfection was imperfection, for if the world were perfect, it could not be further perfected.

This idea accorded with the Baroque aesthetic of Vanini and the French polymath Marin Mersenne (1588–1648): the perfection of an art work occurs when the spectator complements the work with an act of contemplation.

== Perfect numbers ==
The ancient Greeks called perfect numbers "teleioi". A variety of numbers have been called "perfect", for example the number 10 (a person's hands have 10 fingers).

Greek mathematicians regarded as "perfect" a number which equals the sum of its divisors that are smaller than itself, such as the number 6, because 1 + 2 + 3 = 6. (Note: "Perfect numbers" are also called "Mersenne numbers", after Marin Mersenne, who studied them in the early 17th century.)

Euclid (fl. 300 BCE) gave a formula for (even) "perfect" numbers:

N_{p} = 2^{p−1} (2^{p} − 1)

where p and 2^{p} − 1 are prime numbers.

After more than two millennia of study, it still is not known whether there exist infinitely many perfect numbers; or whether there are any odd ones.

== Physics ==
A number of fictitious physical entities are traditionally called "perfect":

A perfectly rigid body is one that supposedly is not deformed by forces applied to it.

A perfectly plastic body is one that is supposedly deformed indefinitely as a load is applied to it.

A perfectly black body would be one that absorbed, completely, radiation falling upon it.

A perfect fluid would be one that is incompressible and non-viscous.

A perfect gas would be one whose molecules did not interact with each other and had no volume of their own.

All these are fictitious ideals that do not exist in nature. They are useful insofar as they set physical extremes which nature can only approach asymptotically.

== Ethics ==
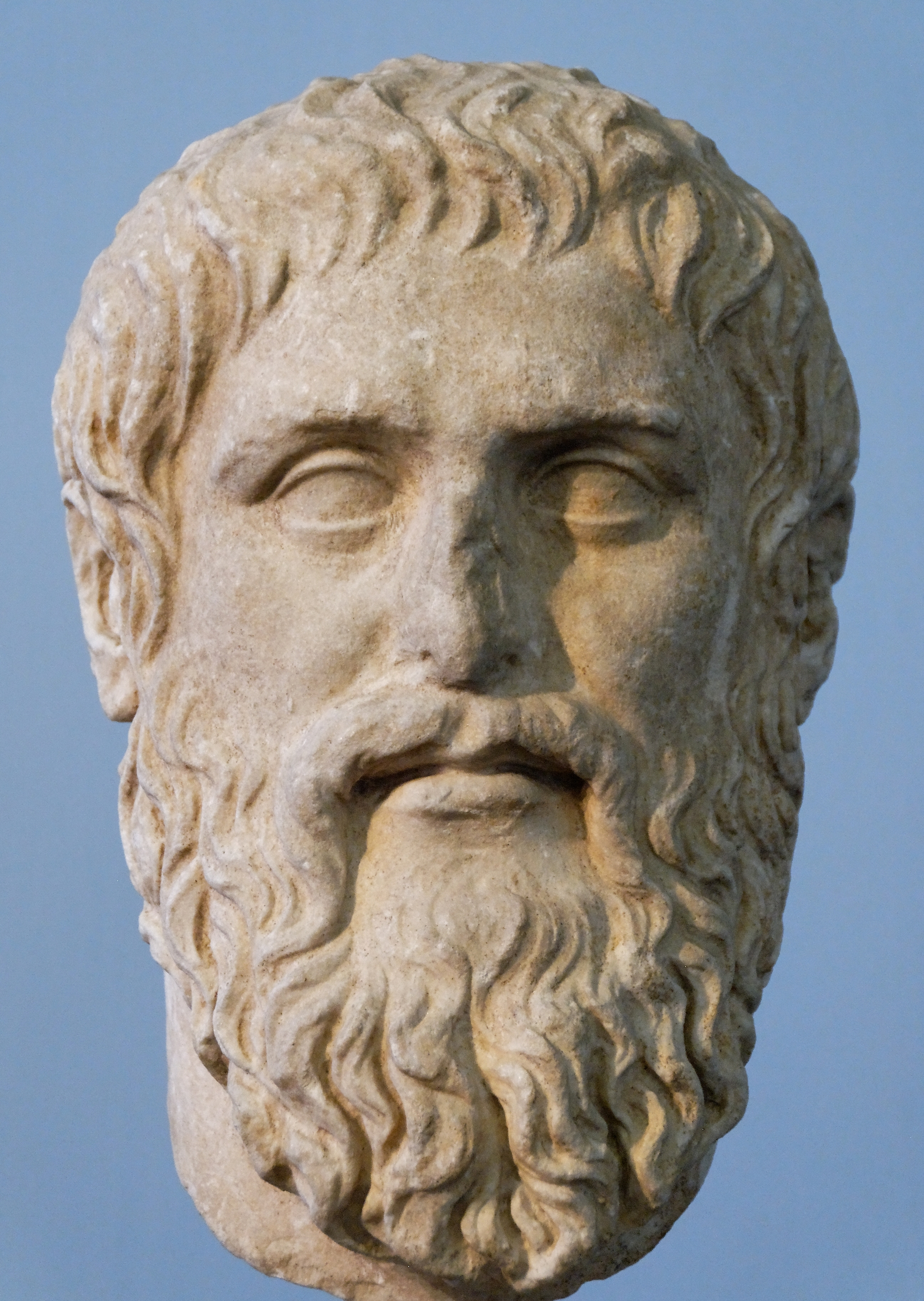
Plato

The ancient Greek philosopher Plato (born ca. 428–423 BCE, died ca. 347 BCE) seldom used the term "perfection", but the concept of "the good", central to his philosophy, was tantamount to "perfection".

Christianity embraced the ideal of perfection. Matthew 5:48 enjoined: "Be ye therefore perfect, even as your Father which is in heaven is perfect."

Saint Augustine (354 – 430), a Roman North African, wrote that not only that man is properly termed perfect and without blemish who is already perfect, but also he who strives unreservedly after perfection.

Some Bible voices cast doubt on whether perfection is attainable by man. 1 John 1:8 says: "If we say that we have no sin, we deceive ourselves, and the truth is not in us."

As early as the 5th century, two distinct views on perfection had emerged within the Church: that perfection was attainable by man on earth by his own powers; and, that it may come only by special divine grace.

The 14th century saw, with the Scotists, (Note: Scotists: a philosophical school and theological system named after Scottish philosopher-theologian John Duns Scotus (ca. 1265/66 – 1308).) a shift in interest from moral to ontological perfection. The 15th century, particularly during the Italian Renaissance, saw a shift to artistic perfection.

The second half of the 16th century brought the Counter-Reformation, the Council of Trent, and heroic attempts to attain perfection through contemplation and mortification of the flesh.

The first half of the 17th century saw the beginnings of Jansenism and a growing belief in predestination and in the impossibility of perfection without divine grace.

The 18th century and the Enlightenment brought a sea change to the idea of moral perfection, from religious to secular. The perfect man was he who lived in harmony with nature.

The mid-18th century saw a brief retreat from the idea of perfection, when the French Encyclopédie entry on "Perfection" discussed only technological perfection – the optimal matching of human handiworks to the tasks set for them; no mention was made of moral, aesthetic, or ontological perfection.

The 18th century otherwise saw declarations about the coming perfection of man from Immanuel Kant (1724 – 1804) and Johann Gottfried von Herder (1744 – 1803).

Other writers, of this and following periods, who expected perfection to come about via secular processes included David Hume, John Locke, David Hartley, Claude Adrien Helvétius, Jeremy Bentham, Charles Fourier, Francis Galton, Johann Gottlieb Fichte, Georg Wilhelm Friedrich Hegel, and the 19th-century positivists and evolutionists including the polymath Herbert Spencer.

From the 20th century, writes Tatarkiewicz, the goal has been not so much perfection as improvement aimed at attaining excellence.

== Aesthetics ==
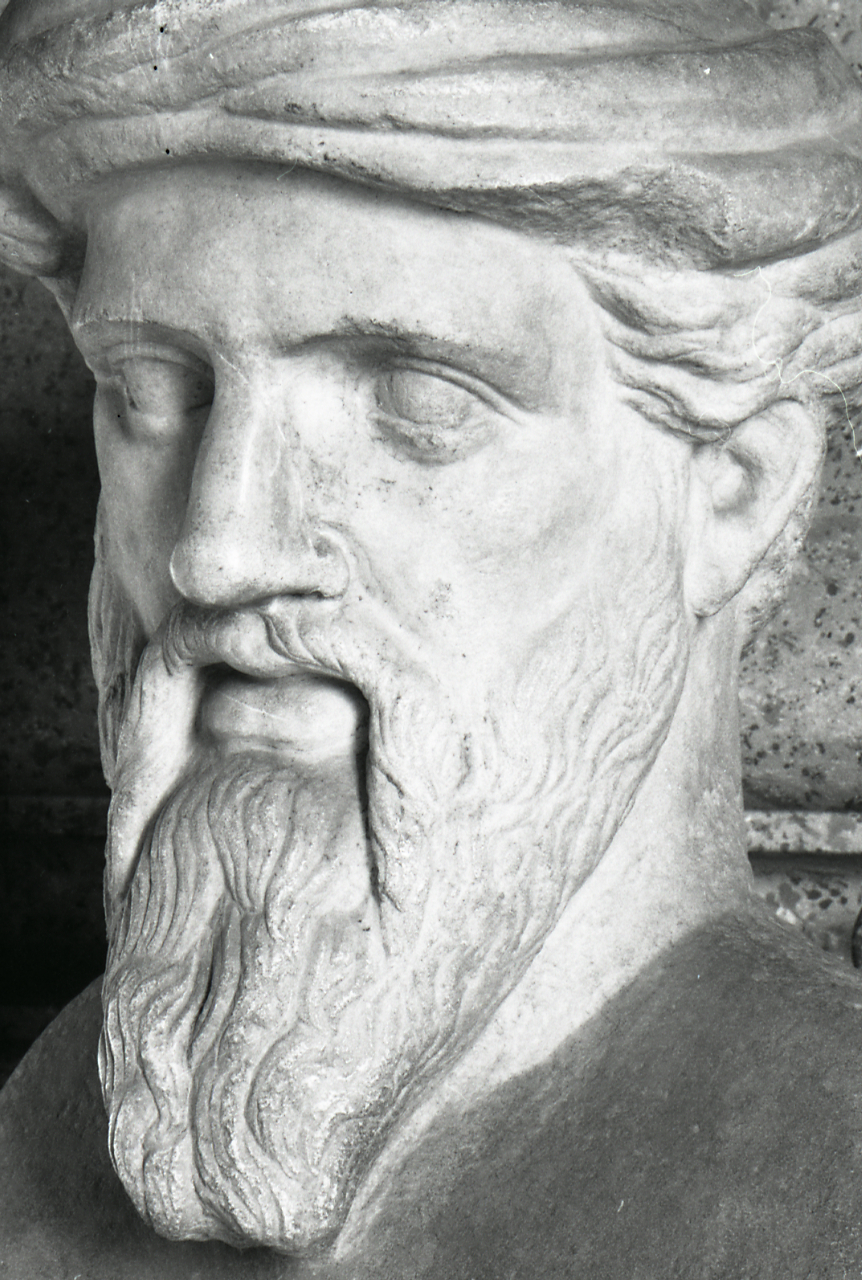
Pythagoras

In ancient Greece, the 6th-century BCE Pythagoreans held that perfection in beauty and art consisted in correct proportions and in a harmonious arrangement of parts. For Plato, in the 5th and 4th centuries BCE, beauty and perfection were one. The views of these Greeks dictated that, for every art, there was but one perfect form.

There was also a common belief that certain proportions and shapes were perfect in themselves. Plato felt that the most perfect proportion was the ratio of the side to the diagonal of a square.

Aristotle (384–322 BCE) regarded the circle as the perfect, most beautiful form. Roman politician and orator Cicero (106 – 43 BCE) wrote: "Two forms are the most distinctive: of solids, the sphere ... and of plane figures, the circle..."

Renaissance aesthetics placed less emphasis than had classical aesthetics on the unity of things perfect. Italian courtier Baldassare Castiglione (1478 – 1529), in his Courtier, wrote of Leonardo, Andrea Mantegna, Raphael, Michelangelo, and Giorgione, that "each of them is unlike the others, but each is the most perfect in his style."

Perfection gradually came to be seen as but one of many admirable qualities. Italian Renaissance scholar Cesare Ripa (ca. 1555 – 1622), in his Iconologia, placed perfezione on an equal footing with grace (grazia), prettiness (venustà), and beauty (bellezza).

Still, Leibniz's pupil Christian Wolff (1679 – 1754) wrote in his Psychology that beauty consisted in perfection and that this was the reason why beauty was a source of pleasure. No such general aesthetic theory, explicitly naming perfection – writes Tatarkiewicz – had ever been formulated by any of perfection's devotees from Plato to Italian Renaissance architect Andrea Palladio (1508 – 1580).

Wolff's theory of beauty-as-perfection was elaborated by the school's chief aesthetician, Alexander Gottlieb Baumgarten (1714 – 1762). Gotthold Ephraim Lessing (1729 – 1781) considered both beauty and sublimity to be ideas of perfection.

Immanuel Kant (1724 – 1804) wrote much about perfection in his Critique of Judgment, but in the realm of aesthetics he concluded: "The faculty of taste is entirely independent of the concept of perfection".

Earlier in the 18th century, France's leading aesthetician, Encyclopédie editor Denis Diderot (1713 – 1784), had expelled the concept of perfection from aesthetics. Jean-Jacques Rousseau (1712 – 1778) had treated perfection as an unreal concept and had written to the polymath and Encyclopédie co-editor Jean le Rond d'Alembert (1717 – 1783) : "Let us not seek the chimera of perfection..."

In England, in 1757, aesthetician Edmund Burke (1729 – 1797) too had denied that perfection was the cause of beauty.

In the 19th century, perfection ceased to be a leading concept in aesthetics. French dramatist, poet, and novelist Alfred de Musset (1810 – 1857) held that "Perfection is no more attainable for us than infinity."

In the 20th century, French poet and philosopher Paul Valéry (1871 – 1945) saw perfection as an impracticable goal.

== Ontology and theology ==
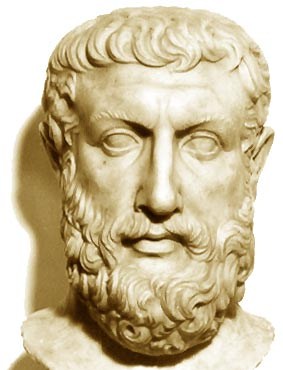
Parmenides

The Greek philosopher Anaximander (ca. 610 – ca. 546 BCE) described the world as "endless". Xenophanes (ca. 570 – ca. 478 BCE) declared it "the greatest". But they did not regard it as perfect.

Parmenides (fl. in the late-6th or early-5th century BCE), however, considered being (existence) to be "tetelesmenon" ("finished"); and Melissus of Samos (fl. in the 5th century BCE), his successor in the Eleatic school, said that being (existence) "is entirely" ("pan esti"). Thus both saw perfection in being (existence). Parmenides moreover thought the world to be finite, limited in all directions, and like a sphere – which was a mark of its perfection.

Parmenides' view was embraced to some extent by Plato (late-5th to mid-4th century BCE), who thought that the world was the work of a good Demiurge, and that this was why order and harmony prevailed in it. Plato believed that the world was the best, the most beautiful, perfect; and that it had a perfect shape (spherical) and a perfect motion (circular).

But Plato said nothing about the Demiurge himself being perfect. Perfection implied limits; whereas it was the world, not the Demiurge, that had limits.

A similar view was expressed by Aristotle (384–322 BCE), who held the world's primum movens, or "first cause", to be pure form, pure energy, pure reason – features which were superior to all else. The first cause had the highest attributes, but perfection was not one of them.

However, the pantheist Stoics – Greek and Roman followers of Zeno of Citium, Cyprus (ca. 334 – ca. 262 BCE) – thought the divinity to be perfect, precisely because, as pantheists, they identified it with the world.

Roman politician and orator Cicero (106 – 43 BCE) wrote in De natura deorum (On the Nature of the Gods) that the world "encompasses ... all beings [existences]... And what could be more absurd than denying perfection to an all-embracing being [existence]?..."

Eventually Greek philosophy became bound up with the Christian religion – the concept of first cause, with the concept of God the Creator. Christian theology united the features of the first cause in Aristotle's Metaphysics with the features of the Creator in the Book of Genesis. But the attributes of God did not include perfection, for a perfect being must be finite.

Another reason to deny perfection to God originated in a branch of Christian theology that was influenced by a Greek Platonist, Plotinus (204/5 – 270 CE): The absolute from which the world derived could not be grasped in terms of human concepts. Not only was that absolute not matter, it was not spirit either, nor idea. it was incomprehensible and ineffable; it was beyond all that we may imagine, including perfection.

Italian Scholastic Thomas Aquinas (ca. 1225 – 1274), indicating that he was following Aristotle, defined a perfect thing as one that "possesses that of which, by its nature, it is capable." There were, in the world, things perfect and imperfect, more perfect and less perfect. God permitted imperfections in Creation when they were necessary for the good of the whole. It was natural for man to go by degrees from imperfection to perfection.

To Duns Scotus (ca. 1265/66 – 1308), perfection was not an attribute of God but a property of Creation, and all things partook of perfection to a greater or lesser degree. A thing's perfection depended on what sort of perfection it was eligible for; and that was perfect which had attained the fullness of the qualities possible for it. Hence "whole" and "perfect" meant more or less the same.

This, notes Tatarkiewicz, was a teleological concept, for it implied a "telos" (an end – a goal or purpose). God created things that served certain purposes – created even those purposes – but He himself did not serve a purpose. Since God was not finite, He could not be called perfect: for the concept of perfection served to describe finite things. Perfection was not a theological concept, but an ontological one, writes Tatarkiewicz, because it was a feature, in some degree, of every being (existence).

The concept of perfection, as an attribute of God, entered theology only in modern times, through French philosopher, scientist, and mathematician René Descartes (1596 – 1650).

Leibniz (1646 – 1716) wrote: "As Descartes states, existence itself is perfection." Leibniz also construed perfection in a different way in his Monadology: "Only that is perfect which possesses no limits – that is, only God."

Leibniz's pupil and successor, Christian Wolff (1679 – 1754), however, ascribed perfection not to existence as a whole, but once again to its individual constituents. He gave, as examples, an eye that sees faultlessly, and a watch that runs faultlessly.

Wolff's pupil Alexander Gottlieb Baumgarten (1714 – 1762) derived perfection from rules, but anticipated their "collisions" leading to exceptions and limiting the perfection of things. Eventually he arrived at the conclusion that "everything is perfect".

Tatarkiewicz writes that Wolff and his pupils had returned to the ontological concept of perfection that the Scholastics had used; and that the theological concept of perfection had lasted only from Descartes to Leibniz, in the 17th century.

Thanks to Wolff's school, the concept of perfection endured in Germany through the 18th century. In other western countries, especially France and Britain, the concept was already in decline and was ignored by the French Encyclopédie.

In Christian Wolff's school, perfection was an essential property of every thing, without which the thing cannot exist. "This", says Tatarkiewicz, "was a singular moment in the history of the ontological concept of perfection; soon thereafter, that history came to an end."

== See also ==
- Christian perfection
- Perfect competition
- Perfect fifth
- Perfect flower (bisexual flower)
- Perfect fourth
- Perfect pitch
- Perfection (law)
- Perfectionism (philosophy)
- Perfectionism (psychology)
- Three perfections (Chinese art)

== Sources ==
- Bolesław Prus, On Discoveries and Inventions: A Public Lecture Delivered on 23 March 1873.
- Władysław Tatarkiewicz, O doskonałości (On Perfection), Warsaw, Państwowe Wydawnictwo Naukowe, 1976.
  - An English translation of Tatarkiewicz's book, by Christopher Kasparek, was serialized in Dialectics and Humanism: the Polish Philosophical Quarterly, vol. VI, no. 4 (autumn 1979), pp. 5–10; vol. VII, no. 1 (winter 1980), pp. 77–80; vol. VII, no. 2 (spring 1980), pp. 137–39; vol. VII, no. 3 (summer 1980), pp. 117–24; vol. VII, no. 4 (autumn 1980), pp. 145–53; vol. VIII, no. 1 (winter 1981), pp. 187–92; and vol. VIII, no. 2 (spring 1981), pp. 11–12.
- Teresa Tyszkiewicz, Bolesław Prus, Warsaw, Państwowe Zakłady Wydawnictw Szkolnych, 1971.
