= Jan Mosdorf =

Polish politician (1904–1943)

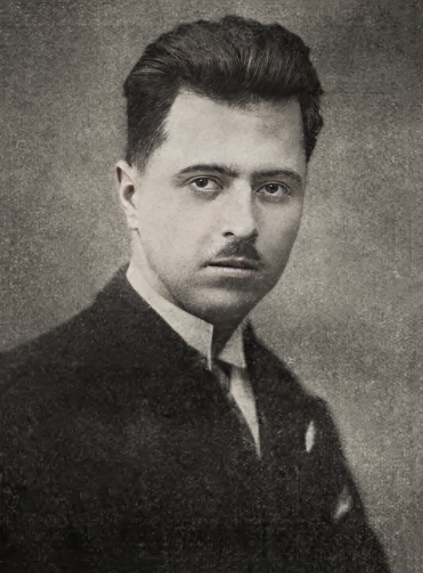

Personal details
- Born: 30 May 1904 Warsaw, Kingdom of Poland
- Died: 11 October 1943 (aged 39) Oświęcim, General Government
- Resting place: Powązki Cemetery, Warsaw (symbolic grave)
- Party: Camp of Great Poland (1926–1933); National Party (1933–1934, 1939–1943); National Radical Camp (1934)
- Education: University of Warsaw
- Occupation: Politician; publicist; philosopher; ideologue
- Nickname: Andrzej Witkowski

Jan Mosdorf (30 May 1904 – 11 October 1943), was a Polish right-wing politician, director of the nationalist organization All-Polish Youth (Młodzież Wszechpolska, MW) and member of the far-right political party National Radical Camp (ONR). He also worked as a publicist, using the pseudonym Andrzej Witkowski. In 1943, Mosdorf was killed in the Auschwitz concentration camp.

== Biography ==
Mosdorf was born in Warsaw. He associated himself with the National Democratic movement (founded by Roman Dmowski) some time in 1926. Two years later, he completed his philosophy studies, earning an M.A. degree (later, he also earned a PhD in philosophy, writing about works of Auguste Comte, under supervision of Prof. Władysław Tatarkiewicz). As a student, he was a member of several right-wing youth organizations. He wrote articles for nationalist magazines, always claiming that Germany was Poland's main enemy and that Poland should gain control over the Western part of Upper Silesia and Masuria.

In 1928, during the IV Congress of the MW, which took place in Lwów, he was elected director of the organization. He was one of the authors and signatories of the ONR's Ideological Declaration and its official leader. Later on, he had to hide for some time because he was a member of the ONR, and the government had incarcerated several activists of the organization in the Bereza Kartuska Prison. After coming out of hiding in 1935, he broke politically with the ONR and worked as a publicist for the weekly magazine Prosto z Mostu. In 1938, he published his most important work, Yesterday and Tomorrow (Polish: Wczoraj i jutro).

We [Polish nationalists] are not fascists, nor Hitlerites, for we are a native Polish movement, independent of foreign views. Additionally, we do not see ourselves as fascists or Nazis due to the many weaknesses, and even sins, these movements carry. These are not examples we would want to follow.- Jan Mosdorf "Wczoraj i Jutro", 1938

In late 1939, after the Polish September Campaign, he returned to the underground National Party. He was a member of the Central Propaganda Department of the SN Executive Board, participated in the publication and editing of the SN weekly magazine Struggle (Polish: Walka), and was active in National Military Organization (Polish: Narodowa Organizacja Wojskowa). In July 1940, Mosdorf was arrested and placed in Gestapo's infamous Pawiak prison. On 6 January 1941, he was sent to Auschwitz where he was given camp number 8230. While there, Mosdorf met his friend from ONR, Bolesław Świderski, whose support was crucial.

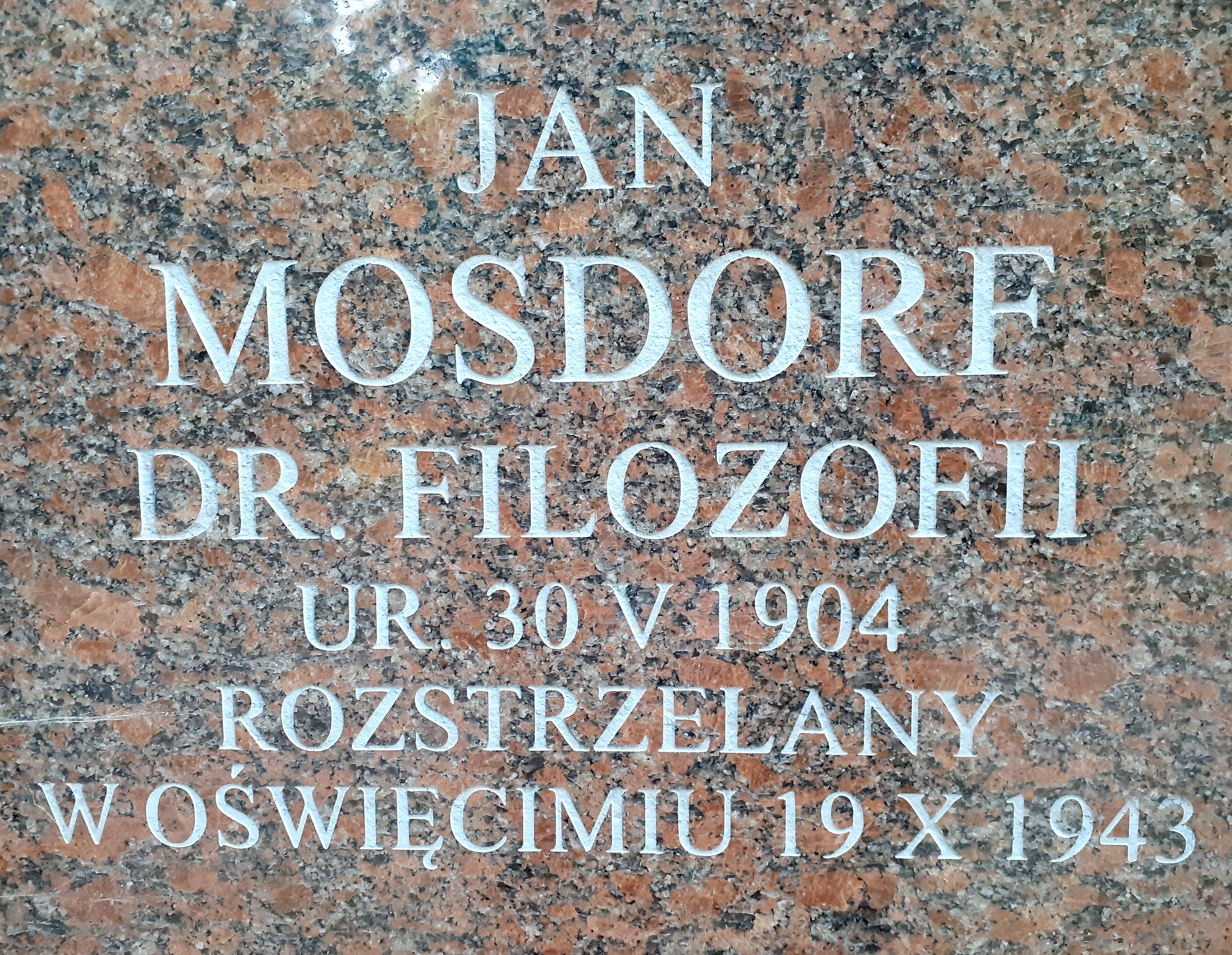
The symbolic grave of Jan Mosdorf at the Powązki Cemetery

Until then, Mosdorf had regarded Jews as enemies of Poland and the Polish nation. After surviving typhus, however, he changed his attitudes. Professor Irina Livezeanu from University of Pittsburgh wrote: "Mosdorf did everything in his power to help the Jews in the Auschwitz camp, and he died together with the Jews."

On 25 September 1943, Mosdorf was placed in the Pavilion XI, and on 11 October he was executed with a group of other inmates. His cenotaph is located at the Powązkowski Cemetery in Warsaw.

== Works ==
- Jan Mosdorf, "Wczoraj i Jutro", 1938 reprint Agencja Wydawniczo-Reklamowa "ARTE", 2005, ISBN 83-921586-0-1, ISBN 978-83-921586-0-8,
  - trad. Yesterday and Tomorrow: The European Spirit and the Polish Nation, Arktos, 362 p., 2025 ISBN 978-1917646826.

== Bibliography ==
- Mateusz Kotas, "Jan Mosdorf. Filozof, ideolog, polityk" - 2007 ISBN 978-83-60048-37-5
- Tadeusz Piotrowski, Poland's Holocaust, 1998
- Stefan Korboński, Jews Under Occupation, University of Pittsburgh
