= Henryk Rossman =

Polish lawyer and political activist (1896–1937)

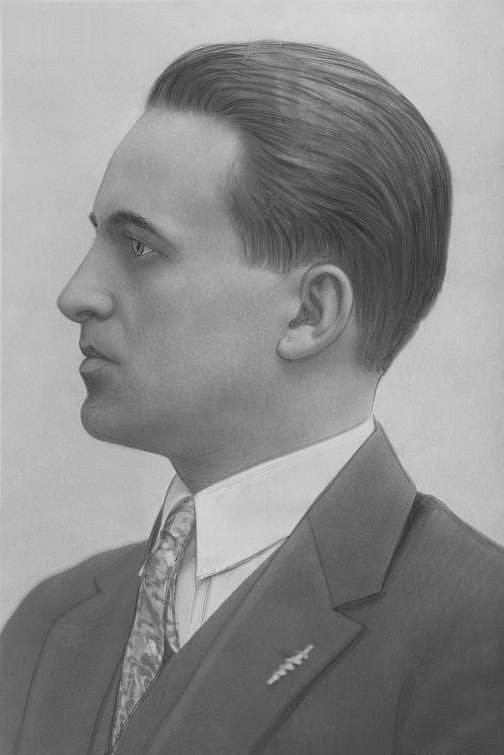
- Born: 24 December 1896
- Died: 24 February 1937 (aged 41)
- Occupations: lawyer, political activist
- Known for: inmate, Detention Camp Bereza Kartuska.
- Notable work: co-founder, National Radical Camp, ONR-ABC

Henryk Rossman (24 December 1896 – 23 February 1937) was a Polish lawyer and political activist of the nationalist movement, co-founder of the National Radical Camp and later splinter faction ONR-ABC. He was one of the inmates of Detention Camp Bereza Kartuska.

== Biography ==
He was the son of Kazimierz and Helena Maria (née Rodkiewicz). He was educated at home and later at a commercial school in Łódź. He became involved in the Scouting movement and completed his secondary school certificate (matura) at the Technical Institute in St. Gallen, Switzerland. From 1914 to 1915, he studied in Petrograd, where he obtained a Russian matura. Starting in 1915, he studied at the Faculty of Mechanical Engineering of the Warsaw University of Technology. He was a member of the National League. He interrupted his education due to the outbreak of the Polish–Soviet War, during which he served in the artillery, but he resumed his studies after the war ended.

In 1922, as a respected figure in the academic community, he became a member of the Supervisory Board of the Academic Association "All-Polish Youth". His talent and charisma were quickly noticed by Roman Dmowski himself, who appointed Rossman as his personal secretary. Over the following years, he was continuously active in various patriotic organizations, including the National Party and the Camp of Great Poland. He served as an organizer (Oboźny) for the Warsaw district and headed the secret "Organizacja Polska" (Polish Organization). He also belonged to the National Guard (Straż Narodowa), a secret internal structure within the National Party. In 1933, divisions began to emerge within these structures, and a year later, the National Radical Camp (ONR) was established. Rossman did not sign the ONR Declaration because he held the position of counsel to the American Bank. In March 1934, Henryk Rossman, along with Jan Mosdorf and M. Prószyński, were removed from their positions in the Youth Section of the National Party because they favored national-radical options. On July 6 of the same year, prominent ONR activists were imprisoned at the detention camp in Bereza Kartuska. Rossman was among them. The organization itself was banned due to legal regulations that prohibited the creation of intercollegiate organizations, as well as political activity by academic associations.

During their stay in the camp, ideological differences among the ONR activists became apparent. This led to a split into the "Falanga" faction, centered around Bolesław Piasecki, and the "ABC" faction, led by Henryk Rossman. His faction represented many older ONR activists who had signed the Declaration. Prominent figures of the ONR-ABC included: Jan Jodzewicz, Tadeusz Gluziński, Edward Kemnitz, Tadeusz Todtleben, Jerzy Kurcyusz, Jan Korolec, Aleksander Heinrich, Wiktor Martini, Witold Rościszewski, and Wincenty Malinowski. ONR-ABC had approximately 500 members. On January 6, 1935, the weekly magazine *Prosto z Mostu* was founded, edited by Stanisław Piasecki, which was ideologically aligned with the ONR-ABC faction.

The end of 1936 brought health troubles for Henryk Rossman, who suffered from kidney problems. According to some, these issues may have been caused by his imprisonment in Bereza Kartuska, where he was reportedly severely beaten on his back. He died in February 1937 as a result of uremia. Several thousand people attended his funeral procession, which went from the Church of the Holiest Saviour to the Stare Powązki Cemetery, where he was buried (plot 299a-4-1/2).
