= ONR =

ONR may refer to:

- Office for Nuclear Regulation in the United Kingdom
- Office of Naval Research of the U.S. Navy
- ONR (singer), stage name of Scottish singer Robert Shields
- Ontario Northland Railway in Ontario, Canada
- Organisation for National Reconstruction, a defunct political party in Trinidad and Tobago
- Otter Nelson River School, a high school in Manitoba, Canada
- Obóz Narodowo-Radykalny, three far-right fascist Polish nationalist organisations known as National Radical Camp
- ON-Regel, a standard by the Austrian Standards International
- ONR, the ICAO airline code for Air One Nine Company, Libya
