= Szaniec Group =

Group Szaniec (lit. Rampart Group, Polish: Grupa Szańca) was a far-right World War II Polish underground movement founded by the activists of the Obóz Narodowo-Radykalny ABC party (splinter of the National Radical Camp). Szaniec's military arm was the Military Organization Lizard Union.

Its notable activists included Tadeusz Salski.

Notably, the Szaniec Group did not recognize the Polish Underground State, and absorbed part of the National Armed Forces which refused to join Armia Krajowa in 1944. Early in the war, Szaniec Group fought the Nazi Germany occupiers. Near the end of the war, Szaniec Group saw the communists and the Soviet Union as more dangerous to future of Poland than Nazi Germany, and on a few occasions collaborated with the Germans against the Soviets (see for example the Holy Cross Mountains Brigade).
