= Hubert Jura =

Polish Army officer and Nazi collaborator

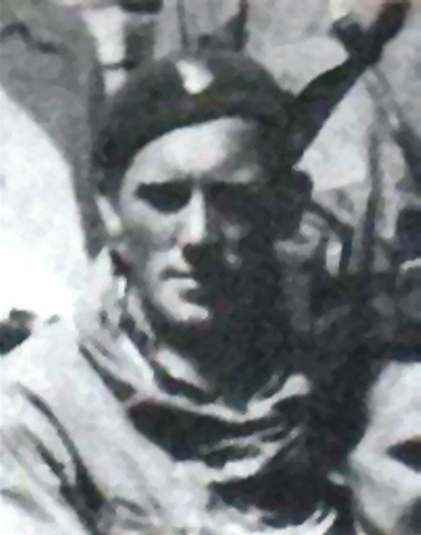
Hubert Jura

Hubert Jura (born 2 July 1916, date of death unknown), also known as Herbert Jung, was a Polish Army officer, resistance fighter and a Nazi collaborator (SD or Gestapo agent) who was sentenced to death by the Home Army.

== Biography ==
Jura was born in Tucheler Heide, German Empire on 2 July 1916. He was first an officer of the Polish Army, then of the underground Home Army which he left or from which he was removed after some of his crimes came to light, and subsequently a member of the nationalist National Armed Forces as well as his own organization. The organization he created, Tom’s Organization, collaborated with the Germans. Jura was sentenced to death by the Home Army underground court for his collaboration with Nazi Germany. Jura came from a Pomeranian mixed family with Polish and German roots. In 1943, after removing him from the Home Army, he set up his own intelligence organization (Tom's Organization). At the end of summer he started cooperation with the officer of the SS (and at the same time the Gestapo). The SS offered cooperation against the communists, in exchange for the supply of arms for "Tom Organization" and care during his travels between Warsaw and Radom. In 1944, after the fall of the Warsaw Uprising, members of the Tom Organization came to Częstochowa. “Tom" received a villa from the Germans at Jasnogórska Street, which became the headquarter of the group for a few months.

In 1944, a group of soldiers of the National Armed Forces commanded by Jura attacked the village of Petrykozy. According to the report from March 9, two Jews hiding there were murdered. After the war, Jura and former Gestapo member Paul Fuchs operated for the US intelligence network created to work in the newly established countries controlled by the Soviet Union. Later, Jura moved to Venezuela, and in 1993 to Argentina.
