= Wojciech Zaleski =

Polish right-wing politician

Wojciech Zaleski (1906 - 1961) was a Polish right-wing politician, co-founder of the National Radical Camp (1934), and activist of Confederation of the Nation.

Zaleski was born on 17 April 1906 in unknown location in Ukraine. He studied at Lwow University and Jagiellonian University, graduating in 1928. In 1931, at the age of 25, he was awarded the doctorate in law, and his field of expertise was economy. Zaleski wrote a number of articles about economy and society, his works were featured mostly in nationalistic press. In the late 1920s and early 1930s, he was an active member of the National Party (Poland). Disappointed with the party policies, on 14 April 1934 he co-founded the National Radical Camp (1934) (ONR), signing the historic Declaration of the ONR.

Since Zaleski was a renowned figure among Polish nationalists, he created economic program of the ONR. In 1937, he issued a manifesto “Poland Without Proletariat”, in which he wrote about the “third way”, beyond Capitalism and Communism. In 1938, he was named editor in chief of the popular right-wing daily ABC.

After the Invasion of Poland Zaleski was actively involved in the Polish resistance. He joined the radical organization Pobudka (Awakening), which in 1940 merged with some other groups, creating Confederation of the Nation (KN). Using nom de guerre Szarecki, he was one of leaders of the KN, responsible for propaganda. At the same time, he wrote for Polish underground press, publishing in 1942 a brochure “Economic Strength of New Poland” .

In final months of World War II, Zaleski escaped from Poland, avoiding possible NKVD arrest. In 1946, he became economic history lecturer at the UNRRA University in Munich, also publishing his own monthly Universum. In 1949, he wrote a book “Marshall Plan in the Economy of the Two Continents”, and in 1951 moved to Paris, where he was employed by the Economic Cooperation Administration. Zaleski remained a very active person: he was a member of the Centre of Research on Central Europe, and in 1952 wrote another book “The Party System”.

In 1954, Zaleski began cooperating with Polish language department of Radio Madrid. At the same time, he continued writing for several publications, such as Kultura, Horyzonty, Estudios Sobre el Communismo and Orientale Europea. Since Zaleski suffered from tuberculosis, he frequently had to visit different European spas. In 1961, his monumental book “A Thousand Years of Our Community. Social and Economic History of the Polish Nation” (“Tysiac lat naszej wspolnoty. Spoleczne i gospodarcze dzieje narodu polskiego w zarysie (Veritas, London 1961).

Wojciech Zaleski died on 23 October 1961 in Madrid, and was buried there.

== Sources ==
- Wojciech Zaleski, Muzeum ONR
