= Military Organization Lizard Union =

Far-right Polish WWII resistance group

Military Organization Lizard Union (1939-1942) National Armed Forces - Lizard Union (1944-1947)
- Organizacja Wojskowa Związek Jaszczurczy (1939-1942); Narodowe Siły Zbrojne - Związek Jaszczurczy (1944-1947)
- Emblem of the Lizard Union
- Founders: ONR-ABC; Szaniec Group
- Leader: Władysław Marcinkowski "Jaxa"
- Dates active: 14/15 October 1939 (as OW ZJ); March 1944 (as NSZ-ZJ)
- Country: Poland
- Allegiance: National Armed Forces
- Active regions: Warsaw; Mazovia; Kraków; Częstochowa; Białystok; Lublin
- Ideology: Polish nationalism; Anti-communism; Anti-German sentiment; Anti-Russian sentiment; Anti-Ukrainian sentiment; Antisemitism
- Size: 7,000–10,000 (estimated)
- Part of: ONR-ABC; Szaniec Group

Organizacja Wojskowa Związek Jaszczurczy (Military Organization Lizard Union, short form: Związek Jaszczurczy, abbreviated OW ZJ) was an organization of Polish resistance in World War II. Created in 1939 and transformed into National Armed Forces (Narodowe Siły Zbrojne, NSZ) in 1942, it represented the far right of the Polish political spectrum (related to the National Radical Camp (Obóz Narodowo-Radykalny, ONR) political party. It refused to recognise the broadly internationally recognised Polish Government-in-exile, although there was some uneasy tactical cooperation for practical reasons. It and descendants also refused to recognise the Soviet-aligned Polish Committee of National Liberation and continued to resist the new Polish communist regime and the USSR after the war.

== History ==
The organisation was created in October 1939 by Group Szaniec, itself originating from the far-right ONR-ABC, a faction of the National Radical Camp (Obóz Narodowo-Radykalny, ONR). On a structural level, it was subordinated to Organizacja Polska, a military department of ONR.

ONR-ABC did not support the mainstream Polish Underground State, related to the Polish government-in-exile and thus OW ZJ became an alternate Polish military, a counterweight to the ZWZ-AK of the Underground State. Perhaps ironically, the OW ZJ and its nemesis, the communist NKVD-controlled Gwardia Ludowa/Armia Ludowa, were the two major factions of Polish resistance that did not recognise the mainstream ZWZ-AK.

The Związek Jaszczurczy conducted intelligence and sabotage operations in the territory of Nazi occupied Poland as well as in and around Berlin, the Brandenburg area, München, Silesia, Bavaria, Westfalen, Ruhr Basin, Hamburg, Bremen, western and eastern Pomerania area including Königsberg, and Danzig. The eradication of the Związek Jaszczurczy became of such importance to the Nazis that by the end of 1940, the Gestapo had created a dedicated unit, known as the SS-Sonderkommando ZJ ("Special Unit ZJ") to stop its sabotage and intelligence activities. In December 1941 the first wave of arrests of agents NSZ/ZJ began. At the end of 1943 alone, 80 individuals were arrested. The Military Tribunal of Nazi Germany more rigorously expanded German military laws, which dealt with those arrested mercilessly. From among dozens of arrested, only 3 individuals (among them one German national) were found not guilty. The others were sentenced to lengthy imprisonment, and half of them were sentenced to death. The names of the ZJ agents of the Intelligence Unit "West" sentenced to death and executed by the Nazis by beheading at the Moabit prison in Berlin, are immortalised on a commemorative plaque at the St. Brigida's Basilica in Gdańsk, Poland.

In September 1942, OW ZJ merged with part of National Military Organization (Narodowa Organizacja Wojskowa, the rest of which merged with ZWZ-AK) and formed the National Armed Forces (Narodowe Siły Zbrojne). The OW ZJ faction opposed to the NSZ deciding to co-operate with AK in 1944, and the so-called NZS-ZJ faction would break off the main NSZ and refuse most co-operation with AK. Members of the OW ZJ, and later, NSZ, were strongly opposed to the Soviet Union throughout the war as an enemy of the Polish people just like Nazi Germany, and thus were militantly opposed to the Soviet-installed regime, which became established in Poland after World War II. The communist regime branded them enemies of the state, and the communist propaganda apparatus consistently referred to them as fascists and Nazis (see cursed soldiers).

== Contributions to Allied victory ==
OW ZJ did not carry out many combat operations (in any case, they were uncommon until 1942–1944) but instead had a well-developed intelligence network. It also engaged in psychological warfare and carried out various propaganda operations.

Among many accomplishments of the ZJ Intelligence Unit "West", which played a significant role in the outcome of the war were obtaining information about Nazi aggression on Greece, obtaining a date of an attack by the Afrika Korps directed towards Alexandria, establishing the location of the Nazi battleship Tirpitz, establishing the locations of the ultrasecret Nazi V-2 rocket manufacturing facility in Peenemünde and establishing the location of the test site of German V rockets and their precise drawings and dimensions.

The ZJ also managed to infiltrate its agent, Edmund Konieczny, into the Deutsche Werke Kiel repair shipyard in Gdynia to ascertain the number and types of vessels being repaired there and the extent of their battle damage, which allowed it in turn to locate the German battleship Gneisenau. It had escaped the British Navy, which sought to destroy it in the Norwegian fjords .

ZJ is credited with the destruction of a German experimental submarine in Gdańsk.

== Structure and membership ==
The OW ZJ commander for most of its existence was Władysław Marcinkowski "Jaxa".

In 1942 OW ZJ had most likely about 10,000 members, but some Polish historians give a higher estimates, even up to 70,000.

OW ZJ had most influence in Warsaw, Kielce, Radom and Łódź.

== See also ==
- Lizard Union (medieval) for origins of the name
