= National Radical Camp =

Series of far-right Polish ultranationalist organisations

National Radical Camp Obóz Narodowo-Radykalny
- Abbreviation: ONR
- Leader: Jan Mosdorf (Note: (National Radical Camp)); Bolesław Piasecki (Note: (National Radical Movement Falanga)); Henryk Rossman (Note: (National Radical Camp ABC))
- Governing body: Polish Organization
- Founder: Jan Mosdorf; Tadeusz Gluziński; Henryk Rossman; Bolesław Piasecki
- Founded: 14 April 1934; 92 years ago
- Banned: 10 July 1934; 92 years ago
- Split from: National Party
- Preceded by: Sekcja Młodych Stronnictwa Narodowego
- Membership: 5,000 (1937 est.)
- Ideology: National radicalism
- Political position: Far-right
- Religion: Roman Catholicism
- Colours: Green White
- Slogan: Czołem Wielkiej Polsce ("Hail Great Poland")
- Anthem: "Hymn Młodych" (transl. 'Youth Anthem')

The National Radical Camp (Polish: Obóz Narodowo-Radykalny, ONR) was an ultranationalist and antisemitic political movement which existed in the pre-World War II Second Polish Republic, and an illegal Polish anti-communist, and nationalist political party formed on 14 April 1934 mostly by the youth radicals who left the National Party of the National Democracy movement.

Shortly after its creation ONR split into two branches: the National Radical Movement "Falanga" (Polish: Ruch Narodowo Radykalny-Falanga; RNR "Falanga" or ONR "Falanga"), and National Radical Camp "ABC" (Polish: Obóz Narodowo-Radykalny ABC; ONR "ABC"). "Falanga" is Polish for "phalanx", a reference to Falangism, and "ABC" refers to a newspaper printed by the organisation at the time.

Since 1993, an organization has existed in Poland, which has adopted the name ONR, following its ideology and traditions.

== History ==
=== Origins of ONR ===
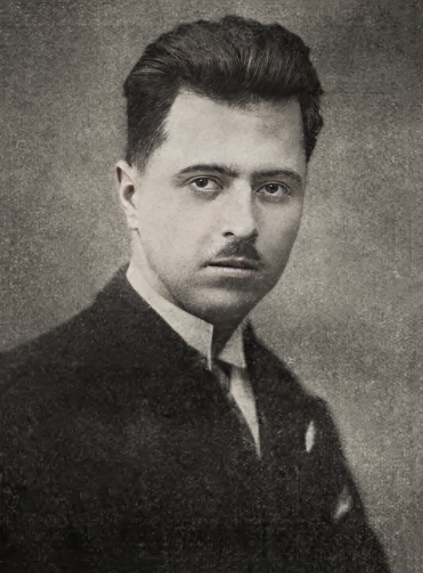
Jan Mosdorf, main ideologue and the official ONR leader

Dominated by youth, National Radical Camp was an outgrowth of the Endecja movement, an ultra-nationalist movement that had arisen in the 1920s. The emergence of the National Radical Camp was part of broader movement of the Polish right toward radicalization in the 1930s. Its basis was the generational difference of the "young" within the nationalist camp. The writings of the national-radicalism cultivated the cult of youth, writing for example: "In the fight against the young, the old cannot keep up." As Włodzimierz Sznarbachowski recalled:

The National Radical Camp was founded as a rebellion against the "fools". Young people [...] yearned for a strong, charismatic leader [...]. Dmowski certainly did not have such charisma." This was confirmed by Wojciech Wasiutyński: "It was not Dmowski who pushed the youth towards fascism, he rather resisted their fascist tendencies. The split in the nationalist movement in 1934 occurred precisely because Dmowski did not agree to the fascist program of the young."

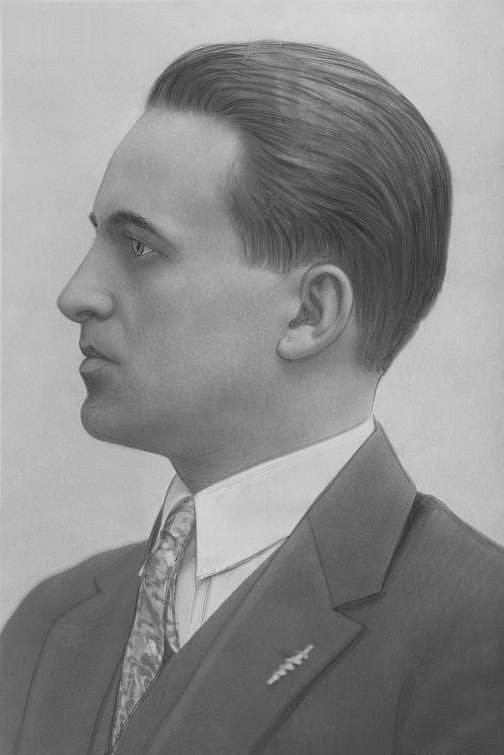
Henryk Rossman, leader of the Polish Organization, a secret body that headed the ONR

The criticism coming from the "young" initially concerned tactical and psychological issues – the "old" were accused of "complete indolence, inability to act". The mechanism of secession was set in motion only by the frustration caused by the lack of reaction of the movement's leadership to the dissolution of the Camp of Great Poland (OWP). The "young" tried to maintain organizational independence, avoiding subordination to the National Party, dominated by the "old". Their stronghold was the "Eight" - the secret leadership of the National Democrat youth structures. Initially, the "Eight" proposed to Roman Dmowski that "while maintaining a common confidential organization, we should establish a second party with a radical program". In July 1933 during the training camp of the "young" in Błota Karwieńskie, a split occurred: while Tadeusz Bielecki was in favor of moving to the SN Youth Section (Sekcja Młodych SN), Jan Mosdorf wanted to maintain independence and conduct underground activities. Mosdorf did not manage to push through his project. However, the National Radical Publishing Committee of the Young was established (Witold Staniszkis, Jan Rembieliński, Jan Mosdorf). The Committee published brochures popularizing the program of the "young". Its propaganda platform was also "Sztafeta" - published since October 1933. In the autumn of 1933, representatives of the "young" from Warsaw and Lwów met at Henryk Rossman's to work out a common position - mainly making personal accusations (incompetence, passivity), they decided to demand that Dmowski remove Tadeusz Bielecki and Aleksander Dębski. Only when their conversation with Dmowski ended in failure was the decision to secede made. According to Jerzy Drobnik, who emphasised the personal ambitions of the secessionists, "the tool got tired of being a tool". The conflict intensified in the winter of 1933/1934. In the first quarter of 1934, police sources had already noted the existence of a "national-radical movement of the "Young" within the Party". In March, the SN authorities deprived Mosdorf of the leadership of the Youth Section and banned the publication of "Sztafeta". The "young" responded by establishing the ONR on 14 April 1934.

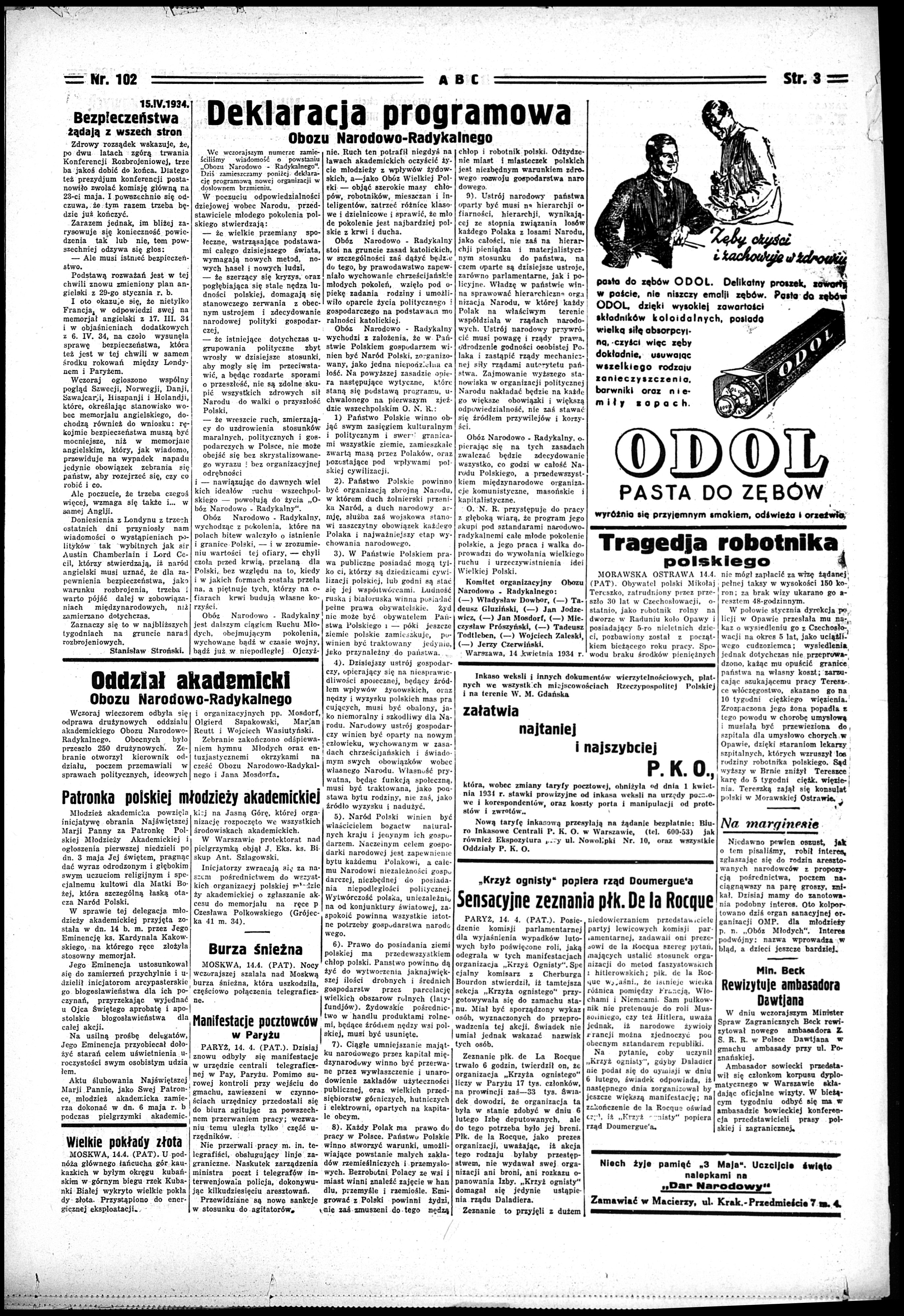
Program declaration of the National-Radical Camp (ONR) published on April 15, 1934, in the magazine "ABC"

=== Creation and legal activity ===
The National-Radical Camp was formed by a group of Warsaw academic youth led by Tadeusz Gluziński, Jan Jodzewicz, Jan Korlec, Jan Mosdorf, Henryk Rossman, Tadeusz Todtleben, Wojciech Zaleski and others in the canteen of the Warsaw University of Technology. Its ideological declaration, drafted mainly by Mosdorf, was published the next day in the weekly "Sztafeta". The ONR was to be a social movement, led by a multi-stage conspiratorial Polish Organization, interacting through loyal and proven activists with various associations and organizations, and there were plenty of them at the time, as almost everyone was involved in something - from student corporations, Brotherly Aid to scouting. After the establishment of the ONR, a period of intensive organizational development followed. Within two months, several thousand members were recruited. In Warsaw alone, the ONR had 2,200 members and 3,000 supporters in 17 sections. National radicals operated almost exclusively in the capital city of Warsaw. Attempts were made to remedy this by expanding local structures. In May 1934, 33 new sections were created (18 in the Warsaw voivodeship, 13 in the Łódź voivodeship, one each in the Lublin and Nowogródek voivodeships), and the activity of national radicals was also noted in the Poznań voivodeship (the absorption of the Great Poland Party) and Wilno voivodeships. During the month of its existence, the ONR held over 20 public meetings and also achieved success in the local elections in Żychlin.

=== Repression and delegalization ===
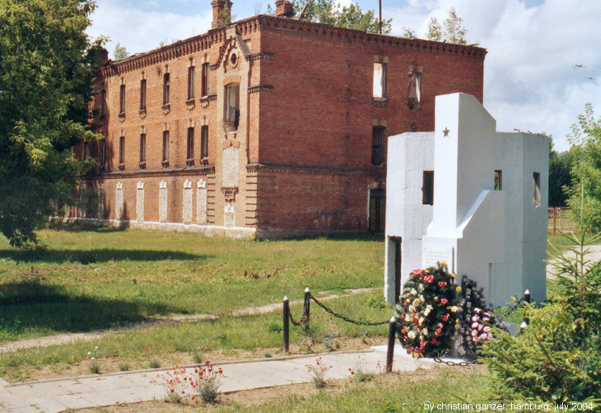
Place of Isolation at Bereza Kartuska

The collapse of the organization came suddenly: the assassination of Bronisław Pieracki by Ukrainian nationalists on June 15, 1934, gave the Sanation authorities a pretext to deal with national radicals – after a wave of arrests, the camp was officially banned on July 10, 1934. Repressions led to a crisis of the organization. The previous leader Jan Mosdorf was discredited by his passive attitude (hiding during arrests). Isolated in the national-radical movement, he became closer to Catholic-social groups. Some of the ONR-ists began to conspire as the Camp of National Revolution, but many joined the Union of Young Nationalists (ZMN) or the Youth Section of the SN (SM SN). The secret leadership of the movement was not to be established until early 1935.

=== Split of the ONR ===
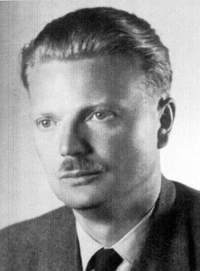
Bolesław Piasecki, leader of the ONR splinter group known as the Falanga

The Falanga. Bolesław Piasecki's split group of the ONR symbol

The delegalization revealed a conflict between two generations of “youngs”. Włodzimierz Sznarbachowski explained: “the years of age difference also meant a different social status. […] We, often twenty years younger, did not want compromises. We wanted […] to move forward unfettered by anything”. Wilhelm Szewczyk expressed this difference even more emphatically: “The ABC was more stable in its beliefs and methods, small and quiet. More mature people united here […]. The “Falanga” had a younger, explosive, often anarchist element. […] each of its members was armed with brass knuckles and two […] revolvers”. The difference in temperament gave rise to tactical differences – while the elders, led by Rossman, wanted the movement to be led by a secret hierarchical organization of the lodge type, Piasecki’s supporters believed in the principle of leadership. Already in 1933, at the "Akademik Polski" (Polish Academic) an Ideological Committee was established - on the initiative of B. Piasecki - which developed the ideas of the Political Organization of the Nation and a national planned economy. Ideological differences were already evident before the establishment of the ONR, at the beginning of 1934, then they intensified (extremists wanted armed struggle and radicalization of the social program), to explode with full force after B. Piasecki was released from the camp in Bereza Kartuska. The split finally took place at the beginning of 1935, it was revealed on 25 April, and on 29 June of that year in Kąty the founding congress of the faction, called Falanga or - from the initials of the leader - Bepists took place. From then on, Rossman’s group continued to operate as the ONR “ABC” (after the title of their newspaper) while Piasecki took the lead of the National-Radical Movement, commonly referred to as the ONR “Falanga".

=== During World War II ===
During World War II, both organizations created underground resistance organizations: ONR "ABC" was transformed into Grupa Szańca (Rampart Group), whose military arm became the Związek Jaszczurczy (Lizard Union), while the RNR "Falanga" created the Confederation of the Nation. They were not supportive of the mainstream Polish Underground State related to the Polish government in exile. During the German occupation of Poland, many of the former ONR activists belonged to National Armed Forces resistance groups. After World War II, the forced exile of many ONR members was made permanent by the newly created Polish People's Republic, which branded them enemies of the state.

== Ideology ==
=== National radicalism – origins ===
The secessionists developed their own, clearly distinct ideology called "national radicalism". "National radicalism" is not the same as radical nationalism. This term was constructed on the model of "national socialism" and "national syndicalism", because it should be remembered that in the 1920s the term "radicalism" was used to describe the non-Marxist left. Jan Jodzewicz said at the All-Polish Youth congress in 1929 that the enemy were "radicals of all shades and camps". Five years later, "Szczerbiec" publicists fully annexed this concept, writing that "radicalism without anti-Semitism is no radicalism". National radicalism was therefore supposed to be a response to the enemy's challenge by partially adopting its slogans and methods - a kind of national equivalent of the left.

The ONR did not, however, seek models in the socialist movement, or even less so in the communist movement – on the contrary, it was characterised by uncompromising hostility towards Marxists. The point of reference, however, was Piłsudski's legacy. National radicals were fascinated by the legend of the Legions’ deeds, which they camouflaged under the slogans of cooperation with the army. This was clearly done in the RNR. Włodzimierz Sznarbachowski recalled that Bolesław Piasecki was greatly influenced by his acquaintance with Piłsudski's political thought during his stay in Bereza. Evidence of this can already be found in the brochure "The Spirit of New Times and the Young Movement" – Piasecki noticed nationalist elements in the writings of Adam Skwarczyński at that time. Over time, the positive opinion of the Legions began to transform into a postulate of a synthesis of “Polish political thought” (national-democratic) and “soldierly” (Piłsudski's). In 1939, a journalist from "Przełom" wrote that RNR "Enriched and deepened the content of Polish nationalism, associating the political thought of the author of "Polish Policy" with the values of the soldier's psyche, developed on the battlefields of Józef Piłsudski's Legions". Jan Mosdorf also expressed a positive opinion about Piłsudski and the independence movement. Even the most reserved ONR "ABC" in this respect emphasized that "crossed [...] the barriers between Poles-soldiers and Poles-civilians" ("soldiers" is a euphemism for the Sanation).

The need to revise the approach to their own tradition was pointed out. The national radicals stressed that they were the rightful successors of the national camp, because "Roman Dmowski is not 'property' of the National Party". Even the Falangists admitted to this heritage: "The National Radical Movement departed from the Party, which was led by Roman Dmowski. [...] But the National Radical Movement based its ideology on the foundations of thought that Roman Dmowski gave to the new generation". At the same time, however, they drew attention to the outdatedness of the old divisions. "All the old divisions [...] are irrelevant and harmful" - proclaimed the Falangists, and "Sztafeta" echoed them: "It is time [...] to end the old [...] party disputes and outdated scores". The national radicals wrote with distaste about the lack of a program of both camps: "The strongest memory for the National Democrats is the fight against the Sanation, for the Sanation - the fight against the Endecja. In this fight, both of these groups find the meaning of their existence". Meanwhile, "the concept of the right and the left is outdated, not corresponding to the actual forces that are fighting for the face of Poland: nationalism and the folk front". This sometimes led activists to conclusions that were downright shocking - Wojciech Zaleski is supposed to have said privately about Dmowski and Piłsudski: "it would be better for Poland if both old gentlemen died".

=== National radicalism and fascism ===
When looking for sources of inspiration for national radicalism, foreign fascist movements cannot be ignored. At that time, national radicals were generally perceived as the Polish version of fascism. This was not only the opinion of their left-wing opponents. Jan Rembieliński wrote that “the ONR began in a completely fascist manner: young people in light shirts, raising hands in greeting.” According to Zygmunt Wojciechowski, the ONR program was “formulated […] with the undoubted influence of Hitlerist economic doctrines.” Jerzy Drobnik recalled that in May 1934 Mosdorf and Rossmann asked him to provide Nazi political literature.

While Krystyna Rogaczewska sees in national radicalism "obvious connections with national socialism", Jan Józef Lipski had to admit that "Unconditional apology for Hitlerism is almost non-existent". It is easy to find examples of both criticism and enthusiasm for fascism in national-radical journalism. National radicals were clearly fascinated by Italian fascism and German Nazism and other related movements, looking at them with jealous admiration. The fascination was visible in adopting external forms: uniforms, greetings, stylized symbolism. Kajetan H. Stolarski wrote in the poem March of the Young: "we will raise our right hand, saluting the Sword of the Chrobry– our victorious sign!". Positive opinions about fascism and Nazism were formulated in both branches of the national radical movement. In the pages of "Jutro" it was written: "Hitler with his bold and consistent work tore them [Germany] out of chaos [...] and pushed them towards a better future. No other [...] person of the present era has aroused so much faith, devotion and enthusiasm in his nation". The journalists from "Jutro" were echoed by the journalists from "Falanga": "It is beyond doubt that National Socialism reborn Germany, that it healed its social, economic and political life."

The party was influenced by the ideas of Italian Fascism. It rejected parliamentary democracy and called for the construction of a "national state," based on the principles of hierarchy, one-person leadership, and elimination of national minorities from public life.

== See also ==
- Camp of Great Poland
- Confederation of the Nation
- Nara (disambiguation)
- National Movement (Poland)
- ONR (disambiguation)
- Camp of National Unity (Obóz Zjednoczenia Narodowego)
- Tomasz Greniuch
