= National Military Organization =

- Narodowa Organizacja Wojskowa (NOW)
- Emblem of National Military Organization
- Active: 13 October 1939 - November 1942, November 1942
- Country: German-occupied Poland
- Allegiance: Polish Underground State
- Type: Paramilitary
- Role: Armed forces of the National Party
- Size: c. 80,000 (1942)

Commanders
- Notable commanders: Bolesław Kozubowski; Ignacy Oziewicz

Narodowa Organizacja Wojskowa (National Military Organization, NOW) was one of the Polish resistance movements in World War II. Created in October 1939, it did not merge with the Service for Poland's Victory (SZP)/Union of Armed Struggle (ZWZ); later Home Army (AK). Nevertheless, it recognized the Polish government in exile, which was located in London. The National Military Organization was politically related to the National Party (SN). In 1942/1943 it split into two parts; one merged with the Home Army, while another formed the National Armed Forces (NSZ). After the Warsaw Uprising, most of NOW members formed the National Military Union (NZW).

== History ==
On October 13, 1939, a few days after the end of the joint German and Soviet Invasion of Poland, a conspirational meeting of leaders of the National Party took place in Warsaw. During the meeting, a military organization called the National Army was created. Later on, it changed the name into Military Organization of the National Party (Organizacja Wojskowa Stronnictwa Narodowego), then it was called National Armed Units (Narodowe Oddzially Wojskowe), to finally be named Narodowa Organizacja Wojskowa (since July 1, 1941).

The NOW was politically, financially and personally overseen by Military Department of the National Party. At the same time, it had a widespread autonomy concerning its structure, intelligence, and training. Its first planned commandant was General Marian Januszajtis-Zegota, but he was arrested by the NKVD in Lwów, on October 27, 1939. Under the circumstances, the NOW was commanded by Colonel Aleksander Demidowicz-Demidecki. In December 1939, Demidecki left occupied Poland, and was replaced by Colonel Boleslaw Kozubowski.

In the late 1940 and 1941, the Gestapo carried out mass arrests of members of the National Party in Lesser Poland, Pomerelia and Warsaw. After this, the party had to re-create its depleted structures, and in September 1941, new leader of the SN, Stefan Sacha, named Colonel Jozef Rokicki new commandant of the NOW. In the spring 1942, several units of the NOW, mainly from Warsaw and Radom, decided to become part of the Home Army, and in May 1942, Stefan Sacha contacted General Stefan Rowecki, discussing with him merger of the two organizations. As a result, on August 23, 1942, an agreement was signed in which the National Military Organization was merged with the Home Army. This fact caused dissatisfaction among some of the organization's staff. On September 20, 1942, a new organization was established, the National Armed Forces, which included the former members of the National Military Organization and the Military Organization Lizard Union and several other organizations, and in November 1942, the merger was completed. Several NOW members, headed by August Michalowski, disagreed with it. The organization split into two parts - one was united with the Home Army, while another continued independent activities. The new NOW was headed by Colonel Ignacy Oziewicz, and was divided into five districts: Radom, Kielce, Częstochowa, Podlasie, Lublin and Łódź. In 1942, the new NOW merged with Military Organization Lizard Union, creating the National Armed Forces (Narodowe Sily Zbrojne, NSZ).

In 1942, before the split, the NOW had some 80,000 members, mostly in Greater Poland, Lesser Poland and Mazovia. It had its own guerilla units, under such leaders, as Franciszek Przysiezniak, Jozef Czuchra, Leon Janio and Jozef Zadzierski. The organization, however, concentrated its efforts on intelligence, and capturing German agents and collaborators. Weapons and ammunition were collected for the future uprising, a system of communication was created, underground press was distributed. There were several sabotage actions, and in order to rescue Jews, the NOW cooperated with other organizations. Some 1500 NOW soldiers fought in the Warsaw Uprising.

== Structure ==
- Commandant in Chief of the NOW
- Headquarters of the NOW
- First Department (Organizational),
- Second Department (Intelligence),
- Third Department (Training and Operations),
- Fourth Department (Supply),
- Fifth Department (Communications),
- Central Propaganda Office,
- Sanitary Services,
- Women's National Military Organization (since 1942).

== Districts ==
Until mid-1941, the NOW was divided into 14 districts:

- Warsaw - City,
- Warsaw - Land,
- Radom,
- Kielce,
- Lublin,
- Rzeszow (also called Central Industrial Area),
- Białystok,
- Kraków,
- Częstochowa,
- Lwów (since June 1943),
- Podlasie,
- Łódź,
- Poznań
- Pomorze and Kujawy.

=== Białystok district ===
In the autumn of 1939, an envoy from the commander of the National People's Military Organisation reached Białystok. The first national organisation was established in Białystok based on the staff of the National Gymnasium Organisation. Its organisers were Zygmunt Hykiel and Tadeusz Mieczysław Czerkawski. On 31 October 1939, Zygmunt Hykiel set off as a representative of Białystok to Warsaw in order to establish contact with Szymon Poradowski. Hykiel returned to Białystok in the last ten days of November as a courier of the National Party to Vilnius. The task of organizing the National Military Organization in the Białystok Voivodeship was given to a group of officers sent to this area by the Main Command in the summer of 1941. The group of officers was led by Maj. Reserve Jan Kąkolewski, pseudonym "Gracjan". The function of the District Commander was performed by Edward Szczepanski, pseudonym "Świt". The district included the area of the city and district of Białystok, and before joining the NSZ numbered about 1,000 soldiers.

On August 23, 1942, the National Military Organization was merged with the Home Army. This fact caused dissatisfaction in the ranks of NOW among some of the organization's staff. On September 20, 1942, a new organization was established, the National Armed Forces, which included the NOW Fronde and the Lizard Union and several other organizations. In the Białystok district, the initiative to establish the NSZ came from the Lizard Union. The ZJ envoy, 2nd Lt. Feliks Mazurek, pseudonym "Zych", began talks with representatives of the Armed Confederation. As a result of the talks, the NSZ was established. Initially, the ranks of this organization included the Białystok ZJ and KZ Districts, as well as small groups from the Eastern Combat Organization, the Defenders of Poland Command, the Union for the Reconstruction of the Republic, and the Home Army. At the end of 1942, "Zych" began talks with representatives of the NOW from the "Bialek" District Command. In May 1943, the commander of the "Bialek" district, along with the entire district, moved to the NSZ. Only a small group in the city of Białystok remained in NOW. The "Bialek" district practically ceased to exist in the structure of NOW.

In 1943 while lack of stability prevailed, schisms, attempts to rebuild the Białystok District structure continued. The situation was also worsened by the frequent change of the District Commander. In April 1943, a representative of the Main Command, Major "Stefan", arrived from Warsaw and reorganized the district. Major Jan Kąkolewski ("Gracjan") was dismissed from the function of the District Commander and left for Warsaw in May. Before the Main Command appointed a new acting commander, Eugeniusz Trzeciak, pseudonym "Bronislaw", became the district commander. In May, a new commander, Major Marcin Wawrzyniak, pseudonym "Los", arrived in the Białystok area. This nomination was poorly received by "Bronislaw" and the District staff, who blocked organizational contacts. When in August 1943 he was given false information that the Gestapo had exposed him, Major "Los" left the district and went to Warsaw. Leaving the area, he handed over his duties to Antoni Kozłowski "Bialy", but he soon moved to NOW "Roman" - August Michalowski. In this situation, "Bronislaw" once again took over the duties of the commandant. Until he moved to NSZ, which happened only a year later, Bialy considered himself the commander of the NOW District. The next district commander was appointed on October 25, 1943, Mieczysław Grygorcewicz, pseudonym "Bohdan". He arrived in the Białystok region on November 10, 1943, but was arrested during a raid by the gendarmerie on December 5. On December 1, 1943, "Bohdan" appointed 2nd Lt. Marian Kaminski, pseudonym "Marianski", as the district commander.

== Publications ==
- Walka (Struggle). Main publication of the National Party, with circulation of 20,000.
- Wielka Polska
- Rzeczpospolita Polska
- Mloda Polska
- Polak
- Zolnierz Wielkiej Polski
- Sprawa Narodu
- Mysl Narodowa
