= Independence March (Poland) =

Annual patriotic demonstration

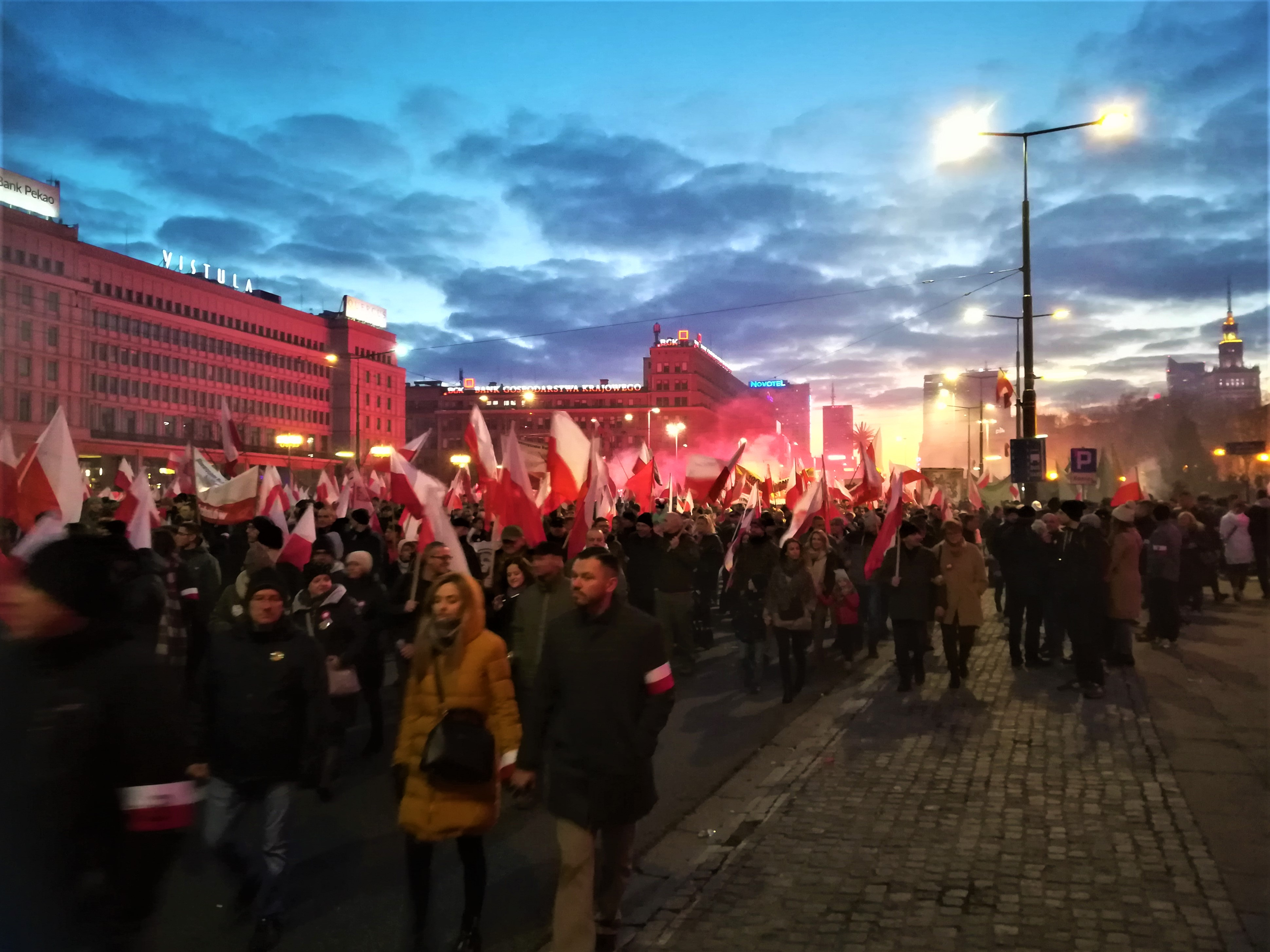
Independence March in 2019

The Independence March (Polish: Marsz Niepodległości) is an annual patriotic and nationalist demonstration in Warsaw held on Poland's Independence Day, 11 November. Since 2011, the March has attracted annually up to 100 thousand participants. In 2020, the March was organized similar to one of a car procession. Major participating organizations have included the Confederation, the National Radical Camp, the All-Polish Youth and Law and Justice.

About 60,000 were in the 2017 march marking the 99th anniversary of independence, with placards such as "Clean Blood" seen on the march. Over the years other placards or slogans have included "Pure Poland, white Poland" and "white Europe of brotherly nations".

Many nationalists from around Europe usually join the March.

== Theme ==
(Source: Association of Independence March)

- 2012 – Let's get Poland back (Polish: Odzyskajmy Polskę),
- 2013 – New generation is coming (Polish: Idzie nowe pokolenie!),
- 2014 – Patriot Army (Polish: Armia Patriotów),
- 2015 – Poland for Poles, Poles for Poland (Polish: Polska dla Polaków, Polacy dla Polski),
- 2016 – Poland as a stronghold of Europe (Polish: Polska bastionem Europy),
- 2017 – We want God! (Polish: My chcemy Boga!),
- 2018 – God, Honor, Fatherland (Polish: Bóg, Honor, Ojczyzna),
- 2019 – Have in Your care the whole nation (Polish: Miej w opiece naród cały),
- 2020 – Our civilization, our rules (Polish: Nasza cywilizacja, nasze zasady),
- 2021 – Independence – not for sale (Polish: Niepodległość nie na sprzedaż),
- 2022 – Strong Nation Great Poland (Polish: Silny Naród Wielka Polska).
- 2023 – Poland Is Not Yet Lost (Polish: Jeszcze Polska nie zginęła)
- 2024 – We are the power of Great Poland (Polish: Wielkiej Polski moc to My)
- 2025 – One Nation – Strong Poland (Polish: Jeden Naród – silna Polska)
- 2026 – The Pole is the host of his own land! (Polish: "Polak w Polsce gospodarzem!")

== Gallery ==
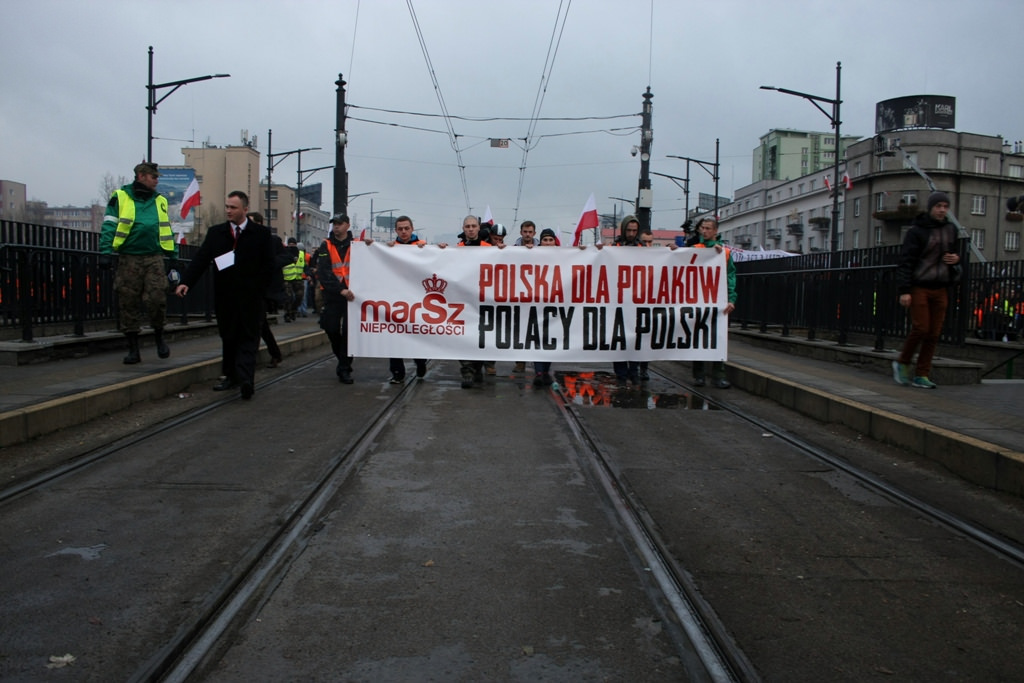
Demonstrators with the slogan of the Independence March: Poland for Poles, Poles for Poland (2015)

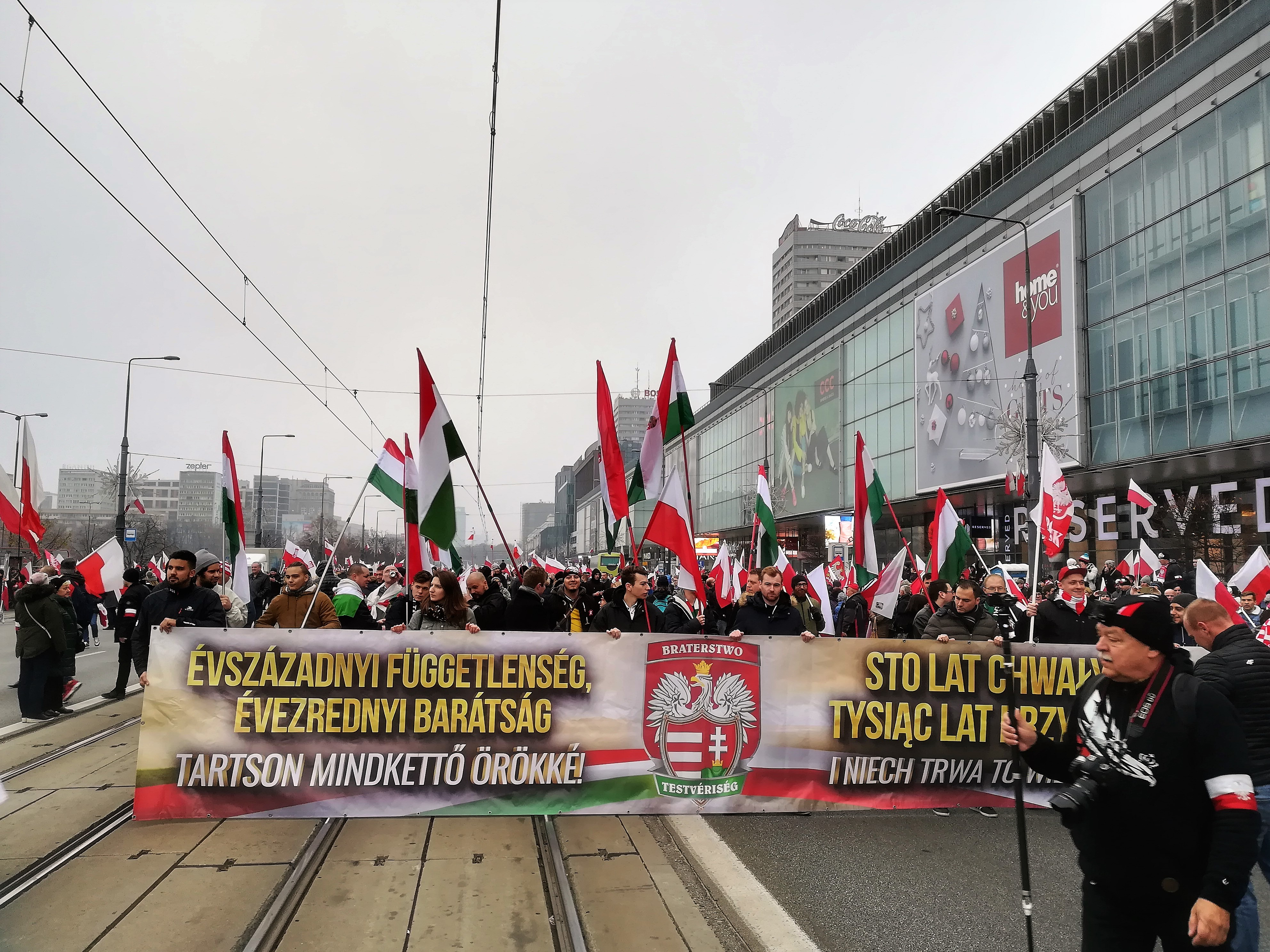
Marchers from Hungary (2018)

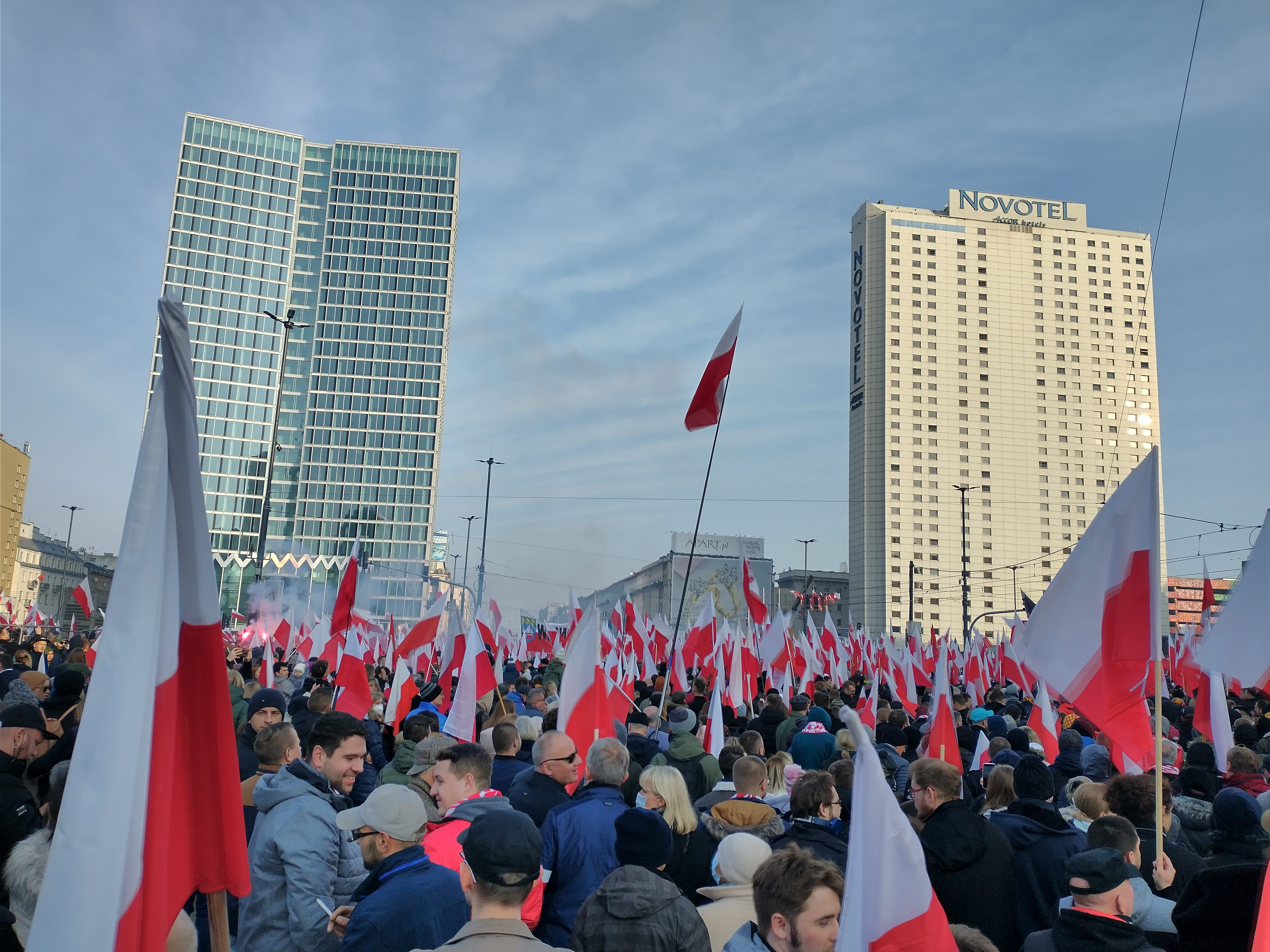
Independence March 2021

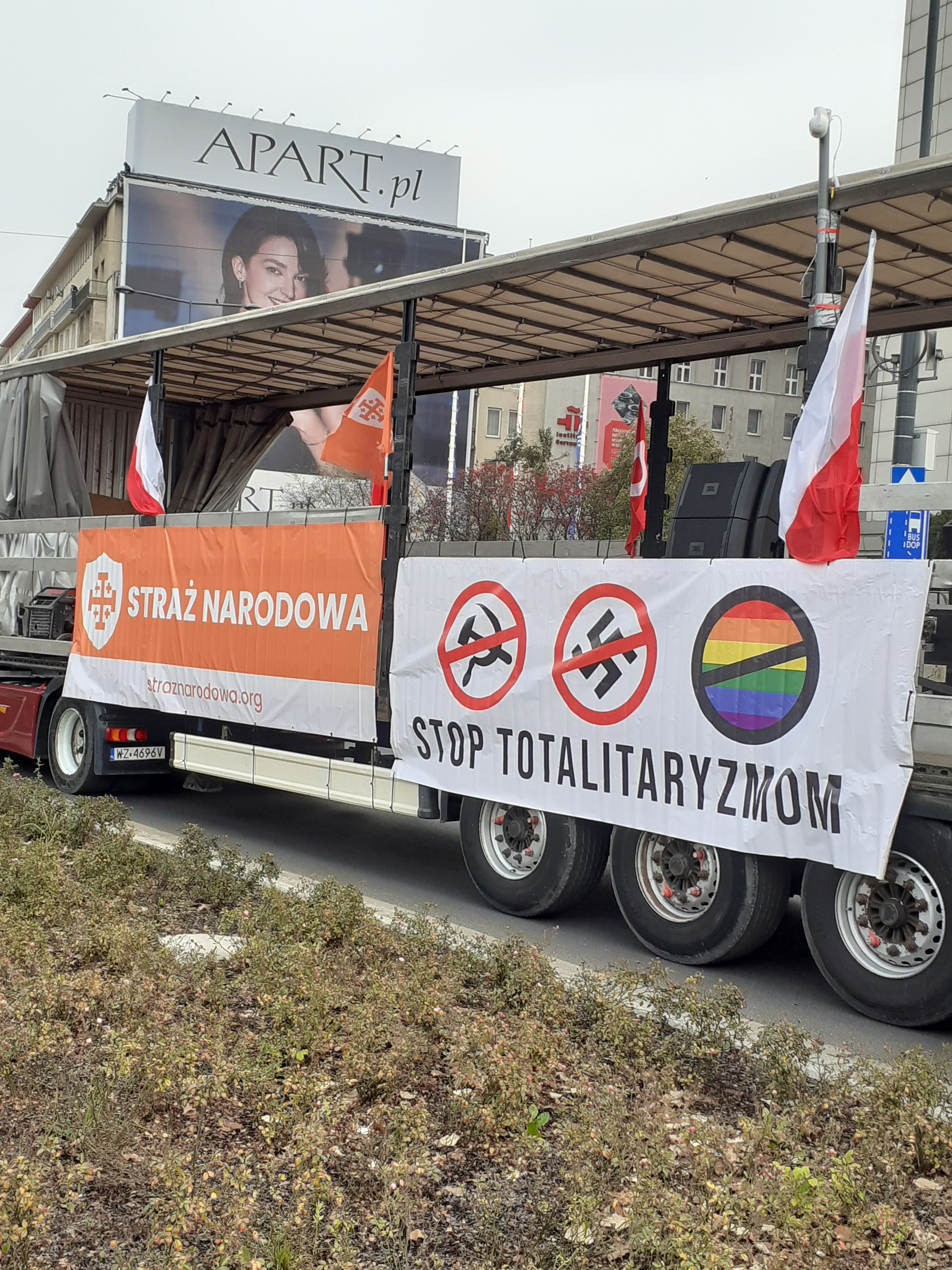
Banners at the Independence March in 2022

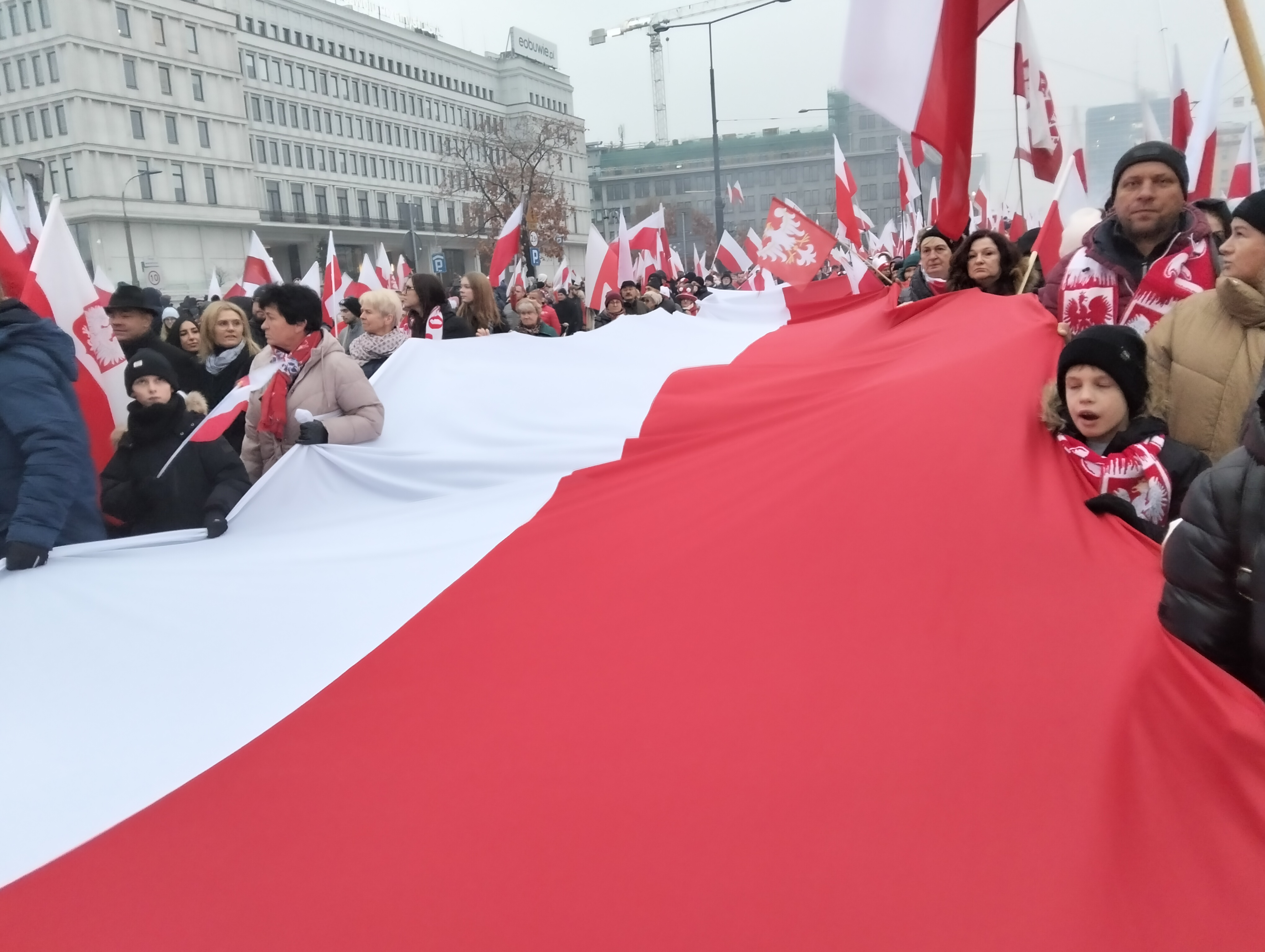
Independence March in 2024

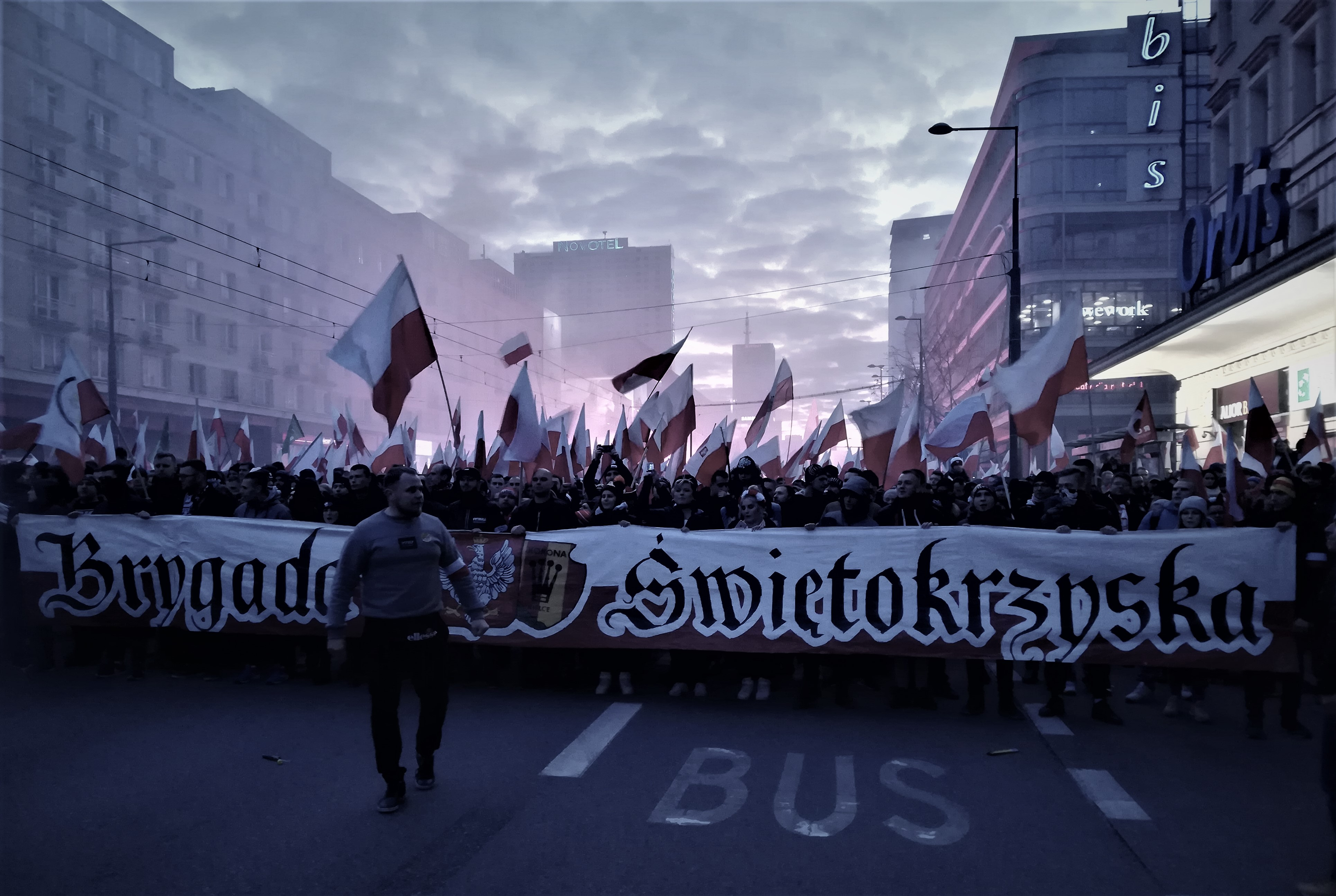
Banner paying tribute to the Holy Cross Mountains Brigade, 2019

== International participation ==
In 2017, American white supremacist Richard Spencer planned to speak at the march, but was banned from doing so.

For the march in 2018, the Italian neo-fascist party Forza Nuova was invited. Far-right activists and groups from Hungary, Estonia, Belarus, Spain, Italy, the Netherlands, the US, and Portugal joined the event in 2021 and formed the "Nationalistic Column" with Polish far-right organizations and movements, including but not limited to: Stowarzyszenie Trzecia Droga, Szturmowcy, Autonomiczni Nacjonaliści, All-Polish Youth, National Rebirth of Poland, and the National Radical Camp.

== See also ==
- Day of Honor (Hungary)
- 612 march (Finland)
- Far-right politics in Poland
- Polish nationalism
