= Stowarzyszenie Trzecia Droga =

Association Third Way Stowarzyszenie "Trzecia Droga"
- Leader: Filip Marcin Paluch
- Founded: 2015
- Registered: 20 January 2016
- Headquarters: Rysi Stok 4, 30-237 Kraków, Polska
- Ideology: Third Position; Polish nationalism
- Political position: Far-right

Party flag

Website
- https://3droga.pl

Stowarzyszenie Trzecia Droga (Polish: Association Third Way) is a Polish Third-Positionist organization formed in 2015. Trzecia Droga actively participates in The Independence March as part of the Black Bloc, which the organization helped create, along with organizations such as Szturmowcy, Niklot and the National Radical Camp.

== History ==
Trzecia Droga was formed in 2015. On the 28th of February 2015 Trzecia Droga participated in a nationalist march in memory of the Cursed soldiers.

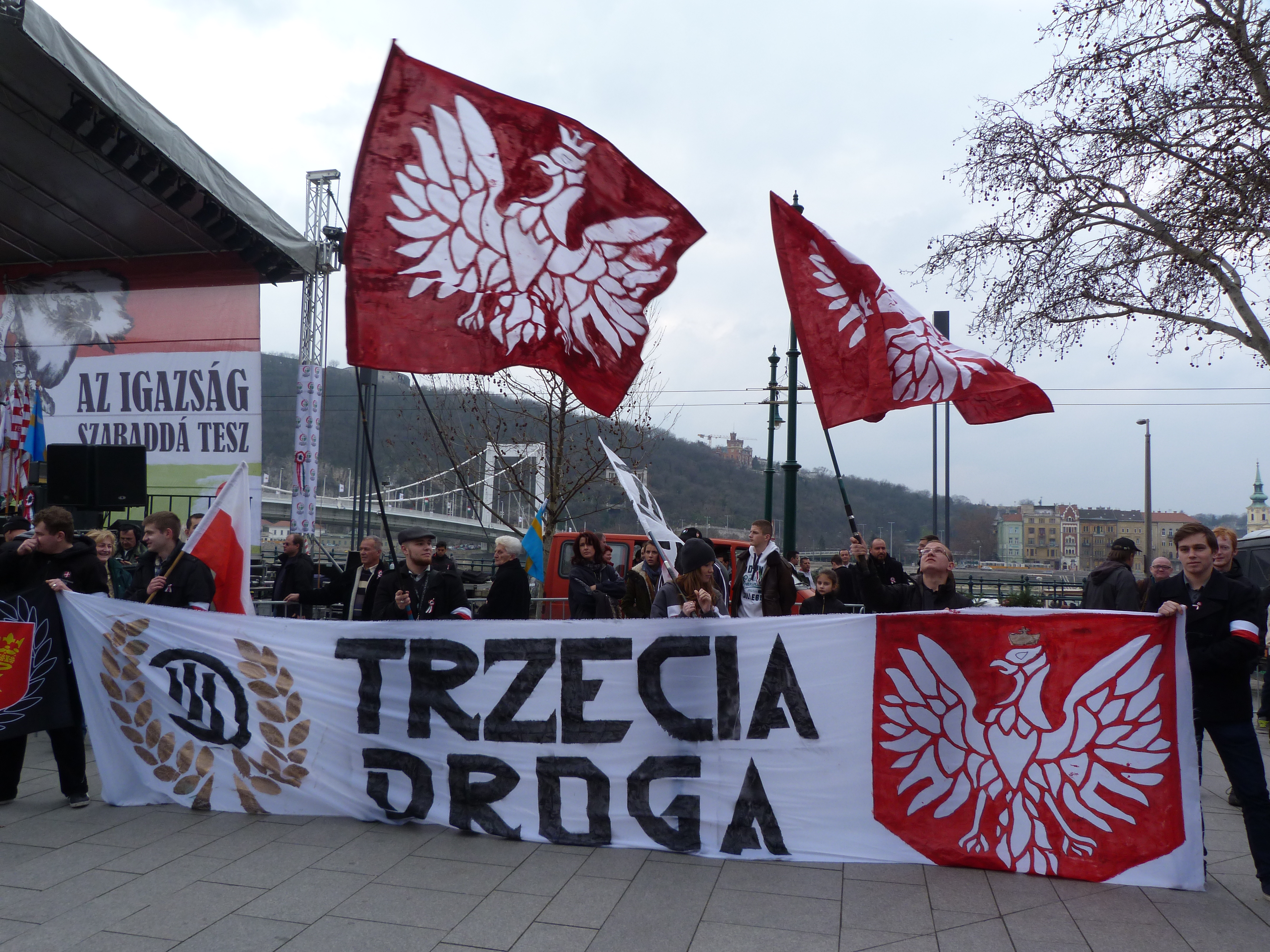
Trzecia Droga in Budapest, March 2015

In March 2015 it participated in a nationalist event in Budapest, along with several other Polish organisations. Trzecia Droga organised a nationalist event on 21 October 2015 in celebration of the Independence Day. The organisation was registered as an association on the 20th of January 2016. Trzecia Droga participated in a nationalist march on the 1st of May 2016 in celebration of the International Workers' Day, along with organizations such as the National Rebirth of Poland, All-Polish Youth etc. On the 17th of February 2017, Trzecia Droga participated in a nationalist event in support of Serbia.

Logo of Barykada

Throughout 2018 Trzecia Droga organised small events and marches to celebrate national heroes of Poland, and participated in the 2018 Independence March. It also participated in the 2019 Independence March. Trzecia Droga organized a march in memory of the Cursed soldiers in 2020.

In July 2020, Trzecia Droga formed Barykada, an organization of Polish nationalists forced to emigrate to other countries. Barykada seeks to spread the ideology of Trzecia Droga internationally and establish contact with foreign nationalist organisations. During the 2022 Independence March, members of Trzecia Droga carried a banner that read "KIJÓW-WARSZAWA – WSPÓLNA SPRAWA" while marching as part of the «Nationalist Column. In the same column were spotted flags of the Revanche Tactical Group — a Ukrainian combat unit operated by the Ukrainian Conservative Party.

Trzecia Droga participated in the 2024 Nation Europa conference.

Trzecia Droga continued participating in Independence Marches as part of both the Black Bloc and the Nationalist Column.

The organization continues to participate in events and marches along with groups such as the National-Radical Camp and Socjalna Alternatywa
