= Far-right politics in Poland =

Like in other nations across the world, there are several far-right (Polish: skrajna prawica) organizations and parties operating in Poland.

== History and ideology ==
=== Past ===
An important element of Polish nationalism has been its identification with the Roman Catholic religion with its roots in the Counter-Reformation of the 17th century, and one that became established clearly in the interwar period. Although the old Commonwealth was religiously diverse and highly tolerant, the Roman Catholic religious element with messianic undertones (the Christ of Nations) became one of the defining characteristics of the modern Polish identity. Roman Dmowski, a Polish politician of that era, was vital in defining that concept, and has been called the "father of Polish nationalism." Dmowski was the leader of National Democracy. After his death, more radically inclined youth broke off and created the National Radical Camp.

=== Modern ===
Following the collapse of the communist system in the country, the far-right ideology became visible. The pan-Slavic and neopagan Polish National Union (PWN-PSN) political party at its peak was one of the larger groups active in the early 1990s, numbering then some 4,000 members and making international headlines for its anti-Semitism and anti-Catholicism in 1991 and 1992. The National Revival of Poland being a marginal political party, under the leadership of Adam Gmurczyk, operates since the late 1980s. It is a member of European National Front and a co-founder of International Third Position. The organization Association for Tradition and Culture "Niklot" was founded in 1998 by Tomasz Szczepanski, a former NOP member, promoting Slavic supremacy and neopaganism. Since the mid-1990s, the ultra-Catholic Radio Maryja station has been on air with an anti-modernist, nationalist and xenophobic program.

In 1995, the Anti-Defamation League estimated the number of far-right skinheads in Poland at 2,000, the fifth highest number after Germany, Hungary, the Czech Republic and the United States.

The League of Polish Families won 38 seats in 2001, and 34 in 2005. In 2015, entering parliament from the list of Kukiz'15, the far-right National Movement gained 5 seats out of Kukiz's 42. In April 2016, the National Movement leadership decided to break-off with Kukiz's movement, but only one MP followed the party's instructions. The ones that decided to stay with Kukiz'15, together with few other Kukiz's MPs, formed a parliamentary nationalist association called "National Democracy" (Endecja). The 2015 election was won by the Law and Justice party, which has been described as far-right by some, although it is also considered centre-right. It has been debated whether or not the party can be considered far-right, with political scientist Michael Minkerberg arguing that the party is "not a radical right party but right-wing populist".

Members of far-right groups take part in the annual "Independence March" in central Warsaw, which started in 2009, to mark Independence Day. About 60,000 were in the 2017 march marking the 99th anniversary of independence, with placards such as "Clean Blood" seen on the march. Over the years other placards or slogans have included "Pure Poland, white Poland" and “white Europe of brotherly nations”.

=== Neo-Nazism in Poland ===
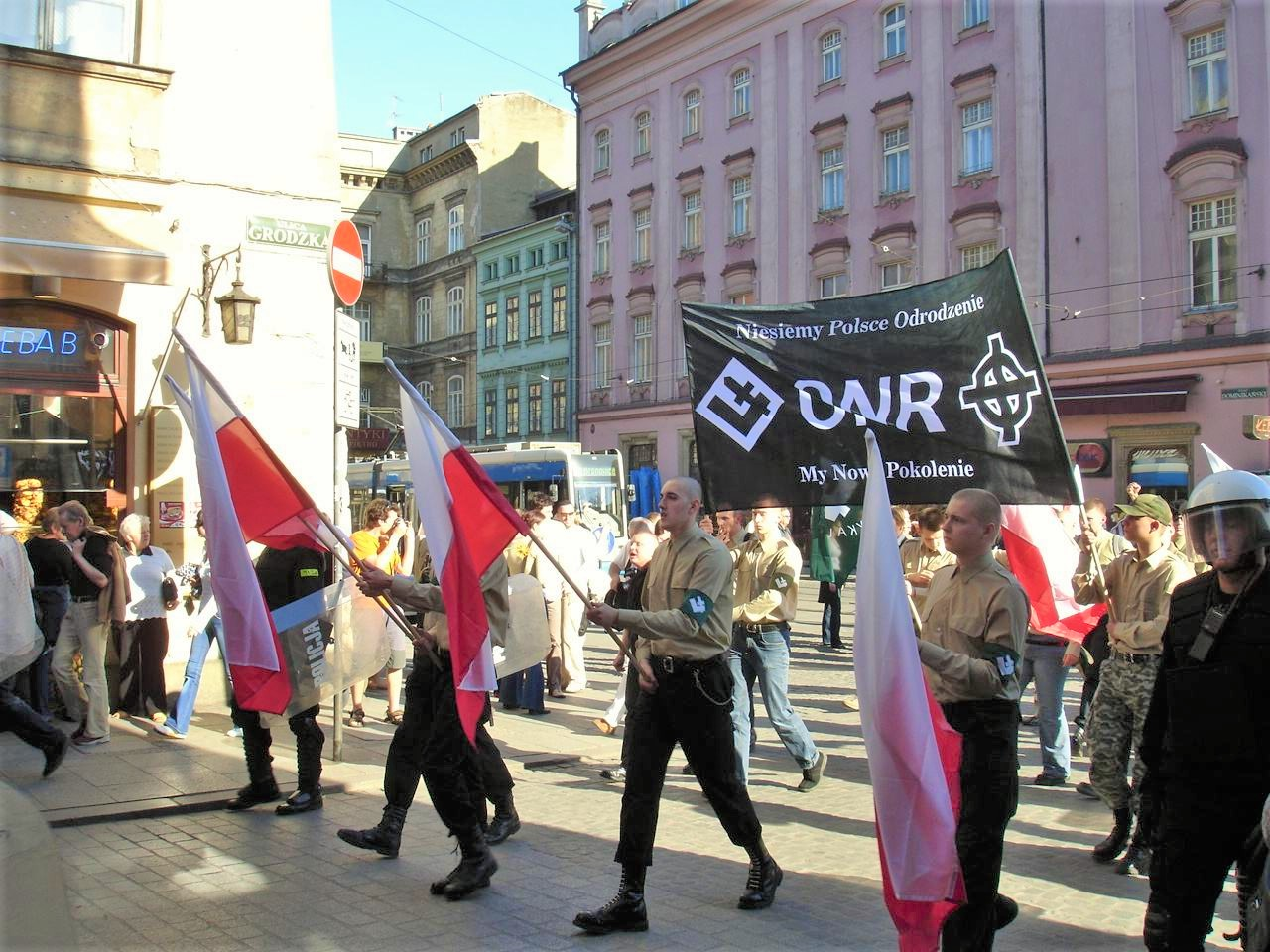
ONR employs imagery associated with Nazism: Uniformed skinheads, armbands and Celtic crosses

Under the Polish Constitution promoting any totalitarian system such as Nazism, fascism, or communism, as well as inciting violence and/or racial hatred is illegal. This was further re-enforced in the Polish Penal Code where discrediting any group or persons on national, religious, or racial grounds carries a sentence of 3 years.

Several far-right and anti-semitic organisations exist, most notably NOP and ONR (both of which exist legally) and while they are classified as fascist, they officially say they are adherents of "National Democracy" rather than Nazism. These groups attempt to frame their activities as "patriotic" rather than neo-Nazi, even while employing Nazi symbolism or rhetoric, such as the Roman salute, which they distinguish from the Nazi salute. However, Daniel Pładek, a sociologist at the Jagiellonian University and a researcher of the extreme right and Anti-Defamation League describe NOP and ONR as "Nazi-like" or outright neo-Nazi, despite their claims to the contrary. NOP was described as "overtly nazi" by anti-hate advocacy group Hope not Hate and NOP is connected to the banned neo-Nazi terrorist group National Action.

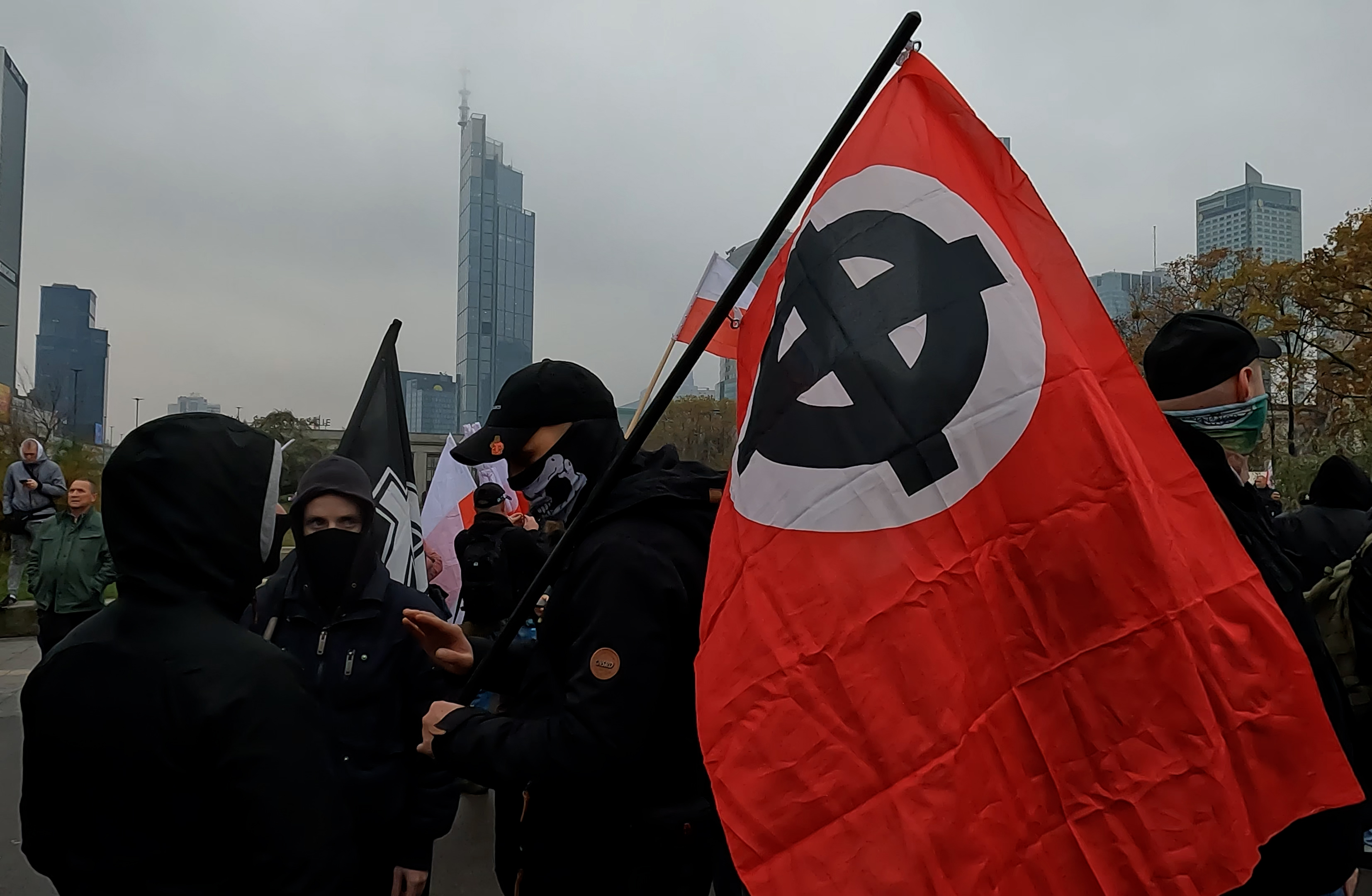
Polish neo-Nazis demonstrating, 2024

According to the ADL Self-Defence of the Republic of Poland-party that had at most 10% of the vote tolerates neo-Nazis among its ranks and its founder Andrzej Lepper has praised Adolf Hitler. For example, Self-Defense MP Mateusz Piskorski has translated the texts of the Order of Nine Angles leader David Myatt into Polish.

In addition to the fascist groups that tactically officially reject Nazism, there are several openly self-identified Nazi groups in Poland. For example, the Pride and Modernity-group organizes big events to celebrate the birthday of Adolf Hitler where they burn wooden swastikas. The neo-Nazi gang Bad Company threw a welcoming party for Janusz Waluś, a right-wing extremist who assassinated the anti-apartheid black activist Chris Hani. Polish neo-Nazis from Association of Independence Rota held an event at the German border, opposing refugees coming from the West. Szturmowcy (Stormtroopers) Nazi group held demonstrations, holding banners calling for a "White Europe". Polish Nazis from Zadrużny Krąg have also fought as part of the pagan neo-nazi Rusich Group. In addition to these examples, many other neo-Nazi groups exist, like the National Socialist Front, the Front for National Cleansing and the National-Socialist Congress.

Poland is also home to neo-Nazi bands such as Graveland and Honor. Reportedly an album by a neo-Nazi band named Legion sold over 30,000 copies even before the fall of the Iron Curtain.

Robert Winnicki's National Movement sponsored the November 2017 anti-Israel demonstration that was attended by 60,000 people. Algemeiner characterized the demonstration as "Ultranationalist and neo-Nazi". The All-Polish Youth is the unofficial youth group of the National Movement. The All-Polish Youth has also been linked to neo-Nazis and caused controversy when its members were saluting swastika flags and chanting "sieg heil".

According to several reporter investigations, the Polish government turns a blind eye to these groups, and they are free to spread their ideology, frequently dismissing their existence as conspiracy theories, dismissing acts political provocations, deeming them too insignificant to pose a threat, or attempting to justify or diminish the seriousness of their actions.

Former Polish ruling party Law and Justice (PiS) allegedly facilitated co-operation between conservative institutions and far-right extremists. In 2023, the PiS affiliated fundamentalist Catholic group Ordo Iuris started a campaign for the release of a neo-Nazi activist Marika Matuszak convicted of attacking an LGBT event, and she was released by PiS Justice Minister Zbigniew Ziobro. Sejm member and chair of the Together Party Adrian Zandberg criticized PiS Prime Minister Mateusz Morawiecki for "commemorat[ing] a unit that openly collaborated with the Gestapo" for paying tribute to the Holy Cross Mountains Brigade and said Hubert Jura may be a hero to Morawiecki, but not to him.

== Examples of influence ==
=== Islamophobia ===
There have been reports of hate crimes targeting Muslim minority in Poland. Far-right and right-wing populist political parties and organizations fuel fear and hatred towards Islam and Muslims. Hate crimes such as arson and physical violence have occurred in Poland (despite having a Muslim population of only 0.1%, that is 30,000 out of 38 million). Politicians have also made racist and anti-Muslim comments when discussing European migrant crisis; in 2015, Jarosław Kaczyński claimed that Poland "can't" accept any refugees because "they could spread infectious diseases." In 2017, the First Deputy Minister of Justice Patryk Jaki stated that "stopping Islamization is his Westerplatte".

=== After the 2015 elections ===
In May 2016, despite criticism from human rights NGOs, opposition parties and left-wing organizations, of the appeasement of the far-right, the right-wing government of Law and Justice (PiS) disbanded the governmental advisory and coordinating body that dealt with "racial discrimination, xenophobia and related to them, intolerance" (Rada ds. Przeciwdziałania Dyskryminacji Rasowej, Ksenofobii i związanej z nimi Nietolerancji), by claiming that its mission was "useless".

== See also ==
- Political parties in Poland
- Politics of Poland
- Confederation (political party)
- Radical right
- Janusz Waluś

== Bibliography ==
- Ronnie Ferguson, Luciano Cheles, Michalina Vaughan (eds.) The Far Right in Western and Eastern Europe, Longman (1995), ISBN 978-0-582-23881-7.
- David Ost, "The Radical Right in Poland", chapter 5 in: The Radical Right in Central and Eastern Europe Since 1989 (1999), ISBN 0-271-01811-9.
- Christina Schori Liang, Europe for the Europeans: The Foreign and Security Policy of the Populist, Ashgate Publishing (2007), ISBN 0-7546-4851-6.
