= National Radical Camp (1993) =

Political organisation in Poland

- Abbreviation: ONR
- Leader: Adrian Kaczmarkiewicz
- Secretary: Adrianna Gąsiorek
- Founded: 1993
- Headquarters: Ogrodowa 4/10; 42-200 Częstochowa
- Ideology: National radicalism; Polish nationalism; Neo-fascism; Anti-globalization; Hard Euroscepticism; Anti-communism; Anti-immigration; Anti-capitalism
- Political position: Far-right
- Religion: Roman Catholicism
- Colours: Green White

Party flag

Website
- https://www.onr.com.pl/

The National Radical Camp (Polish: Obóz Narodowo-Radykalny; ONR) is a radical right-wing and nationalist Polish political organisation following in its activities the organization of the same name that existed before the Second World War in Poland.

The current incarnation revived in 1993 is a far-right movement in Poland much like its historical predecessors. It is considered by some to be fascist and sometimes as neo-Nazi. As of 2012 it is registered as a common-interest association.

The ONR considers itself an ideological descendant of the 1930s-era National Radical Camp, an ultranationalist, patriotic, and antisemitic political movement which existed in the pre-World War II Second Polish Republic, an illegal Polish anti-communist, and nationalist political party formed on 14 April 1934 mostly by the youth radicals who left the National Party of the National Democracy movement.

== Ideology ==
The modern National Radical Camp, like its predecessors, is fascist. The United Nations Committee for the Elimination of Racial Discrimination considers the organization a fascist group promoting racial and national hatred and has called on Poland to de-legalize it by enforcing its constitutional ban on such groups. In 2021, Poland’s Supreme Court ruled that the National Radical Camp could be called fascist.

The party flag of the organization was included in the police handbook as an explicitly racist symbol and has made usage of the Celtic Cross, an old symbol appropriated by neo-Nazis. The Interior Ministry subsequently pulled the book from circulation after a complaint from MP Adam Andruszkiewicz.

In 2015, an ONR demonstration ended with the burning of an effigy of an ultra-Orthodox Jew. Proceedings were opened for violating laws against "insulting people based on religion, ethnicity, race or nationality".

In 2019, the Lublin-Południe District Prosecutor's Office opened proceedings against ONR for "public propagation of a totalitarian regime" after they published a Tweet celebrating Belgian fascist and SS officer Léon Degrelle.

== Marches ==
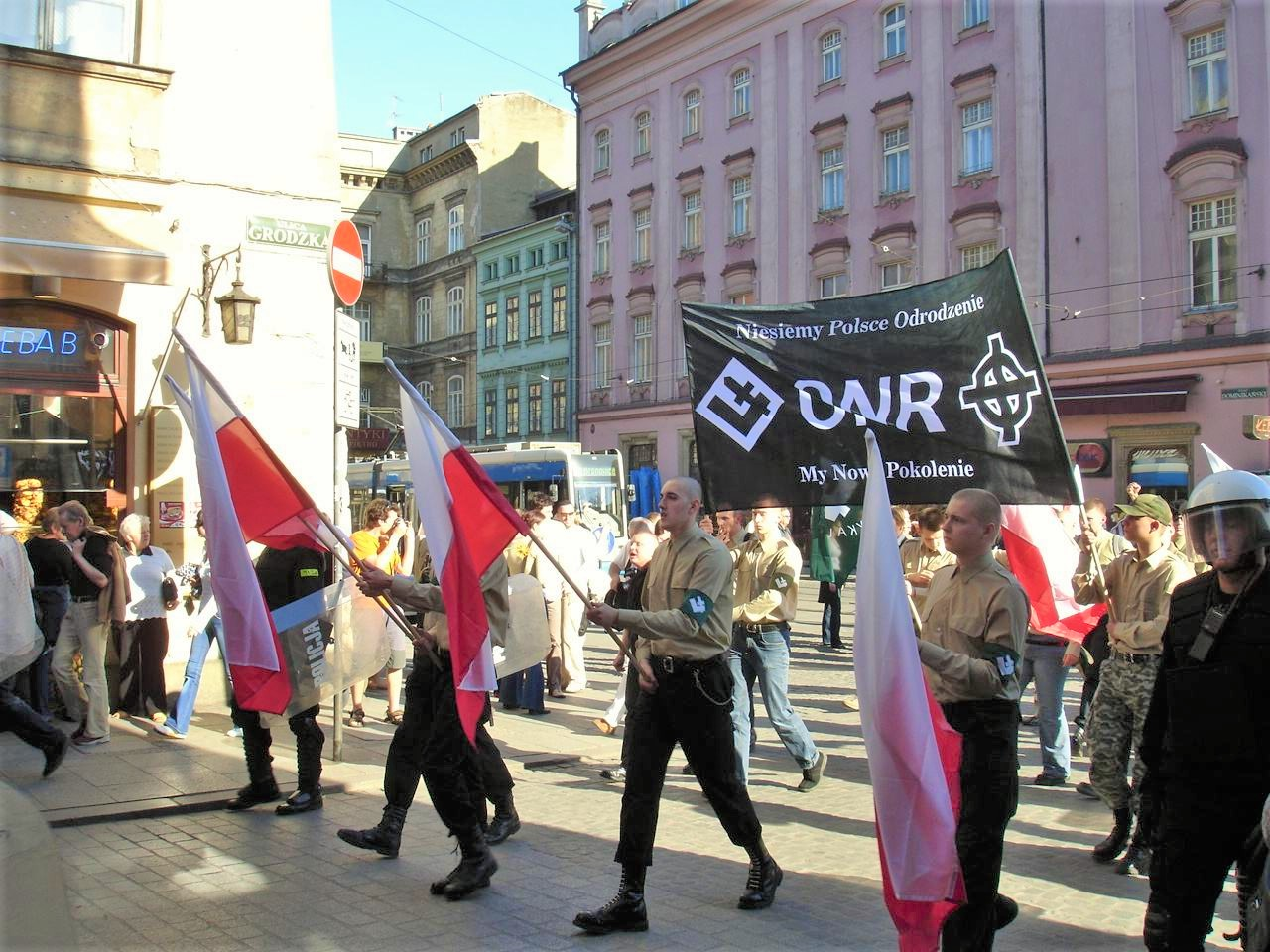
ONR march in Kraków, July 2007. The banner carries the inscription "Niesiemy Polsce Odrodzenie My Nowe Pokolenie" ("We, the new generation, bring rebirth to Poland").

=== Myślenice rallies ===
ONR attracted publicity in 2005, 2007, 2008 and 2009 for unauthorized marches during the anniversary of the anti-Jewish riot in Myślenice in 1936. In 2005 the group had a couple of hundred members.

An illegal rally held on June 30, 2007 resulted in a court case, in which the ONR leader, Wojciech Mazurkiewicz, was acquitted only because the magistrate warning was issued too late, according to the presiding judge. The 2008 rally led by the same ONR leader was taped by police with the intention of sharing the video with the local prosecutors office according to Lesser Poland Police.

ONR members at a 2008 rally in Myślenice made a Roman salute before disbanding. When questioned by reporters at the scene, the ONR leader claimed it is different from the Nazi salute.

=== Independence Day marches ===
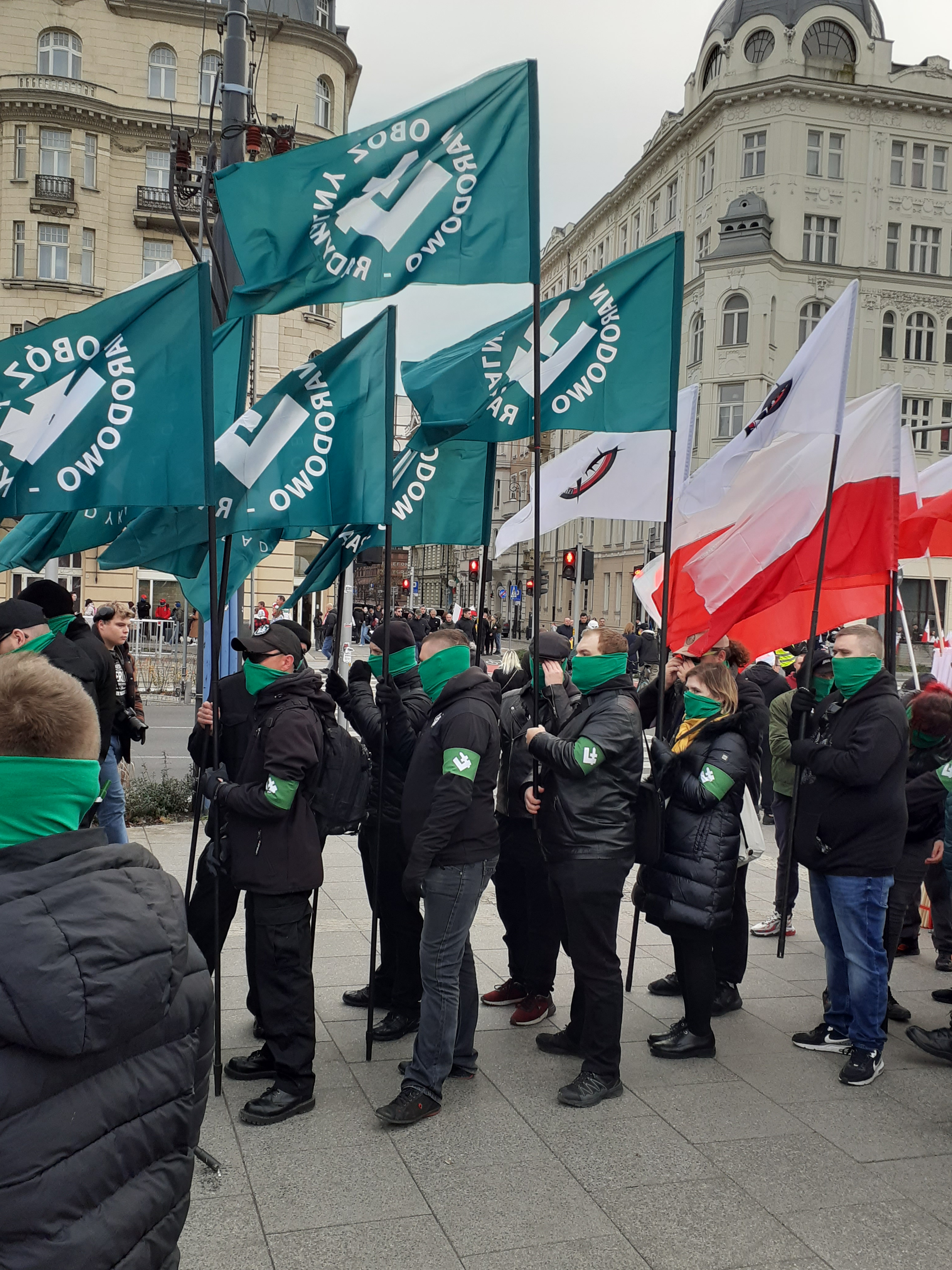
ONR flags carried during the Independence March in 2022

The association has also been known as initiators of marches during the National Independence Day of Poland. One of them (in Warsaw), as a co-initiative of several different nationalist movements in 2010, evolved in 2012 into one of the biggest events during the day, which now attracts a more diverse community. Since 2012, it has been organized by a registered association which was founded and is co-chaired by ONR.

On 11 November 2017, 60,000 people marched in an Independence Day celebration procession co-organized by the ONR along with the All-Polish Youth. People from the group "Black Block", which consisted of associations "Niklot" and "Szturmowcy", carried banners that read "White Europe", "Europe Will Be White" and "Clean Blood". There were also others who were chanting "Death to enemies of the homeland" and "Catholic Poland, not secular". Foreign guests included self-identified Italian fascist Roberto Fiore, Slovak neo-Nazi MP Milan Mazurek, and several members of Hungary's far-right Jobbik party. American white supremacist Richard Spencer planned to speak at the march, but was banned from doing so, with the Ministry announcing in a later statement that Spencer's views were "in conflict with the legal order of Poland". The march was cited in a European Parliament resolution that called for member states to act decisively against far-right extremism.

For the march in 2018, the Italian neo-fascist party Forza Nuova was invited. Far-right activists and groups from Hungary, Estonia, Belarus, Spain, Italy, the Netherlands, USA and Portugal joined the event in 2021 and formed the "Nationalistic Column" with Polish far-right organizations and movements, including but not limited to: "Trzecia Droga", "Szturmowcy"", Autonomiczni Nacjonaliści, All-Polish Youth, National Rebirth of Poland and the ONR.
