= Robert Winnicki =

Polish politician

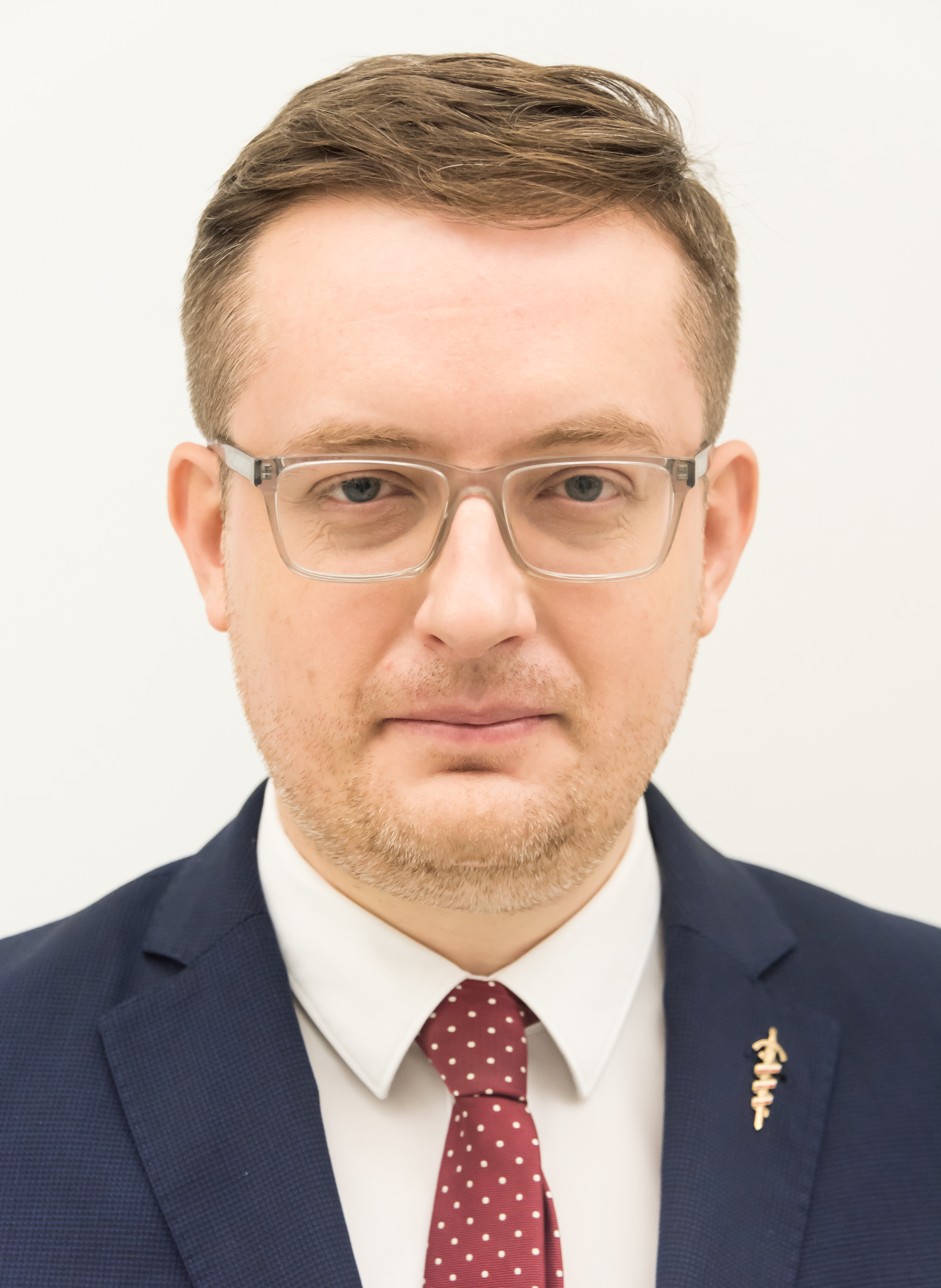
- Portrait of Winnicki wearing the Mieczyk Chrobrego symbol as a lapel pin, 2023

Chairman of the National Movement
- In office 10 December 2014 – 11 May 2023
- Succeeded by: Krzysztof Bosak

Chairman of the All-Polish Youth
- In office 10 March 2009 – 13 April 2013

Member of the Sejm
- In office 12 November 2019 – 12 November 2023
- Constituency: 24-Białystok
- In office 12 November 2015 – 11 November 2019
- Constituency: 1-Legnica

Personal details
- Born: 18 July 1985 (age 41) Skrzydlice, Jelenia Góra Voivodeship, Polish People's Republic
- Party: National Movement; Confederation

Robert Artur Winnicki (born 18 July 1985) is a Polish former politician who served as a member of the Sejm between 2015–2023. He was the head of the National Movement (RN) political party between 2015–2023.

Before entering politics, Winnicki worked as a journalist. He served as a chairman of the far-right All-Polish Youth from 2009 to 2013. In 2012, he founded the RN and in 2015, he was first elected in the 2015 Polish parliamentary election running as the main candidate on the list of Kukiz'15 in the 1-Legnica constituency. He was re-elected to the Sejm in 2019, this time running as the main candidate on the list of Confederation Liberty and Independence (KWiN) in the 24-Białystok constituency.

== Biography ==
Winnicki attended but did not graduate from the University of Wrocław where he studied political science. After his studies he worked in real estate and managed a hotel. He also worked as a journalist. His first political campaign was in 2007 when he unsuccessfully ran in the 2007 Polish parliamentary election as a candidate for the League of Polish Families (LPR). However, his political profile became well known and he was elected Chairman of the All-Polish Youth in 2009 and served until 2013. His tenure as chairman was the second longest in the Third Polish Republic and through his leadership the organization grew despite the collapse of the LPR. After his tenure ended he was the given the title of honorary chairman.

In 2011, he worked with other nationalist groups to form and officially organize the Independence March, a manifestation that would take place annually on 11 November, the anniversary of Poland's independence. The march went from being a marginal event to the single biggest annual march in the country. It has created mass controversy abroad.

In 2012 he co-founded the RN, which was formed to replace the LPR and the many other fringe nationalist parties which had come and gone through the years. In 2014 it was officially registered as a party and Winnicki became its first chairman.

In 2018, Winnicki and Janusz Korwin-Mikke announced that their parties will be forming a coalition ahead of the elections coming up in 2019. KWiN was formed and officially registered the following year.

Winnicki temporarily retired from party politics in May 2023 due to cardiac issues and has appeared as a political commentator since early 2025.
