= All-Polish Youth =

All-Polish Youth Młodzież Wszechpolska
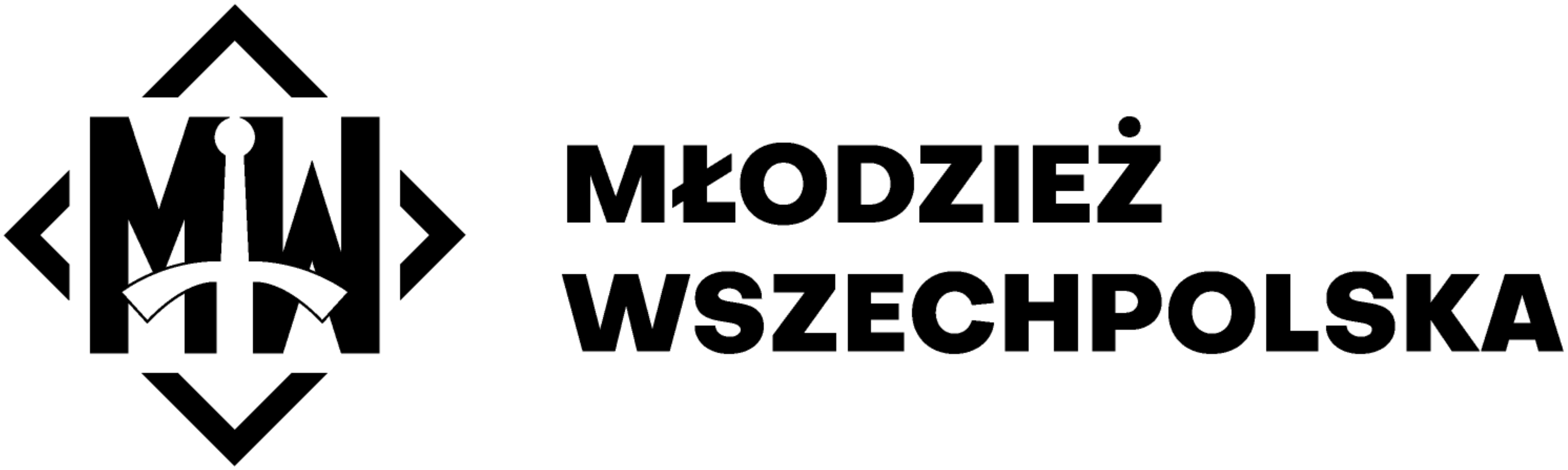
- Leader: Marcin Osowski
- Secretary: Kinga Dubrawska
- Spokesperson: Adam Leszczyński
- Deputy Leader: Mateusz Janik; Milena Górska-Hołyst
- Founders: Roman Dmowski (original incarnation); Roman Giertych (revived, current incarnation)
- Founded: 26 March 1922 (original incarnation as the All-Polish Youth Academic Union); 2 December 1989 (revived, current incarnation)
- Dissolved: 1947 (original incarnation)
- Headquarters: ul. Stawki 4b/lok. U1, Warsaw, 03-193
- Ideology: Polish nationalism Ultranationalism; National Catholicism; Political Catholicism; Hard Euroscepticism
- Political position: Far-right
- Colours: Black, green and white
- Slogan: Youth! Faith! Nationalism!
- Anthem: Hymn Młodych

Party flag
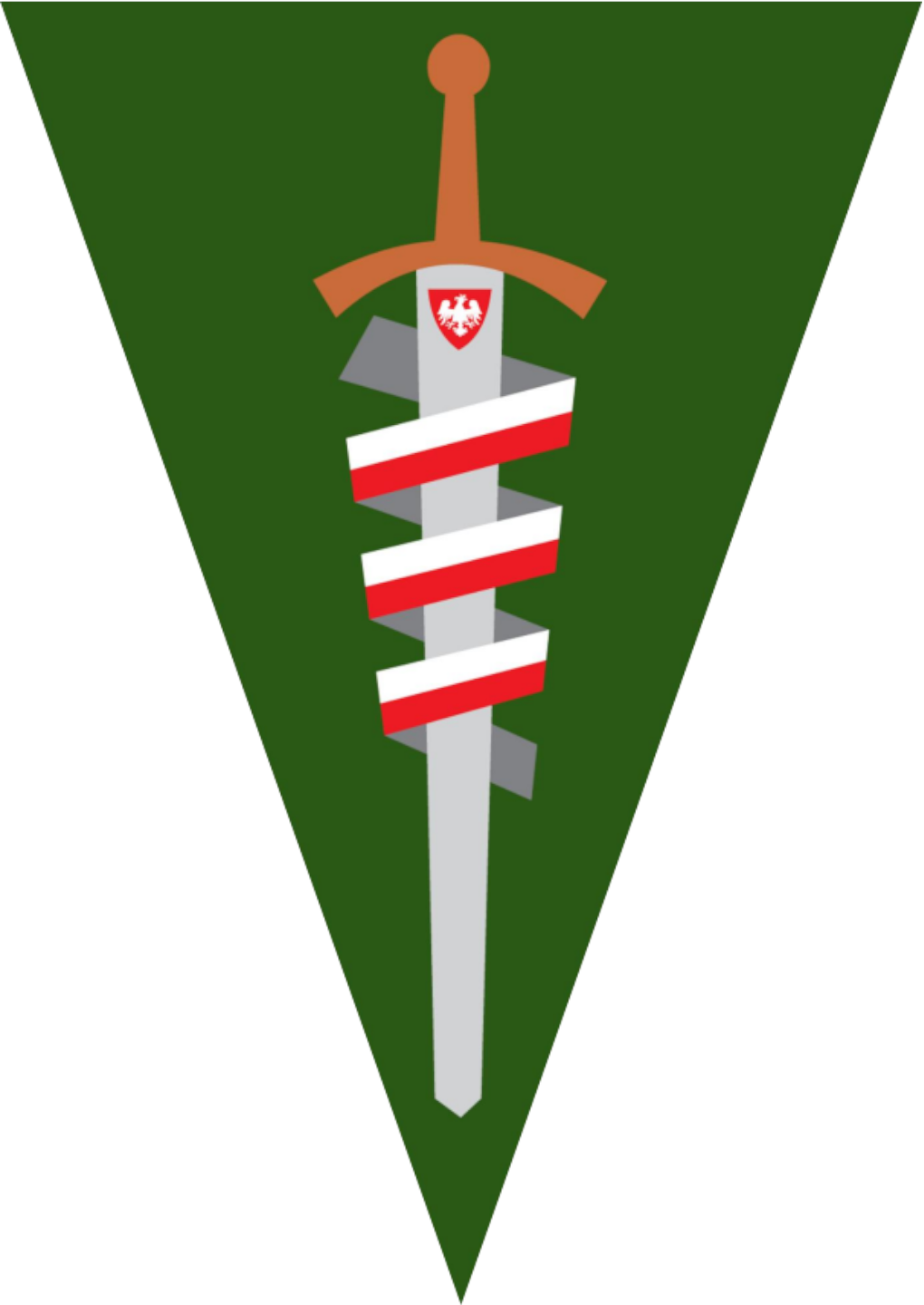

Website
- mw.org.pl

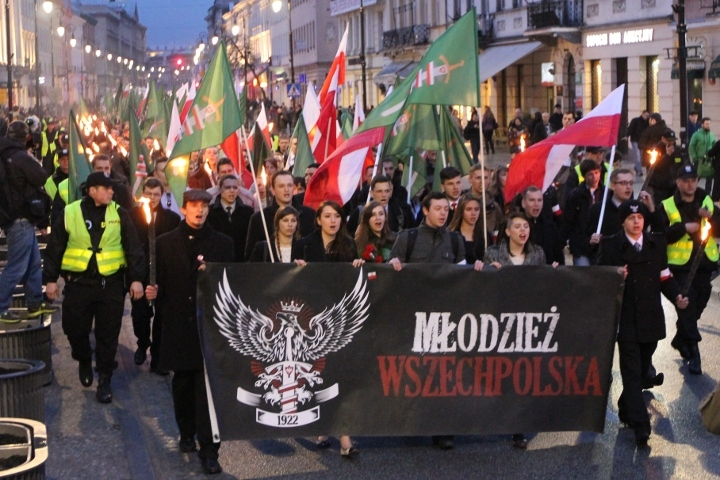
March of All-Polish Youth in 2013

The All-Polish Youth (Polish: Młodzież Wszechpolska) refers to two inter-linked Polish far-right ultranationalist youth organizations, with a Catholic-nationalist philosophy. Its agenda declares that its aim is "to raise Polish youth in a Catholic and patriotic spirit".

The inter-war incarnation was created in 1922 as part of the National Democracy movement, and was modelled after the inter-war national-syndicalist movement Falanga. During World War II it operated underground and was clamped down on the break of 1945/1946 by the Provisional Government of National Unity.

The present incarnation was created on 2 December 1989. Its manifesto from 1989 states that "one's country is the greatest earthly good. After God, your foremost love belongs to the Homeland, and foremost after God you must serve your own country," and declares itself opposed to "doctrines promoting liberalism, tolerance, and relativism."

The All-Polish Youth was affiliated with the League of Polish Families (2001–2006), but was never officially its youth wing. In the 21st century it has been a fierce opponent of LGBT rights leading it to be widely condemned as homophobic by various organisations.

The All-Polish Youth has a strong alliance with National Movement party, but is independent and not part of the party.

== Term "All-Polish" ==
The term all-Polish was coined by Jan Ludwik Popławski and was synonymous to Polish nationalism as a whole. It signified the struggle to unite Poland into one country (as its territory had been partitioned and seized by the Habsburg monarchy, the Kingdom of Prussia, and the Russian Empire and the country did not formally exist for 123 years). It also emphasized the importance of relations within the nation, as well as the equal status of all citizens with Polish nationality, regardless of their social and economic backgrounds.

== Inter-war All-Polish Youth ==
The organisation, properly the Academic Union "All-Polish Youth" (Związek Akademicki "Młodzież Wszechpolska"), was founded in 1922 as an ideological youth organisation with a strong nationalist sentiment, and was the largest student organisation in the Second Polish Republic. The Founding Convention of the All-Polish youth took place in March 1922, with Roman Dmowski being selected honorary chairman.

The term "All-Polish" is intended to represent a desire to unify all Polish lands, and accentuate national ties and the equality of all people of Polish origin regardless of their wealth or social status. The idea for creating the organization occurred when Poland was partitioned and not officially on the world map, therefore it aimed to unite Poles from all three partitions. In the inter-war period, members of the organisation participated actively in academic life, and became the heads of many student organisations. The All-Polish Youth was the largest student organization in Poland during the 1930s. The goals of the organization were mainly focused on three issues:

1. Defending the autonomy of universities against centralising forces of the government
2. Campaigning for lower tuition fees
3. Limitation of non-Polish, especially Jewish students, from higher education

All-Polish Youth was the least radical of organizations of the National Democracy camp. Nevertheless, some of its members praised Mussolini and his Italian fascism for its hardline stances towards the left and realisation of "national revolution". Part of the members, including Jędrzej Giertych, also praised Hitler's Germany economical changes, but understood that it is with the contradiction with Polish national interests and changed his views a year after NSDAP obtained power in Germany. According to Jan Mosdorf, a pre-war chairman of All-Polish Youth who was murdered in Auschwitz, the organization was against fascists and Hitlerites. Some Members of the All-Polish Youth also praised authoritarian regimes of the Mediterranean, Salazar's Portugal and Franco's Spain.

They also favoured economically boycotting the Jews and limiting their access to higher education (numerus clausus). The All-Polish Youth also actively campaigned for ghetto benches, segregated seating for Jewish students.

== Modern days ==
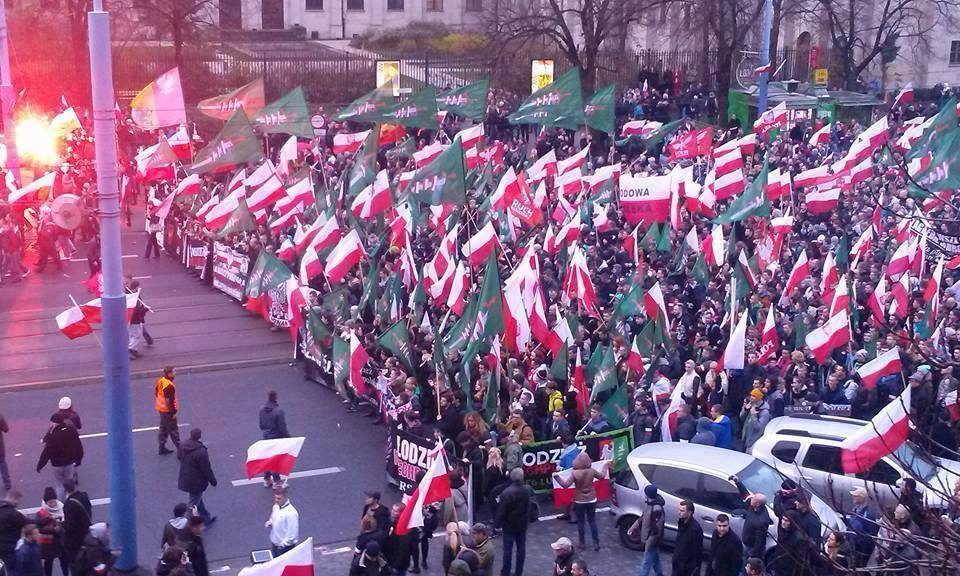
All-Polish Youth on 2015 March of Independence

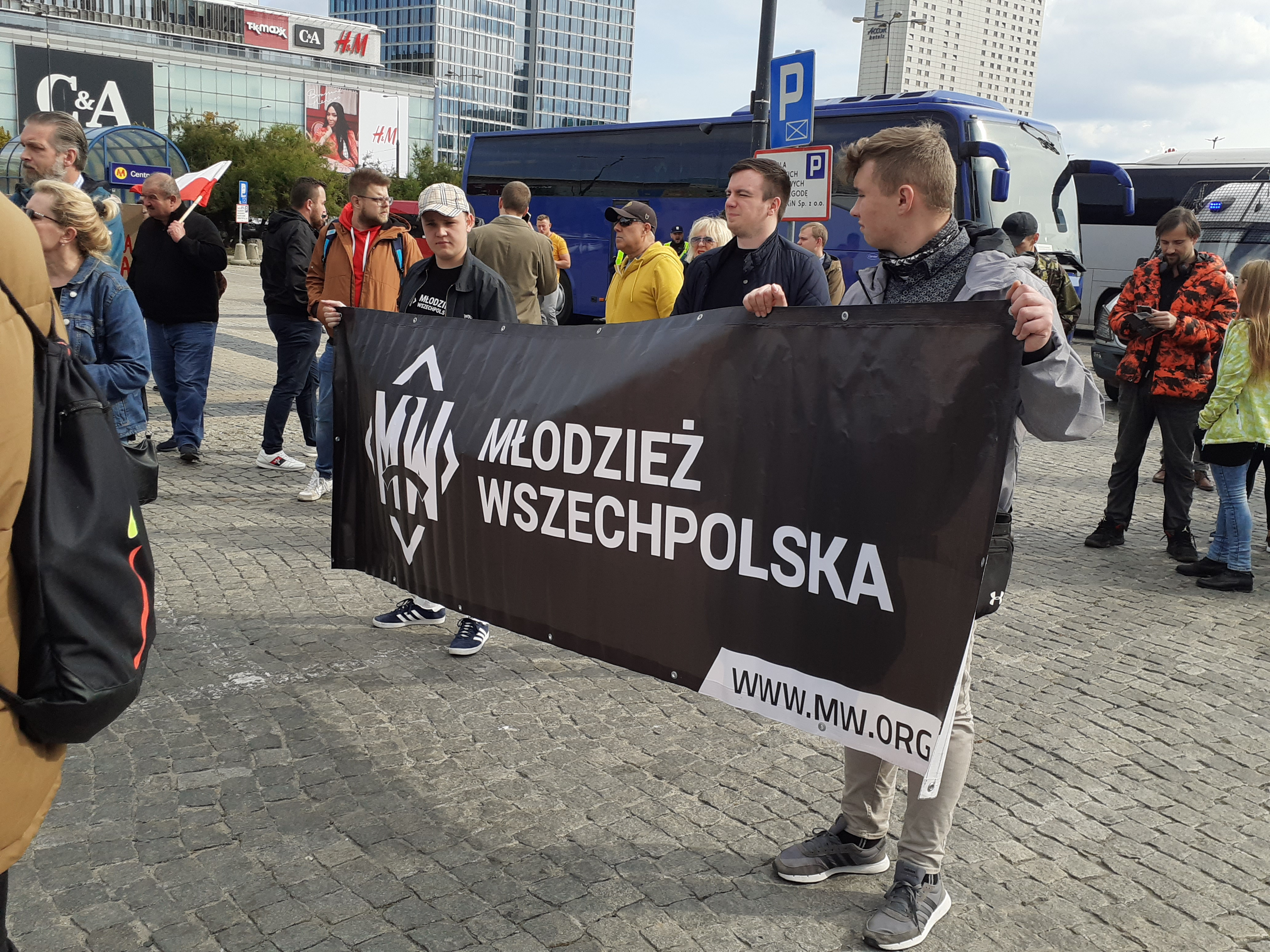
All-Polish Youth in 2022.

The modern incarnation of the All-Polish Youth was founded in Poznań in 1989, on the initiative of Roman Giertych, the former leader of the League of Polish Families (LPR). Continuing the tradition of its precursors, the organisation maintains its aim of raising youth with their ideology, and operates across all of Poland, working with high-school and university students.

In 2006, the Polish Public Prosecutor's office launched an investigation after a video recording from a private party was leaked to the Polish press. It was considered that All-Polish Youth members including Leokadia Wiącek, a personal assistant of Maciej Giertych (member of the European Parliament), were seen fraternizing with Neo-Nazi skinheads, listening to Neo-Nazi bands, and saluting the swastika. Following the incident, Leokadia Wiącek was expelled from All-Polish Youth, and the League of Polish Families cut ties with the group. As it was later determined, during the private party Leokodia Wącek was not a member of the organisation and the main Polish television channel Telewizja Polska apologized to All-Polish Youth for accusing them of neo-Nazi connotations.

All-Polish Youth have declared that it is only by making Poland a Catholic state that its future will be secured, and chairman Konrad Bonisławski has stated "We do not want to become like Holland with its free drugs and gay marriage. Since joining the European Union we have seen attempts to destroy our Catholic values."

All-Polish Youth have gained considerable press coverage due to their staunch opposition of abortion and, particularly, homosexuality (which their website condemns as "unnatural behaviour" and describes gay rights marches as "militant homosexualism"). This has led to (sometimes violent) clashes with pro-choice and gay rights demonstrators.

All-Polish Youth have been widely condemned as homophobic by various organisations including Amnesty International, Human Rights Watch, and even the United Nations (which, in their Universal Periodic Review, describes All-Polish Youth as an "extremist homophobic grouping"), as well as a multitude of gay rights organisations such as OutRage! and the Polish Campaign Against Homophobia. In 2004, 2005, and 2006, All-Polish Youth members and sympathizers violently attacked people who were taking part in pro-gay demonstrations, throwing eggs, bottles and rocks at them, and were reported to have shouted "Send the fags to the hospital", "Perverts, get out of Kraków", "Let's gas the fags" and "We'll do to you what Hitler did to the Jews".

From 2012 onwards, the organisation has been heavily involved in playing a major role as part of the National Movement party, a party which the organisation was one of the several co-founders.

In January 2019, the organisation's leader from 2015 to 2016, Adam Andruszkiewicz, was appointed as Poland's deputy minister for digital affairs.

Former member (joined 2000), Lubusz chapter leader (2003–2004) and chairman (2005 and 2006) Krzysztof Bosak became the Confederate Party candidate for the presidential election 2020 after winning the presidential primaries held at the party convention in Warsaw on January 18, 2020.

In August 2019, the Committee on the Elimination of Racial Discrimination called the Polish government to delegalize and criminalize All-Polish Youth (along with several others) for promoting and inciting racial discrimination.

== Ideology ==
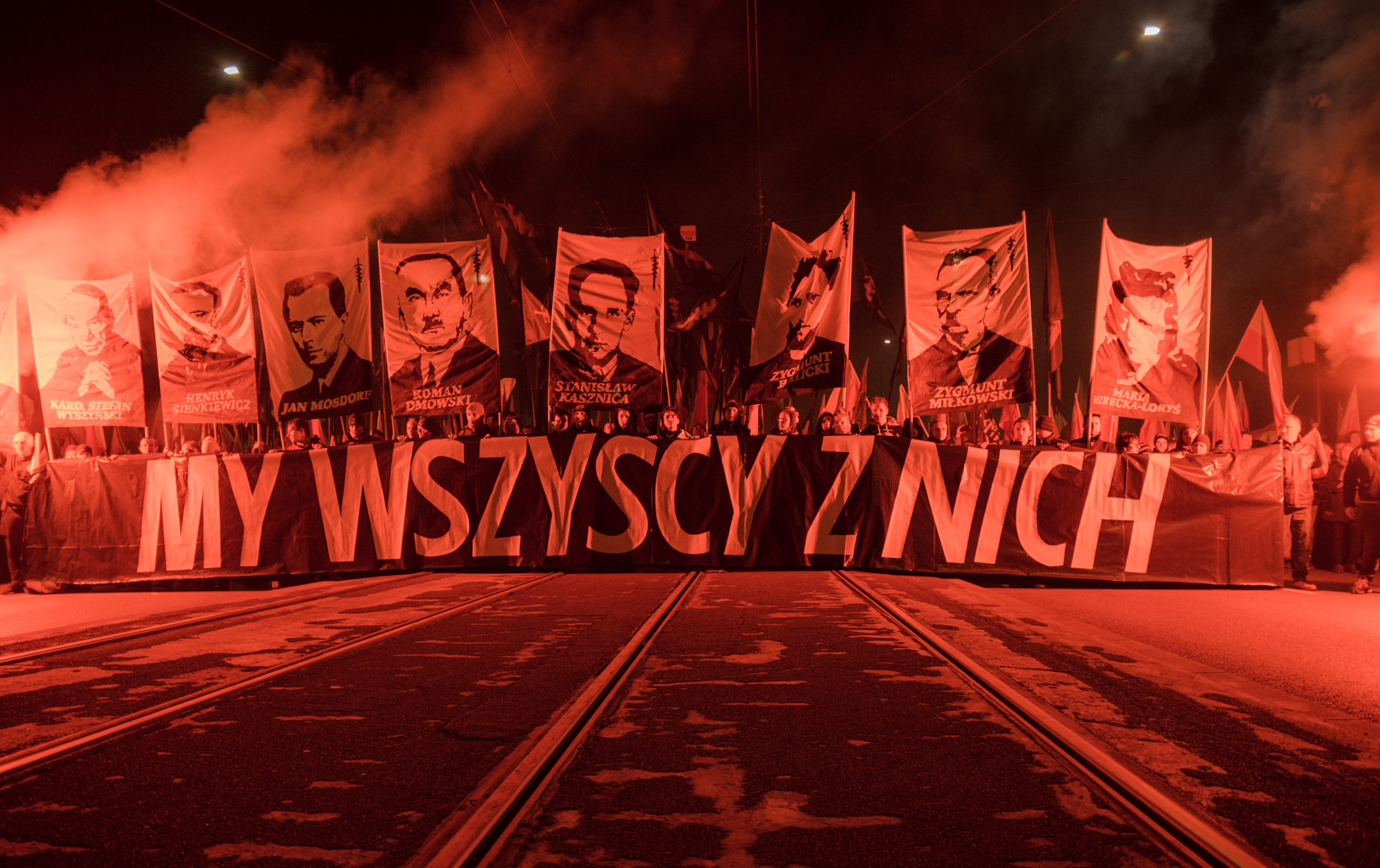
All-Polish Youth during 2018 Independence March

The All-Polish Youth is a nationalist and Catholic organization. It states that it recognizes God as the highest of all universal principles and deems the Catholic Church as the nation's mentor and the only way of pursuing holiness. Members of the All-Polish Youth highlight the purported need to ensure due respect to the Church, as well as its position within the State. According to the organization's 1989 manifesto, they claim that the Catholic ethic should be irrevocable both in public and private spheres of life. The organization advocates for the development of the Catholic State of the Polish Nation which should "become a pillar of the Western culture based upon Christian principles". The All-Polish Youth considers the notion of a nation to be understood as "a community united by faith, history, culture, land, speech, and customs, to be the most prominent of the earthly values".

The All-Polish Youth perceives the state as a necessary form of social coexistence, which politically engages the nation's members, and argues that its improvement should be permanently cared for. According to the organization, family means "oneness of faith and blood and is supposed to be a keystone of tradition and mores". Members of the All-Polish Youth believe that family should be protected from what they describe as "moral threats", and that families shall should receive support in both (undefined) material and spiritual respect. They claim that culture should be "a spiritual right of the nation's life and a proof of spirit's superiority over materiality and that it shall be cared for and maintained as such".

The All-Polish Youth opposes "doctrines which preach arbitrariness," such as liberalism, relativism and tolerance. The organization is characterized by hard Euroscepticism. Its members claim to stand for national solidarity and disapprove of class warfare. In terms of economy, it approves of common private ownership and denounces buyout of national wealth by foreign capital.

In April 2025, the Never Again Association released a report on praising the racist killer Janusz Waluś by the far-right in Poland. According to this report, the All-Polish Youth has long publicly supported Waluś, among others, on social media and during street demonstrations. For example, All-Polish Youth published a video glorifying the assassination of Chris Hani: “Janusz Waluś is a hero who saved many existences by his actions, slowing down the South African criminal communism!”

== Activity ==
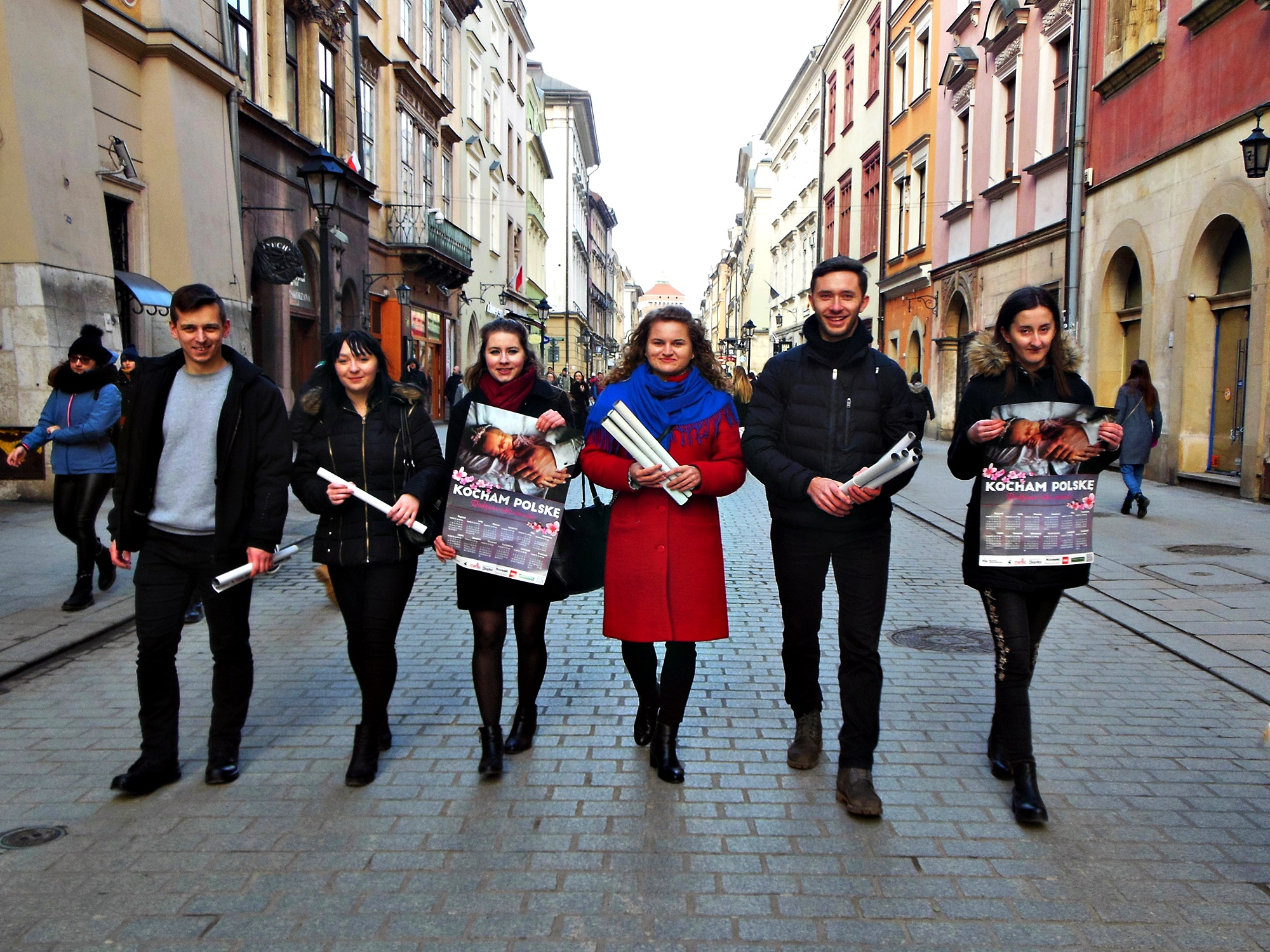
Campaign "I Love Poland"

According to its statute, the All-Polish Youth is a community-minded organization aimed at rearing its members, most of them being high school or university students, using nationalist and Catholic virtues. The All-Polish Youth is the mastermind or co-organizer of such periodically reoccurring initiatives as:

- Independence March (Polish: Marsz Niepodległości) – an annual manifestation taking place since 2010 in order to celebrate the Polish National Independence Day (11.11).

The All-Polish Youth was one of the initiators of the event. It regularly participates in the manifestation that has been increasingly associated with far-right extremism. In 2021, far-right activists and groups from Hungary, Estonia, Belarus, Spain, Italy, the Netherlands, USA and Portugal joined the event and joined the "Nationalistic Column" formed by Polish far-right organizations and movements, including but not limited to: "Trzecia Droga", "Szturmowcy", Autonomiczni Nacjonaliści, the National Radical Camp (ONR), All-Polish Youth, National Rebirth of Poland (NOP).

- "I Love Poland" (Polish: Kampania Społeczna "Kocham Polskę") – a social campaign aimed at promoting modern-day patriotism, celebrating the anniversary of the formation of the Home Army. The All-Polish Youth finds Valentine's Day to be a highly commercialized holiday, so they work to turn the tables and use this day to turn Poles' attention towards the need to love their Fatherland.
- "A Helpful Hand" (Polish: "Pomocna dłoń") – an initiative established to help freshmen students overcome difficulties typically associated with starting education at a university.
- "Buy what's Polish" (Polish: "Kupuj Polskie") – a social campaign which is usually carried out before Christmas and Easter. Its main goal is to promote consumer patriotism, as well as to make Poles aware of the benefits resulting from buying Polish products.
- Picket "In the Name of the Ladies" (Polish: Pikieta "W imieniu dam") – a protest organized in cooperation with the National Women's Organization on International Women's Day. The demonstration's main purpose is to promote traditional values and voice condemnation of abortion and sexualization of the public sphere of life.

The All-Polish Youth publishes their own magazine titled Wszechpolak (a word formed from the organization's name, referring to an active member of it) and runs their own web portal Narodowcy.net. It also used to organize a March of Tradition and Culture (Polish: Marsz Tradycji i Kultury) as a way of expressing discontent with LGBT organizations and their manifestations. Additionally, the All-Polish Youth initiated such happenings as "A Polish flag in a Polish household" (Polish: "Polska flaga w polskim domu") and "School Strike" (Polish: "Strajk szkolny"; a protest against limiting the syllabus on history lessons during the second Cabinet of Donald Tusk).

== Leaders ==
- Roman Giertych (2 December 1989 – 1994)
- Damian Pukacki (1994–1995)
- Dariusz Wasilewski (1995–1997)
- Piotr Sosiński (February 1997 – 23 October 1999)
- Wojciech Wierzejski (23 October 1999 – 24 June 2000)
- Maciej Twaróg (24 June 2000 – 15 July 2002)
- Piotr Ślusarczyk (15 July 2002 – 7 February 2004)
- Radosław Parda (7 February 2004 – 16 April 2005)
- Marcin Kubiński (16 April 2005 – 7 November 2005)
- Krzysztof Bosak (7 November 2005 – 17 December 2006)
- Konrad Bonisławski (17 December 2006 – 14 March 2009)
- Robert Winnicki (14 March 2009 – 13 April 2013)
- Tomasz Pałasz (13 April 2013 – 21 March 2015)
- Adam Andruszkiewicz (21 March 2015 – 2 July 2016)
- Bartosz Berk (2 July 2016 – 14 April 2018)
- Ziemowit Przebitkowski (14 April 2018 - 26 March 2022)
- Marcin Kowalski (26 March 2022 – 14 September 2024)
- Marcin Osowski (since 14 September 2024)

== See also ==
- Polish YMCA
- Hitler Youth
