= Adam Andruszkiewicz =

Polish politician (born 1990)

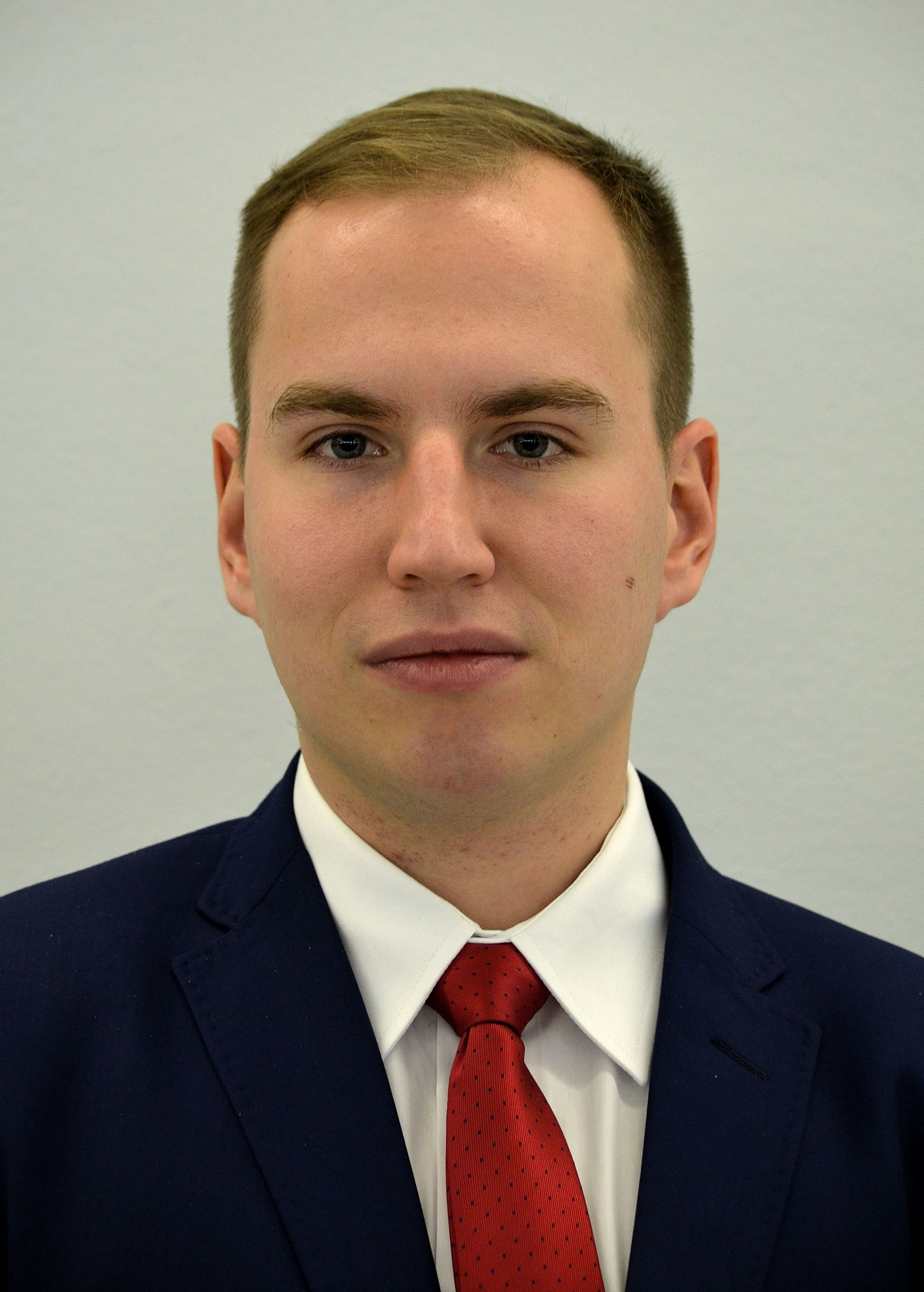
- Official portrait, 2015

Member of the Sejm
- In office 12 November 2015 – 7 August 2025
- Constituency: 24 Białystok

Personal details
- Born: 30 June 1990 (age 36) Grajewo, Poland
- Party: Law and Justice (since 2018)
- Other political affiliations: Free and Solidary (2018); National Movement (until 2018)
- Education: University of Białystok
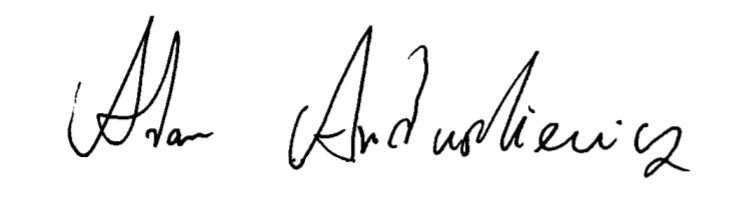
- Signature

Adam Andruszkiewicz (born 30 June 1990 in Grajewo) is a far-right Polish politician, who has been the president of the All-Polish Youth (Polish: Młodzież Wszechpolska) from 2015 to 2016, member of the Sejm, president of the Stowarzyszenie Endecja and vice president of the Komisja Łączności z Polakami za Granicą (English: Commission on Communications with Poles Living Abroad).

Andruszkiewicz used to be in the National Movement and leader of the nationalist All-Polish Youth, but he left these organizations in 2018 to join Free and Solidary and, later, Law and Justice.

== Career ==
In 2015 Andruszkiewicz showed his support for the Prime Minister candidate, Paweł Kukiz.

In 2018 he left the Kukiz 15 movement and later joined the Free and Solidary.

In 2018 he was appointed as the vice Minister of Digitization (Poland).
