= Polish YMCA =

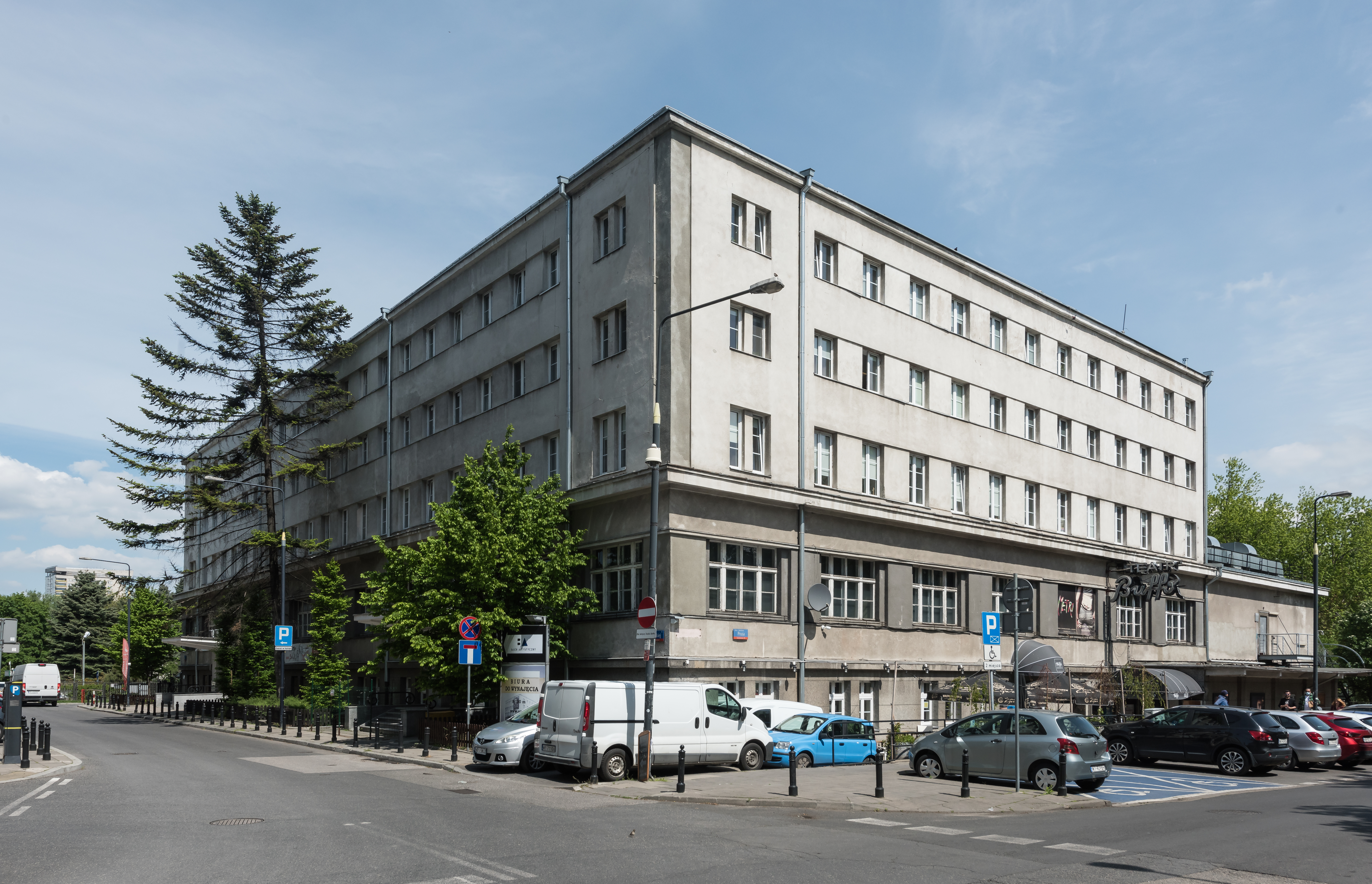
YMCA building in Warsaw

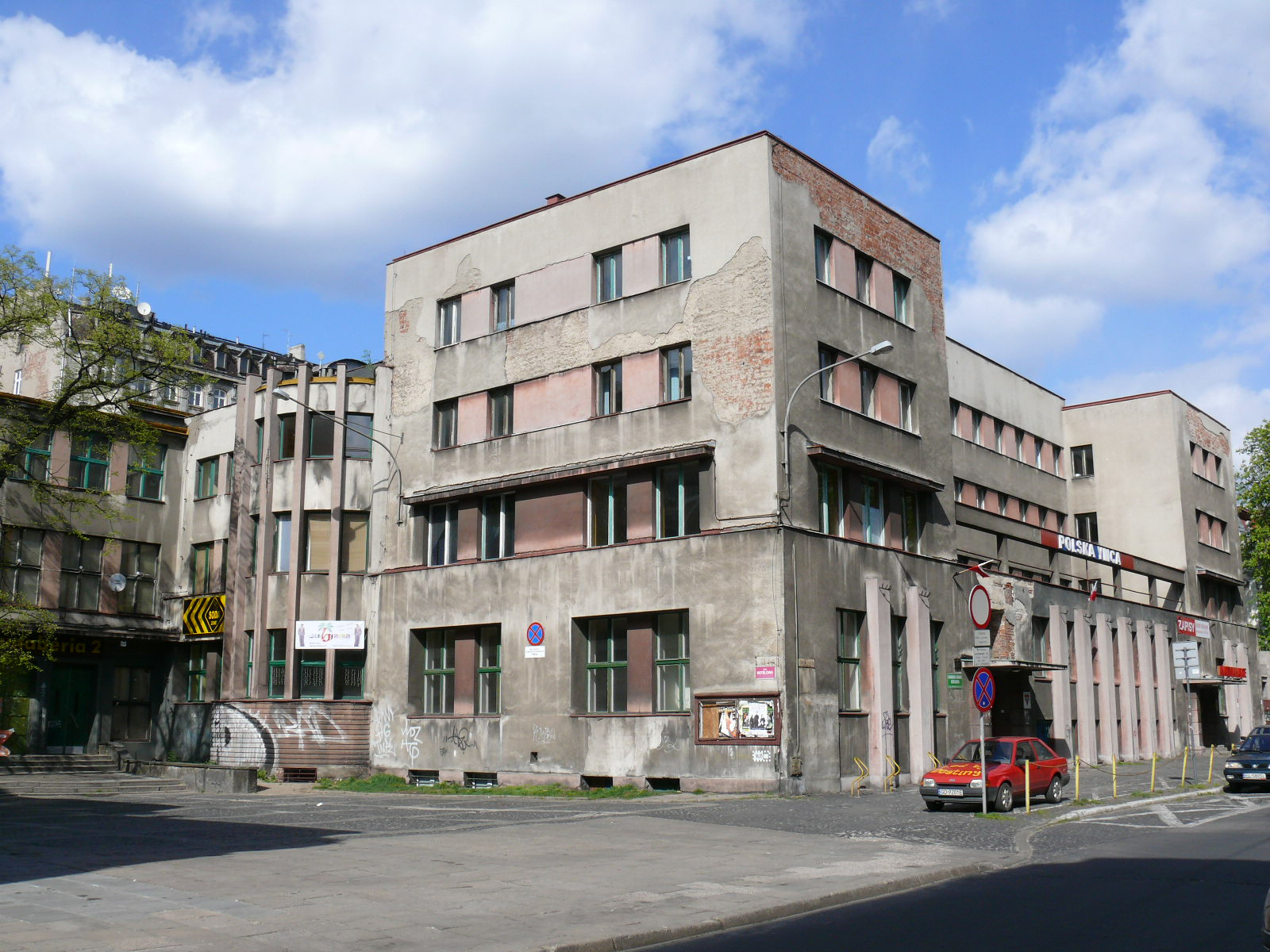
YMCA Łódź

Związek Młodzieży Chrześcijańskiej (Christian Young People Association), also known as the Polish YMCA, is a youth social organization, based on the international organizations that YMCA built. It encourages good conduct, charity and education, and activities based on Christian morals. People of both sexes can be members.

== History ==
The American YMCA came to Poland with General Józef Haller's army during World War I. The main aim was to serve soldiers and prisoners of war. After the war the YMCA continued to work with students, children and poor people. And, with the help of the American YMCA, Poles started to build their own YMCA, which was founded formally in 1923.

Before World War II, the YMCA worked in many cities in Poland. Three campsites and four buildings (in Kraków, Łódź, Warsaw and Gdynia) were built with the help of the American YMCA. The YMCA houses had rooms for residents, common rooms, gyms, and swimming pools. Sport and camping played a main role in its programme. Young people from many European countries, and from the US, participated in Polish YMCA camps. A very important part of the programme was education, development of patriotism and participation of young people. Most of the programmes for youngsters were led by young leaders.

During World War II the Polish YMCA was closed by the Nazis, but the Polish movement continued to work in France, England, Romania and even in Africa with the Polish Army of General Władysław Anders. The Polish YMCA in London was founded, which still exists today.

Immediately after World War II the YMCA restarted its activity. But after four years, in 1949 the YMCA of Poland was once more closed, this time by the communists. All its possessions were taken over by the government.

The YMCA started its activity again in 1990, with the help of people who were members of the YMCA 40 years earlier. They revived the organisation and involved new members in its activities. It got back its houses in Gdynia, Łódź and Kraków and the camp "Pilica" near Łódź. Today the YMCA of Poland has 18 branches and continues to develop its programmes.
