= Szturmowcy =

Stormtroopers Szturmowcy
- Leader: Grzegorz Ćwik
- Founded: 2017
- Dissolved: 28 June 2019
- Newspaper: Szturm
- Ideology: "Nacjonalizm Szturmowy"; Polish nationalism Ethnonationalism; Third Position; National-Radicalism; Anti-liberalism; Anti-communism
- Colors: 1. 000000

Party flag

Website
- szturmowcy.org.pl szturmowcy.org

Stormtroopers (Polish: Szturmowcy) was a Polish neo-Nazi group led by Grzegorz Ćwik. The group was known for its role in forming the black bloc of the Independence March, mostly consisting of various nationalist groups, such as Niklot and the National Radical Camp. Szturmowcy had friendly relations with the Autonomiczni nacjonaliści.

== History ==
Szturmowcy operated and participated in the Independence March as part of the black bloc from 2017.

However, the organization, was shut down for a short period in 2017, before being reopened the following year.

Members of Szturmowcy distributed leaflets in 2018 at the University of Warsaw condemning 'Jewish Propaganda'.

The organizations first Facebook publications began in April 2018 and general website activity began in January 2018.

Szturmowcy participated in a nationalist march on 1 May 2018 to celebrate International Workers' Day, along with the Association for Tradition and Culture "Niklot" and «Autonomiczni nacjonaliści». Szturmowcy, along with the Autonomiczni nacjonaliści, actively participated in various nationalist conferences and marches throughout 2018, including the Independence March 2018.

Szturmowcy participated in events along with the Carpathian Sich — a Ukrainian neo-Nazi organization, and was accused of "allying with the banderites" for it.

On 28 June 2019, Ćwik announced on the official Facebook page of the organization that Szturmowcy would no longer operate as an organization, essentially ending the history of Szturmowcy. Ćwik and other members of Szturmowcy moved to the online-newspaper Szturm, where they still publish their monthly national-radical journals. The organization has stopped participating in the Independence March and other nationalist events since then.

On 13 November 2019 the Internal Security Agency (ISA) conducted a raid on the household of Ćwik, the leader of Szturmowcy, for 'propagating extremist ideology'. During the raid, the ISA confiscated;

- Hard drives
- Clothes
- Emblems
- Stickers
- Flags
- Books, that propagated extremist material, according to the ISA.

According to the ISA, Ćwik uploaded a document titled The Lone Wolf Guide to the internet, which, according to the ISA, propagated fascist ideology and contained calls to violence against minorities.

== Alliances ==
Throughout its history, Szturmowcy participated in events and was allied with other nationalist organizations, including;

- Carpathian Sich
- Association for Tradition and Culture «Niklot»
- Autonomiczni nacjonaliści
- The Black Bloc
- Scandinavian and German nationalist organizations
