= Polish nationalism =

Political ideology that promotes the interests of Polish nation

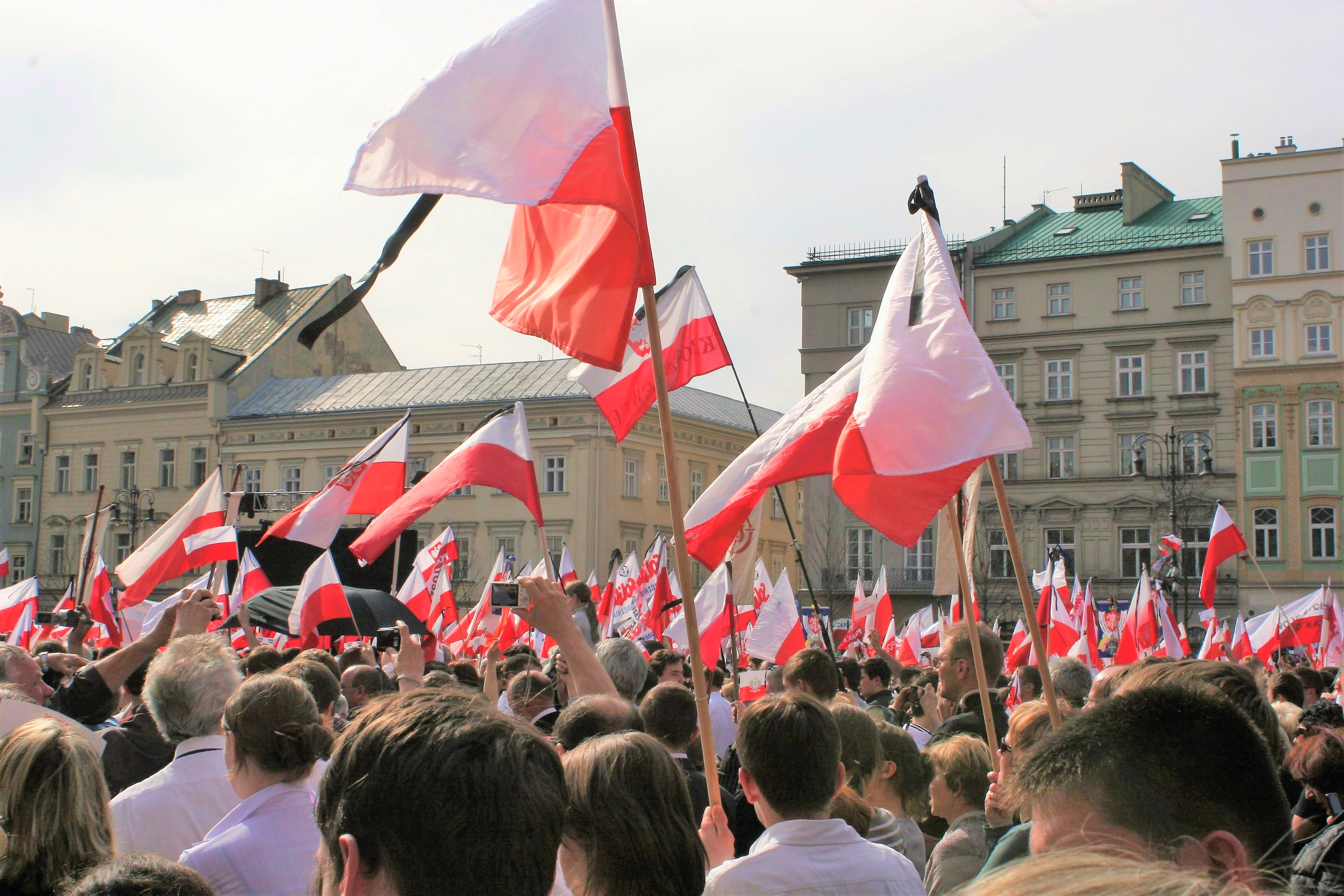
Flag of Poland displayed during the 2010 state funeral of Polish president Lech Kaczyński

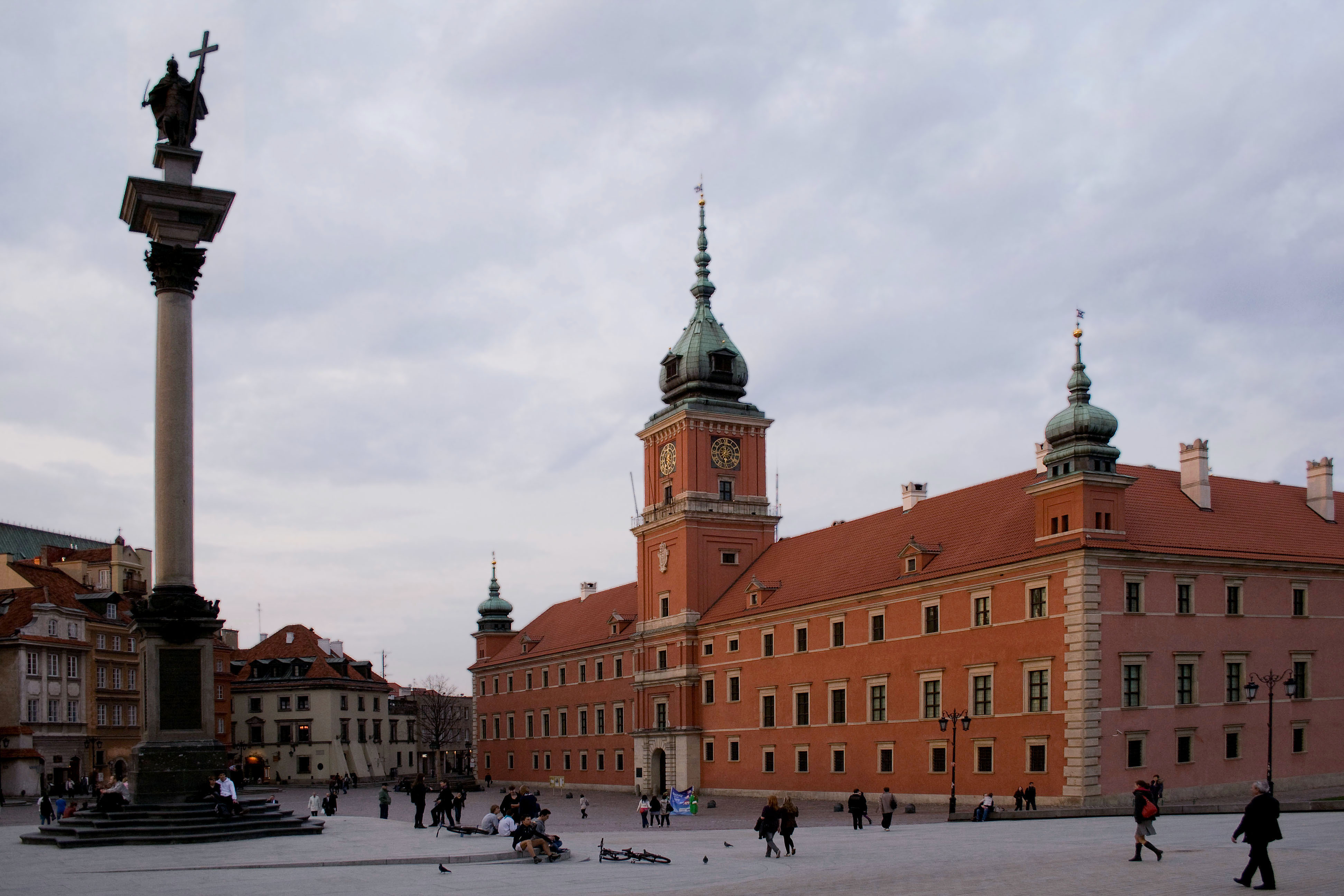
Warsaw's Castle Square, Royal Castle, and Sigismund's Column commemorating King Sigismund III Vasa of the Polish–Lithuanian Commonwealth who moved the capital to Warsaw in 1596

Polish nationalism (Polish: polski nacjonalizm) is a nationalism which asserts that the Polish people are a nation and which affirms the cultural unity of Poles. British historian of Poland Norman Davies defines nationalism as "a doctrine ... to create a nation by arousing people's awareness of their nationality, and to mobilize their feelings into a vehicle for political action."

The nationalism of the Polish–Lithuanian Commonwealth – a polity which existed de facto from 1386, and officially from 1569, until the Commonwealth's 1795 Third Partition – incorporating Poles, Lithuanians, East Slavs, and smaller minorities. was multi-ethnic and multi-confessional, though the Commonwealth's dominant social classes became extensively Polonized and Roman Catholicism was regarded as the dominant religion.

The nationalist ideology which arose soon after the Partitions was initially free of any kind of "ethnic nationalism". It was a Romantic movement which sought the restoration of a Polish sovereign state. Polish Romantic nationalism was described by Maurycy Mochnacki as "the essence of the nation", no longer defined by borders but by ideas, feelings, and thoughts stemming from the past.

The advent of modern Polish nationalism under foreign rule coincided with the November 1830 Uprising and the European Revolutions of 1848 ("the Springtime of Nations"). Their ensuing defeats broke the Polish revolutionary spirit. Many intellectuals turned to Herbert Spencer's social Darwinism and blamed Poland's erstwhile Romantic ("Messianist") philosophy for the insurrectionary disasters.

After the failure of the subsequent Polish January 1863 Uprising, the Romantic schools of thought were firmly displaced by a specifically Polish version of Auguste Comte's Positivist philosophy which dominated Polish thought to the end of the 19th century.

After the three partitioning empires collapsed in World War I, Poland returned as a territorially reduced and ethnically more homogeneous polity – though still with substantial minorities, especially the Ukrainians of southeastern Poland, which themselves began to harbor their own national aspirations.

== History ==
The earliest manifestations of Polish nationalism, and conscious discussions of what it means to be a citizen of the Polish nation, can be traced back to the 17th or 18th century, with some scholars going as far back as the 13th century, and others to the 16th century. Early Polish nationalism, or protonationalism, was related to the Polish-Lithuanian identity, represented primarily by the Polish nobility (szlachta), and by their cultural values (such as the Golden Freedoms and Sarmatism). It was founded on civic, republican ideas. This early form of Polish nationalism began to fray and transform with the destruction of the Polish state in the partitions of Poland from 1772 to 1795.

Modern Polish nationalism arose as a movement in the late-18th and early-19th centuries amongst Polish activists who promoted a Polish national consciousness while rejecting cultural assimilation into the dominant cultures of Austria, Prussia and Russia, the three empires which partitioned Poland-Lithuania and occupied the various regions of Poland. This was the consequence of Polish statelessness, because the Polish nationality was suppressed by the authorities of the countries which acquired the territory of the former Commonwealth. During that time Polishness begun to be identified with ethnicity, increasingly excluding groups such as the Polish Jews, who had previously been more likely to be accepted as Polish patriots. This was also the period in which Polish nationalism, which was previously common to both left-wing and right-wing political platforms, became more redefined as being limited to the right-wing, with the emergence of the politician Roman Dmowski (1864–1939), who renamed Liga Polska (the Polish League) as Liga Narodowa (the National League) in 1893.

Polish nationalism reached its height in the second half of the 19th century and in the first half of the 20th century. Crucial waves followed the Polish defeat in the January Uprising of 1864, the restoration of an independent Polish state in 1918 and the establishment of a homogeneous ethnic Polish state in 1945.

It has often been pointed out that the period of partition has a strong significance for Poles as a chapter in Polish history where the Polish nation survived and became socially and culturally stronger despite the loss of independence.

— Dr. Magdalena Kania-Lundholm, Re-Branding a Nation Online, Uppsala University, 2012

An important element of Polish nationalism has been its identification with the Roman Catholic religion, though this is a relatively recent development, with its roots in the Counter-Reformation of the 17th century, and one which became clearly established in the interwar period. Although the old Commonwealth was religiously diverse and highly tolerant, the Roman Catholic religious narrative with messianic undertones (the Christ of Nations) became one of the defining characteristics of the modern Polish identity. Roman Dmowski, a Polish politician of that era, was vital in defining that concept, and has been called the "father of Polish nationalism".

In 1922 G. K. Chesterton published the following opinion on Polish nationalism:

...

"I judged the Poles by their enemies. And I found it was an almost unfailing truth that their enemies were the enemies of magnanimity and manhood. If a man loved slavery, if he loved usury, if he loved terrorism and all the trampled mire of materialistic politics, I have always found that he added to these affections the passion of a hatred of Poland. She could be judged in the light of that hatred; and the judgment has proved to be right."

— G. K. Chesterton: Introduction to Charles Saroléa’s Letters on Polish affair, 1922

The post-World War II human migrations from 1945, with the resultant demographic and territorial changes of Poland that drastically reduced the number of ethnic minorities in Poland, also played a major role in the creation of the modern Polish state and nationality.

In communist Poland (1945-1989), the regime adopted, modified and used for its official ideology and propaganda some of the nationalist concepts developed by Dmowski. As Dmowski's National Democrats strongly believed in a "national" (ethnically homogeneous) state, even if this criterion necessitated a reduced territory, their territorial and ethnic ideas were accepted and practically implemented by the Polish communists, acting with Joseph Stalin's permission. Stalin himself in 1944-45 conferenced with and was influenced by a leading National Democrat Stanisław Grabski, coauthor of the planned border and population shifts and an embodiment of the nationalist-communist collusion.

Polish nationalism, together with pro-American liberalism, played an important part in the development of Solidarity movement in the 1980s. Polish irredentism keeps alive memories of Polish presence in the Kresy – the "Eastern Borderlands" formerly under Polish governance and now part of Lithuania, Belarus and Ukraine.

In current Polish politics, Polish nationalism is most openly represented by the right-wing – far-right nationalist Confederation and national-conservative PiS. In the 2023 elections, both gained 7% and 35% of the vote respectively. The most radical wing of Confederation, the far-right, nationalist, monarchist KKP, split from the main party, led by Grzegorz Braun.

== Parties ==
=== Current ===
- National Revival of Poland (1981–present)
- Self-Defence of the Republic of Poland (1992–present)
- National Radical Camp (1933–1934, 1935–1939, 1993–present)
- National Movement (2012–present)
- Confederation Liberty and Independence (2018–present)
- Confederation of the Polish Crown (2019-present)

=== Former ===
- National Democracy (1886–1947)
- National-Democratic Party (1897–1919)
- Popular National Union (1919–1928)
- Camp of Great Poland (1926–1933)
- National Party (1928–1947)
- Polish United Workers' Party (1948-1990)
- Confederation of Independent Poland (1979–2003)
- National Party (1989–2001)
- Christian National Union (1989–2010)
- Movement for Reconstruction of Poland (1995–2012)
- National-Catholic Movement (1997–2023)
- League of Polish Families (2001–present) (changed ideology in 2010)
- Polish National Party (2004–2014)
- National League (2007–2023)
- Party of Regions (2007–2017)
- Forward Poland (2008–2010)
- United Poland (2012–2024)

== Ideologies and movements ==
- Fourth Polish Republic
- Kaczyzm
- Polish Positivism
- Prometheism
- Young Poland

== See also ==
- Politics in Poland
  - Far-right politics in Poland
- Polonization
- Anti-Polish sentiment
- Polish national songs
- Polish irredentism
