= Tadeusz Bielecki =

Polish politician and writer

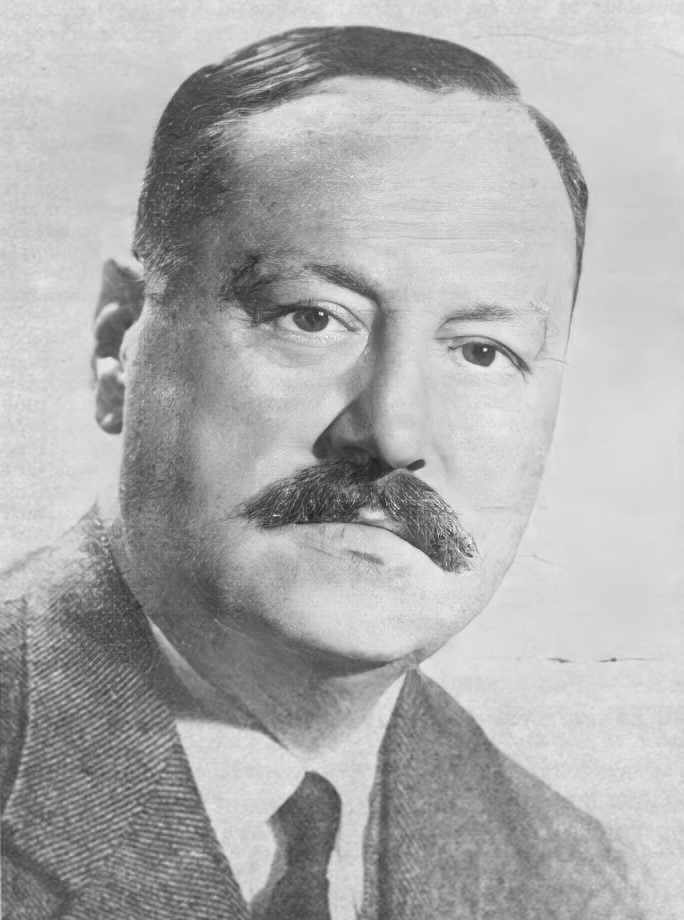

President of the National Party
- In office 1939–1982
- Preceded by: Kazimierz Kowalski

Member of the Sejm
- In office 1930–1935
- Preceded by: Kazimierz Brzeziński

Personal details
- Born: Tadeusz Pankracy Bielecki; 30 January 1901 Słupia, Poland
- Died: 5 February 1982 (aged 81) London, United Kingdom
- Resting place: Gunsbury Cemetery, London
- Party: National Party
- Other political affiliations: Camp of Great Poland
- Education: University of Warsaw
- Occupation: Politician; writer; ideologue

Tadeusz Pankracy Bielecki (born 30 January 1901 in Słupia – 5 February 1982 in London) was a Polish politician and writer. Personal secretary to Roman Dmowski, member of the National Party (Stronnictwo Narodowe) and Camp of Great Poland (Obóz Wielkiej Polski); he was however opposed to radicals from National Radical Camp (Obóz Narodowo-Radykalny). He fought in the Polish September Campaign, then escaped occupied Poland to join the National Council of Poland. He was a vocal opponent of Władysław Sikorski's policies in the Polish government in exile. After the war he remained in emigration, where he was a member of the Political Council and the Council of National Unity.

== Early life ==
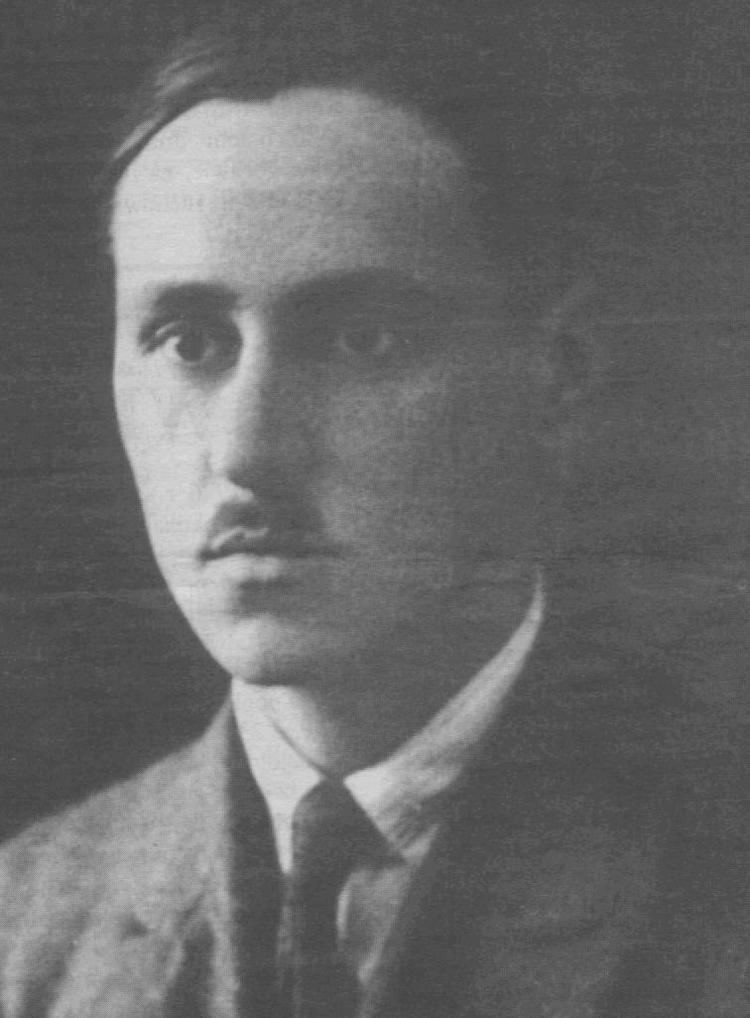
Tadeusz Bielecki in his youth

He came from a teaching family. He passed his matriculation exam at the Higher Real School in Będzin. From 1919 he studied at the Faculty of Philosophy of the Jagiellonian University (with a break for voluntary participation in the Polish-Soviet War), and from 1924 he studied simultaneously at the Faculty of Law and the School of Political Science. In 1923-26 he worked as a junior high school teacher in Cracow. During his studies he joined the All-Polish Youth, and from 1924 he was member of the secret National League; he was also an animator of the clandestine National Gymnasium Organization (NOG) and coordinator of the numerus clausus action at universities. In 1926, he moved to Warsaw. For a year (1926–27) he was a personal secretary of Roman Dmowski. His doctoral thesis Socio-political Views of P. Świtkowski, written under the supervision of I. Chrzanowski, he defended it in 1927, while he received his Master of Laws degree from the University of Warsaw in 1929.

== Leader of the National Party ==
Originator of the name and structure of the Camp of Great Poland (OWP), he took the position of deputy chairman of the Youth Movement of the OWP from the beginning. At the same time, from 1928 he served as head of the Executive Department of the National Party's Board of Directors, and in 1934 he organized and headed the Youth Section of the SN. He was credited with the dynamic development of the national movement in the 1930s, especially in the younger generation and in the rural areas. On his initiative and under his leadership, an All-Polish convention of SN rural activists was held (II 1937) in Warsaw. In 1930-35 he was a Sejm deputy from the Skierniewice-Rawa district, and from December 1938 until the outbreak of war he was leader of the National Club in the Warsaw City Council.

In 1935, he became vice-president of the SN; he was also appointed by Dmowski to all the informal leadership bodies of the national camp (“seven” and “nine”), but formally became president of the SN only in June 1939 after winning the battle with the faction of outgoing president Kazimierz Kowalski - Jędrzej Giertych, which brought together the most intransigent “anti-Sanationists”. Thus, he had to lead the party, although the longest (42 years) of all the leaders, but in the most difficult period and in part in only symbolic form, because in exile.

== Exile ==
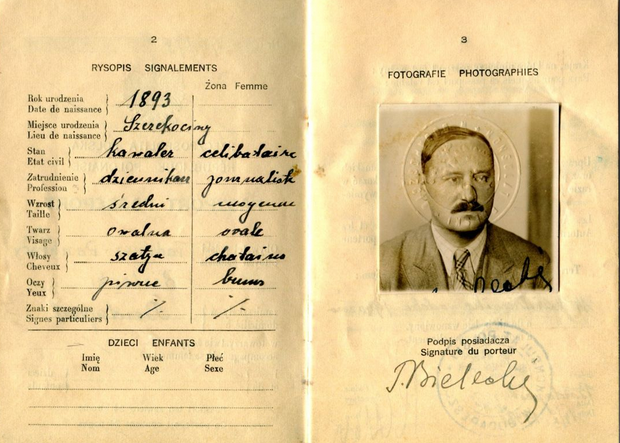
Tadeusz Bielecki's 1939-1942 passport, with Hungarian, Yugoslavian, Vichy, Spanish and Portuguese visas

After the September campaign, he made his way to France, where in I 1940 he became a member of the National Council - an exile substitute for parliament. Together with Piłsudskiites (Ignacy Matuszewski, August Zaleski) and monarchist Stanisław Mackiewicz (Cat), the National Party led by Bielecki was the core of the opposition against the provisions of the Sikorski-Mayski agreement of July 1941 on “amnesty” for Polish citizens and undermining the eastern border of the Republic, and from November 1944 - one of the pillars of the “anti-Yalta” government of Tomasz Arciszewski. At the same time, in December 1942, he put forward as the first Polish politician officially, on behalf of the SN, the demand to move the western border of the Republic on the Oder and Lusatian Neisse. After the war, he was a co-organizer of the Political Council (1949–54), and since the split in the “Polish London” he became chairman of the Council of National Unity (1954–72), bringing together most of the groups of the independence emigration. He patronized the resurgence of the national movement in the country from the early 1970s, providing its activists with access to the pages of “Polish Thought” and helping to organize underground printing; he gave special care and interest to the new national-Catholic formation, the Young Poland Movement.

== Death ==
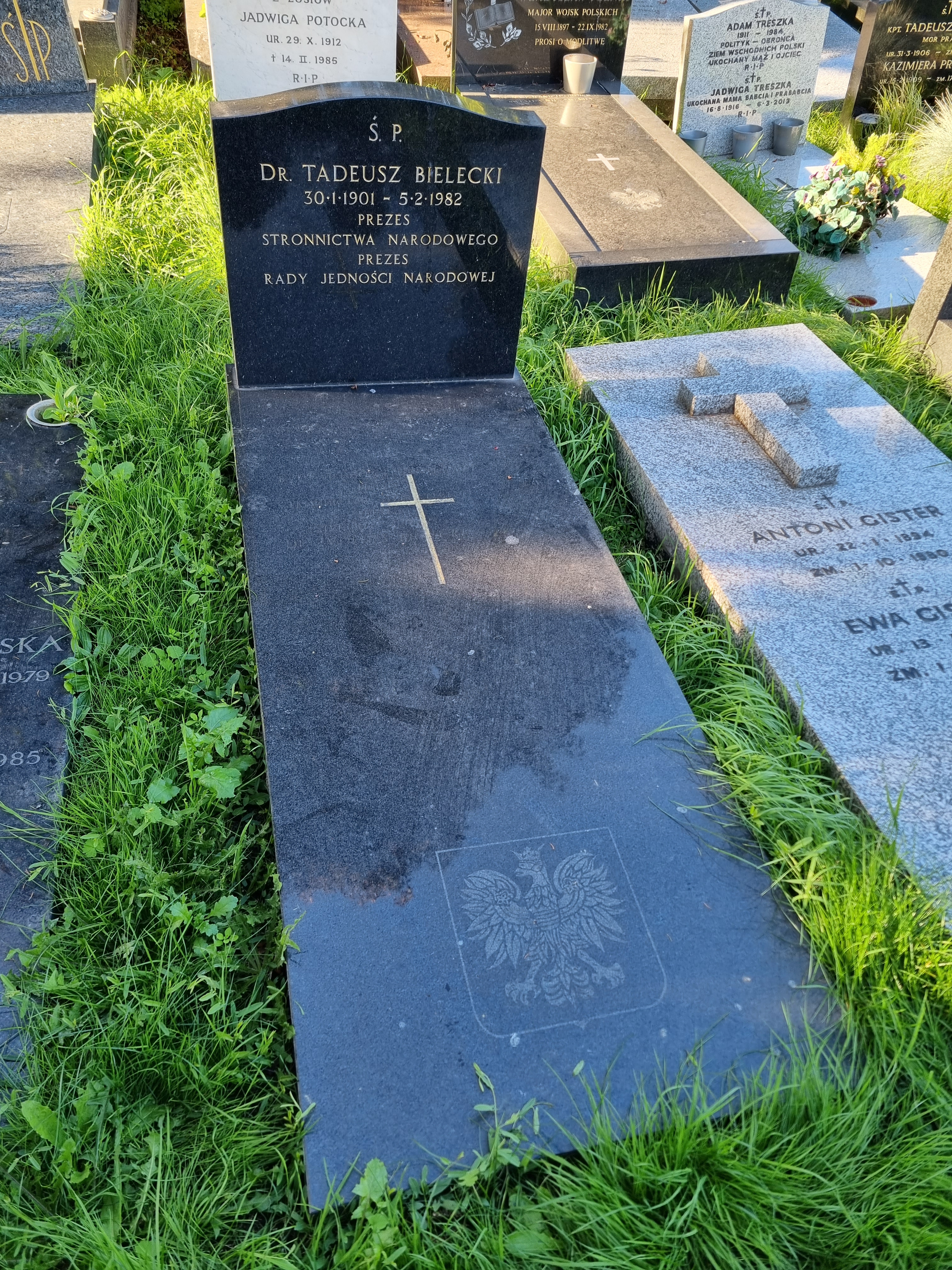
Tadeusz Bielecki's grave

In 1981, he was hospitalized for an extended period at London's Charing Cross Hospital, where he died at 0:50 a.m. on 5 February. A few days later, the Rev. Bishop Szczepan Wesoły celebrated a funeral mass at Brompton Oratory, which brought together 800 Polish expatriates and his immediate family. He was buried in Gunsbury Cemetery.

== Bielecki as an ideologue ==
Widely appreciated as an activist and organizer, Bielecki is less well known as an ideologue of the “young” National Democracy, i.e., the generation that had already begun its activities in independent Poland. He was ideologically shaped in particular by the prominent playwright K. H. Rostworowski, with whose “Tribune of the Nation” he constantly collaborated and to whom he dedicated a literary and ideological monograph Karol Hubert Rostworowski, In 1938. Like that entire generation of nationalists, Bielecki embodied a firm turn to Christian nationalism, ridding himself of the remnants of liberalism and positivist agnosticism. He considered Portuguese Salazarism and, after the war, Gaullism to be closest to his understanding of nationalism. He distinguished between two types of nationalism: 1/ “savage, pagan, revolutionary, integral, leftist, imperialist, materialist, biological, negative, anti-parliamentary and closed”, and 2/ “enlightened, Christian, evolutionary, republican, ‘bourgeois’, defensive, spiritualist, humanist, constructive, democratic, open”, identifying with the latter series of values and arguing that it marked Dmowski's national idea. Furthermore, he also emphasized the dynamic nature of nationalism, being “a thought that is constantly forming, constantly growing, constantly absorbing new elements into itself, constantly purging itself of the notions of the previous era when these turn out to be incompatible with reality or contrary to its essence.” He collected his most important ideological and historical texts in the book In Dmowski's school: sketches and memoirs (London 1968).
