= Adam Doboszyński =

Polish Army, writer, engineer, and social activist (1904–1949)

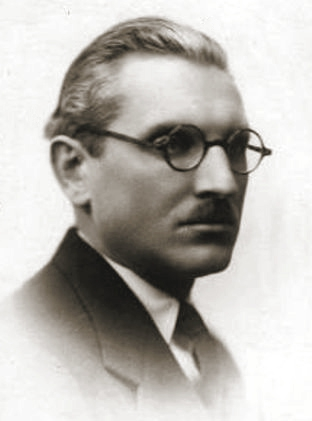

Personal details
- Born: Adam Władysław Doboszyński; 11 January 1904 Kraków, Grand Duchy of Krakow
- Died: 29 August 1949 (aged 45) Mokotów Prison, Warsaw, Polish People's Republic
- Party: National Party
- Other political affiliations: Camp of Great Poland
- Education: Gdańsk University of Technology
- Occupation: Politician; engineer; novelist; social activist; soldier
- Awards: Cross of the Valorous Croix de Guerre

Military service
- Allegiance: Poland
- Branch/service: Polish Army; Polish Army in France; Polish Armed Forces in the West
- Years of service: 1920, 1939–1940
- Rank: Lieutenant
- Unit: 1st Modlin Engineer battalion
- Battles/wars: Polish-Soviet War; World War II; September campaign; French campaign

Adam Doboszyński (11 January 1904 – 29 August 1949) was a soldier of the Polish Army, writer, engineer, and a social activist. Born in 1904 in Kraków, he was executed by the Communist secret services in 1949, in the notorious Mokotów Prison in Warsaw.

== Early life and education ==
Doboszyński was born in Kraków on 11 January 1904, in a noble family. His father Adam was a lawyer and a member of the Austrian Imperial Council. During the Polish-Soviet War, sixteen-year old Doboszyński volunteered to the 6th Regiment of Heavy Artillery in Kraków, serving for four months. After graduation from high school, Doboszyński went to study law at the University of Warsaw. He did not stay there long, moving to Free City of Danzig, to study at the Technische Hochschule der Freien Stadt Danzig (currently: Gdańsk University of Technology). He was an active member of Polish national organizations in Danzig in the 1920s. Among others, he was chairman of the Association of Gdańsk Academics Vistula and co-founded of the Brotherly Help of the Association of Polish Students. Doboszyński also participated in three Congresses of the International Conference of Students.

In 1925 he graduated from the Technische Hochschule with a diploma in construction engineering. In 1925 - 1927, Doboszyński continued his education at the Sciences Po in Paris, but was forced to quit his studies early due to his family's financial difficulties. After the return to Poland, he completed a course at the Officer Cadet Sapper School in Dęblin, after which Doboszyński was promoted to the rank of Second Lieutenant in reserve.

== Career ==
=== Early writings, activism ===
In the late 1920s, Doboszyński returned to his family estate, located in the village of Chorowice near Kraków, where he wrote his first books. In 1928, he wrote a novel Słowo ciężarne (Pregnant Word). Also, he wrote Szlakiem Malthusa (Following Thomas Robert Malthus), and an unpublished drama Trans (Trance). Furthermore, Doboszyński was active in the local Polish landed gentry circles, holding the post of a secretary in the Kraków Branch of the Association of Landowners (1929 - 1931).

In 1931, Doboszyński became a member of Camp of Great Poland and since then was associated with Polish right-wing, national movement. In 1933, during a trip to England, he met G. K. Chesterton, whose ideas greatly influenced the Polish activist. In 1934, he wrote a book Gospodarka narodowa (National Economy), which was enthusiastically welcomed by right-wing activists. The book was a great success, it was reprinted three times, fourth reprint was terminated by the outbreak of the war.

Doboszyński's view of Polish national economy was shaped by the works of Augustine of Hippo and Thomas Aquinas. His critique of liberal capitalism and collectivism was based on the teachings of the Roman Catholic church. Doboszyński argued that both capitalism and communism, seemingly so different from each other, were based on anti-Christian, materialistic outlook. He criticized liberal capitalism, regarding it as immoral. He expressed the opinion that both liberal capitalism and communism were joined by collectivism, and in his opinion, both doctrines had the same root, which was materialistic outlook. According to his philosophy, communist destroyed the human existence, exploiting an individual in the name of the creation of utopia. The process of mindless industrialization and centralization of economy was evil in his view, contributing to the moral decline of societies and exploitation of humans.

According to Doboszyński, the alternative to liberal capitalism in Poland was the creation of a national society, which was able to defend the nation from the concentration of industry. The society should be built like a human organism, in which an individual should not feel alienated, but be supported by the family and the homeland. The basis of a new economic regime was to be trade corporations of both employers and employees. Also, stratification of society was to remain untouched.

=== Political career ===
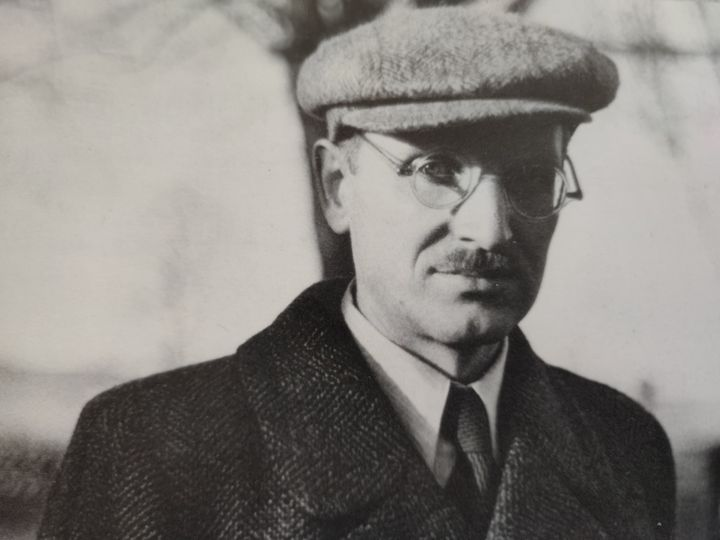
Photo of Doboszyński in the 1930s

In 1934, Doboszyński joined Kraków Branch of the National Party (Poland), in which he was responsible for propaganda. He was regarded as a skillful administration, who built party structures in the region. He traveled across Poland, giving speeches to the workers of industrial centers of Bielsko-Biała, Łódź, Częstochowa or Borysław. Furthermore, he created mobile libraries, which toured the country, presenting national camp publications to the readers. Doboszyński co-created "Polish Labor" trade unions, which remained under control of the National Party. He published a number of press articles, remaining in close contact with other activists of the party. Due to his activities, he was frequently harassed by the police, and was close to imprisonment at the infamous Bereza Kartuska prison.

=== Raid of Myślenice, imprisonment ===
On the night of 22–23 June 1936 Doboszyński carried out the so-called Raid of Myślenice. A group of national activists, commanded by him, seized control of the town of Myślenice, disarming a local police station and cutting telephone wires. Windows of several Jewish-owned businesses were broken, and goods from these stores were carried out to the main market square, where they were set on fire. The raid was a response to the killing of National Party politician Wawrzyniec Sielski, who had been shot by the police in February 1936. In the morning of June 23, Doboszyński's unit retreated from Myślenice. It was followed by the police forces, which twice clashed with the national activists, who were heading southwards, to the Czechoslovak border. Most activists were captured, two were killed in the clashes. Doboszyński himself decided to voluntarily surrender to the police on 30 June.

During the first interrogation, Doboszyński claimed that he was to be blamed for the raid. His trial began in Kraków on 14 June 1937, as one of the most famous political trials of the Second Polish Republic. Doboszyński claimed in court that he carried out the raid in protest of police terror of the Sanacja regime. He was acquitted by the jury, but the decision was protested by the Appellate Tribunal. In February 1938 in Lwów, Doboszyński was found guilty of only one charge: seizing weapons from police post. He was sentenced for three and half years, but was released in February 1939 due to deteriorating health. Doboszyński remained actively involved in politics in the last months of the Second Polish Republic. During the April 1939 Congress of the National Party, he supported Zygmunt Berezowski.

=== Second World War ===
In September 1939, Doboszyński joined Polish Army as a volunteer. Wounded near Lwów, he managed to escape from German captivity to Hungary and finally to France and Great Britain. For his military heroism, he was awarded the Cross of Valour (Poland) and the Croix de Guerre. In the early 1940s, while in Great Britain, Doboszyński remained in the service as a colonel. At the same time, he continued his political activity, publicly criticizing the National Party and its chairman Tadeusz Bielecki for its submission to the government in exile of General Władysław Sikorski. He actively worked on the creation of a wide national - Catholic bloc of several political movements. Doboszyński continued promoting Catholic-based ideas of a nation and social regime. In 1941 - 1941, together with Father Stanisław Bełch he published "I am a Pole" magazine, in which he criticized General Sikorski for his pro-Soviet stance. In his opinion, Sikorski was a weak man, whose career was based on his affiliations with French politicians.

In April 1941 Doboszyński was sent to a camp of Sikorski's opponents, located on the Isle of Bute in Scotland. He remained there until January 1942. After release, he continued his critique of Sikorski. In February 1943 he published an open letter, urging President Władysław Raczkiewicz and General Kazimierz Sosnkowski to overthrow Sikorski. The letter was supported by several Polish circles, but Doboszyński was arrested and then expelled from the army. Doboszyński strongly opposed all kinds of uprisings, regarding them as unnecessary and pernicious to the Polish nation. In November 1943 he published a text "The Economy of Blood", in which he argued that any uprising, breaking out in occupied Poland, would be as tragic as Polish 19th-century, failed insurrections. He also opposed the Third World War against the Soviet Union, arguing that it would not result in Poland's independence.

=== Post-war ===
Following the war, Doboszyński remained in London. He lived in poverty, with occasional help provided by his friends from former Polish Armed Forces. Despite these problems, he continued writing. In 1945, he wrote in English "Economics of charity", and two years later completed the "Pocket Encyclopedia of Social Notions", and "Two Platforms of Nationalism". He also translated into Polish G.K. Chesterton's "A Short History of England" and Christopher Hollins' "Breakdown of Money". Furthermore, he remained politically active, as a member of a group called the "Generation of Independent Poland", in which he promoted the creation of a federation of Central European states, as a counterbalance against the expansion of Russia and Germany. Doboszyński also supported the Anti-Bolshevik Bloc of Nations.

In December 1946 Doboszyński secretly returned to Poland. He wanted to personally become acquainted with political, economical and social situation of the country. Also, he wanted to meet with leaders of anticommunist guerilla movement, to tell them that they should not expect any support from the West. By early 1947, he was openly traveling across the country, meeting with national and Catholic activists. His plan was to create a strong national-Catholic organization, which would eventually create a stronger Poland. His activities were closely monitored by the Communist agents, as most of his partners were arrested.

=== Show trial and execution ===
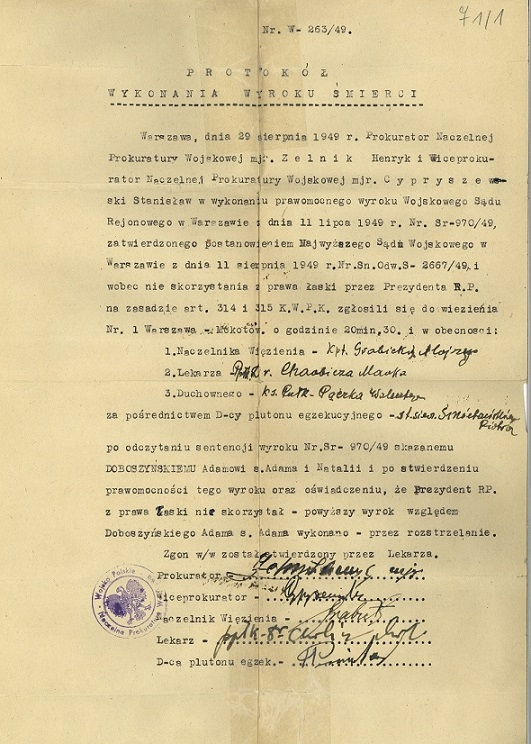
Protocol of the execution of Adam Doboszyński. Warsaw, 29 August 1949

December 1946 Doboszyński clandestinely returned to Poland. In early summer 1947, Doboszyński completed his last work, "Half Way", which contained his opinion on the situation of Poland, prognosis for the future and advice for the national movement. Doboszyński was arrested July 1947. His sister Jadwiga Malkiewicz was arrested in September 1947, being accused of helping him to contact the anti-Communist underground in Poland.

18 June 1949 til 11 July Doboszyński was trialed at the Warsaw Regional Military Court, standing accused of being an agent of the German, as well as an American intelligence service agent from 1933 to 1947.

== Political legacy ==
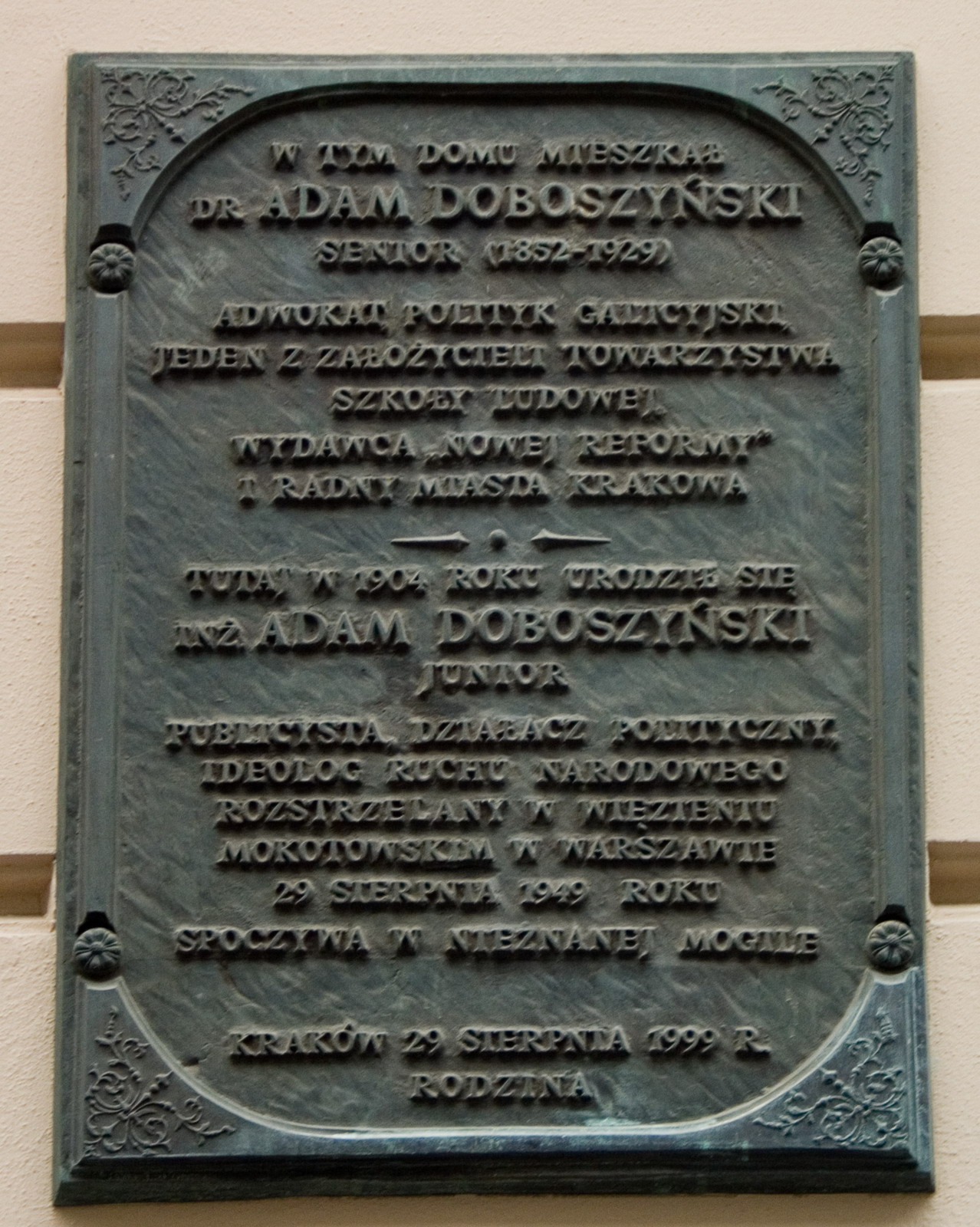
Adam Doboszyński commemorative plaque in Kraków

Doboszyński is now regarded as important thinker on agrarianism, which was an important source of influenced on collectivist economics in Poland. Doboszyński is counted among the most important agrarianist theorists in the interwar period, alongside Stanislaw Milkowski. Agrarianism was supported by economists such as Franciszek Bujak, Władysław Grabski, and Stanisław Głąbiński. Doboszyński's ideas were not utopian, he advanced the idea of a New Middle Age, and rejected the concept of modernity. He argued that it was easier for the nation state to reach an agreement with a handful of small independent craftsmen and producers; or, if that is not possible, economic mechanisms such as cooperatives and member-owned mutual organisations as well as small to medium enterprises and large-scale competition law reform such as antitrust regulations, instead of negotiating with large corporations (although he preferred corporatism over capitalism and socialism).

== See also ==
- Cursed soldiers
- 1951 Mokotow Prison execution
