= Giertych =

Giertych (Polish pronunciation: [ˈɡʲɛrtɨx]) may refer to:

- Jędrzej Giertych (1903–1992), Polish politician, journalist and writer
- Maciej Giertych (born 1936), Polish dendrologist, son of Jędrzej
- Wojciech Giertych (born 1951), Polish Theologian of Pontifical Household, son of Jędrzej
- Roman Giertych (born 1971), Polish politician, son of Maciej
