= Feliks Koneczny =

Founder of the original system of the comparative science of civilizations

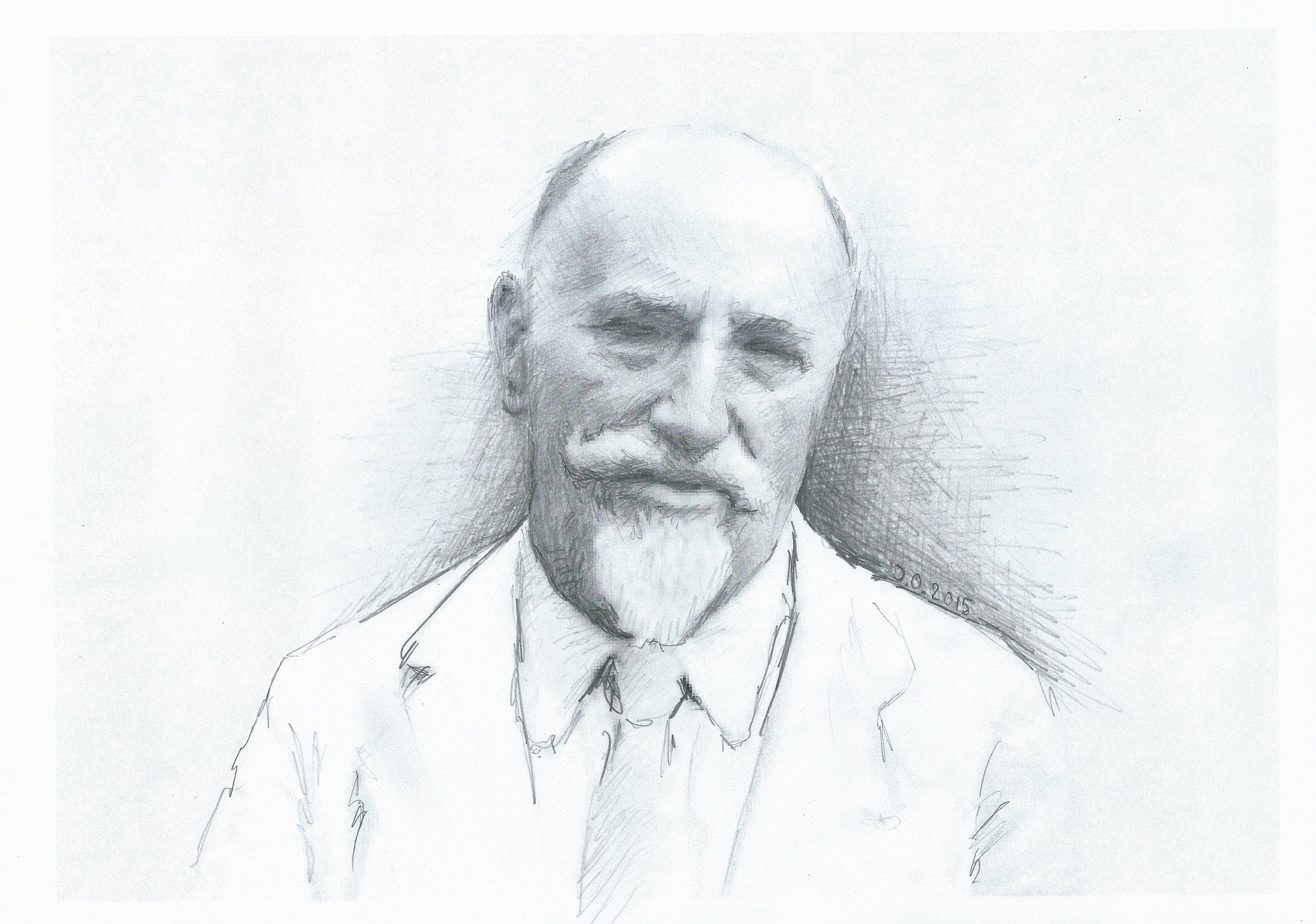
- Portrait of Feliks Koneczny (2015)
- Born: 1 November 1862; Kraków, Austro-Hungarian Empire
- Died: 10 February 1949 (aged 86); Kraków, Poland

Academic background
- Influences: Bacon; Montesquieu; Turgot; Kołłątaj; Guizot; Leo XIII; Buckle; Taine; Le Bon

Academic work
- Discipline: History
- School or tradition: Empiricism; National Democracy; Catholic social teaching Litvinism
- Main interests: Civilisation, History of Poland, Tradition
- Notable ideas: Science of Civilisation; Latin civilisation German Byzantinism; Quinqunx of existential values
- Influenced: Hilckman; J. Giertych; Huntington (disputed); M. Giertych; Kossecki; Braun; Sykulski; Skrzydlewski

Feliks Karol Koneczny (Polish pronunciation: [ˈfɛliks ˈkarɔl kɔˈnɛt͡ʂnɨ]; 1 November 1862 – 10 February 1949) was a Polish historian, theatrical critic, librarian, journalist and social philosopher. He founded the original system of the comparative science of civilizations.

== Biography ==
Koneczny was born in Kraków on 1 November 1862. His father was of Moravian origin. Koneczny's mother orphaned him at a young age while his father studied, although he had to work at a train station due to being expelled from the Jagiellonian University for partaking in the Kraków uprising.

Koneczny graduated from the Faculty of Philosophy at the Jagiellonian University in Kraków and began work at the Jagiellonian Library. After Poland regained its independence, he became an assistant professor in 1919. In June 1920, after he had qualified and received the degree of doctor habilitatus, he became a professor at Stefan Batory University in Wilno. After retiring in 1929, he moved back to Kraków.

== Writings ==
His interests ranged from purely historical research to the philosophy of history, religion and philosophy. His pioneering works deal with the history of Russia. Koneczny authored extensive monographs on Byzantine and Jewish civilizations, which he considered to be less developed than the Latin civilization of Catholic western Europe. In 1948, after sixty years of research work, Koneczny calculated that his written scholarly output encompassed 26 volumes, each of them being 300 to 400 pages long, not to mention more than 300 articles, brochures and reprints. His theory of civilizations might have inspired those of Anton Hilckman, Samuel P. Huntington and others.

== Theory of Civilizations ==
Koneczny’s theory on civilizations offered a diagnosis of a crisis of European culture and proposed a program of cultural revival. Koneczny developed a pluralistic theory that would serve as a structure for understanding human history as it is based on a presupposition that there exist many civilizations, which have complex forms of social organization. These civilizations are the primary structures of history. All other forms of social organization (e.g., cultures, nations, institutions, social movements) are derivative or secondary.

Koneczny divided civilizations into about twenty types, of which seven types still exist. Four are ancient: "Brahmin," "Jewish," "Chinese," and "Turanian". Three are medieval: "Latin," "Byzantine," and "Arab." The differences between civilizations are based on their attitude to law and ethics.

Koneczny did not tie civilizational type to any particular race or nation. Hence, Poles could represent the Turanian type of civilization (as, according to Koneczny, did Józef Piłsudski's Poland) and Germans could represent the Jewish type. In his publication Hitleryzm zażydzony ('The Judaized Hitlerism') Koneczny even claimed that Adolf Hitler was an example of the Jewish civilization type. On the other hand, an ethnic Jew could represent the Latin type of civilization.

== Bibliography ==
Most in Polish; seven books are available in English translation:

- Dzieje Rosyi. Tom I. (do roku 1449), Spółka Wydawnicza Warszawska, Warsaw 1917 (in Polish)
- Polskie Logos a Ethos, t. I–II, Księgarnia sw. Wojciecha, Poznań 1921.
- O wielości cywilizacyj, Gebethner & Wolff, Kraków 1935. English translation (abridged) On the Plurality of Civilisations, Polonica Publications, London 1962, Antyk, Komorów, 2012 .

English Translation: Web page, Word (1.2MB)

- Święci w dziejach narodu polskiego / Saints in the history of the Polish nation, t. 1–2, Tow. Sw. Michała Archanioła, Miejsce Piastowe 1937–1939.
- Rozwój moralności Tow. Wiedzy Chrześć., Lublin 1938. English translation "The Development of Morality", Antyk, Komorów, 2016.
- Cywilizacja bizantyjska, Towarzystwo im. Romana Dmowskiego, London 1973. English translation "The Byzantine Civilization", Antyk, Komorów, 2014.
- Cywilizacja żydowska, Towarzystwo im. Romana Dmowskiego, London 1974. English translation "The Jewish Civilization", Antyk, Komorów, 2012.
- O ład w historii, Towarzystwo im. Romana Dmowskiego, London 1977. English translation "On order in History" Antyk, Komorów, 2014.
- Państwo w cywilizacji łacińskiej. Zasady prawa w cywilizacji łacińskiej / State in Latin civilisation. Rules of law in Latin civilisation, Towarzystwo im. Romana Dmowskiego, London 1981 (in Polish). English translation "The Latin Civilization" Antyk, Komorów,2016.
- Prawa dziejowe (oraz dodatek) Bizantynizm niemiecki / History laws (and an addendum) German byzantinism, Towarzystwo im. Romana Dmowskiego, London 1982.English translation "The Laws of History" Antyk, Komorów, 2013.
- Dzieje Rosji / History of Russia. Tom III. Schyłek Iwana III / Downfall of Ivan III of Russia. 1492–1505, Towarzystwo im. Romana Dmowskiego, London 1984.
- Zionism and the Polish cause (in Polish)

== See also ==
- Stanisław Brzozowski
- Aleksandr Dugin
- Ibn Khaldun
- Oswald Spengler
- Jan Stachniuk
- Arnold J. Toynbee
