= Camp of Great Poland (association) =

- Obóz Wielkiej Polski
- Abbreviation: OWP
- Predecessor: Camp of Great Poland
- Formation: 2003 (foundation); 2012 (registration)
- Type: National democracy, Nationalism
- Headquarters: ul. Syreny 8, 01-132 Warsaw, Poland
- Subsidiaries: OWP Youth Movement
- Website: www.owp.pl

The Camp of Great Poland (Obóz Wielkiej Polski; OWP) is a Polish national-democratic and nationalist association with legal personality (2012). It was founded in 2003 by Marcin Markowski as an ordinary association in Wrocław. It “continues Roman Dmowski's policies", as stated on the camp website. The official press title is "The New Vanguard". The OWP also publishes "The National Chronicle". The OWP uses the Piast eagle as an emblem - a drawing of an eagle, holding the Piast Szczerbiec (coronation sword of Polish kings), girded up in white and red ribbon.

== History ==
The association was established on March 28, 2003, as a response of the National Party (Stronnictwo Narodowe; SN) Youth Section to the deletion of the party from the national registry. In 2012 the OWP was registered in the National Registrar of Companies and Legal Entities (Krajowy Rejestr Sądowy; KRS), gaining legal personality.

== Structure ==
The Camp of Great Poland has approximately 150 members currently operating in both Poland and abroad. The most active branches are in Warsaw, Wrocław, Rzeszów, Oslo and London. The camp's headquarters is located in Warsaw, along with the National Library and the information office of the Union of Polish Associations and Organizations of Latin America (USOPAL). Leaders of the organization include Dawid Berezicki and Maciej Wydrych. Other known personalities are the director Bohdan Poręba, publicist Robert Larkowski, Dr Jan Eugeniusz Malinowski and Dr Zbigniew Siut.

== Declaration of policy ==
The purpose of the association is to raise awareness of the banner of the interwar that the Camp of Great Poland established in Poznan on December 4, 1926. The current camp emphasizes the necessity of strengthening Poland's position on the Baltic coast, alludes to Neoslavism, advocates the system of economic freedom, fights what it believes is anti-Polish propaganda. It is also an opponent of the European Union and expresses skepticism about NATO.

== Activities ==
The OWP conducts direct action, such as a demonstration "against the defamation of the Polish Nation" at the Jewish Historical Institute in Warsaw (June 26, 2009) and humanitarian aid for Serbs in Kosovo (May 2011). From the beginning, it has supported the idea of the March for Independence. At the invitation of the OWP, delegations from Slovakia, Serbia and USOPAL attended the march as well. The OWP regularly takes part in actions focused on the support for the Serbian Kosovo. It fights against the glorification of genocide perpetrators, members of the Ukrainian Insurgent Army (Massacres of Poles in Volhynia and Eastern Galicia 1943–1945), organizing or co-organizing protests. On September 11, 2011, the OWP initiated a rally opposite the Presidential Palace in Warsaw and wrote a collective letter to the Law and Justice party (PiS) leader Jarosław Kaczyński. The letter, which remained unanswered, included questions on the Law and Justice policy regarding Poles living in former Poland's East Frontiers.

== International cooperation ==
The OWP has numerous and regular international contacts, especially with organizations of nationalist profile from Slavic countries: Slovak Revival Movement (Slovenské Hnutie Obrody), Serbian National Movement (Српски Народни Покрет 1389), National Council (Народный Собор) in Russia. The OWP activists took part in the Serbian Cerski March (2011). They often visit Slovakia for paramilitary training, mountain expeditions and Slavic gatherings. OWP also cooperates with the Union Polish Associations and Organisations in Latin America, which leader Jan Kobylanski is the honorary chairman of the OWP, and other smaller Polish organizations. For several years, the camp has been supporting John Kobylanski's slander lawsuits against officials like minister Radosław Sikorski. In April 2012, the OWP leaders attended the XVII USOPAL General Assembly in Santa Cruz, Tenerife.

== Journalistic writing ==
The OWP activists write for "Mysl Polska” weekly and "Nowy Ekran" portal.

== Leadership ==
- Jan Trochimiak (1993–2003)
- Marcin Markowski (2003–2012)
- Dawid Berezicki (2012–)

== See also ==
- Camp of Great Poland
- National Radical Camp (1993)
- Conservative-Monarchist Club
