= Roman Rybarski =

Polish economist and politician (1887–1942)

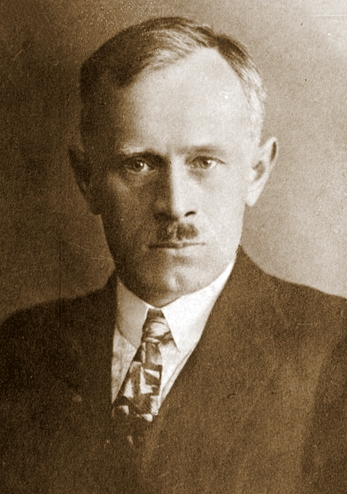
- Roman Rybarski

Member of the Sejm
- In office 1928–1935

Personal details
- Born: 3 July 1887 Zator, Kingdom of Galicia and Lodomeria, Austria-Hungary
- Died: 6 March 1942 (aged 54) Auschwitz-Birkenau, German-occupied Poland
- Party: National Party
- Education: Jagiellonian University
- Occupation: Economist

Academic background
- Influences: Smith · Jevons · Menger · Marshall · Sorel · Böhm-Bawerk · Popławski · Czerkawski · Durkheim · Mises · Schumpeter

Academic work
- Discipline: Political economy · Socioeconomics
- School or tradition: Kraków School; Austrian School; National liberalism
- Notable ideas: National Democracy

Roman Franciszek Rybarski (3 July 1887 – 6 March 1942) was a Polish economist and politician. He was the foremost economist of the right-wing National Democracy political camp and creator of its economic program.

Rybarski studied at the Law School of the Jagiellonian University in Kraków from 1906 to 1911. During the studies, he was a member of the secret Association of the Polish Youth "Zet". In 1910 he joined the National League, a secret Polish right-wing organization. Rybarski was professor at the Jagiellonian University from 1917 until 1920, from 1921 until 1923 at the Warsaw University of Technology and from 1924 at the Warsaw University.

In 1919 he took part in the Paris Peace Conference as an economic expert of the Polish delegation. Rybarski was one of the leading persons in the Camp of Great Poland. In 1928 he co-founded the National Party. From 1928 until 1935 he was a member of the Sejm, where he was one of the leading figures of the party. As one of the foremost persons in the "old faction" of the National Democracy, Rybarski advocated the parliamentary democracy.

In 1928, he authored a study in which he stressed the "harmful impact" of Jews on the economy and urban development. His 1931 newspaper article titled "Jewish Policy" marked the start of an Endek offensive against Jews. In the article Rybarski attacked the government, asserting that the Jews were responsible for the government's economic policy and by extension Polish suffering.

After the German invasion of Poland in 1939, Rybarski worked in the Polish underground, being in the Political Council of the Service for Poland's Victory. He held several other positions in the Polish underground state during World War II. On 17 May 1941 he was arrested by Nazi German authorities and incarcerated in the Pawiak prison. He was later transferred to the Nazi German Auschwitz concentration camp and eventually executed there for organizing the resistance movement in the camp.

In terms of economic thought, Rybarski was a fierce supporter of a laissez-faire to the economy. He advocated for stability of property rights and economic institutions, and low taxes. Compulsory social security, monopolies and government granted concessions to businesses were not desirable, according to his view. He was a supporter of the Austrian School of Economics. Austrian economists (Carl Menger, Eugen von Böhm-Bawerk, Ludwig von Mises, Joseph Schumpeter) had a great influence on his economic views.

== Works ==
- Idea gospodarstwa narodowego (1919)
- System ekonomii politycznej (t. 1–3 1924–39)
- Naród, jednostka, klasa (1926)
- Polityka i gospodarstwo (1927)
- Handel i polityka handlowa Polski w XVI stuleciu (t. 1–2 1928–29)
- Przyszłość gospodarcza świata (1932)
- Przyszłość gospodarcza Polski (1933)
- Podstawy narodowego programu gospodarczego (1934)
- Siła i prawo (1936)
- Skarbowość Polski w dobie rozbiorów (1937)
- Program gospodarczy (1937)
- Idee przewodnie gospodarstwa Polski (1939)
- Roman Rybarski : Gospodarstwo Księstwa Oświęcimskiego w XVI wieku.[w] Rozprawy Akademii Umiejętności. Wydział Historyczno-Filozoficzny. Serya II. 1932. Tom 43. Nr. 1-5
