= Karol Rzepecki =

Polish politician (1865–1931)

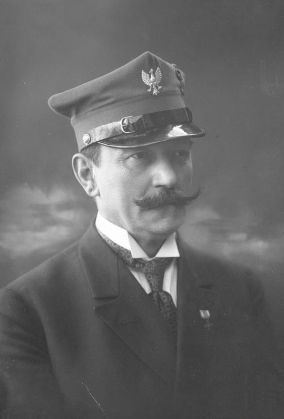
- Portrait of Rzepecki, c.1918. From the National Digital Archives
- Born: June 21, 1865; Posen, Grand Duchy of Posen, Kingdom of Prussia
- Died: December 14, 1931 (aged 66); Poznań, Poznań Voivodeship, Second Polish Republic
- Organizations: Rozwój; Sokół
- Political party: National Party
- Other political affiliations: Popular National Union

Karol Rzepecki (21 June 1865 in Poznań – 14 December 1931 in Poznań) was a Polish bookseller, social and political activist, editor of Sokół (Falcon) magazine of the Sokół movement.
