= National Democracy (Poland) =

Polish political movement

National Democracy Narodowa Demokracja
- Main theoretician: Roman Dmowski
- Ideology: Civic nationalism (Polish); National conservatism Antisemitism (Polish)

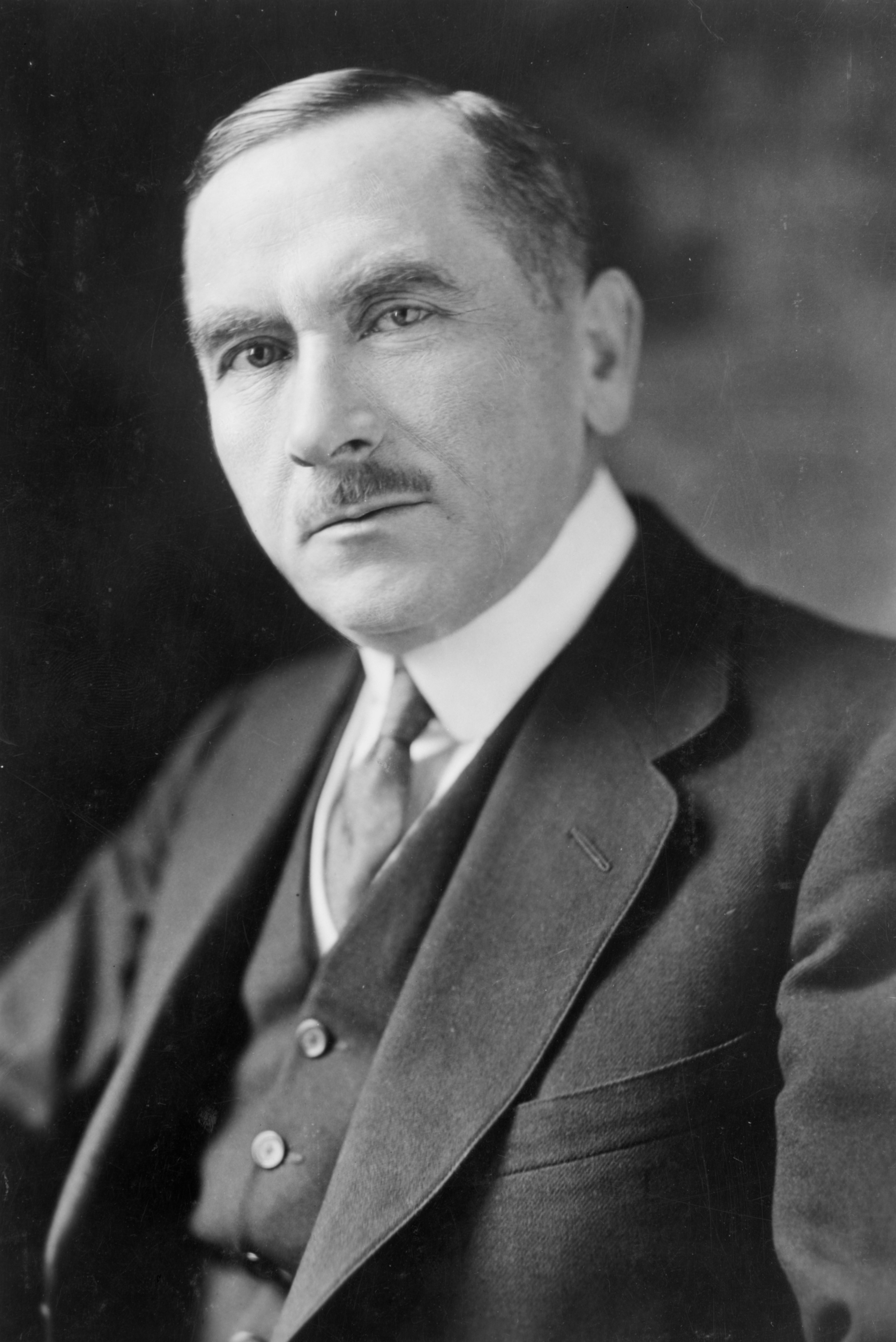
Roman Dmowski, considered the most important figure in the National Democratic movement

National Democracy (Polish: Narodowa Demokracja, often abbreviated as ND or known as Endecja; [ɛn̪ˈd̪ɛt̪͡s̪jä]) was a Polish political movement that operated from the second half of the 19th century, during the partitions of Poland, until the end of the Second Polish Republic. It effectively ceased to exist following the Germano–Soviet invasion of Poland in 1939.

Throughout its history, National Democracy underwent several phases of development. Initially founded to advocate for Poland's sovereignty against the foreign imperial powers, the movement adopted a right-wing nationalist orientation after the country regained independence. Its key founder and principal ideologue was Roman Dmowski, with other influential figures in the movement including Zygmunt Balicki and Jan Ludwik Popławski.

National Democracy found its main base of support in Greater Poland (western Poland), where early momentum was driven by opposition to Imperial Germany's Germanization policies in Polish territories. Over time, the movement's focus shifted toward addressing what it perceived as economic competition between Polish Catholics and the Jewish community. The party's supporters primarily consisted of the ethnically Polish intelligentsia, the urban lower-middle class, segments of the middle class, and a significant youth wing.

During the interbellum Second Republic, the ND was a strong proponent for the Polonization of the country's German minority and of other non-Polish (Belarusian, Jewish, Lithuanian and Ukrainian) populations in Poland's eastern border regions (the Kresy). With the end of World War II, the occupation of the country by the Soviet Union, and the establishment of the Polish People's Republic, the National Democracy movement effectively ceased to exist.

== Origins ==
The origins of the ND can be traced to the 1864 failure of the January 1863 Uprising and to the era of Positivism in Poland. After that Uprising – the last in a series of 19th-century Polish uprisings – had been bloodily crushed by Poland's partitioners, a new generation of Polish patriots and politicians concluded that Poland's independence would not be won through force on the battlefield, but through education and culture.

In 1886, the secret Polish League (Liga Polska) was founded. In 1893 it was renamed National League (Liga Narodowa). From 1895, the League published a newspaper, Przegląd Wszechpolski (The All-Polish Review); from 1897, it had an official political party, the National-Democratic Party (Stronnictwo Narodowo-Demokratyczne). Unlike the Polish Socialist Party (PPS), the ND advocated peaceful negotiations, not armed resistance. Influenced by Roman Dmowski's radical nationalist and social-Darwinist ideas, National Democrats soon turned against other nationalities within the Polish lands, most notably the Jews; antisemitism became an element of ND ideology.

During World War I, while the PPS under Józef Piłsudski aligned with the Central Powers against Russia (through the Polish Legions), the ND initially allied with the Russian Empire (supporting the creation of the Puławy Legion) and later with the Western Powers (supporting the Polish Blue Army in France). At the end of the war, many ND leaders held more influence abroad than in Poland, which allowed them to use their diplomatic leverage to share power with Piłsudski, who had broader military and domestic support. Due to their connections abroad, ND politicians such as Dmowski and Ignacy Paderewski were able to secure international backing for their positions at the Paris Peace Conference of 1919 and in the Treaty of Versailles.

== Second Republic ==
In the newly independent Second Polish Republic, the ND was initially represented by the Popular National Union (Związek Ludowo-Narodowy), a conservative political party that advocated its program through democratic and parliamentary means. After Piłsudski's May 1926 Coup d'État, the ND found itself in opposition to his Sanacja government. The increasing control exerted by the Sanacja regime over opposition parties and its shift toward more authoritarian policies contributed to the gradual radicalization of the ND movement. In December 1926, the Camp of Great Poland (Obóz Wielkiej Polski) was formed as an extra-parliamentary organization opposing the Sanacja government. The youth wing of the Camp of Great Poland gradually took control of the entire organization; by 1931, the camp became more radicalized and incorporated some militaristic elements.

In 1928, the National Party (Stronnictwo Narodowe) was founded as the successor to the Popular National Union. Initially, the new party followed the same political line as its predecessor. Following the official banning of the Camp of Great Poland, more radicalized youth joined the National Party. A generational divide between the older and younger factions of National Democrats came to a head at the 1935 party convention, where younger activists took leadership of the party. From 1936 to 1939, these personnel changes continued, and the younger generation became dominant in the party. The older generation, disagreeing with the new direction, either left active politics or exited the party. A key aspect of ND policies during this time was their focus on Polonization of minorities. ND figures like Dmowski and Stanisław Grabski played a role in opposing Piłsudski's proposed Międzymorze federation and the alliance with Ukrainian leader Symon Petlura, contributing to tensions with Poland’s ethnic minorities.

At the same time, the ND expressed an antisemitic stance, advocating for the exclusion of Jews from certain aspects of Polish social and economic life and encouraging emigration from Poland. Throughout the 1930s, antisemitic actions and incidents, including boycotts, demonstrations, and even attacks, were organized or inspired by National Democrats. The most prominent of these actions were carried out by a splinter group of radical young former NDs who later formed the fascist-influenced National Radical Camp (Obóz Narodowo-Radykalny).

== World War II ==
During World War II, the ND became part of a coalition which formed the Polish Government in Exile. It was closely linked with the National Armed Forces (Narodowe Siły Zbrojne), an underground organization that became part of the Polish resistance movement. ND armed organizations fought not only against Nazi Germany but also against the Soviet Union. Both occupying forces regarded members of the movement as their mortal enemy, and its leaders were hunted down and killed in mass executions, in concentration camps, and in the Katyń massacre. Among those killed are:

- Leopold Bieńkowski (father of Zygmunt Witymir Bieńkowski), arrested by the NKVD in early 1940, died in a Soviet concentration camp near Arkhangelsk in 1941
- reverend Feliks Bolt, a senator of the Republic of Poland, died in Stutthof in 1940
- Tadeusz Fabiani, a lawyer, shot at Pawiak in 1940
- Stanisław Głąbiński, died in NKVD prison in Lubyanka in 1940
- doctor Wincenty Harembski, shot in NKVD prison in Kharkiv in 1940
- Tadeusz Zygmunt Hernes, journalist, killed in Katyń massacre
- Czesław Jóźwiak, murdered by the Gestapo in 1940 in Dresden prison
- Jan Mosdorf, Auschwitz
- reverend Marceli Nowakowski, shot in Warsaw in December 1939
- Stanisław Piasecki, writer, shot in Palmiry in June 1941
- reverend Józef Prądzyński, died in the Dachau concentration camp in 1942
- Jozefat Sikorski, murdered by the Gestapo in the Berlin-Plotzensee prison in 1942
- Michał Starczewski, murdered in the Katyn massacre
- Tadeusz Szefer, murdered in the Katyn massacre
- Jan Szturmowski, murdered by the Germans in September 1939
- Jan Waliński, murdered by the NKVD in Kharkiv in 1940
- Antoni Wolniewicz, murdered by the Gestapo in the Berlin-Plotzensee prison in 1942
- Jan Wujastyk, murdered in the Katyń massacre

=== Righteous among the Nations ===
- Edward Kemnitz
- Marceli Godlewski

== After the war ==
After the war, when a pro-Soviet communist government came to power in Poland, most remaining NDs either emigrated to the West or continued to oppose the Communist regime. Some, however, chose to collaborate with the new regime, most notably Bolesław Piasecki, leader of the RNR-Falanga, who co-organized a Catholic movement. These ex-Endeks within the ruling Communist Party aided the formation of a unique Party faction by 1956, the so-called "Endokomuna." This faction blended hardline Stalinism with Polish nationalism and Catholic communism, using similar rhetoric to National Democracy. Endokomuna attempted to use the traditional Russophilia and anti-Western sentiment of National Democracy to grow support for the Communist regime. Its activists were involved in "anti-Zionist" anti-Semitic agitation against the country's remaining Jewish minority during the 1968 Polish political crisis.

By the 1980s, "Endo-Communism" had become a dominant ideology of the ruling coalition, which was reformed into the Patriotic Movement for National Rebirth (PRON). Chaired by Endecja activist Jan Dobraczyński, this coalition aimed to counter the influence of anti-Communist opposition movements, primarily Solidarity, using nationalist rhetoric. As such, PRON commonly used slogans and themes from National Democracy, with activists such as Maciej Giertych serving on its Advisory Council.

== Contemporary Poland ==
Since the fall of communism, with Poland once again a democratically governed country, several political groups have sought to revive some of the traditions of National Democracy, with their supporters often referring to themselves as the "National Movement" (Ruch Narodowy). The only significant party that has declared itself a successor to the ND is the League of Polish Families (Liga Polskich Rodzin), founded in 2001 by Roman Giertych, grandson of Jędrzej Giertych, a pre-war ND politician. The party received 8% of the parliamentary vote in 2001 and 16% in 2004, but fell below the 5% threshold in 2007 and lost all of its parliamentary seats.

Another Polish national-democratic association with legal standing is the Camp of Great Poland. This association was established on March 28, 2003, by the National Party (Stronnictwo Narodowe; SN) Youth Section in response to the removal of the party from the national registry. On February 17, 2012, the OWP was registered in the National Registrar of Companies and Legal Entities (Krajowy Rejestr Sądowy; KRS), gaining legal personality.

Today, the main party promoting National Democracy is the National Movement. The party was originally formed as a nationalist coalition by Robert Winnicki, Krzysztof Bosak, and other former members of the LPR. As of 2025, the National Movement has 7 deputies in the Sejm, as part of a broader right-wing Confederation coalition.
The newspaper Nasz Dziennik is often associated with viewpoints that align with national-democratic ideas.

== Organizations ==
Mieczyk Chrobrego, a symbol of National Democracy in the latter half of the Second Polish Republic

- National League
- Polish Party (German partition)
- National-Democratic Party (Russian partition)
- Popular National Union
- Society for the Promotion of Polish Industry and Trade "Rozwój"
- National Party
- Camp of Great Poland

=== Modern ===
- National Party
- National Party "Fatherland"
- League of Polish Families
- National Movement
- Organisation of the Polish Nation - Polish League

== Notables ==
- Zygmunt Balicki
- Ignacy Chrzanowski
- Roman Dmowski
- Adam Doboszyński
- Jędrzej Giertych
- Stanisław Grabski
- Władysław Grabski
- Józef Haller
- Feliks Koneczny
- Władysław Konopczyński
- Wojciech Korfanty
- Stanisław Kozicki
- Leon Mirecki
- Jan Mosdorf
- Jan Ludwik Popławski
- Roman Rybarski
- Marian Seyda
- Józef Świeżyński
- Zygmunt Wasilewski
- Maurycy Zamoyski

== See also ==
- Camp of Great Poland
- Camp of Great Poland (association)
- National Radical Camp (1934)
- Conservative-Monarchist Club
