= National Party (Poland) =

National Party Stronnictwo Narodowe
- Abbreviation: SN
- Leader: Roman Dmowski; Tadeusz Bielecki
- President: Joachim Bartoszewicz; Kazimierz Kowalski; Tadeusz Bielecki
- Founded: 7 October 1928; 97 years ago
- Dissolved: 1947; 79 years ago
- Preceded by: Popular National Union
- Headquarters: Warsaw, Poland
- Newspaper: Gazeta Warszawska; Warszawski Dziennik Narodowy; Myśl Narodowa
- Student wing: All-Polish Youth
- Youth wing: Youth Section of the National Party (SM SN)
- Women's wing: National Women's Organization (NOK)
- Membership: 200,000 (1938 est.)
- Ideology: National Democracy: Polish nationalism; Conservatism (Note: -Ethnic nationalism -National conservatism -Authoritarian conservatism -Traditionalist conservatism -Conservative corporatism); Christian nationalism (Note: -National Catholicism); Parliamentarism; Anti-communism; Antisemitism (Note: -Economic antisemitism); Catholic social teaching; Distributism; Anti-Masonry
- Political position: Right-wing
- Religion: Roman Catholicism
- Colors: White Red Green
- Slogan: Czołem Wielkiej Polsce ("Hail Great Poland")
- Anthem: "Hymn Młodych" ("Youth Anthem")

Election symbol
- Szczerbiec

The National Party (Polish: Stronnictwo Narodowe, or SN) was a Polish nationalist political party formed on 7 October 1928 after the transformation of the Popular National Union.

The National Party gathered together most of the political forces of Poland's National Democracy right wing. Shortly before World War II the National Party, 200,000 strong, was the largest opposition party.

In the 1930s two main factions competed within the National Party, the "old generation" and the "young generation", divided by age and political programs. The old generation supported parliamentary political competition, while the activist young generation advocated extra-parliamentary political struggle. In 1935 the young activists took over the party's leadership. In 1934 a substantial part of the young faction split off from the National Party, forming a National-Radical Camp. During World War II, many National Party activists joined the National Armed Forces and National Military Organization resistance organizations.

== Name ==
Roman Dmowski admitted that many people preferred the party to be called in the old name - the National-Democratic Party. He chose the shorter name for the following reasons:

- to emphasize that a new era had begun in connection with the rebuilding of Poland
- in his conviction that the democratization of Poles had already taken place, and the time had come to transform them into a nationally aware political community
- to emphasize that the National Camp pursues politics in the name of the entire nation (without division into states or classes)
- in his conviction that the determinant of proper politics is to "sincerely and honestly place the good of the nation above all interests and ambitions."

== History ==
=== Genesis of the National Party ===
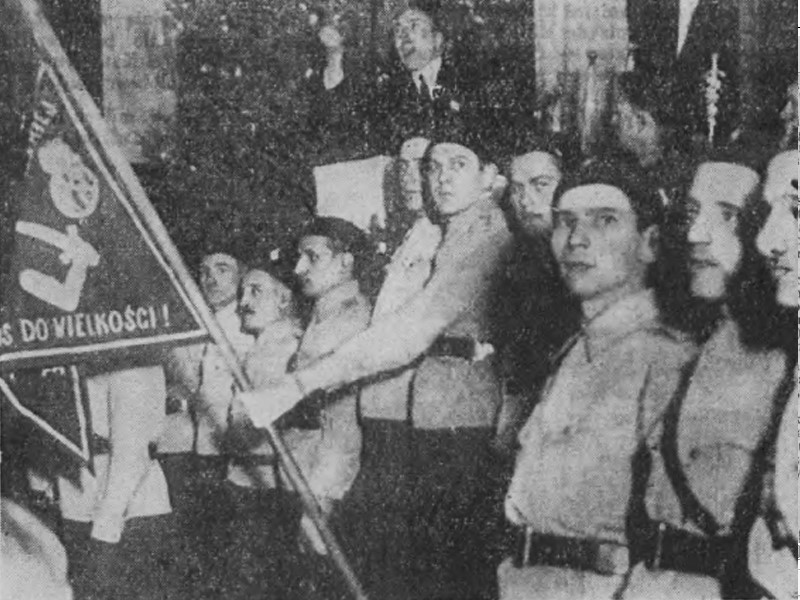
Meeting of the party in Poznań

The establishment of the Sanation dictatorship forced the National Democrats to thoroughly revise their previous political tactics. On 4 December 1926, at a convention in Poznań, Dmowski, who had previously kept to the sidelines of political life, focusing mainly on writing, announced the formation of the Camp of Great Poland (OWP). It was to be a supra-party social movement for the self-organization of as many Poles as possible, and at the same time for the formation of the younger generation as the future state elite. Hence, the decision to establish an autonomous Youth Movement within the OWP, headed by Jędrzej Giertych, Tadeusz Bielecki, Jan Mosdorf, and Zdzisław Stahl, among others. Current politics continued to be handled by the ZLN, but after losing the elections to the Sejm in 1928 (manipulated by Sanation), it was replaced by Dmowski with a new structure, the National Party, whose primary task was political work in parliament and in local governments. In place of the National League, critical of Stanisław Grabski, who had headed it until recently, Dmowski established a two-tier secret internal organization, known as the "Guard," which was to watch over the National Camp and at the same time ensure continuity of work in the event of arrests or delegalization. The "Guard" included politicians who would play important roles during the war, including Roman Rybarski, Władysław Folkierski, Stefan Sacha, and Mieczysław Trajdos.

=== Handover of the OWP to the young generation ===
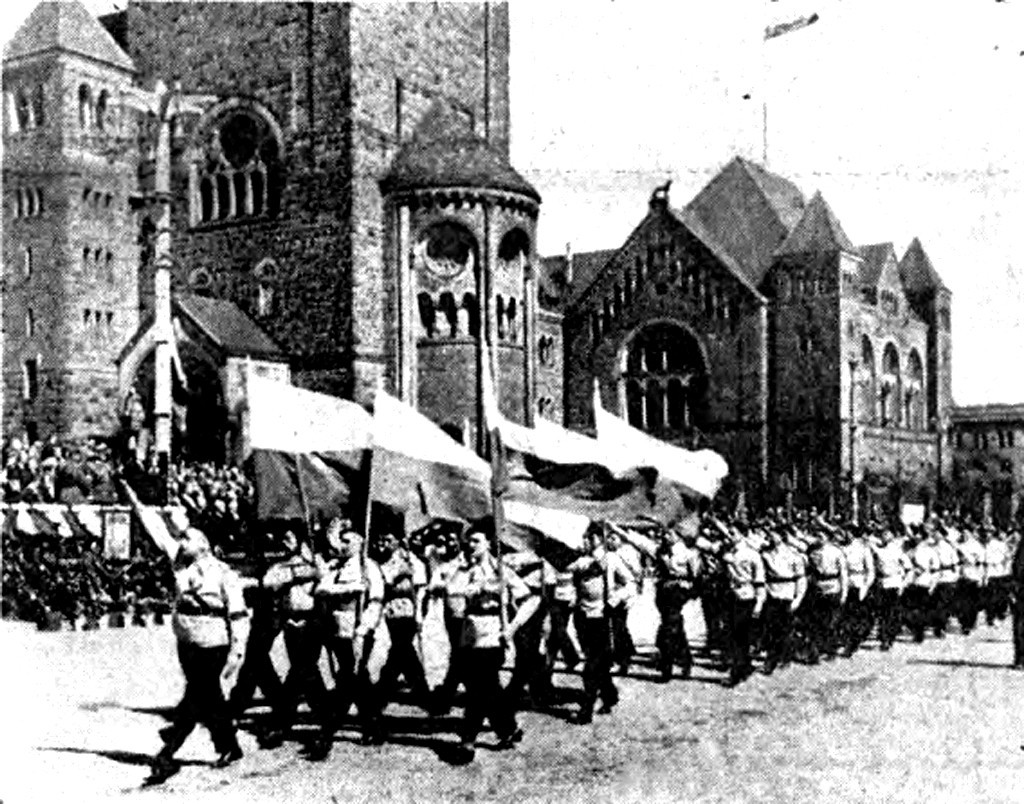
Members of Stronnictwo Narodowe during the 3rd May Day celebration in Poznań

The influx of youth into the OWP turned out to be so great that in 1931 Dmowski decided to make another move - to hand over the OWP to the young, probably with the intention of handing over the entire National Camp, as it was then accepted to call National Democracy, to activists born between 1900-1908. In doing so, he followed the principle of "striving forward," which he articulated at the All-Polish Youth congress back in April 1923: "nothing of what the camp has created - except, of course, the basic principles of ideology - is a dead formula to be learned and not to think further." He admitted that he himself had already departed "from many of the things" he had written about earlier, and called for "the constant effort to think."

By 1933, the OWP had more than 200,000 members, and was directly influencing another 100,000 people. A simple demographic calculation suggested that in time, the Sanation would be atrophied and replaced by a young generation shaped by the OWP. Unwilling to allow this to happen, and finding both attempts to scout Dmowski and administrative harassment ineffective, the regime announced the dissolution of the OWP on March 28, 1933, under the false pretext of threatening a coup d'état. More than a dozen activists were arrested, including Jędrzej Giertych. Presumably to intimidate Dmowski, on May 14 his secretary, 29-year-old Jan Chudzik, who at the time also headed the Young Section of the SN, was assassinated. Fearing another civil war after 1926, Dmowski recommended refraining from retaliation and moving from the disbanded OWP to the still-legal SN. Political violence, however, was on the rise.

The youthful nature of the OWP also had side effects. Young people, severely affected by the Great Depression, sought radical remedies, inspired by corporatism, the American New Deal program (implemented since 1933) and especially Italian fascism, which was attracted by the idea of solidarity, social policies, the development of the automobile and aviation, modernist construction, modern art, the violation of the liberal paradigm and socialism, despite the fact that it originated from socialism. The 27-year-old Stefan Niebudek, a member of the Main Board of the SN, succumbing to youthful idealism, wanted to see in Benito Mussolini a resurrector of the ancient Roman tradition, a unifier of the Italian nation, and at the same time a defender of the Catholic faith. His reportage titled In the Country of Black Shirts, written under the influence of a ten-day trip to Italy at Easter 1937, was perhaps the most far-reaching apologia for Mussolini's state in this political formation, with the author paying more attention to Catholic cultural monuments and relics of antiquity than to the infrastructural achievements of the regime. Under the influence of fascism, there was a fashion for uniforms, greeting each other with the Roman salute, and parades through the streets of cities. This was also the influence of the experience of World War I, as well as the egalitarization of societies in its aftermath, resulting in the postulate that everyone, regardless of background and wealth, should look alike or even the same. Dmowski found this fashion funny. He gave way to the young, but did not put on the uniform himself.

=== Generational conflict ===
Another effect of the youth character of the OWP was the growing generational conflict in the national movement, most fully described in Wojciech J. Muszyński's book "The Spirit of Youth. The Polish Organization and the National-Radical Camp in the Years 1934-1944. From Student Revolt to Independence Conspiracy." The mass transition of young people from the disbanded OWP to the SN soon led to tensions between the "old" and the "young," with a dilemma emerging among the latter whether to stick with Dmowski's conservative political methods or to follow the path of "national revolution," also seeking answers to the question of how Catholic Poland was to survive between the socialist Soviet Union and national-socialist Germany. Added to this was the fundamental question for the Second Republic, how the postulated nation-state should function, since Poles made up less than 70% of the population there, while the rest were minorities, the most numerous of whom were Ukrainians and Jews.

=== The period of splits: 1933-1934 ===
==== Union of Young Nationalists (ZMN) ====
In 1933-1934, there were splits in the SN. First, a small group of young activists from Poznań and Lwów, centered around Zdzisław Stahl, left and formed the pro-state Union of Young Nationalists (ZMN) (mainly in Poznań and Lwów), with the participation of, among others, Zygmunt Wojciechowski.

==== National-Radical Camp (ONR) ====
On April 14, 1934, a group of Warsaw academic youth, led by Jerzy Czerwiński, Władysław Dowbor, Tadeusz Gluziński, Jan Jodzewicz, Jan Korlec, Jan Mosdorf, Mieczysław Prószyński, Henryk Rossman, Tadeusz Todtleben, Wojciech Zaleski, announced - in the cafeteria of the Warsaw University of Technology - the formation of the National-Radical Camp (ONR). Its ideological declaration, drafted mainly by Mosdorf, was published the next day in the weekly magazine "Sztafeta". While outside Warsaw the vast majority of the youth opted to remain in the SN, in Warsaw 90% of the SN Youth Section - a total of about 2,000 people - joined the ONR. Dmowski's tactic of gradual generational change, despite attempts at mediation, ended in failure. He accepted it with bitterness, accusing the founders of ONR of the mindset and character of eternal students, especially since he did not, after all, abandon his intention to hand over the helm to the younger generation, which soon came to pass, when Tadeusz Bielecki, Jędrzej Giertych, Kazimierz Kowalski began to take power in the SN.

The ONR-ists officially showed Dmowski respect, while privately they referred to him with irony, as an infirm politician who did not understand the new times. In a letter to Father Józef Prądzyński, Dmowski wrote that he preferred not to announce in the newspapers that he severely condemned the fronda, so as not to put weapons in the hands of opponents. At the same time, he stressed: "I condemn it, not only because it breaks up the unity of the national camp, but that it is in itself stupid and harmful to our cause."

The leaders of the ONR were imprisoned in the Bereza Kartuska camp after just two months, and on July 10, 1934, the regime declared it banned, and led to the closure of "Sztafeta". To demonstrate the power of the authorities also detained approx. 100 SN members throughout Poland. This further radicalized the younger generation.

=== Generational shift: 1937-1939 ===
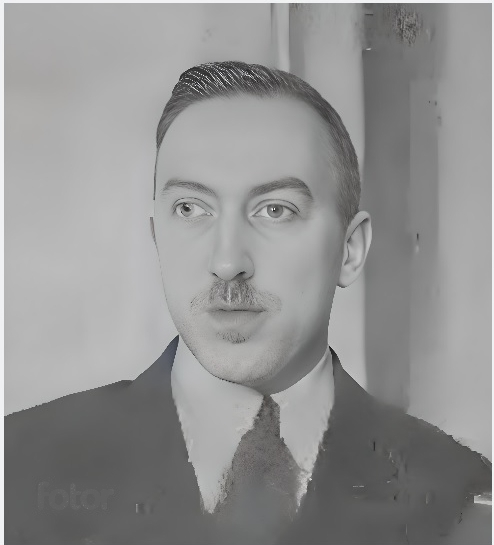
Kazimierz Kowalski - president of SN 1937-1939

With Dmowski's backing, in October 1937 the 36-year-old Kazimierz Kowalski became head of the SN's General Board. This marked a generational change. Until June, the ZG was headed by 70-year-old Joachim Bartoszewicz, Dmowski's associate in the Polish National Committee, a senator, and author of many program studies, such as Polish policy issues (1929). Between June and October 1937, Tadeusz Bielecki, a peer of Kowalski's and at the same time his rival, temporarily served as chairman. Kowalski had previously headed the Łódz District Board of the SN, and had appeared as an attorney in many political trials. He was said to have won Łódz for Dmowski in 1934. Poles made up only 58% of the city's population, which meant that the vast majority of them voted for either the SN or the Christian Democrats, then allied with it. Kowalski was supposed to become the city's deputy mayor, but this was prevented by Sanation, which established a board of trustees, and Kowalski was jailed for seven months on the pretext of disrupting the May 3 holiday. Soon the city council was also dissolved. As Giertych wrote, nevertheless, efforts were made to initiate a policy whose determinants were the Polonization of offices, commerce, intermediation (concessions), and thus the reduction of the role of Jews (who constituted 35% of Łódz's population), as well as the abandonment of statism resulting in the waste of money, the reduction of taxes and far-reaching savings, and the promotion of small property at the expense of large ones. Presumably, this course the SN would try to continue in a situation of coming to power at the central level.

In addition to Kowalski, the ZG SN consisted of Tadeusz Bielecki (vice-president), Mieczysław Trajdos (vice-president), Wladyslaw Jaworski (secretary), Witold T. Staniszkis (treasurer) and Jędrzej Giertych, Jan Matłachowski, Stefan Niebudek, Karol Wierczak. It was not a homogeneous group, although "young" predominated. A division soon emerged between supporters of Kowalski or Bielecki. The latter was aided by the fact that the opinion-making "Warszawski Dziennik Narodowy" was headed by Stefan Sacha, who was close to him. These factions differed in their approach to the Sanation regime and foreign policy. Also weighing on their relations was that Kowalski, as a politician from the social lowlands, despite his talent appreciated by Dmowski himself, could not find a common language with the Warsaw or Cracow intelligentsia, who rather saw a leader in the thoroughly educated (doctorate in Polish studies, master's degree in law) Bielecki, which in turn caused Kowalski's inferiority complex. Some saw Kowalski as a "fanatical politician," which did not win him any sympathy either. Dmowski could no longer help in resolving disputes and animosities. According to Giertych, in his last statements before he was paralyzed by the stroke, Dmowski recommended resistance to the mutation of Pilsudski's ideas, as reflected in Adolf Bocheński's famous book "Between Germany and Russia". He warned against actions against Czechoslovakia, especially expeditions into Russia to dismember it.

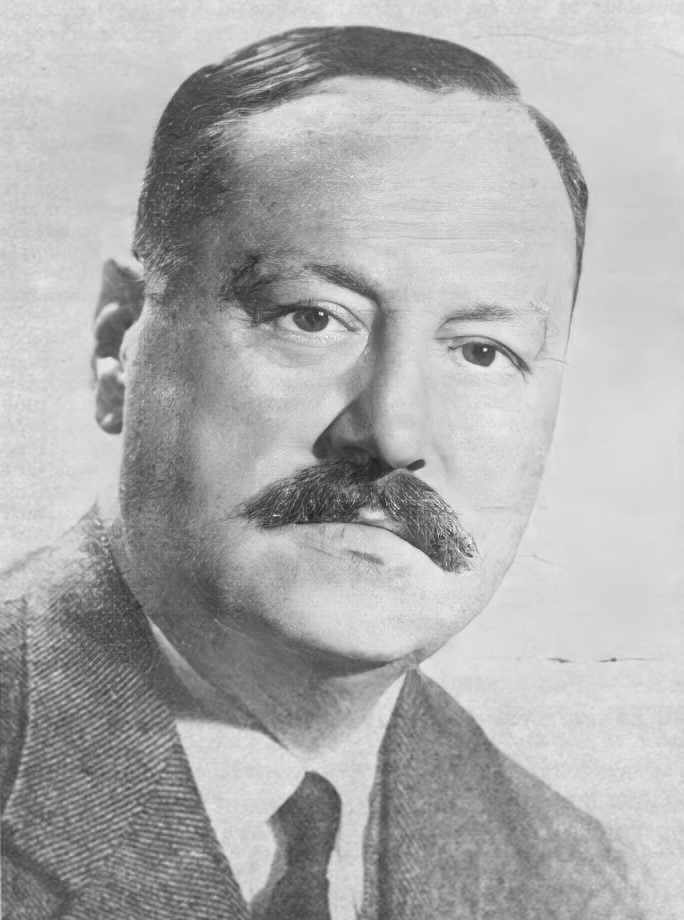
Tadeusz Bielecki - leader of SN

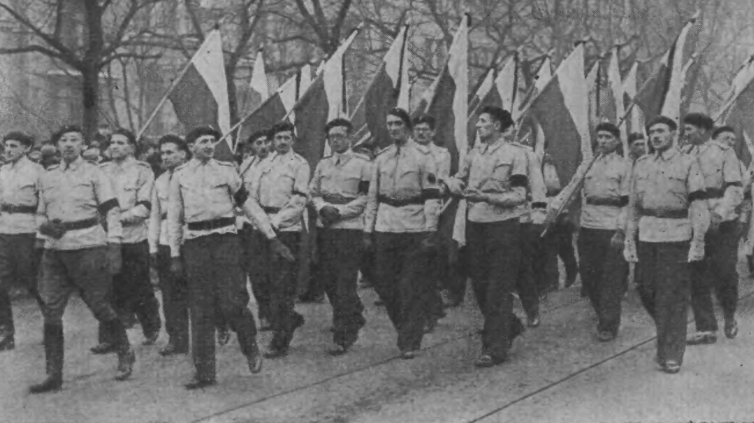
Stronnictwo Narodowe members at the funeral of Roman Dmowski, Warsaw 1939

In June 1939 Kowalski, and with him the entire Main Board, resigned. The professorial group on the Main Committee put forward Zygmunt Berezowski, the Committee's secretary, as a compromise candidate. In the end, Tadeusz Bielecki was recommended by a minimal majority, and on June 25, 1939, this choice was approved by the Supreme Council (one hundred and several dozen SN delegates from all over the country). The new Main Board included - besides Bielecki - Mieczyslaw Trajdos (vice-president), Witold T. Staniszkis (vice-president), Wladyslaw Jaworski, Stefan Sacha, Boguslaw Jeziorski, Napoleon Siemaszko, Stefan Niebudek, Antoni Orszagh, Jozef Szmydt. Despite the disagreements, the National Party, led by Bielecki, worked quite unanimously during the last months of peace for the unity of Poles in the face of the impending war. This contributed, after the September defeat, to its popularity and credibility, especially among the younger generation, disillusioned with the policies of the Sanation and resentful of the Left, especially after the Molotov-Ribbentrop Pact.

=== Times of war and occupation: 1939-1945 ===
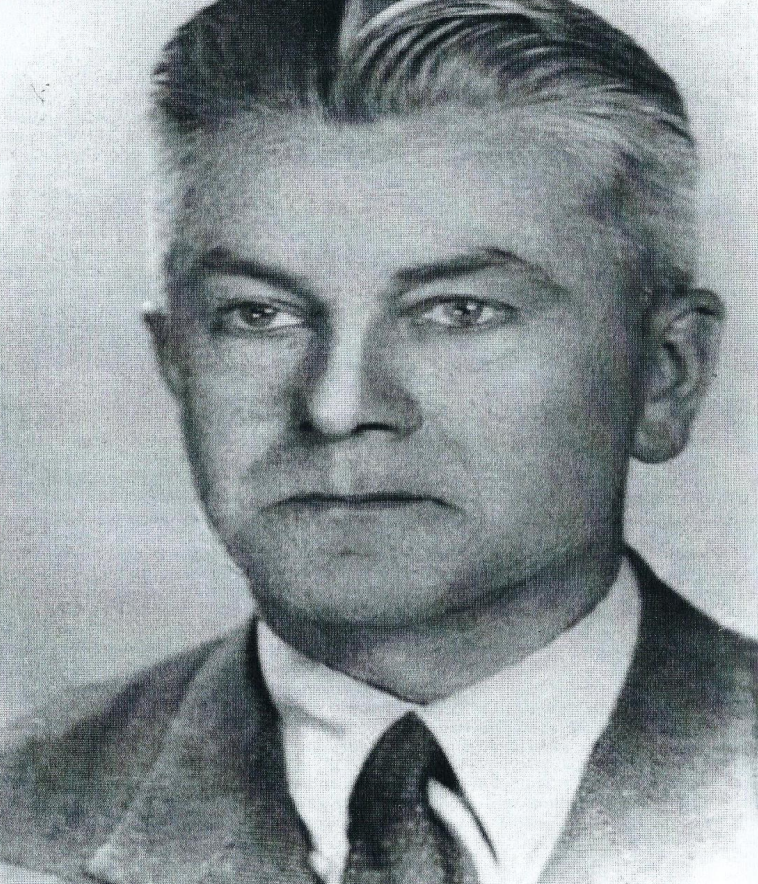
Mieczysław Trajdos - first leader of the wartime SN

==== Formation of the Underground Structures ====
Following the defeat of Poland in the September Campaign of 1939, the structures of the National Party (Stronnictwo Narodowe, SN) became significantly dispersed as a result of military operations, personnel losses, and the German and Soviet occupations.

As early as September 1939, the party leadership began preparations for underground activity.

During the occupation, the National Party was riven by the prewar rivalry between the supporters of Tadeusz Bielecki, the radical wing centered around Jędrzej Giertych, and the so-called “olds” national democrats. Disputes between these factions had a significant impact on the party’s activities and policies while it operated underground.

On 13 October 1939, the clandestine Presidium of the National Party's Main Executive Board was established in Warsaw. Mieczysław Trajdos assumed the position of acting chairman, replacing Tadeusz Bielecki, who was then in exile. Other members of the leadership included Witold Staniszkis, Bogusław Jeziorski, Roman Rybarski, and Zygmunt Berezowski. The appointment of the new leadership was the result of an agreement reached between Tadeusz Bielecki’s supporters and representatives of the so-called “olds.” As a result of this arrangement, the composition of the organization’s leadership and the distribution of key roles were determined, while activists associated with Jędrzej Giertych’s faction were removed from the leadership.

The formation of the National Party’s underground structures was complicated by the activities of independent nationalist organizations. The largest political center that attempted to compete with the new National Party leadership was the National-People’s Combat Organization (Narodowo-Ludowa Organizacja Walki, NLOW), associated with the Jędrzej Giertych faction, which in 1940 largely submitted to the National Party leadership. At the same time, local nationalist organizations also operated in Greater Poland, Kalisz, and Lwów, some of which were dismantled by the occupiers. One exception was the “Ojczyzna” organization, which cooperated with the Government Delegation and the Union of Armed Struggle (ZWZ) while maintaining formal independence.

==== Organization ====
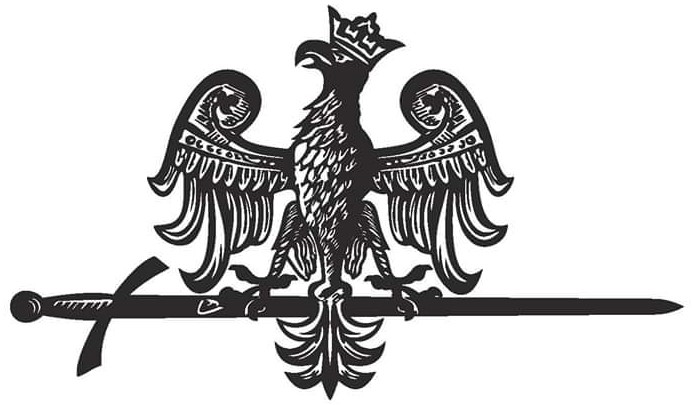
Emblem of the National Military Organization

The National Party operated through two parallel branches: a political branch and a military branch. The political branch was responsible for organizational, propaganda, and programmatic activities, while the military branch focused on cadre training and preparations for armed struggle.

Initially, the party's military arm was the Military Organization of the National Party (Organizacja Wojskowa Stronnictwa Narodowego), which was transformed into the National Military Organization (Narodowa Organizacja Wojskowa, NOW) in early 1940. Lieutenant Colonel Józef Rokicki was appointed its commander.

By early 1940, the National Party had rebuilt a substantial portion of its territorial structures in both the German-occupied territories and parts of the areas occupied by the Soviet Union.

==== Political Programme ====
One of the principal political objectives of the National Party during the war was the revision of the Polish–German border following an Allied victory. The party advocated the incorporation into Poland of Lower Silesia, Western Pomerania, East Prussia, and territories situated west of the Oder and Lusatian Neisse rivers.

This concept, known as the “Western Programme” (program zachodni), was later adopted by other underground political organizations and, by 1944, had become part of a broad national political consensus.

At the same time, the National Party rejected any possibility of ceding Poland's eastern territories to the Soviet Union.

==== Participation in the Polish Underground State ====
Emblem of Polish Underground State

From 1940 onward, representatives of the National Party participated in the work of the Political Consultative Committee, which served as the political counterpart of the Union of Armed Struggle (ZWZ).

The National Party was one of the so-called “Big Four” political organizations that formed the political foundation of the Polish Underground State, alongside the Polish Socialist Party, the People's Party, and the Labour Party.

Party representatives also participated in the activities of the Government Delegation for Poland and the Council of National Unity.

==== Split and the Formation of the National Armed Forces ====
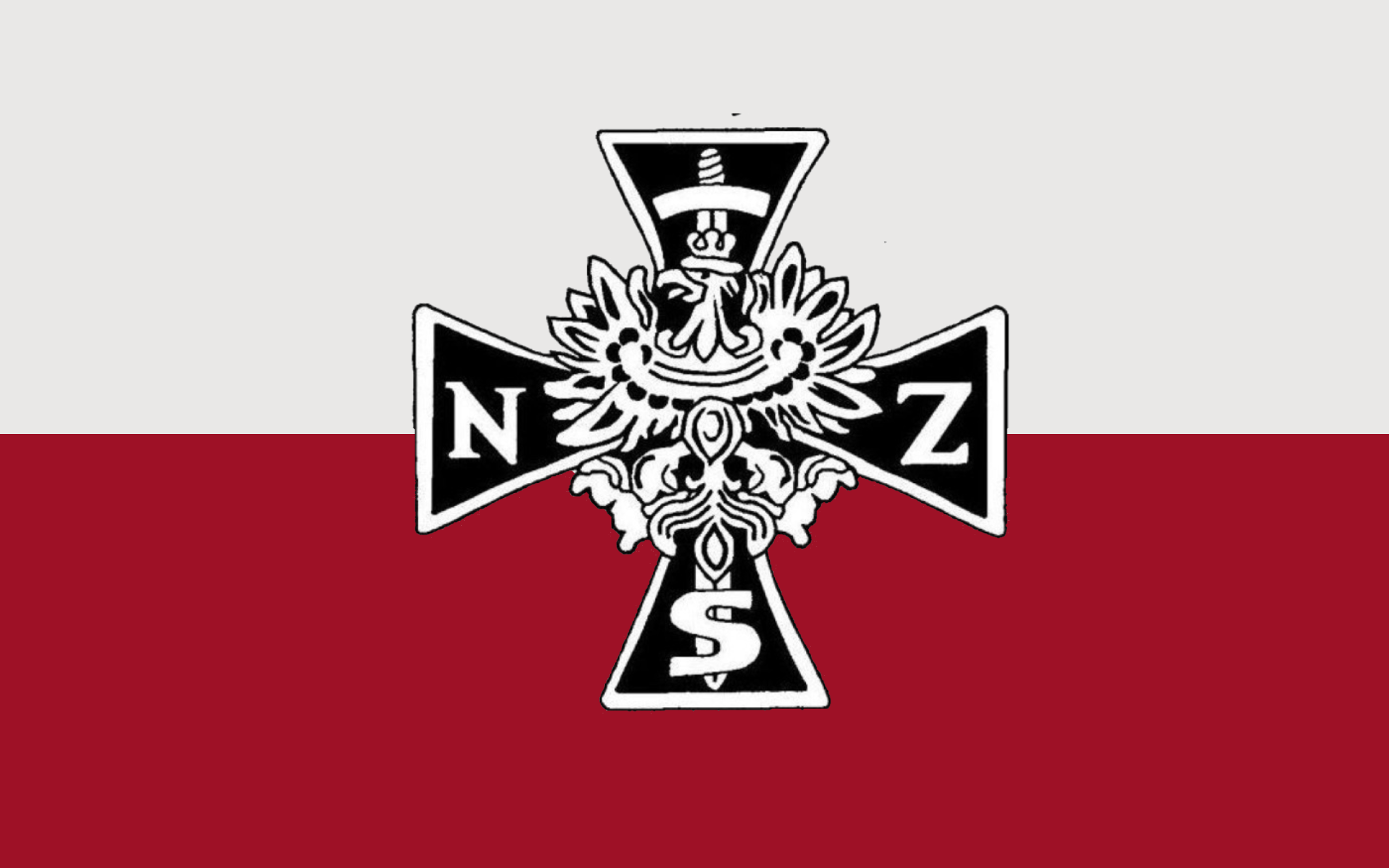
Flag of National Military Forces (NSZ)

Disagreements regarding cooperation with the ZWZ–AK and other underground organizations led to a split within the National Party in 1942.

In July 1942, a faction of activists established a separate leadership centre, later referred to as the National Party “Great Poland” (SN "Wielka Polska"). At the same time, part of the NOW military structures, together with members of the Lizard Union, formed the National Armed Forces (NSZ). The majority of NOW units, however, remained loyal to the National Party leadership and were subsequently incorporated into the Home Army.

==== Warsaw Uprising ====
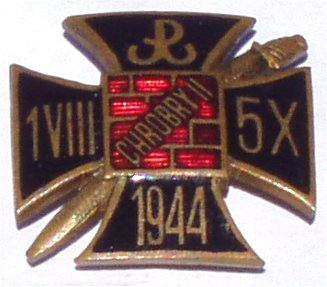
Badge of Chrobry II Battalion

Representatives of the National Party unsuccessfully attempted to prevent the outbreak of the Warsaw Uprising. Once the fighting began, NOW–AK and NSZ units subordinated themselves to the insurgent command structure.

Particularly strong was the Warsaw District of the National Party, commanded by Tadeusz Maciński ("Prus"), which numbered approximately 5,000 members. Its members fought in, among others, the “Gustaw”, “Harnaś”, and “Antoni” battalions, as well as the “Chrobry II” combat group. Combat losses reached 2/3 of the initial forces. The collapse of the uprising led to the complete disintegration of the Warsaw District of the National Party structures.

==== Activities after 1944 ====
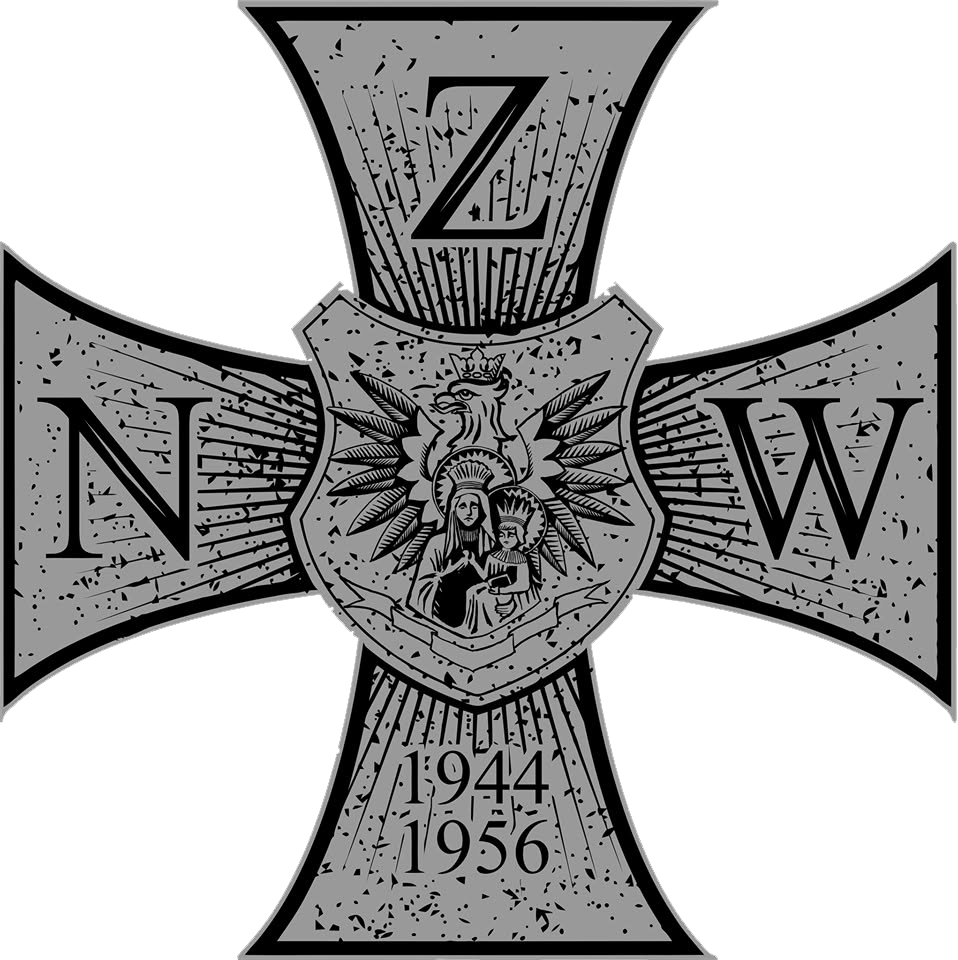
Cross of the National Military Union

Following the occupation of Polish territory by the Red Army, the National Party continued its underground activities. In November 1944, the party decided to establish the National Military Union (Narodowe Zjednoczenie Wojskowe, NZW), which brought together the military structures of the nationalist underground.

During the 1946 Polish people's referendum, the party campaigned against the abolition of the Senate and the nationalization of industry, while supporting the retention of Poland's western border along the Oder and Lusatian Neisse rivers.

==== Legalization Attempts ====
After the war ended, some members of the National Party, particularly those of the older generation, hoped to resume legal political activity. To this end, on 23 August 1945, the National Party’s Legalization Committee was established, which submitted a request to the authorities to register the party. The authors of the petition declared their readiness to participate in the country’s reconstruction and emphasized their commitment to national and Catholic traditions. However, this initiative was not fully coordinated with the SN’s underground leadership. Both the legalization request and subsequent reminders went unanswered, and some committee members were arrested.

At the same time, some activists began working within legally operating institutions. Some of them became involved in the work of the Western Institute formed by Zygmunt Wojciechowski in Poznań and the Ministry of Recovered Territories, participating in the development of concepts for the development and repolonization of the lands annexed to Poland after the war. Others became involved with legally operating political and social circles, including the Labor Party or the “Today and Tomorrow” movement centered around Bolesław Piasecki.

=== Repression after 1945 ===
Following the establishment of communist rule in Poland, the National Party became one of the principal targets of the security apparatus. The party rejected the legitimacy of the Soviet-backed government, continued to recognize the Polish Government-in-Exile as the lawful authority of the Polish state, and opposed the incorporation of Poland's eastern territories into the Soviet Union.

Between 1945 and 1946, the Ministry of Public Security (UB), supported by Soviet security services, systematically dismantled the party's underground structures. Numerous members of the party leadership were arrested, imprisoned, or forced into exile. By the end of 1946, most of the central authorities of the organization had been destroyed through a series of arrests.

The arrest of Tadeusz Maciński on 23 December 1946 is generally regarded as marking the symbolic end of the National Party's central underground leadership in post-war Poland. Despite the liquidation of the party's command structures, many rank-and-file activists remained active in the anti-communist underground, particularly within the National Military Union (NZW).

Between 1945 and 1956, hundreds of SN activists—both prominent figures and regular members—lost their lives in armed combat, executions, and prisons. Among those executed, murdered in prison, or who died in custody were Adam Doboszyński, Włodzimierz Marszewski, Jan Kaim, Stanisław Mierzwiński, Lech Haydukiewicz, Leon Dziubecki, and Adam Mirecki, among others.

Although isolated local structures survived into the early 1950s, the anti-communist underground associated with the National Party was gradually eliminated by the state security services. The last known SN–NZW structures, operating in the Bielsk Podlaski area, laid down their arms and revealed themselves during the political thaw of October 1956.

== Policies ==
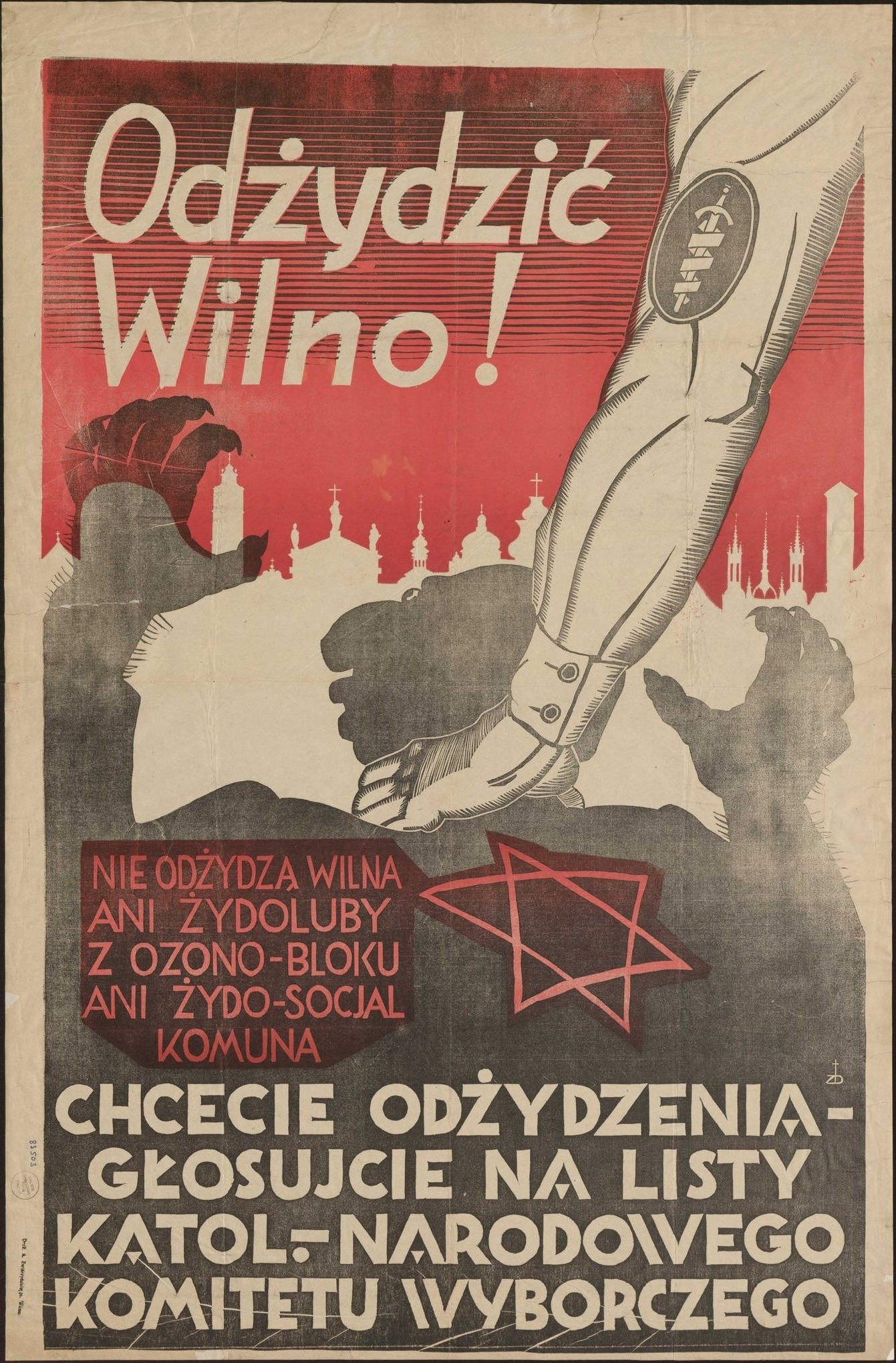
De-Judeize Wilno! - anti-Semitic election poster of the Catholic National Electoral Committee, hung up on the occasion of the 1939 Wilno city council elections.

The main goal of the party was the construction of a Catholic Polish State, through combining the principles of Catholicism and Nationalism. The party advocated a hierarchical organisation of society and the transformation of the political system by increasing the role of the Polish National elite within the country.

It had the most influential political centres in Greater Poland, Pomerania, Warsaw, Wilno and Lwów. Prominent leaders of the old generation included Stanisław Stroński, Marian Seyda, Roman Rybarski, Stanisław Głąbiński, Witold Staniszkis, Wacław Komarnicki, Jan Zamorski, Jan Załuska and Stanisław Rymar. The young generation was represented by Tadeusz Bielecki, Jędrzej Giertych, Kazimierz Kowalski, Adam Doboszyński, Karol Stojanowski, Tadeusz Dworak, Karol Frycz, Witold Nowosad and Stefan Sacha.

== After World War II ==
During the period of the Polish People's Republic the organization was outlawed in Poland but continued in the Polish emigration with a major center in London. It was re-established in Warsaw in 1989 by Jan Ostoj Matłachowski, Leon Mirecki, Maciej Giertych, Bogusław Jeznach, Bogusław Rybicki, and others. The new SN was officially registered on 21 August 1990 in sovereign Poland after the fall of communism in 1989. Most of its members eventually entered the League of Polish Families (LPR) and dissolved the National Party in 2001.

== Party symbols ==
Emblem of National Party

Emblem of the Youth Section of National Party

Banner of Stronnictwo Narodowe in Zblewo

== Electoral results ==
=== Sejm ===
Election year	# of votes	% of vote	# of overall seats won	Government
1930	1,443,165	12.7 (#2)	63 / 460	BBWR
