= Camp of Great Poland =

Historical political organization in Poland

Camp of Great Poland Obóz Wielkiej Polski
- Abbreviation: OWP
- Leader: Roman Dmowski
- Governing body: Great Council
- Founder: Roman Dmowski
- Founded: 4 December 1926; 99 years ago
- Banned: 28 March 1933; 93 years ago
- Succeeded by: OWP (2003)
- Headquarters: Warsaw, Poland
- Youth wing: Ruch Młodych Obozu Wielkiej Polski
- Ideology: Corporativism; Authoritarianism; National Catholicism; Polish nationalism
- Political position: Right-wing to Far-right
- National affiliation: Popular National Union (from 1926); National Party (from 1928)
- Slogan: Czołem Wielkiej Polsce ("Hail Great Poland")
- Anthem: "Hymn Młodych" ("Youth Anthem")

Camp of Great Poland (Polish: Obóz Wielkiej Polski, OWP) was a far-right, nationalist political organization of National Democracy in interwar Poland.

== History ==
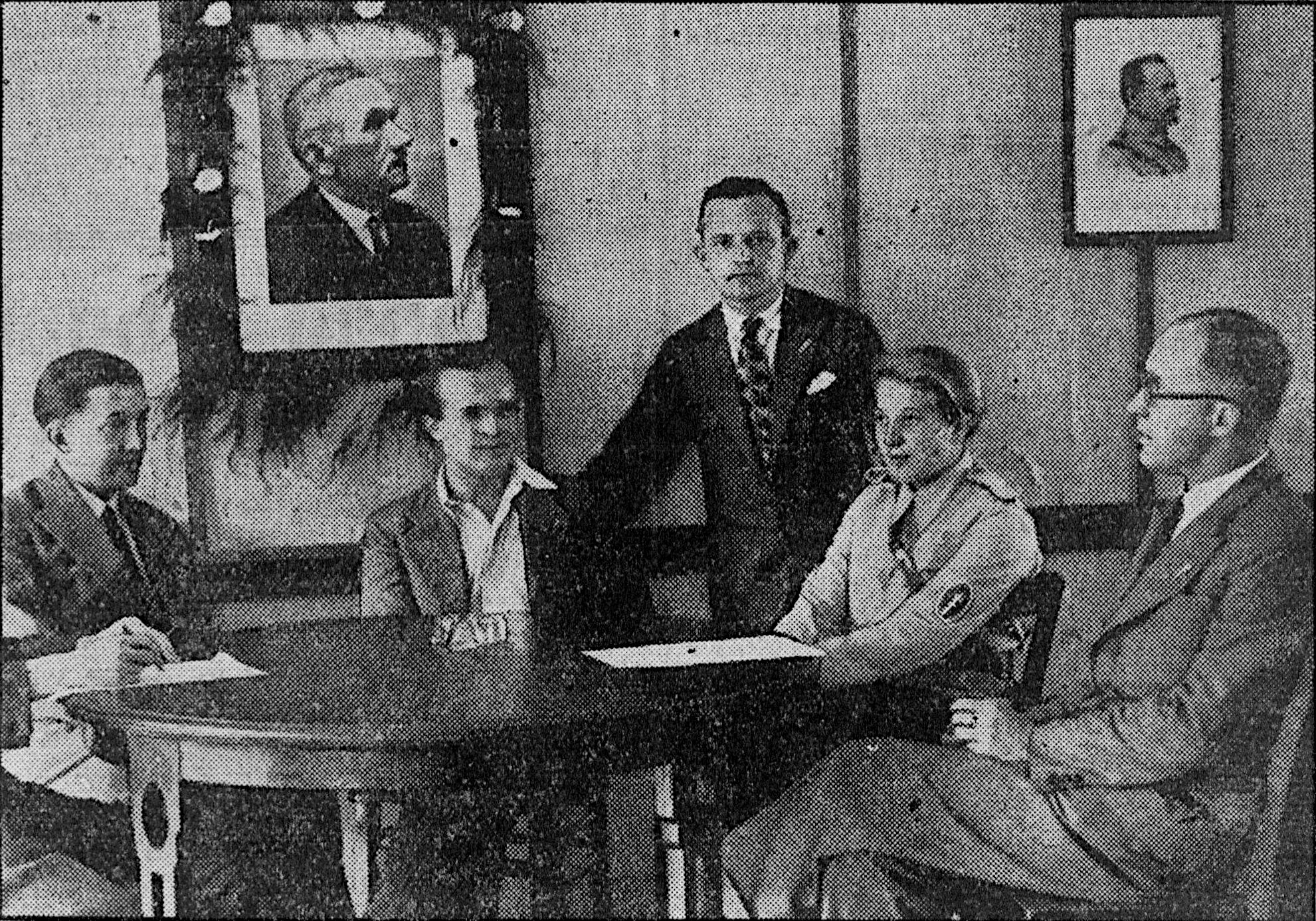
Members of the Youth Movement of Great Poland Camp, including athlete and olympic medalist Jadwiga Wajs in organizational uniform. On the walls, portraits of Roman Dmowski and General Józef Haller.

Camp of Great Poland was founded on 4 December 1926 in Poznań by Popular National Union (Związek Ludowo-Narodowy, ZLN) and other organizations of right-wing National Democracy political camp, led by Roman Dmowski, to unite Polish right-wing organizations and oppose sanacja regime, which gained power following Józef Piłsudski's May Coup in 1926. After merging with National Pupulist Union in 1928 OWP retained its autonomy within newly established National Party (Polish: Stronnictwo Narodowe).

In 1927, a youth branch of the organization was established (Polish: Ruch Młodych Obozu Wielkiej Polski), which virtually dominated OWP by 1928. OWP positions in Polish universities among students were especially strong, it also gained popularity among workers and the lower middle class. In January 1930, Camp of Great Poland had 35,000 members, in May 1932, its membership reached 120,000. By 1933 OWP claimed to have had a quarter of a million followers.

Outbreaks of the anti-Jewish violence in Eastern Galicia in 1927 led the organization to be banned in that region that year. After a further wave of nationwide violence in 1933, OWP was eventually banned nationally. The government, alarmed by rapid growth of OWP, banned the organization together with its youth movement on 28 March 1933. on the grounds that these organizations threatened stability of the state. After dissolution of the organization, even more radical young members of OWP formed the National Radical Camp (Polish: Obóz Narodowo Radykalny, ONR). ONR would be banned soon after its establishment, in 1934.

== Organization ==
Camp of Great Poland was led by the Great Council (Polish: Wielka Rada). The head of the council, with the title of the Great Camp-maker (Polish: Wielki Oboźny) was Roman Dmowski; other notable members included Tadeusz Bielecki, Marian Borzęcki, Stanisław Haller and Roman Rybarski.

== Views ==
Camp of Great Poland supported strongly religious corporative authoritarianism, borrowing some ideas from Italian Fascism.

OWP did not pursue its goals on the political scene, increasingly controlled by Piłsudskiite Sanacja; instead it aimed to create a violent, revolutionary movement aimed at toppling the government. Camp of Great Poland even had its own fighting squads organized.

An OWP front organization, the Green Ribbon League (Polish: Liga Zielonej Wstążki), actively propagated a boycott of the Jewish-owned businesses. In early 1930s OWP campaigned for numerus nullus, a policy of complete exclusion of Jewish students and academics from Polish universities. OWP anti-Jewish activities weren't however limited to political means only. OWP openly incited anti-Jewish riots, and its youth movement advocated violence against Jewish students. OWP and related youth organizations were engaged in violent attacks against Jews. Those attacks eventually led the Polish government to ban the organization.

== Today's Poland ==
Organization was many times re-established, the first time as political party in Lublin (1993) by prof. Jan Trochimiak. After founded in 2003 as an ordinary association in Wroclaw. Finally, in 2012 the OWP was registered in the National Registrar of Companies and Legal Entities (Krajowy Rejestr Sądowy; KRS) in Warsaw, gaining legal personality. Honorary chairman of the OWP is Jan Kobylański.

== See also ==
- Camp of Great Poland (association)
