= Bratnia Pomoc =

Brotherly Help
- Bratnia Pomoc
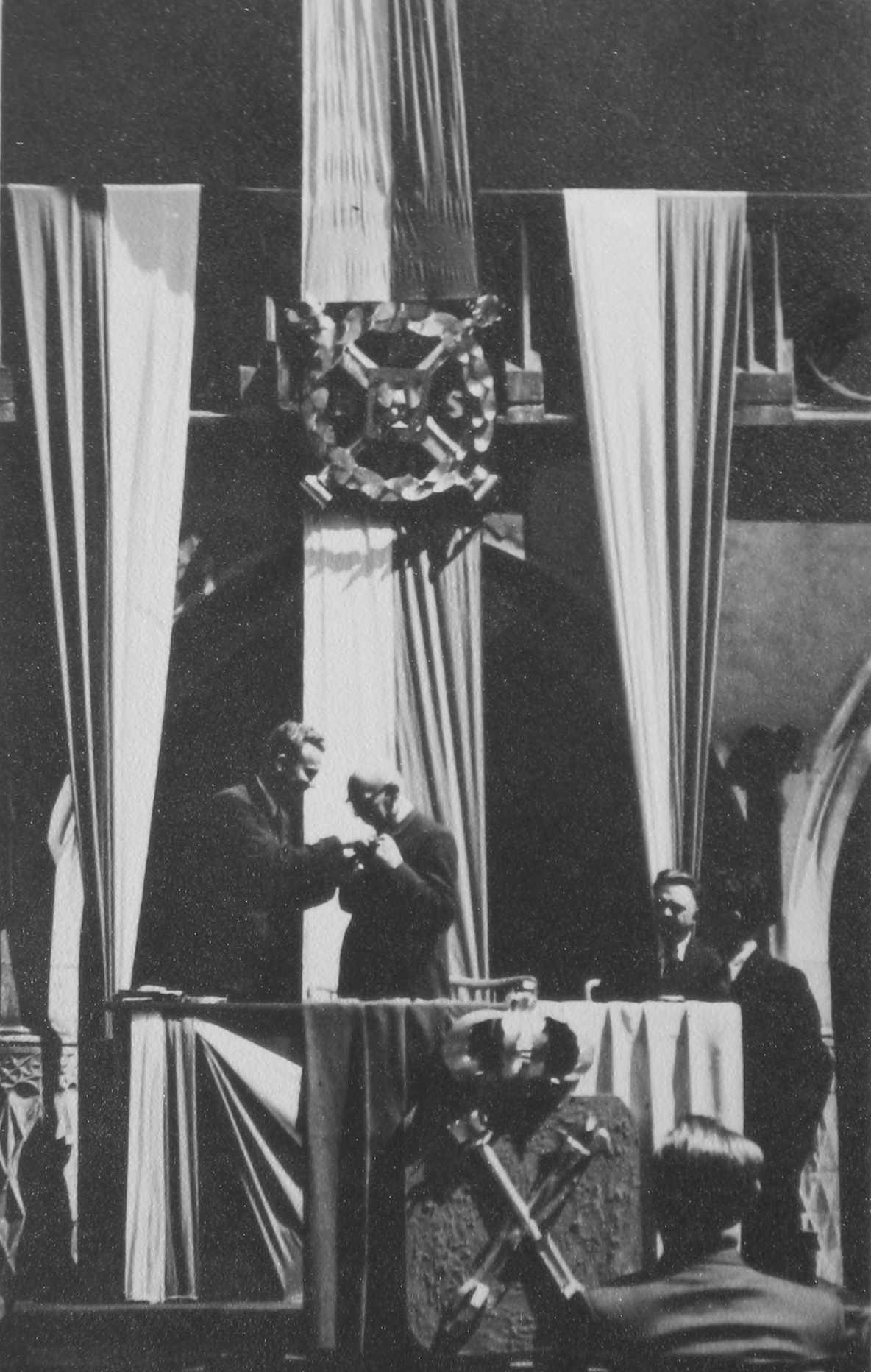
- Bratniak celebrations at the Jagiellonian University in May 1947
- Formation: 1859
- Official language: Polish

Bratnia Pomoc (English: Brotherly Help), also known as Bratniak, was a popular Polish students’ mutual aid organization. The first branch of Bratniak was created in 1859 at the Jagiellonian University. Thirty years later, in 1889, another branch was opened at the University of Warsaw.

== History ==
Bratnia Pomoc was originally aimed at helping less affluent students by providing them with loans and scholarships. In addition, its members also organized cheap cafeterias for those who could not afford more expensive food. The Brotherly Help also contributed to the efforts to educate the populations of Polish towns and villages and to hinder their Russification and Germanisation.

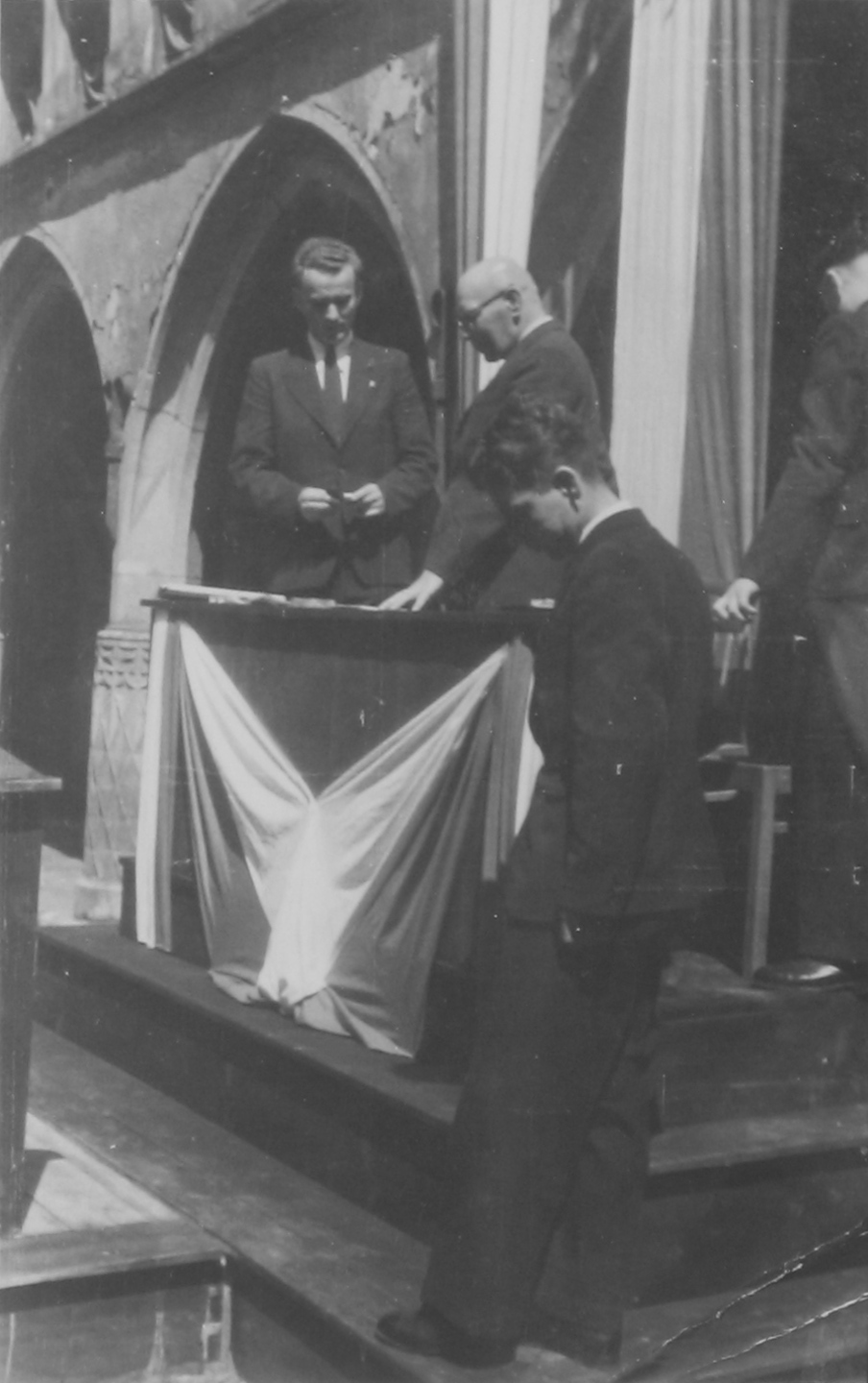
Another photograph of Bratniak celebrations at the Jagiellonian University in May 1947

In the interbellum period, Bratnia Pomoc maintained offices at most Polish colleges and universities, including University of Warsaw, Jagiellonian University and Jan Kazimierz University of Lwów. Outside of Poland, the organization was also active on the territory of the Free City of Gdańsk, assisting students of the present day Gdańsk University of Technology, at the time Technische Hochschule der Freien Stadt Danzig. Most branches of Bratniak, however, were in the 1930s dominated by the nationalist Academic Union “All Polish Youth”.

During the Second World War, under the Nazi German occupation, Bratniak branches functioned at the illegal, underground Polish universities.

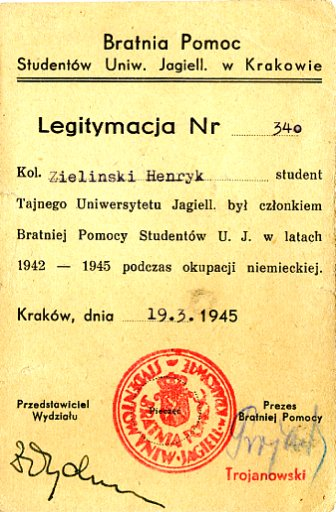
Document stating Bratniak membership at the Jagiellonian University during the Nazi German occupation of Poland

After the war, Brotherly Help existed until the early fifties, when it was first politicized and subsequently dissolved and replaced by the communist Zrzeszenie Studentów Polskich (Association of Polish Students). Bratnia Pomoc in its traditional, non-communist form was recreated after 1989.

== Bibliography ==
- (in Polish) Information about Bratniak at www.muzeum.warszawa1939.pl
- (in Polish) J.Włodarski, Zarys historii politechniki w Gdańsku do 1945 roku – historia "Bratniaka"
