= Society for the Promotion of Polish Industry and Trade "Rozwój" =

Polish political organisation

Rozwój
- Society for the Promotion of Polish Industry and Trade "Rozwój"
- Towarzystwo Popierania Przemysłu i Handlu Polskiego „Rozwój” (Polish)
- Established: 1913
- Members: c.80,000 (1923)
- Official language: Polish
- Key people: Karol Rzepecki
- Publication: Gazeta Niedzielna

The Society for the Promotion of Polish Industry and Trade "Rozwój" (Polish: Towarzystwo Popierania Przemysłu i Handlu Polskiego „Rozwój”) (Note: Also functioned under the names Towarzystwo Rozwoju Życia Narodowego w Polsce, Towarzystwo Rozwoju Przemysłu, Rzemiosł i Handlu „Rozwój”, and Związek Popierania Polskiego Stanu Posiadania from 1923.) was a Polish political organisation founded in 1913.

== History ==
Rozwój brought together Christian democratic and nationalist craftsmen and petite bourgeoise.The organisation published the newspaper Gazeta Niedzielna. It peaked in 1923, when it had around 80,000 members, and declined afterwards. Its main activists were Tadeusz Mścisław Dymowski, Tadeusz Karszo-Siedlewski, Karol Rzepecki, Maria Buyno-Arctowa.
