= Jędrzej Giertych =

Polish politician, journalist, and writer (1903–1992)

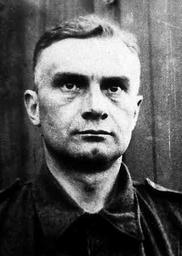
- Portrait, c. 1945

Personal details
- Born: 7 January 1903 Sosnowiec, Congress Poland, Russian Empire
- Died: 9 October 1992 (aged 89) London, United Kingdom
- Party: National Party
- Spouse: Maria Łuczkiewicz
- Children: Nine
- Education: University of Warsaw
- Occupation: Publicist, diplomat

Jędrzej Giertych (7 January 1903 – 9 October 1992) was a Polish right-wing politician, journalist and writer.

== Biography ==
Jędrzej Giertych was born in Sosnowiec on 7 January 1903, the son of Franciszek Giertych (1868–1938), an engineer. He had seven daughters and two sons: the Polish politician Maciej Giertych and the Catholic theologian and Vatican official Wojciech Giertych. Among his 29 grandchildren is the Polish politician Roman Giertych.

During World War I he attended for a time a German-language Lutheran school in Tallinn, Estonia, then part of the Russian Empire, where his father was deputy manager of a shipyard. His family later moved to Petrograd where they experienced the Russian Revolution, returning to Poland in 1918 after the treaty of Brest-Litovsk.

He was injured at the Battle of Warsaw in 1920 and then became war correspondent during the Spanish Civil War, supportive of the Nationalists, especially of the Carlists. His reports were later published in book form, Hiszpania bohaterska (Heroic Spain).

Active politically mainly in the interwar period, Giertych was an ally of Roman Dmowski and a prominent activist of the National Democracy right-wing political camp, mainly the National Party. He was a member of the Central Committee of the party and was elected to be a member of the Warsaw City Council. Giertych support anti-Jewish boycotts, point out that the boycott in Odrzywol in 1935 led to the liquidation of all the Jewish market stalls and their replacement by 200 Polish stalls.

During World War II he was mobilised into the Polish Navy. His unit was soon encircled in the course of the battle for the Hel Peninsula, but he surrendered only on 2 October 1939 and was captured by Germans. He was the first Polish 'incorrigible escaper' to be imprisoned in the Colditz POW camp Oflag IVC. Moved with the Colditz Polish contingent to Oflag VI-B at Dossel, he was one of the survivors when on 27 September 1944 a British bomb carried by a Mosquito aircraft of No. 139 Squadron RAF, aimed at nearby Kassel, hit the camp in error and killed 90 Polish prisoners. His sister was a member of the Home Army and was wounded during the Warsaw Uprising.

After the war he exiled himself to England, together with his family. During communist rule in Poland, Giertych lived in London, working as a school-teacher. He died in London on 9 October 1992.

== Political views ==
Giertych spent his political life aiming to build a Poland made up of nationalist traditionalist Catholic citizens ready to sacrifice their life for what he called the "greater good of Poland". Giertych represented the radical "youth faction" of the National Party. They were sceptic as to the need of the parliamentary system, aiming to change the political system of Poland. In 1938 he observed: "We [young faction] rather grew up as a reaction against the spirit of the 19th century, whose most classic effects were socialism, liberalism, parliamentarism." As to the goals of the "young faction" and the relations with fascism and Nazism, Giertych remarked: "We observe very carefully fascism, hitlerism and other foreign national movements, because we think we can learn a lot from them. We try to learn from their experience, use their lucky ideas, take all positive what they created. Our goal is to take the power in Poland."

The Jewish-run Anti-Defamation League describes Jędrzej Giertych as having been "notorious for his obsessive anti-Semitism and open admiration of fascism".

After the 1956 events, Giertych belonged to the emigres who voiced support for Gomułka. While living in exile in London, Giertych was expelled from the emigre National Party because of his extremism and antisemitism. He also strongly criticised the Workers' Defence Committee (KOR). While the Catholic church considered converts equally, Giertych advocated for restrictions based on a racial approach saying that "baptism can turn a Jew only into a Christian, not into a Pole, and such converts ought to be restricted in their rights just like their Jewish brethren".

In a series of newspaper articles of 1939, Giertych suggested that "in the upcoming war" Poland ought to annex "the city of Danzig, East Prussia, upper and central Silesia, including the city of Breslau, and central Pomerania, including Kolberg"; moreover, Poland ought to create "a bunch of buffer states" between the rest of Germany and Poland along the rivers Oder and Neisse.

== Works ==
- My Młode Pokolenie (We, the Young Generation) (1929)
- Tragizm losów Polski (1936)
- Hiszpania bohaterska (Heroic Spain) (1937)
- O wyjście z kryzysu (1938)
- Polityka polska w dziejach Europy (Polish Politics in the History of Europe) (1947)
- Polityka polska w dziejach Europy. Polityka Olszowskiego (1953)
- U źródeł katastrofy dziejowej Polski: Jan Amos Komensky (1964)
- Kulisy powstania styczniowego (1965)
- Rola dziejowa Dmowskiego (Historic Role of Dmowski) (1968)
- W obliczu zamachu na Kościół (1969)
- Polski Obóz Narodowy (Polish National Camp) (1977, 1978)
- Józef Piłsudski 1914–19 (1979–1982)
- Rozważania o Bitwie Warszawskiej 1920-go roku (1984)
- O Piłsudskim (On Piłsudski) (1987)
