= National League (Poland, 1893) =

Polish political organization

National League Liga Narodowa (Polish)
- Founded: 1 April 1893
- Dissolved: 1927
- Ideology: National Democracy; Corporatism
- Political position: Right-wing

National League (Polish: Liga Narodowa) was a conspirational Polish organization active in all three partitions. It was founded in April 1893 from the transformed Polish League. National League was the first organization of the nascent National Democracy movement. Its main ideologues were Roman Dmowski, Jan Ludwik Popławski and Zygmunt Balicki.

Its goals were formation of modern Polish nation and regaining of Polish statehood in the long run. It supported the idea of solidarity of all social classes in order to strengthen the national idea. National League, organizing mostly young intelligentsia, aimed at mobilizing Polish youth and awakening Polish peasants to take active part in public life. The organization was opposed to the idea of class struggle and the activities of national minorities in Poland. It published the Przegląd Wszechpolski (The All-Poland Review) and Polak (The Pole) newspapers in Lwów.

It was disbanded in 1927.
