= Maciej Giertych =

Polish politician

Maciej Marian Giertych
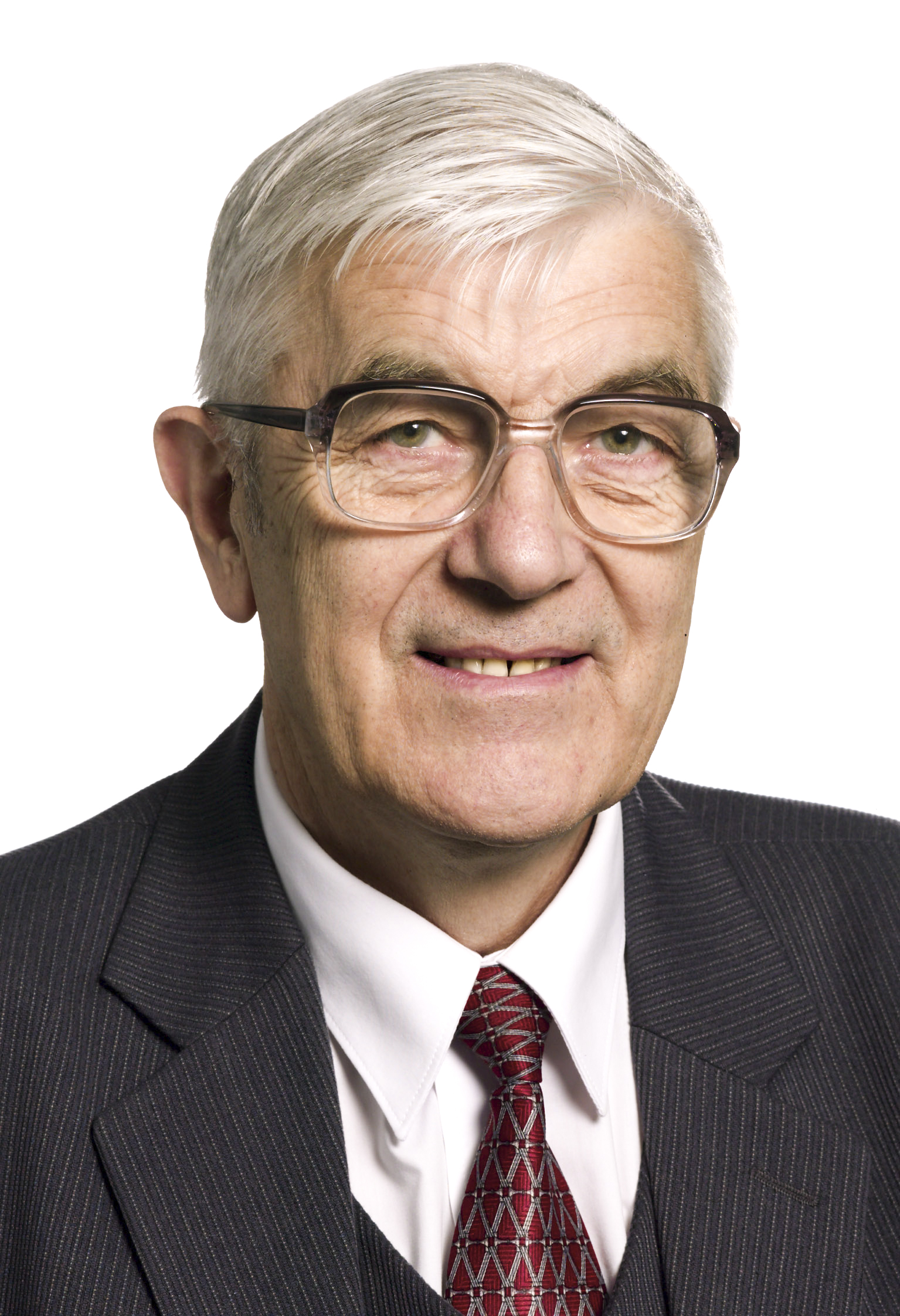

Member of the European Parliament for Poland
- In office 2004–2009

Personal details
- Born: 24 March 1936 (age 90) Warsaw, Poland
- Party: League of Polish Families
- Spouse: Antonina Giertych née Jachink
- Education: Oxford University, University of Toronto
- Scientific career
- Fields: Tree genetics and Tree physiology

Maciej Marian Giertych (['mat͡ɕɛj ˈmarjan ˈɡʲɛrtɨx], born 24 March 1936 in Warsaw) is a Polish dendrologist and former right wing politician of the League of Polish Families (LPR). He favours state intervention in the economy. He was a member of the Sejm (between 2001 and 2004) and a Polish member of the European Parliament (from 2004 to 2009). He was a candidate in the 2005 Polish presidential elections, but withdrew from the race because of low vote results (circa 3%). He is a notable creationist.

== Biography ==
Maciej Giertych was born on 24 March 1936 in Warsaw, the son of notable writer politician of the nationalist National Democracy movement Jędrzej Giertych and his wife Maria. Giertych was one of nine children, including his brother Wojciech Giertych, O.P., Theologian of the Papal Household and professor of theology at the Pontifical University of Saint Thomas Aquinas, Angelicum in Rome. Two of his sisters also entered religious life.

In late 1945 his family left Poland for post-war Germany's British zone and finally settled in the United Kingdom. In 1954 Giertych passed his final school exams and entered Oxford University, where he founded the Polish Students Club during his studies. He received the BA and MA in forestry. Between 1958 and 1962 he studied at the University of Toronto, where he received his PhD for studies on plant physiology.

In 1962, Giertych returned to Poland, where he completed his qualifications for an assistant professorship at the Institute of Dendrology of the Polish Academy of Sciences (PAN) in Kórnik near Poznań. In 1964 he married Antonina Giertych, née Jachnik. In 1970, he received his Habilitation degree for his studies on forest genetics at the Agricultural University of Poznań. Since 1976, he has lectured at the Nicolaus Copernicus University of Toruń. He has also published more than 200 works and studies, mostly on forest-related topics. The same year he became a member of the Forest Sciences Committee of the PAN. In 1981 he received the grade of associate professor and in November 1989 of full professor.

In 1986, Giertych joined the advisory council (Rada Konsultacyjna), made up of opposition members and party officials set up by the leader of the communist authorities, Wojciech Jaruzelski. He continuously showed his support for General Jaruzelski, and supported the alliance between Poland and the Soviet Union. The council included several prominent Poles such as Marek Kotański, Krzysztof Skubiszewski and Kazimierz Dejmek, but also leading members of the communist party. He also served as the Polish representative to the International Union of Forest Research Organisations from 1986 to 1995.

After the fall of the communist regime in Poland in 1990, Giertych continued his scientific work; between 1993 and 2000 he was an advisor to the Ministry of Environmental Affairs. In 1990 he was a member of one of the minor political parties, the National Party of Poland (Stronnictwo Narodowe). Most of its members eventually entered the League of Polish Families (LPR) and dissolved the National Party.

On 23 September 2001 Giertych was elected to the Polish Parliament from a Poznań constituency. On 16 June 2004 he became a Member of the European Parliament for the LPR. Together with the rest of his party he sits as a Non-attached Member. Giertych's son Roman led the LPR in the past.

== Political views ==
Maciej Giertych opposed lifting the ban on purchase of land in Poland by foreigners (due to fears of resurgence of German colonialism), homosexuality and moral relativism. He criticized and opposed Poland's entry into the European Union. He has supported closer ties with Eastern European countries (especially Russia), as well as defending Polish industry against what he regards as the unfair practices of western companies. He is also against the proposed European Constitution. In general, the views of Maciej Giertych are in line with the ideology of Radio Maryja, a media group and political-religious channel of religiously conservative parties in Poland. However, since 2014 and take over by Law and Justice, he deeply opposes it.

During his discourse Giertych had explicitly condemned National Socialism and insisted Benito Mussolini and Adolf Hitler also had an "atheistic and socialistic taste about them". He praised Francisco Franco, António Salazar and Éamon de Valera, as guardsmen of traditional European values, in the same address to the European Parliament.

In February 2007, Giertych sparked outrage among European Union officials and Jewish organizations by publishing a brochure called "Civilisations at war in Europe" that claimed Jews create their own "ghettos" because they supposedly prefer to separate themselves from others. A number of journalists and certain Jewish organizations considered the brochure to be antisemitic.

During the European Parliament's session on 14 March 2007, Parliament's President Hans-Gert Pöttering reprimanded Maciej Giertych for the content of his pamphlet in accordance with Rule 147 of the EP's Rules of Procedure. He said that the publication was "a serious breach of fundamental rights and, in particular, the dignity of human beings to which our institution so strongly adheres". Pöttering dissociated the Parliament from the work saying that it had made no financial contribution to its publication. Several members of the Parliament have joined with the European Jewish Congress in calling for an investigation of the publishing of the pamphlet and whether Parliament funds were involved.

== Creationist views ==
Giertych supports a version of creationism that attributes the creation of the universe, life, and its further development to an act of God's will. He is an honorary member of the Daylight Origins Society, a creationist organisation based in the United Kingdom.

In his foreword to Gerard Keane's 1999 book Creation Rediscovered, Giertych documented how his views changed from assuming evolution is true to being skeptical of it.

In 2006, Giertych rebutted the accusation that he advocated teaching creationism in schools. He stated, "I am a scientist—a population geneticist with a degree from Oxford University and a PhD from the University of Toronto—and I am critical of the theory of evolution as a scientist, with no religious connotation."

On 11 October 2006 Giertych introduced and moderated a pro-creationist seminar held in Brussels for members of the European Parliament; The title of the presentation was Teaching evolutionary theory in Europe. Is your child being indoctrinated in the classroom?

In 2008, Giertych appeared in Ben Stein's movie Expelled: No Intelligence Allowed (credited as Marciej Giertych). The documentary features Giertych talking about his views on the theory of evolution.

== See also ==
- 2005 Polish presidential election
- Radio Maryja
