= Recovered Territories =

Former eastern territories of Germany that became parts of Poland

Map showing Poland's borders pre-1938 and post-1945. The Eastern Borderlands is in gray while the Recovered Territories are in pink.

The Recovered Territories or Regained Lands (Polish: Ziemie Odzyskane), also known as the Western Borderlands (Polish: Kresy Zachodnie), and previously as the Western and Northern Territories (Polish: Ziemie Zachodnie i Północne), Postulated Territories (Polish: Ziemie Postulowane) and Returning Territories (Polish: Ziemie Powracające), was an official term used in the Polish People's Republic to describe the former eastern territories of Germany and the Free City of Danzig that became part of Poland after World War II, at which time most of their German inhabitants were forcibly deported. The term was a political propaganda expression and was systematically employed by Poland's post-war communist government to legitimize the annexation of these territories and the expulsion of the German population.

The rationale for the term "Recovered" was that these territories had formed part of the medieval Polish state, and were lost by Poland in different periods over the centuries. It also referred to the Piast Concept that these territories were part of the traditional Polish homeland under the Piast dynasty (small parts of these territories remained under Polish rule even after the end of the Piast dynasty), after the establishment of the state in the Middle Ages. The length of time these territories had been under Polish rule varied considerably. Over the centuries, they had become predominantly German-speaking through the processes of German eastward settlement (Ostsiedlung), political expansion, and language shift due to Germanisation of the local Polish, Slavic and Baltic Prussian population. Therefore, aside from certain regions such as West Upper Silesia, Warmia and Masuria, as of 1945 most of these territories did not contain sizeable Polish-speaking communities.

The great majority of the previous inhabitants either fled from the territories during the later stages of the war or were expelled by the Soviet and Polish communist authorities after the war ended, although a small German minority remains in some places. The territories were resettled with Poles who moved from central Poland, Polish repatriates forced to leave areas of former eastern Poland that had been annexed by the Soviet Union, Poles freed from forced labour in Nazi Germany, with Ukrainians forcibly resettled under "Operation Vistula", and other minorities which settled in post-war Poland, including Greeks and Macedonians.

However, contrary to the official declaration that the former German inhabitants of the Recovered Territories had to be removed quickly to house Poles displaced by the Soviet annexation, the Recovered Territories initially faced a severe population shortage. The Soviet-appointed Polish communist authorities that conducted the resettlement also made efforts to remove many traces of German culture, such as place names or historic inscriptions on buildings.

The post-war border between Germany and Poland (the Oder–Neisse line) was recognized by East Germany in 1950 and by West Germany in 1970, and was affirmed by the re-united Germany in the German–Polish Border Treaty of 1990.

== Origin and use of the term ==
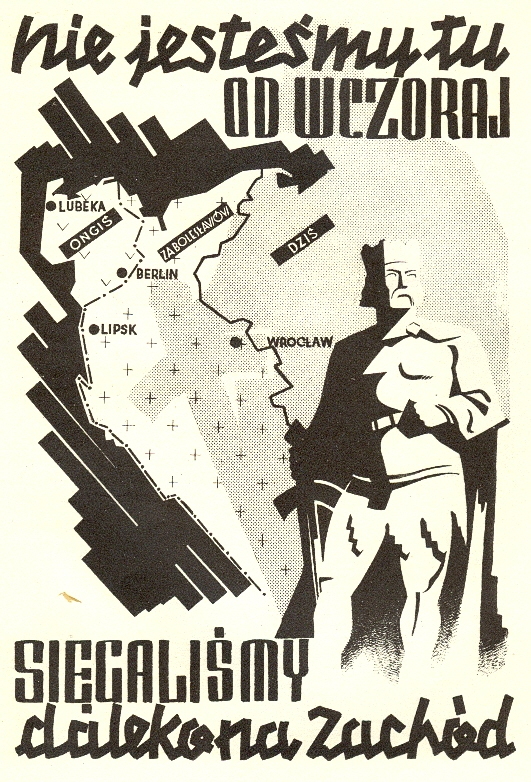
Polish nationalist propaganda from the 1930s: "Nie jestesmy tu od wczoraj. Sięgaliśmy daleko na zachód." (We are not here since yesterday. Once we reached far west.)

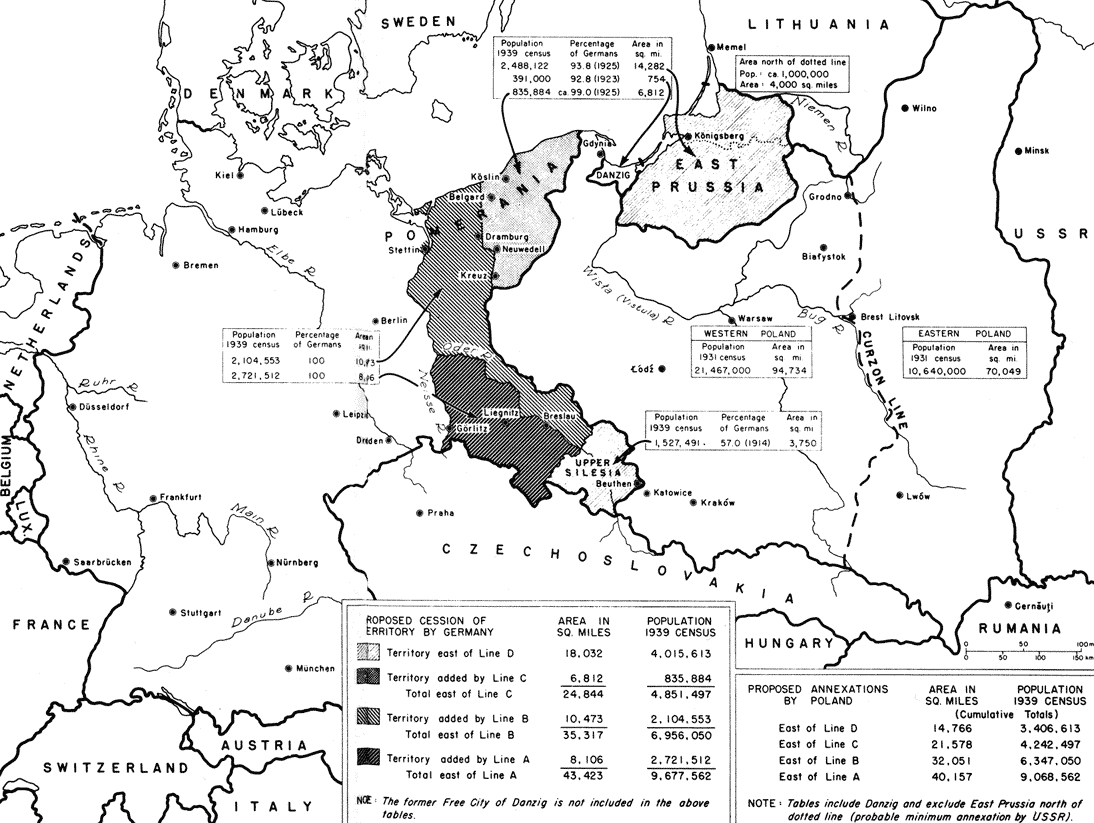
United States Department of State demographics map from 10 January 1945 Germany – Poland Proposed Territorial Changes

The term "Recovered Territories" was officially used for the first time in the Decree of the President of the Republic of 11 October 1938, after the annexation of Trans-Olza by the Polish army. It became the official term coined in the aftermath of World War II to denote the former eastern territories of Germany that were being handed over to Poland, pending a final peace conference with Germany which eventually never took place. The term "Recovered Territories" is a collective term for different areas with different histories, which can be grouped into three categories:

- Those that once had been part of the Polish state during the rule of the Piasts, many of which later on had been part of various Piast, Griffin, Jagiellon and Sobieski-ruled duchies, some up to the 17th and 18th century, although often under foreign suzerainty;
- Those that had been part of Poland until the 17th century (northernmost part of Greater Poland, including Czaplinek) or were under Polish suzerainty as fiefs, in the 15th, 16th and 17th centuries (southern Ducal Prussia and the Duchy of Opole, which also falls into the category above);
- Territories that had been part of Poland until the Partitions (Warmia, Malbork Voivodeship, parts of Pomerelia, northern Greater Poland including Piła, Wałcz, and Złotów, which were annexed by Prussia in the First Partition of 1772; and Gdańsk and western parts of Greater Poland including Międzyrzecz and Wschowa, which followed in the Second Partition of 1793).

The underlying concept was to define post-war Poland as heir to the medieval Piasts' realm, which was simplified into a picture of an ethnically homogeneous state that matched post-war borders, as opposed to the later Jagiellon Poland, which was multi-ethnic and located further east. The argument that this territory in fact constituted "old Polish lands" seized on a pre-war concept developed by Polish right-wing circles attached to the SN. One reason for post-war Poland's favoring a Piast rather than a Jagiellon tradition was Joseph Stalin's refusal to withdraw from the Curzon line and the Allies' readiness to satisfy Poland with German territory instead. The original argument for awarding formerly German territory to Poland – compensation – was complemented by the argument that this territory in fact constituted former areas of Poland. Dmitrow says that "in official justifications for the border shift, the decisive argument that it presented a compensation for the loss of the eastern half of the pre-war Polish territory to the USSR, was viewed as obnoxious and concealed. Instead, a historical argumentation was foregrounded with the dogma, Poland had just returned to "ancient Piast lands". Objections to the Allies' decisions and criticism of the Polish politicians' role at Potsdam were censored. In a commentary for Tribune, George Orwell likened the transfer of the German population to transferring the whole of the Irish and Scottish population. Also, the Piasts were perceived to have defended Poland against the Germans, while the Jagiellons' main rival had been the growing Duchy of Moscow, making them a less suitable basis for post-war Poland's Soviet-dominated situation. The People's Republic of Poland under the Polish Workers' Party thus supported the idea of Poland based on old Piast lands. The question of the Recovered Territories was one of the few issues that did not divide the Polish Communists and their opposition, and there was unanimity regarding the western border. Even the underground anti-Communist press called for the Piast borders, that would end Germanisation and Drang nach Osten. The official view was that the Poles had always had the inalienable and inevitable right to inhabit the Recovered Territories, even if prevented from doing so by foreign powers. Furthermore, the Piast concept was used to persuade the Allied Powers, who found it difficult to define a Polish "ethnographic territory", to assume that it would be an intolerable injustice to not "give the territories back".

By 1949, the term "Recovered Territories" had been dropped from Polish communist propaganda, but it is still used occasionally in common language. On the grounds that those areas should not be regarded as unique territories within the Polish state, the authorities began to refer to them instead as the "Western and Northern Lands". Wolff and Cordell say that along with the debunking of communist historiography, "the "recovered territories" thesis [...] has been discarded", and that "it is freely admitted in some circles that on the whole "the recovered territories" had a wholly German character", but that this view has not necessarily been transmitted to the whole of Polish society. The term was also used outside Poland. In 1962, Pope John XXIII referred to those territories as the "western lands after centuries recovered", and did not revise his statement, even under pressure of the German embassy. The term is still sometimes considered useful, due to the Polish existence in those lands that was still visible in 1945, by some prominent scholars, such as Krzysztof Kwaśniewski.

== History before 1945 ==
Early Piast Poland at the death of Mieszko I in 992, who is considered as the first historical ruler of Poland and the creator of the Polish state, after his realm was recognized by the papacy.

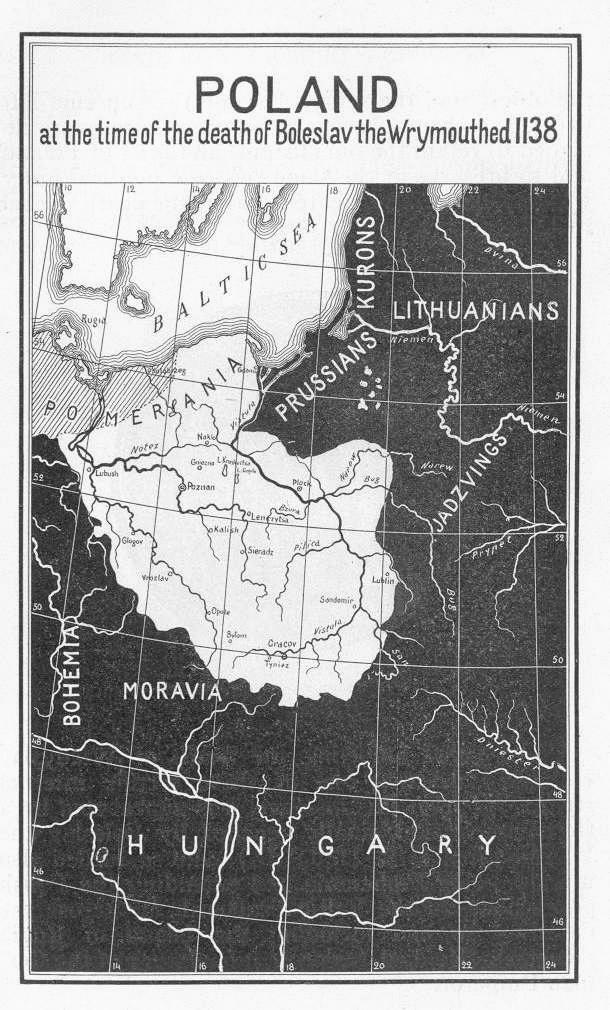
Map (published in 1917 in the United States) showing Poland at the death of Boleslaw III in 1138

Prior to the migration westward of West Slavic tribes to the area of present-day Poland in late 4th Century, the area was home to numerous Germanic Tribes, such as the Gutones in the Vistula Basin, and the Vandals in Silesia, Greater Poland, Mazovia and Lesser Poland. The subsequent assimilation of the remaining, pre-existing population of Germanic, Celtic, and Baltic tribes that inhabited the area, effectively Polonising much of the area for subsequent centuries.

Several different West Slavic tribes inhabited most of the area of present-day Poland from the 6th century. Duke Mieszko I of the Polans, from his stronghold in the Gniezno area, united various neighboring tribes in the second half of the 10th century, forming the first Polish state and becoming the first historically recorded Piast duke. His realm roughly included all of the area of what would later be named the "Recovered Territories", except for the Warmian-Masurian part of Old Prussia and eastern Lusatia.

Mieszko's son and successor, Duke Bolesław I Chrobry, upon the 1018 Peace of Bautzen expanded the southern part of the realm, but lost control over the lands of Western Pomerania on the Baltic coast. After fragmentation, pagan revolts and a Bohemian invasion in the 1030s, Duke Casimir I the Restorer (reigned 1040–1058) again united most of the former Piast realm, including Silesia and Lubusz Land on both sides of the middle Oder River, but without Western Pomerania, which became part of the Polish state again under Bolesław III Wrymouth from 1116 until 1121, when the noble House of Griffins established the Duchy of Pomerania. On Bolesław's death in 1138, Poland for almost 200 years was subjected to fragmentation, being ruled by Bolesław's sons and by their successors, who were often in conflict with each other. Władysław I the Elbow-high, crowned King of Poland in 1320, achieved partial reunification, although the Silesian and Masovian duchies remained independent Piast holdings.

In the course of the 12th to 14th centuries, Germanic, Dutch and Flemish settlers moved into East Central and Eastern Europe in a migration process known as the Ostsiedlung. In Pomerania, Brandenburg, Prussia and Silesia, the indigenous West Slav (Polabian Slavs and Poles) or Balt population became minorities in the course of the following centuries, although substantial numbers of the original inhabitants remained in areas such as Upper Silesia. In Greater Poland and in Eastern Pomerania (Pomerelia), German settlers formed a minority.

Despite the loss of several provinces, medieval lawyers of the Kingdom of Poland created a specific claim to all formerly Polish provinces that were not reunited with the rest of the country in 1320. They built on the theory of the Corona Regni Poloniae, according to which the state (the Crown) and its interests were no longer strictly connected with the person of the monarch. Because of that, no monarch could effectively renounce Crown claims to any of the territories that were historically and/or ethnically Polish. Those claims were reserved for the state (the Crown), which in theory still covered all of the territories that were part of, or dependent on, the Polish Crown upon the death of Bolesław III in 1138.

This concept was also developed to prevent the loss of territory after the death of King Casimir III the Great in 1370, when Louis I of Hungary, who ruled Hungary with absolute power, was crowned King of Poland. In the 14th century Hungary was one of the greatest powers of Central Europe, and its influence reached various Balkan principalities and southern Italy (Naples). Poland, in personal union with Hungary, was the smaller, politically weaker and peripheral country. In the Privilege of Koszyce (1374), King Louis I guaranteed that he would not detach any lands from the Polish Kingdom. The concept was not new, as it was inspired by similar Bohemian (Czech) laws (Corona regni Bohemiae).

Some of the territories (such as Pomerelia and Masovia) reunited with Poland during the 15th and 16th centuries. However, all Polish monarchs until the end of the Polish–Lithuanian Commonwealth in 1795 had to promise to do everything possible to reunite the rest of those territories with the Crown.

Many significant events in Polish history are associated with these territories, including the victorious battles of Cedynia (972), Niemcza (1017), Psie Pole and Głogów (1109), Grunwald (1410), Oliwa (1627), the lost battles of Legnica (1241) and Westerplatte (1939), the life and work of astronomers Nicolaus Copernicus (16th century) and Johannes Hevelius (17th century), the creation of the oldest Polish-language texts and printings (Middle Ages and the Renaissance era), the creation of the standards and patterns of the Polish literary language (Renaissance era), Polish maritime history, the establishment of one of the first Catholic dioceses in Poland in the Middle Ages (in Wrocław and Kołobrzeg), and the Polish Reformation in the Renaissance era.

Significant figures were born or lived in these territories. Astronomer Jan of Głogów and scholar Laurentius Corvinus, who were teachers of Nicolaus Copernicus at the University of Kraków, both hailed from Lower Silesia. Jan Dantyszek (Renaissance poet and diplomat, named the Father of Polish Diplomacy) and Marcin Kromer (Renaissance cartographer, diplomat, historian, music theoretician) were bishops of Warmia. The leading figures of the Polish Enlightenment are connected with these lands: philosopher, geologist, writer, poet, translator, statesman Stanisław Staszic and great patron of arts, writer, linguist, statesman and candidate for the Polish crown Adam Kazimierz Czartoryski were both born in these territories, Ignacy Krasicki (author of the first Polish novel, playwright, nicknamed the Prince of Polish Poets) lived in Warmia in his adulthood, and brothers Józef Andrzej Załuski and Andrzej Stanisław Załuski (founders of the Załuski Library in Warsaw, one of the largest 18th-century book collections in the world) grew up and studied in these territories. Painters Daniel Schultz, Tadeusz Kuntze and Antoni Blank, and composers Grzegorz Gerwazy Gorczycki and Feliks Nowowiejski, were born in these lands.

By the time that Poland regained its independence in 1918, Polish activist Dr. Józef Frejlich was already claiming that the lands situated on the right bank of the Oder river, including inner industrial cities such as Wrocław, and Baltic ports such as Szczecin and Gdańsk, were economic parts of Poland that had to be united with the rest of the "economic territory of Poland" into a united and independent state, as a fundamental condition of the economic revival of Poland after World War I.

After the successful Greater Poland uprising, the cession of Pomerelia to Poland following the Treaty of Versailles and the Silesian Uprisings that allowed Poland to obtain a large portion of Upper Silesia, the territorial claims of the Second Polish Republic were directed towards the rest of partially Polish speaking Upper Silesia and Masuria under German control, as well as the city of Danzig, the Czechoslovak part of Cieszyn Silesia and other bordering areas with significant Polish population. The Polish population of these lands was subject to Germanisation and intensified repressions, especially after the Nazis came to power in Germany in 1933.

Most of long Germanized Lower Silesia, Farther Pomerania and Eastern Prussia remained undisputed. However, in reaction to Hitler's Germany threats to Poland shortly before the outbreak of World War II, Polish nationalists displayed maps of Poland including those ancient Polish territories as well, claiming their intention to recover them.

In the interwar period, the German administration, even before the Nazis took power, conducted a massive campaign of renaming of thousands of placenames, to remove traces of Slavic origin.

=== Pomerania ===
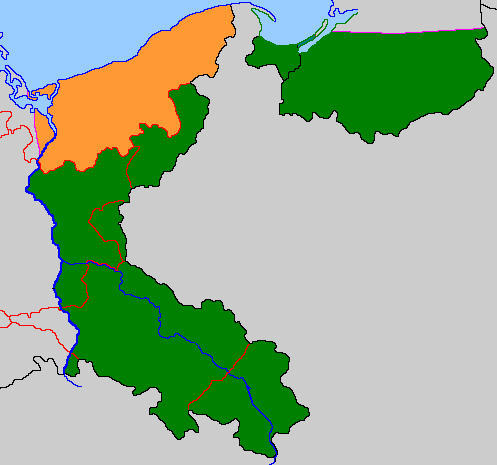
Location of the annexed part (orange) of the Province of Pomerania and of the other "Recovered Territories" (green)

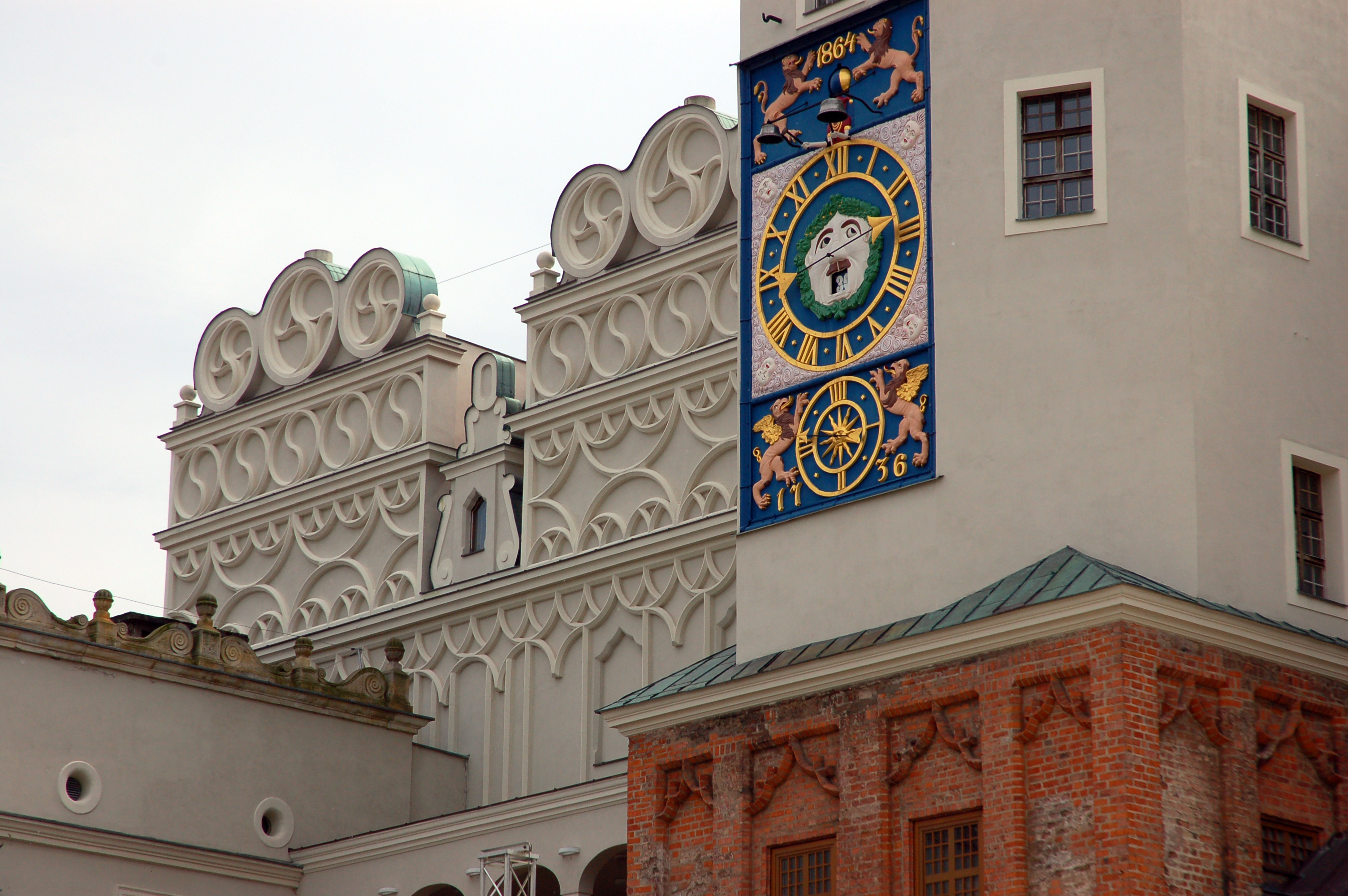
Castle of the Dukes of Pomerania in Szczecin

The Pomeranian (Western Pomeranian) parts of the Recovered Territories came under Polish rule several times from the late 10th century on, when Mieszko I acquired at least significant parts of them. Mieszko's son Bolesław I established a bishopric in the Kołobrzeg area in 1000–1005/1007, before the area was lost again. Despite further attempts by Polish dukes to again control the Pomeranian tribes, this was only partly achieved by Bolesław III in several campaigns lasting from 1116 to 1121. Successful Christian missions ensued in 1124 and 1128; however, by the time of Bolesław's death in 1138, most of West Pomerania (the Griffin-ruled areas) was no longer controlled by Poland. Shortly after, the Griffin Duke of Pomerania, Boguslav I., achieved the integration of Pomerania into the Holy Roman Empire. The easternmost part of later Western Pomerania (including the city of Słupsk) in the 13th century was part of Eastern Pomerania, which was re-integrated with Poland, and later on, in the 14th and 15th centuries formed a duchy, which rulers were vassals of Jagiellon-ruled Poland. Over the following centuries, Western Pomerania was largely Germanized, although a small Slavic Polabian minority remained. Indigenous Slavs and Poles faced discrimination from the arriving Germans, who, on a local level since the 16th century, imposed discriminatory regulations, such as bans on buying goods from Slavs/Poles or prohibiting them from becoming members of craft guilds. The Duchy of Pomerania under the native Griffin dynasty existed for over 500 years, before it was partitioned between Sweden and Brandenburg-Prussia in the 17th century. At the turn of the 20th century there lived about 14,200 persons of Polish mother-tongue in the Province of Pomerania (in the east of Farther Pomerania in the vicinity of the border with the province of West Prussia), and 300 persons using the Kashubian language (at the Łeba Lake and the Lake Gardno), the total population of the province consisting of almost 1.7 million inhabitants. The Polish communities in many cities of the region, such as Szczecin and Kołobrzeg, faced intensified repressions after the Nazis came to power in Germany in 1933.

==== Gdańsk, Lębork and Bytów ====
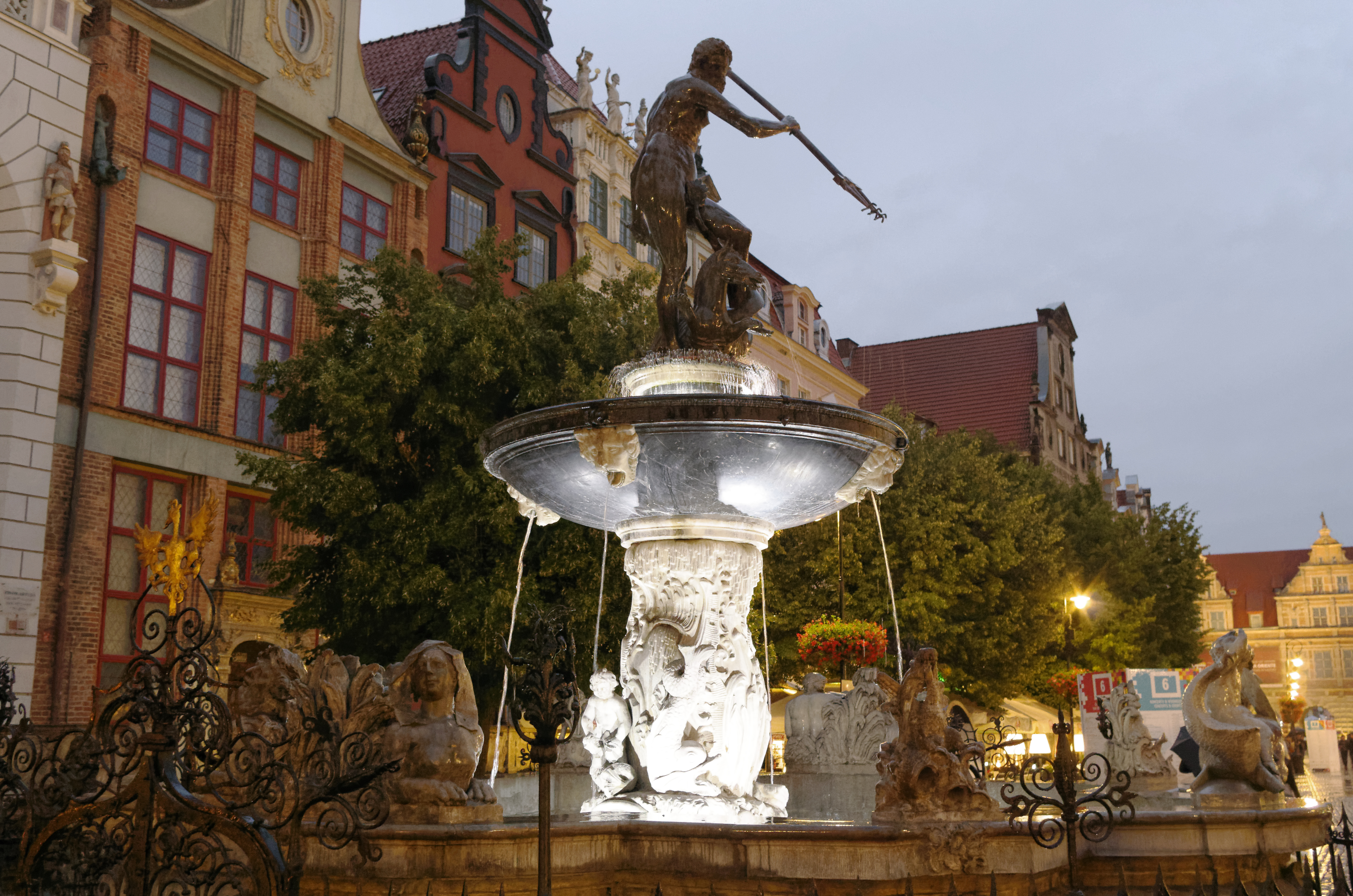
Gdańsk was a principal seaport of Poland since the Middle Ages. From the mid-15th to the early 18th century, it was the largest city in Poland. Lost by Poland in the Second Partition in 1793.

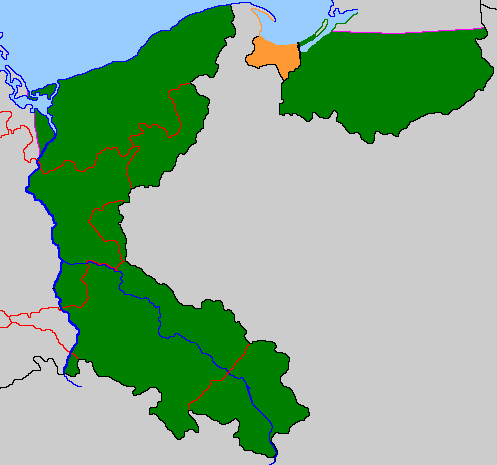
Location of the former Free City of Danzig (orange) and of the other "Recovered Territories" (green)

The region of Pomerelia at the eastern end of Pomerania, including Gdańsk (Danzig), was part of Poland since its first ruler Mieszko I. As a result of the fragmentation of Poland, it was ruled in the 12th and 13th centuries by the Samborides, who were (at least initially) more closely tied to the Kingdom of Poland than were the Griffins. After the Treaty of Kępno in 1282, and the death of the last Samboride in 1294, the region was ruled by kings of Poland for a short period, although also claimed by Brandenburg. After the Teutonic takeover in 1308, the region was annexed to the monastic state of the Teutonic Knights.

Most cities of the region joined or sided with the Prussian Confederation, which in 1454 started an uprising against Teutonic rule and asked the Polish King Casimir IV Jagiellon to incorporate the region into Poland. After the King agreed and signed the act of incorporation, the Thirteen Years' War broke out, ending in a Polish victory. The Second Peace of Thorn (1466) made Royal Prussia a part of Poland. It had a substantial autonomy and a lot of privileges. It formed the Pomeranian Voivodeship, located within the province of Royal Prussia in the Kingdom of Poland, as it remained until being annexed by the Kingdom of Prussia in the partitions of 1772 and 1793. A small area in the west of Pomerelia, the Lauenburg and Bütow Land (the region of Lębork and Bytów) was granted to the rulers of Pomerania as a Polish fief, before being reintegrated with Poland in 1637, and later on, again transformed into a Polish fief, which it remained until the First Partition, when three quarters of Royal Prussia's urban population were German-speaking Protestants. After Poland regained independence in 1918, a large part of Pomerelia was reintegrated with Poland, as the so-called Polish Corridor, and so was not part of the post-war so-called "Recovered Territories".

=== Lubusz Land and parts of Greater Poland ===
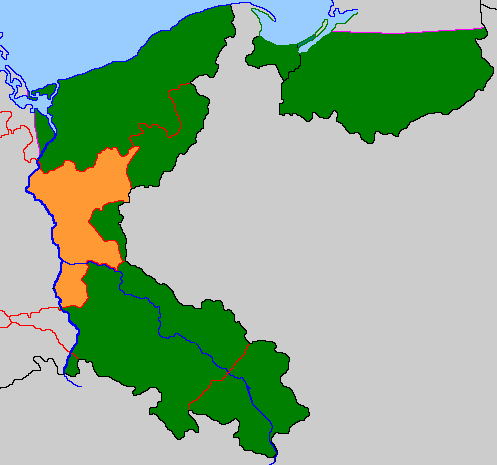
Location of East Brandenburg (orange) and of the other "Recovered Territories" (green)

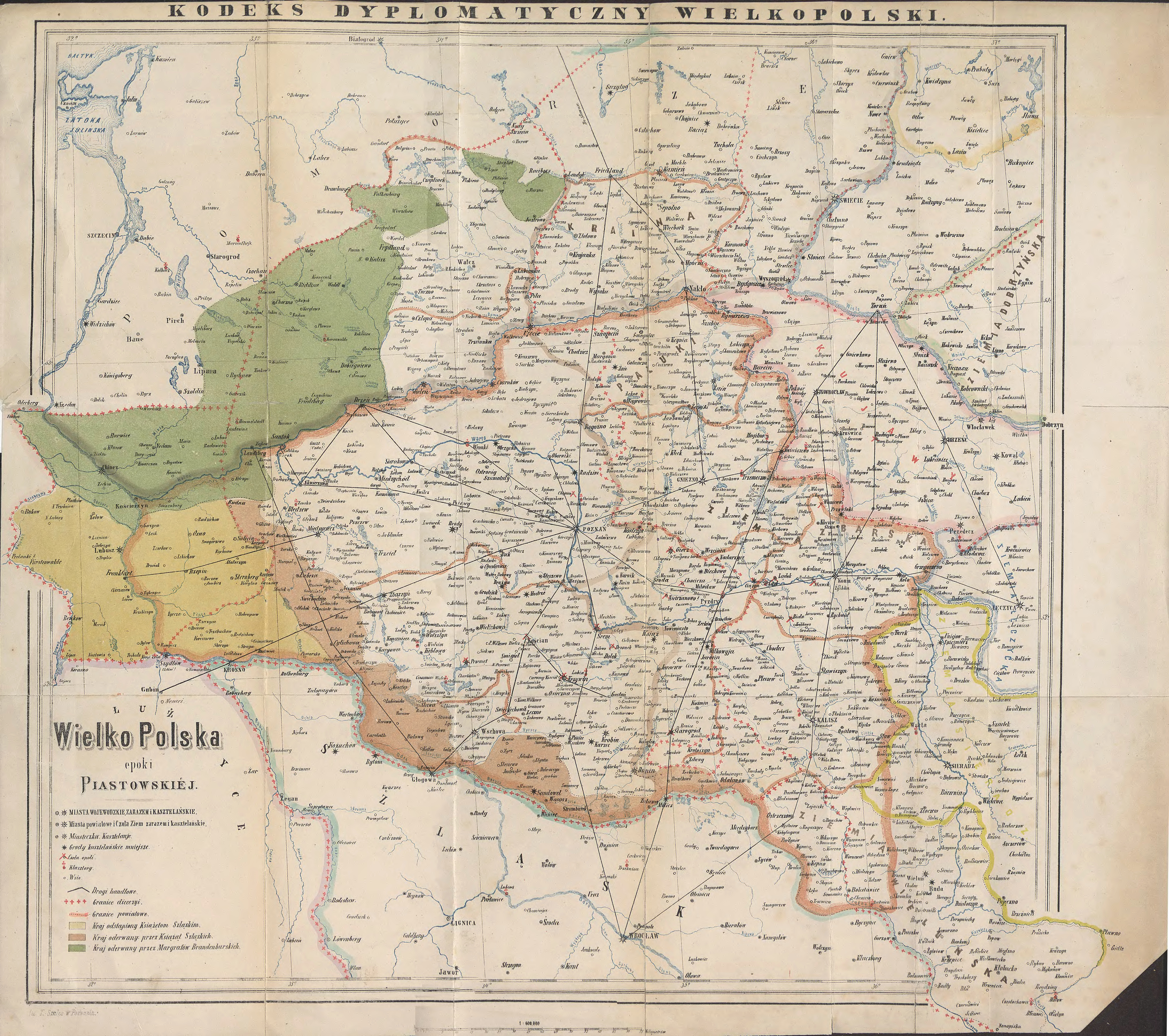
A 19th century map of Piast-ruled Greater Poland: Lubusz Land, stretched on both sides of the Oder, marked in yellow, northwestern parts of Greater Poland annexed by Brandenburg, marked in green

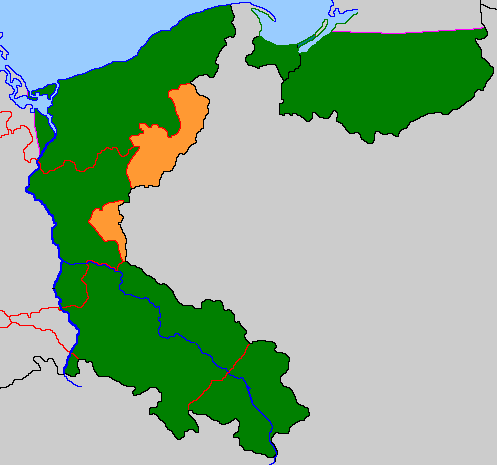
Location of Posen-West Prussia (orange) and of the other "Recovered Territories" (green)

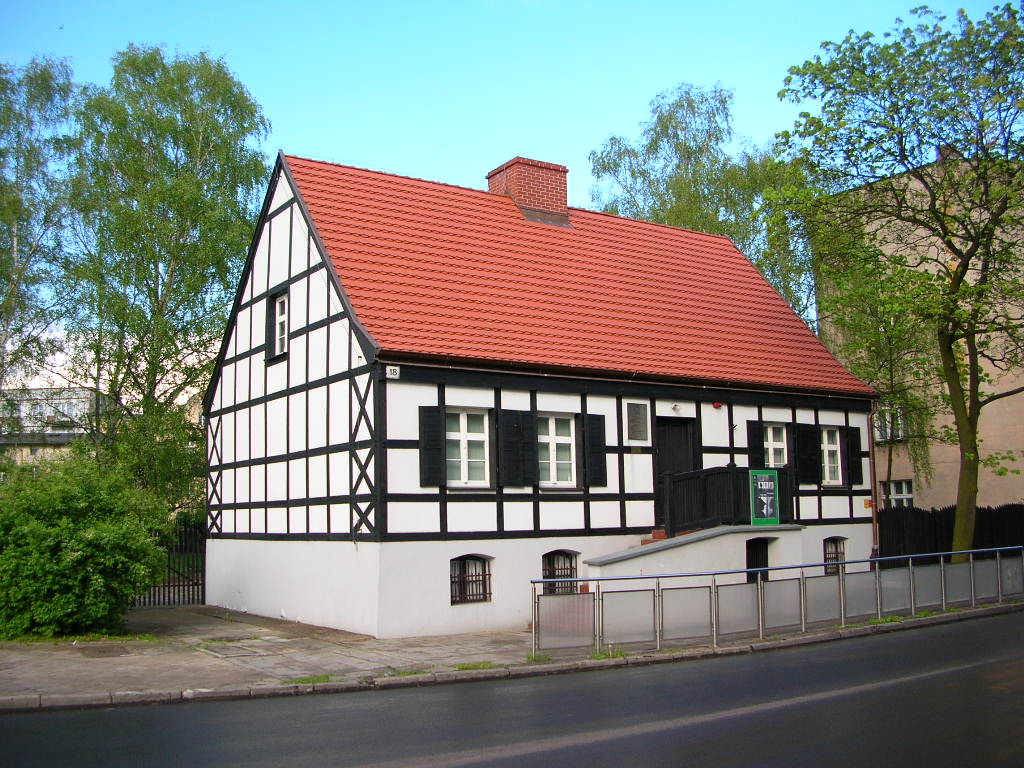
Birthplace of Stanisław Staszic, a leading figure of Polish Enlightenment, in Piła (nowadays a museum)

The medieval Lubusz Land on both sides of the Oder River up to the Spree in the west, including Lubusz (Lebus) itself, also formed part of Mieszko's realm. In the period of fragmentation of Poland, the Lubusz Land was, at different periods, part of the Greater Poland and Silesian provinces of Poland. Poland lost Lubusz when the Silesian duke Bolesław II Rogatka sold it to the Ascanian margraves of Brandenburg in 1249. The Bishopric of Lebus, established by Polish Duke Bolesław III Wrymouth, remained a suffragan of the Archdiocese of Gniezno until 1424, when it passed under the jurisdiction of the Archbishopric of Magdeburg. The Lubusz Land was part of the Lands of the Bohemian (Czech) Crown from 1373 to 1415.

Brandenburg also acquired the castellany of Santok, which formed part of the Duchy of Greater Poland, from Duke Przemysł I of Greater Poland and made it the nucleus of their Neumark ("New March") region. In the following decades, Brandenburg annexed further parts of northwestern Greater Poland. Later on, Santok was briefly recaptured by the Poles several times. Of the other cities, King Casimir III the Great recovered Wałcz in 1368. The lost parts of Greater Poland were part of the Lands of the Bohemian (Czech) Crown from 1373 to 1402, when despite an agreement between the Luxembourg dynasty of Bohemia and the Jagiellons of Poland on the sale of the region to Poland, it was sold to the Teutonic Order. During the Polish–Teutonic War (1431–1435), several towns of the region rebelled against the Order to join Poland, among them Choszczno/Arnswalde, Neuwedell and Falkenburg. The present-day Polish Lubusz Voivodeship comprises most of the former Brandenburgian Neumark territory east of the Oder.

A small part of northern Greater Poland around the town of Czaplinek was lost to Brandenburg-Prussia in 1668. Bigger portions of Greater Poland were lost in the Partitions of Poland: the northern part with Piła and Wałcz in the First Partition and the remainder, including the western part with Międzyrzecz and Wschowa in the Second Partition. During Napoleonic times, the Greater Poland territories formed part of the Duchy of Warsaw, but after the Congress of Vienna, Prussia reclaimed them as part of the Grand Duchy of Posen (Poznań), later Province of Posen. After World War I, those parts of the former Province of Posen and of West Prussia that were not restored as part of the Second Polish Republic were administered as Grenzmark Posen-Westpreußen (the German Province of Posen–West Prussia) until 1939.

=== Silesia ===
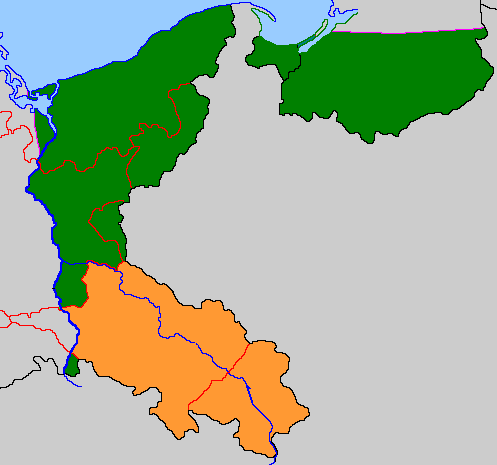
Location of Silesia (orange) in the "Recovered Territories" (green)

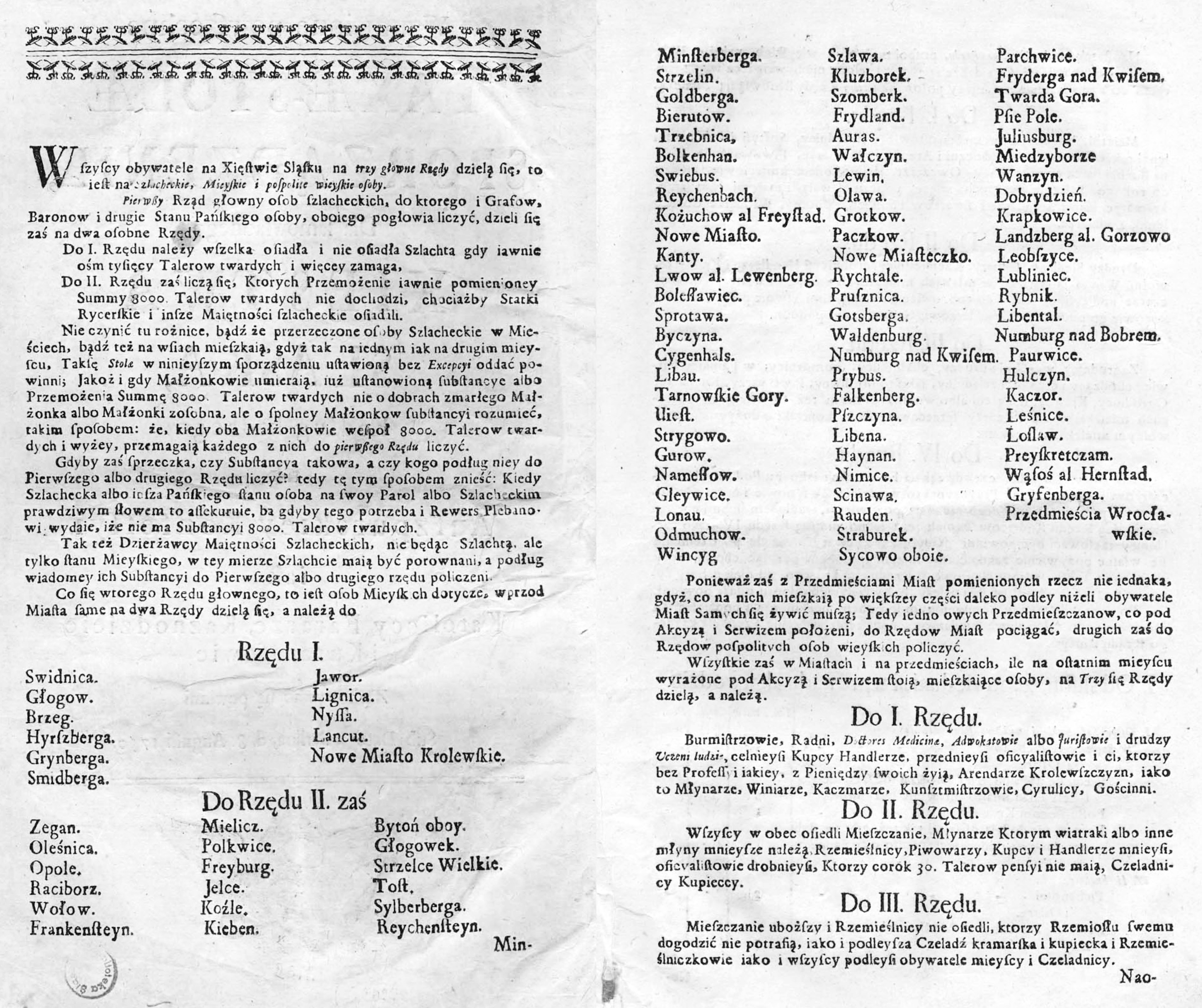
Polish city names in Silesia; from a 1750 Prussian official document published in Berlin during the Silesian Wars.

Lower Silesia was one of the leading regions of medieval Poland. Wrocław was one of three main cities of the Medieval Polish Kingdom, according to the 12th century chronicle Gesta principum Polonorum. Henry I the Bearded granted town rights for the first time in the history of Poland in 1211 to the Lower Silesian town of Złotoryja. The Book of Henryków, containing the oldest known written sentence in Polish, was created in Lower Silesia. The first Polish-language printed text was published in Wrocław by Głogów-born Kasper Elyan, who is regarded as the first Polish printer. Burial sites of Polish monarchs are located in Wrocław, Trzebnica and Legnica.

Piast dukes continued to rule Silesia following the 12th century fragmentation of Poland. The Silesian Piasts retained power in most of the region until the early 16th century, the last (George William, duke of Legnica) dying in 1675. Some Lower Silesian duchies were also under the rule of Polish Jagiellons (Głogów) and Sobieskis (Oława), and part of Upper Silesia, the Duchy of Opole, found itself back under Polish rule in the mid-17th century, when the Habsburgs pawned the duchy to the Polish Vasas. The Roman Catholic Diocese of Wrocław, established in 1000 as one of Poland's oldest dioceses, remained a suffragan of the Archbishopric of Gniezno until 1821.

The first German colonists arrived in the late 12th century, and large-scale German settlement started in the early 13th century during the reign of Henry I (Duke of Silesia from 1201 to 1238). After the era of German colonisation, the Polish language still predominated in Upper Silesia and in parts of Lower and Middle Silesia north of the Odra river. Here, the Germans who arrived during the Middle Ages became mostly Polonised; Germans dominated in large cities and Poles mostly in rural areas. The Polish-speaking territories of Lower and Middle Silesia, commonly described until the end of the 19th century as the Polish side, were mostly Germanized in the 18th and 19th centuries, except for some areas along the northeastern frontier. The province came under the control of Kingdom of Bohemia in the 14th century, itself part of the Holy Roman Empire of the German Nation, and was briefly under Hungarian rule in the 15th century. Silesia passed to the Habsburg monarchy of Austria in 1526, and Prussia's Frederick the Great conquered most of it in 1742. A part of Upper Silesia became part of Poland after World War I and the Silesian Uprisings, but the bulk of Silesia formed part of the post–1945 Recovered Territories.

=== Warmia and Masuria ===
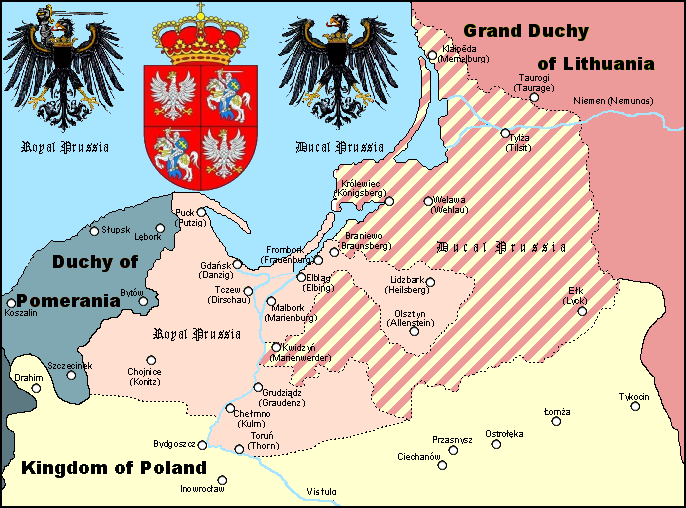
Monastic state of the Teutonic Knights/Ducal Prussia as a feudal fief of the Polish Crown (1466–1657). Warmia was directly incorporated to the Polish state until the First Partition of Poland (1772)

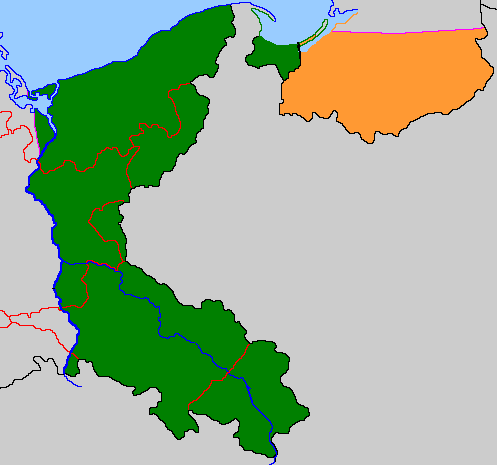
Location of southern East Prussia (orange) and of the other "Recovered Territories" (green)

The territories of Warmia and Masuria were originally inhabited by pagan Old Prussians, until the conquest by the Teutonic Knights in the 13th and 14th centuries. In order to repopulate the conquered areas, Poles from neighboring Masovia, called Masurians (Mazurzy), were allowed to settle here (hence the name Masuria). During an uprising against the Teutonic Order, most towns of the region joined or sided with the Prussian Confederation, at the request of which King Casimir IV Jagiellon signed the act of incorporation of the region into the Kingdom of Poland (1454). After the Second Peace of Thorn (1466) Warmia was confirmed to be incorporated into Poland, while Masuria became part of a Polish fief, first as part of the Teutonic state, and from 1525 as part of the secular Ducal Prussia. Then it would become one of the leading centers of Polish Lutheranism, while Warmia, under the administration of prince-bishops, remained one of the most overwhelmingly Catholic regions of Poland.

Polish suzerainty over Masuria ended in 1657/1660 as a result of the Deluge and Warmia was annexed by the Kingdom of Prussia in the First Partition of Poland (1772). Both regions formed the southern part of the province of East Prussia, established in 1773.

All of Warmia and most of Masuria remained part of Germany after World War I and the re-establishment of independent Poland. During the 1920 East Prussian Plebiscite, the districts east of the Vistula within the region of Marienwerder (Kwidzyn), along with all of the Allenstein Region (Olsztyn) and the district of Oletzko voted to be included within the province of East Prussia and thus became part of Weimar Germany. All of the region, as the southern part of the province of East Prussia, became part of Poland after World War II, with northern East Prussia going to the Soviet Union to form the Kaliningrad Oblast.

== Polish minorities already living in the Recovered Territories ==
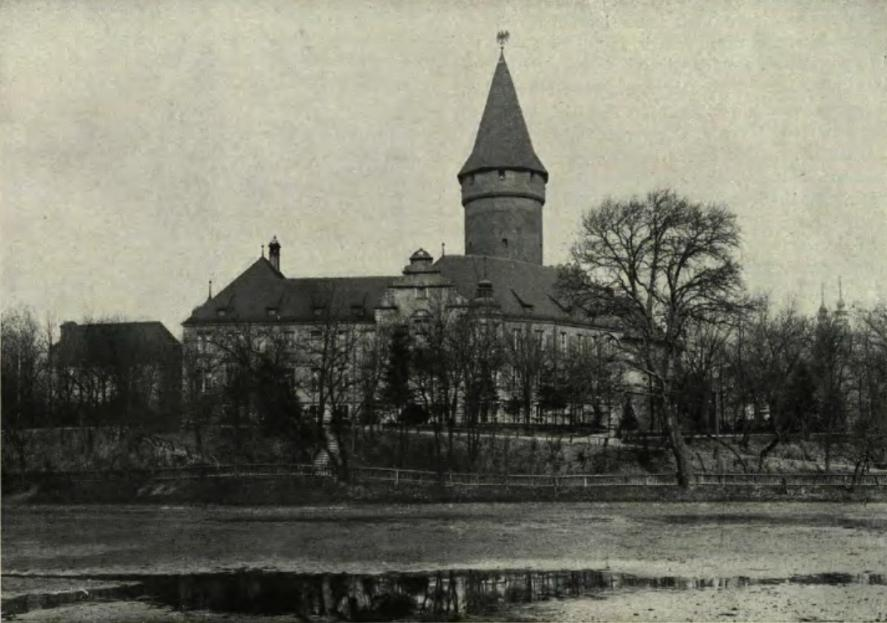
Piast Castle in Opole before its destruction by the local German authorities between 1928 and 1930

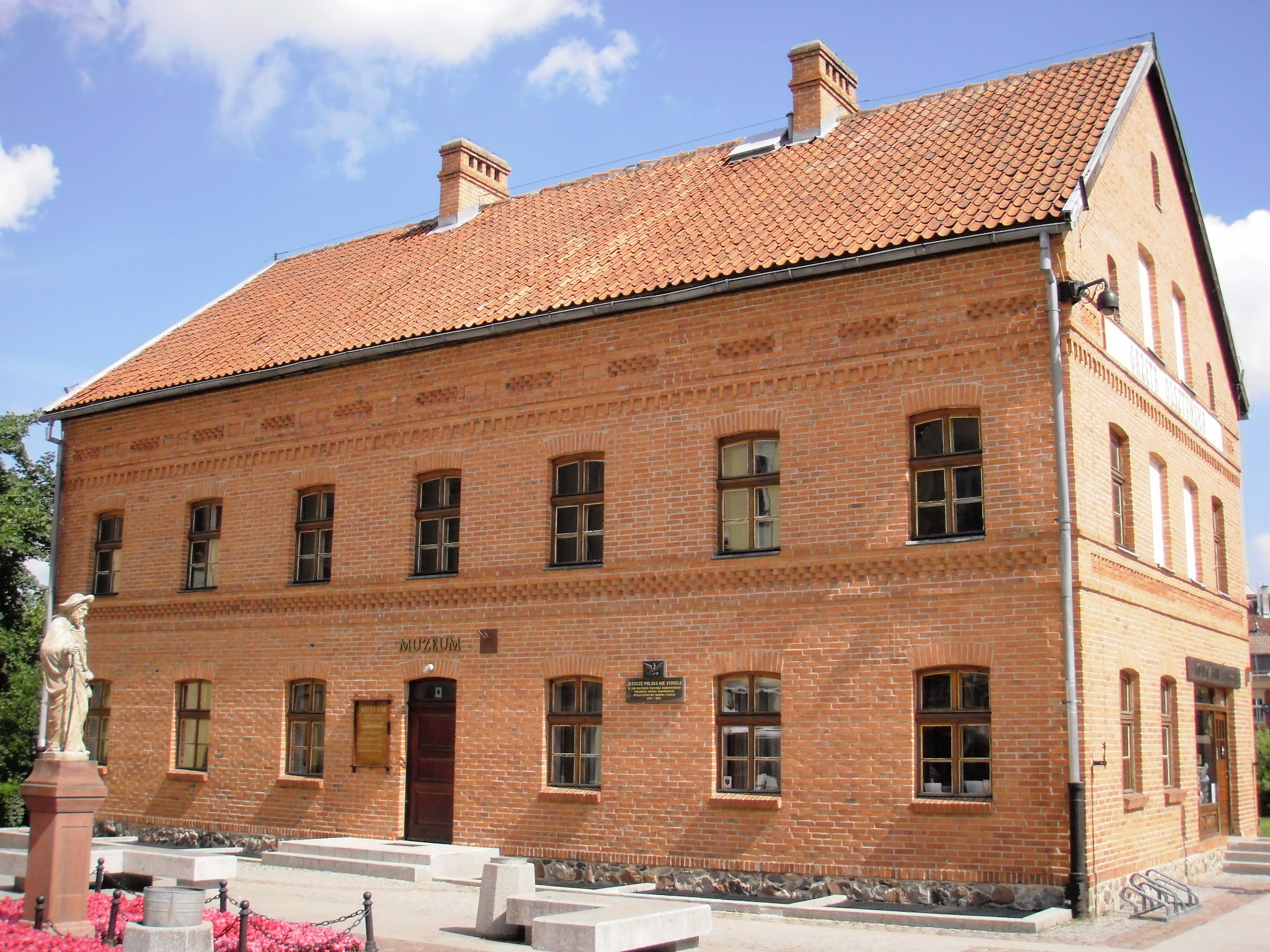
The former headquarters of the pre-war Polish newspaper Gazeta Olsztyńska in Olsztyn, destroyed under Nazi rule in 1939, rebuilt in 1989

Since the time of the Piast dynasty, which unified many of the western Slavic tribes and ruled Poland from the 10th to the 14th centuries, ethnic Poles continued to live in these territories under foreign rule, including Bohemian and German, Hungarian, Austrian, Prussian, this despite the Germanization process (Ostsiedlung), which began in the 13th century with the arrival of German, Dutch and Flemish colonists to Silesia and Pomerania at the behest of the feudal Silesian Piasts and the House of Griffins. Likewise, in the 14th, 15th and 16th century many Polish settlers from Mazovia migrated into the southern portions of the Duchy of Prussia.

Before the outbreak of war, regions of Masuria, Warmia and Upper Silesia still contained significant ethnic Polish populations, and in many areas the Poles constituted a majority of the inhabitants. According to the 1939 Nazi German census, the territories were inhabited by 8,855,000 people, including a Polish minority in the territories' easternmost parts. However these data, concerning ethnic minorities, that came from the census conducted during the reign of the NSDAP (Nazi Party) is usually not considered by historians and demographers as trustworthy but as drastically falsified. Therefore, while this German census placed the number of Polish-speakers and bilinguals below 700,000 people, Polish demographers have estimated that the actual number of Poles in the former German East was between 1.2 and 1.3 million. In the 1.2 million figure, approximately 850,000 were estimated for the Upper Silesian regions, 350,000 for southern East Prussia and 50,000 for the rest of the territories.

Under German rule, these communities faced discrimination and oppression. In 1924, an association of national minorities was founded in Germany, also representing the Polish minority. Jan Baczewski from Warmia, member of the Landtag of Prussia, initiated a law allowing the founding of schools for national minorities. In 1938, the Nazi government changed thousands of place-names (especially of cities and villages) of Polish origin to newly invented German place-names; about 50% of the existing names were changed in that year alone. Also, undercover operatives were sent to spy on Polish communities. Information was gathered on who sent their children to Polish schools, or bought Polish books and newspapers. Polish schools, printing presses, headquarters of Polish institutions, as well as private homes and shops owned by Poles were routinely attacked by members of the Schutzstaffel (SS). Thousands of Poles migrated to these lands during World War II, many of them against their will.

Also, small isolated enclaves of ethnic Poles could be found in Pomerania, Lubusz Land and Lower Silesia. These included scattered villages which remained ethnically Polish and large cities such as Wrocław (Breslau), Szczecin (Stettin) and Zielona Góra (Grünberg in Schlesien), which contained small Polish communities.

== Origin of the post-war population according to 1950 census ==
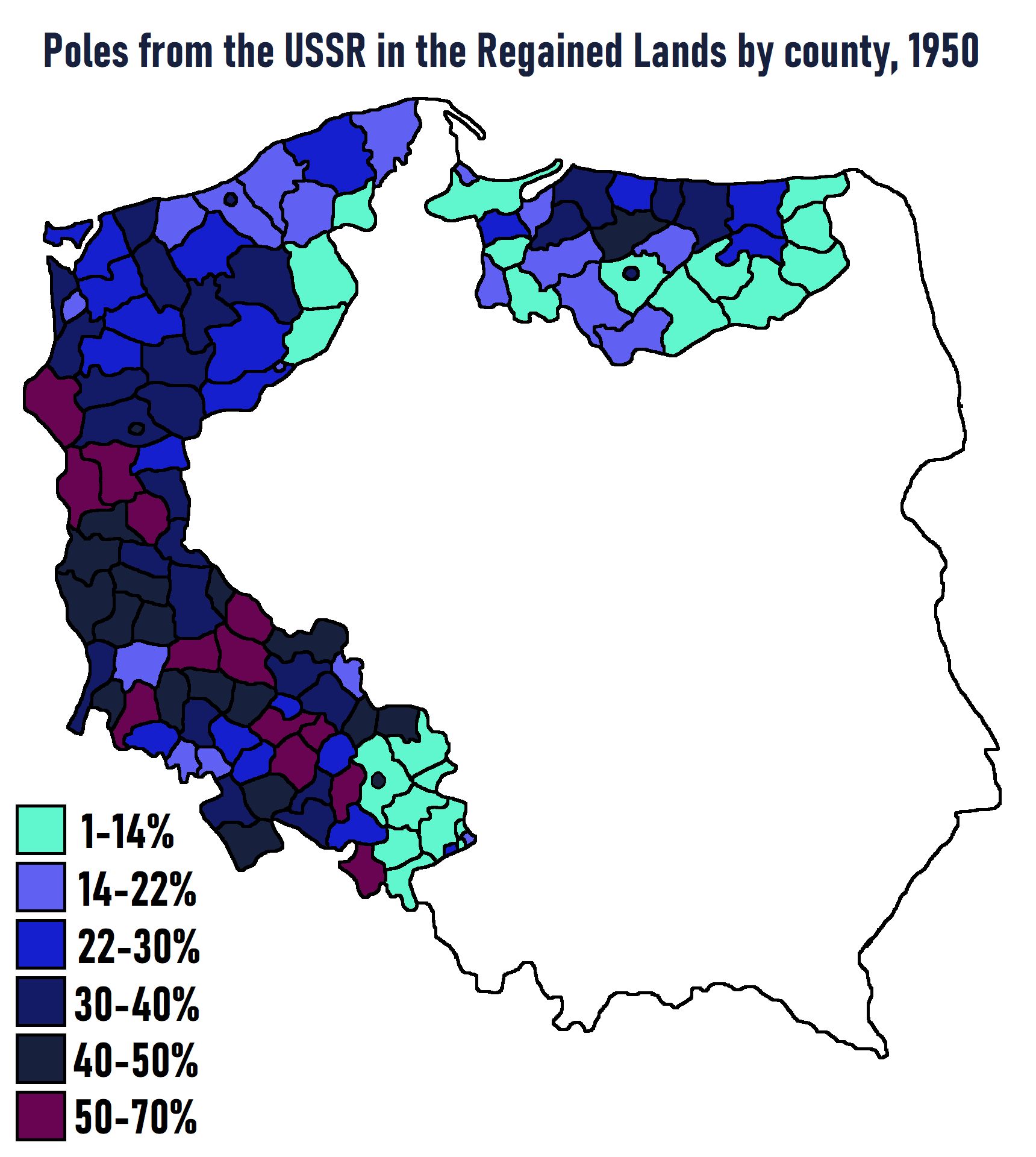
Share of Poles from Kresy in the Recovered Territories by county.

During the Polish post-war census of December 1950, data about the pre-war places of residence of the inhabitants as of August 1939 was collected. (In the case of children born between September 1939 and December 1950, their place of residence was reported based on the pre-war places of residence of their mothers.) Thanks to this data it is possible to reconstruct the pre-war geographical origin of the post-war population. Many areas located near the pre-war German border were resettled by people from neighbouring borderland areas of pre-war Poland. For example, Kashubians from the pre-war Polish Corridor settled in nearby areas of German Pomerania adjacent to Polish Pomerania. People from the Poznań region of pre-war Poland settled in East Brandenburg. People from East Upper Silesia moved into the rest of Silesia. And people from Masovia and the Suwałki Region moved into adjacent Masuria. Poles expelled from former Polish territories in the east (today mainly parts of Ukraine, Belarus and Lithuania) settled in large numbers everywhere in the Recovered Territories (but many of them also settled in central Poland).

Origin of settlers and the number of autochthons in the Recovered Territories in 1950 (county data grouped based on pre-1939 administrative borders)
Region (within 1939 borders):	West Upper Silesia	Lower Silesia	East Brandenburg	West Pomerania	Free City Danzig	South East Prussia	Total
Autochthons (1939 German/Danzig citizens)	789,716	120,885	14,809	70,209	35,311	134,702	1,165,632
Polish expellees from Kresy (USSR)	232,785	696,739	187,298	250,091	55,599	172,480	1,594,992
Poles from abroad except the USSR	24,772	91,395	10,943	18,607	2,213	5,734	153,664
Resettlers from the City of Warsaw	11,333	61,862	8,600	37,285	19,322	22,418	160,820
From Warsaw region (Masovia)	7,019	69,120	16,926	73,936	22,574	158,953	348,528
From Białystok region and Sudovia	2,229	23,515	3,772	16,081	7,638	102,634	155,869
From pre-war Polish Pomerania	5,444	54,664	19,191	145,854	72,847	83,921	381,921
Resettlers from Poznań region	8,936	172,163	88,427	81,215	10,371	7,371	368,483
Katowice region (East Upper Silesia)	91,011	66,362	4,725	11,869	2,982	2,536	179,485
Resettlers from the City of Łódź	1,250	16,483	2,377	8,344	2,850	1,666	32,970
Resettlers from Łódź region	13,046	96,185	22,954	76,128	7,465	6,919	222,697
Resettlers from Kielce region	16,707	141,748	14,203	78,340	16,252	20,878	288,128
Resettlers from Lublin region	7,600	70,622	19,250	81,167	19,002	60,313	257,954
Resettlers from Kraków region	60,987	156,920	12,587	18,237	5,278	5,515	259,524
Resettlers from Rzeszów region	23,577	110,188	13,147	57,965	6,200	47,626	258,703
place of residence in 1939 unknown	36,834	26,486	5,720	17,891	6,559	13,629	107,119
Total pop. in December 1950	1,333,246	1,975,337	444,929	1,043,219	292,463	847,295	5,936,489

== Polonization of the Recovered Territories ==
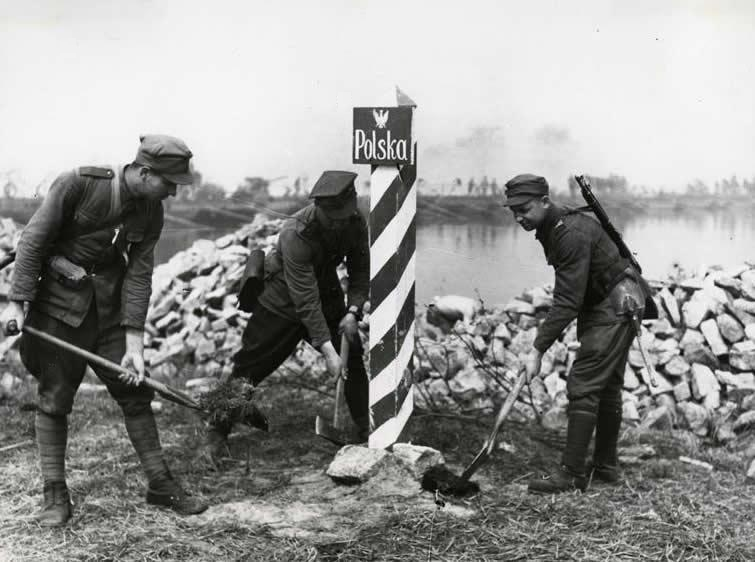
Polish soldiers marking the new Polish-German border in 1945

The People's Republic had to locate its population inside the new frontiers in order to solidify the hold over the territories. With the Kresy annexed by the Soviet Union, Poland was effectively moved westwards and its area reduced by almost 20% (from 389,000 to 312,000 km^{2} (150,194 to 120,464 sq mi)). Millions of non-Poles – mainly Germans from the Recovered Territories, as well as some Ukrainians in the east – were to be expelled from the new Poland, while large numbers of Poles needed to be resettled having been expelled from the Kresy. The expellees were termed "repatriates". The result was the largest exchange of population in European history.

The picture of the new western and northern territories being recovered Piast territory was used to forge Polish settlers and "repatriates" arriving there into a coherent community loyal to the new regime, and to justify the removal of the German inhabitants. Largely excepted from the expulsions of Germans were the "autochthons", close to three million ethnically Polish/Slavic inhabitants of Masuria (Masurs), Pomerania (Kashubians, Slovincians) and Upper Silesia (Silesians). The Polish government aimed to retain as many autochthons as possible, as their presence on former German territory was used to indicate the intrinsic "Polishness" of the area and justify its incorporation into the Polish state as "recovered" territories. "Verification" and "national rehabilitation" processes were set up to reveal a "dormant Polishness" and determine who was redeemable as a Polish citizen. Few were actually expelled. The "autochthons" not only disliked the subjective and often arbitrary verification process, but they also faced discrimination even after completing it, such as the Polonization of their names. In the Lubusz region (former East Brandenburg), the local authorities conceded already in 1948 that what the PZZ claimed to be a recovered "autochton" Polish population were in fact Germanized migrant workers, who had settled in the region in the late 19th and early 20th centuries – with the exception of one village, Babimost, just across the pre-war border.

Great efforts were made to propagate the view of the Piast Concept. It was actively supported by the Catholic Church. The sciences were responsible for the development of this perception of history. In 1945 the Western Institute (Polish: Instytut Zachodni) was founded to coordinate the scientific activities. Its director, Zygmunt Wojciechowski, characterized his mission as an effort to present the Polish history of the region, and project current Polish reality of these countries upon a historical background. Historical scientists, archaeologists, linguists, art historians and ethnologists worked in an interdisciplinary effort to legitimize the new borders. Their findings were popularised in monographs, periodicals, schoolbooks, travel guides, broadcasts and exhibitions. Official maps were drawn showing that the Polish frontiers under the first known Piast princes matched the new ones. According to Norman Davies, the young post-war generation received education informing them that the boundaries of the People's Republic were the same as those on which the Polish nation had developed for centuries. Furthermore, they were instructed that the Polish "Motherland" has always been in the same location, even when "occupied" for long periods of time by foreigners or as political boundaries shifted. Because the Recovered Territories had been under German and Prussian rule for many centuries, many events of this history were perceived as part of "foreign" rather than "local" history in post-war Poland. Polish scholars thus concentrated on the Polish aspects of the territories: medieval Piast history of the region, the cultural, political and economic bonds to Poland, the history of the Polish-speaking population in Prussia and the "Drang nach Osten" as a historical constant since the Middle Ages.

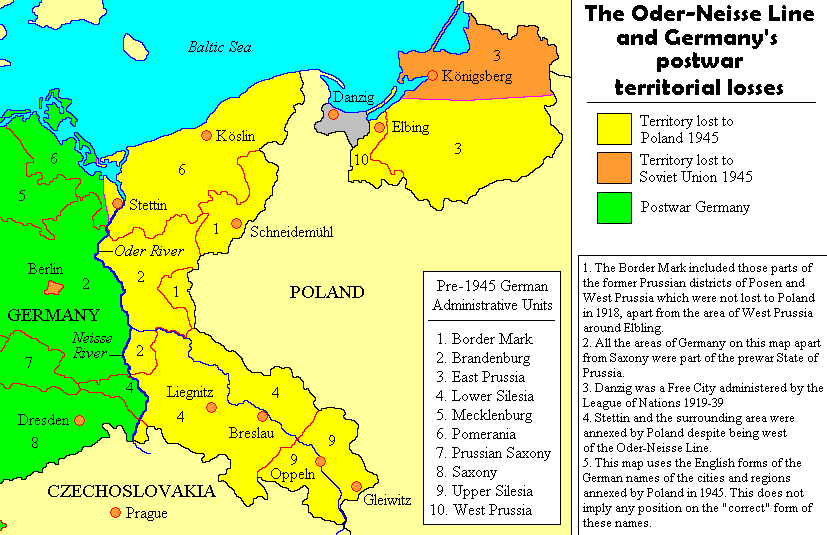
Pre-1945 administrative division (yellow)

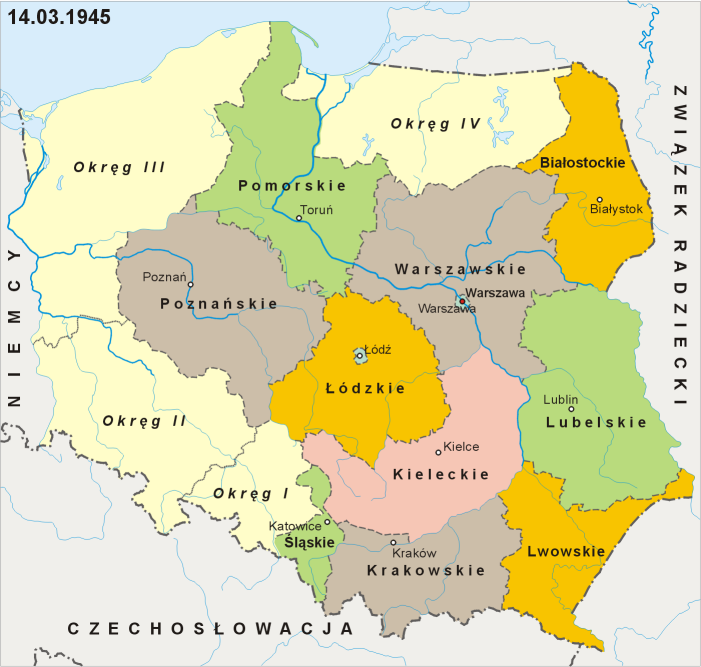
Projected Polish administration (Okreg I-IV) in March, 1945

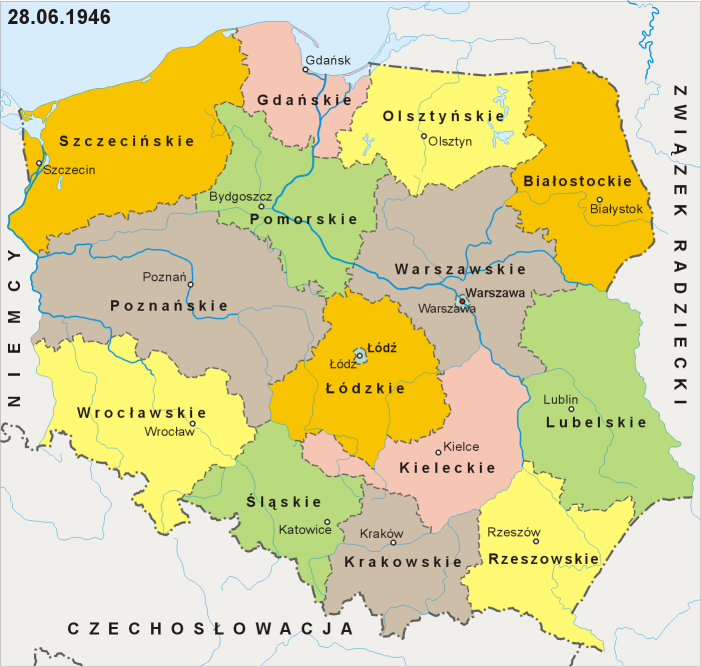
Integration into the Voivodeships of Poland as of June, 1946

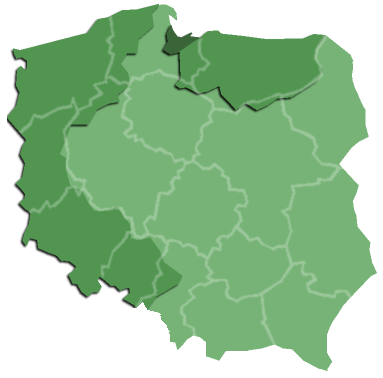
Present-day administrative division of Poland, Western and Northern Lands in dark green

=== Removal of Germans and traces of German habitation ===
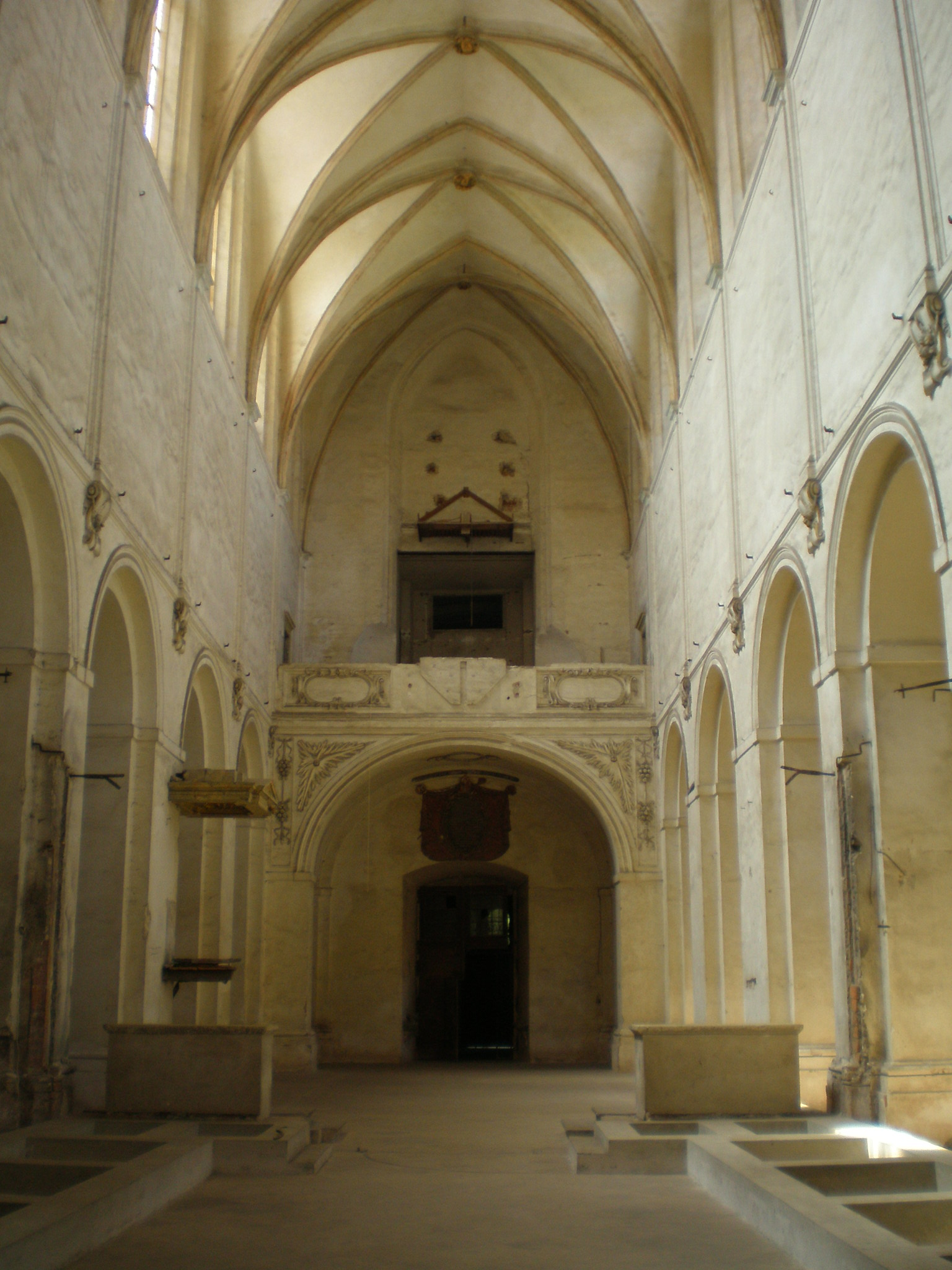
The baroque interior of the Lubiąż abbey was removed and transferred to Stężyca, in eastern Poland in order to replace church stalls destroyed by the Germans.

Map showing German territorial losses of 1945. Recovered Territories and areas annexed by the Soviets are in green.

The Communist authorities of the Polish People's Republic and some Polish citizens desired to erase all traces of German rule. The "Recovered Territories" after the transfer still contained a substantial German population. The Polish administration set up a "Ministry for the Recovered Territories", headed by the then deputy prime minister Władysław Gomułka. A "Bureau for Repatriation" was to supervise and organize the expulsions and resettlements. According to the national census of 14 February 1946, the population of Poland still included 2,288,300 Germans, of which 2,036,439—nearly 89 per cent—lived in the Recovered Territories. By this stage Germans still constituted more than 42 per cent of the inhabitants of these regions, since their total population according to the 1946 census was 4,822,075. However, by 1950 there were only 200,000 Germans remaining in Poland, and by 1957 that number fell to 65,000. While the estimates of how many Germans remained vary, a constant German exodus took place even after the expulsions. Between 1956 and 1985, 407,000 people from Silesia and about 100,000 from Warmia-Masuria declared German nationality and left for West Germany. In the early 1990s, after the Polish Communist regime had collapsed 300,000-350,000 people declared themselves German.

The flight and expulsion of the remaining Germans in the first post-war years presaged a broader campaign to remove signs of former German rule.

More than 30,000 German placenames were replaced with Polish or Polonized medieval Slavic ones. Previous Slavic and Polish names used before German settlements had been established; in the cases when one was absent either the German name was translated or new names were invented. In January 1946, a Committee for Settling of Place Names was set up to assign new official toponyms. The German language was banned from public schools, government media and church services. Many German monuments, graveyards, buildings or entire ensembles of buildings were demolished. Objects of art were moved to other parts of the country. German inscriptions were erased, including those on religious objects, in churches and in cemeteries. In Ziemia Lubuska "Socialist competitions" were organized to search and destroy final German traces.

Historian John Kulczycki argues that the Communist authorities discovered that forging an ethnically homogeneous Poland in the Recovered Territories was quite complicated, for it was difficult to differentiate German speakers who were "really" Polish and those who were not. The government used criteria that involved explicit links to Polish ethnicity, as well the person's conduct. Local verification commissions had wide latitude in determining who was or was not Polish and should remain. Their decisions were based on the nationalist assumption that an individual's national identity is a lifetime "ascriptive" characteristic acquired at birth and not easily changed. However people who "betrayed" their Polish heritage by their political words or actions were excluded from the Polish nation. Everyone else was labelled as "Polish" and had to remain in their "native" land – even if they wanted to emigrate to Germany.

=== Resettlement of the Territories ===
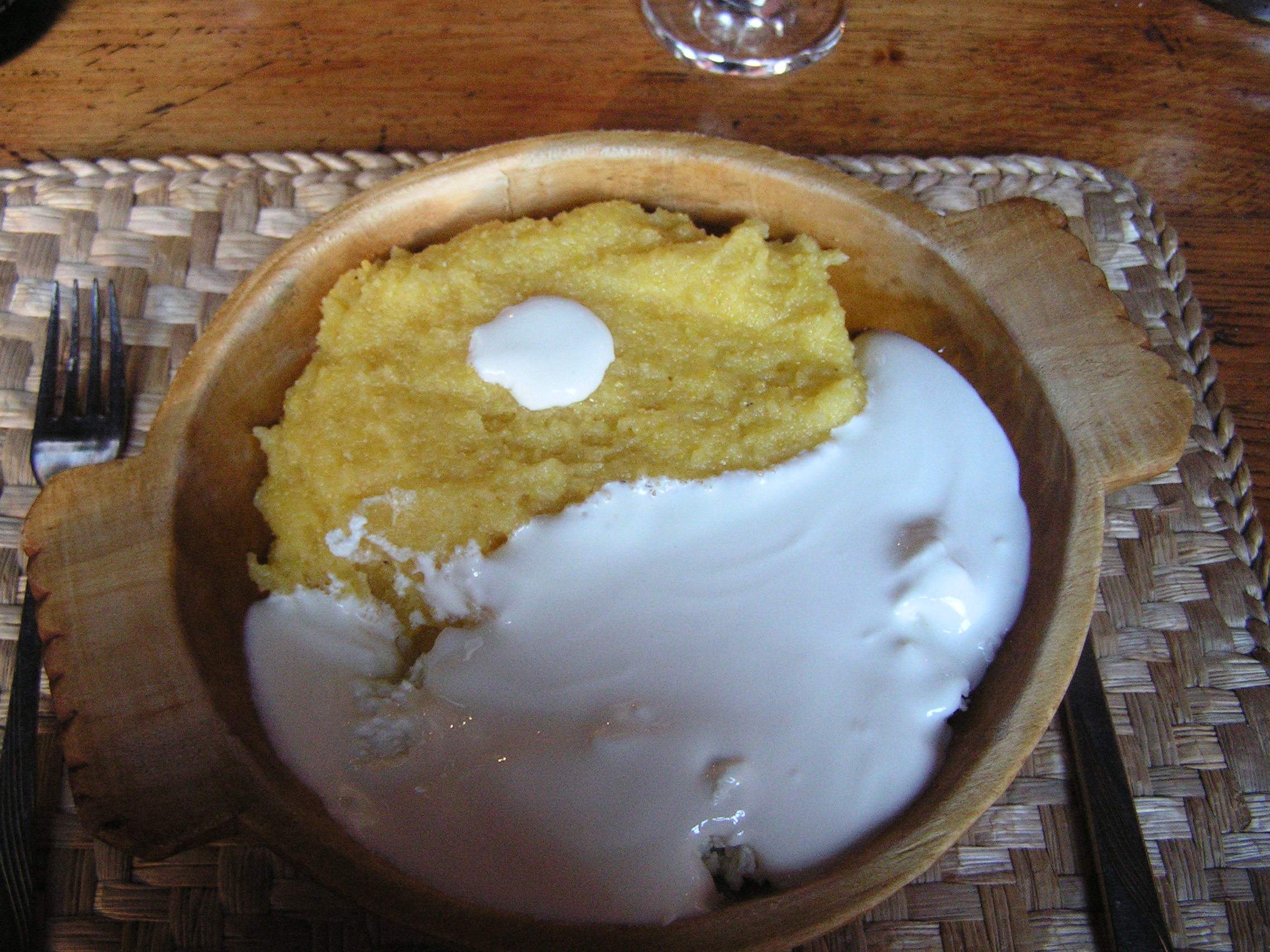
Mămăligă is a dish which was very popular with Poles in East Galicia. People from these areas who resettled in the Recovered Territories brought this and other culinary traditions with them to their new homes.

People from all over Poland quickly moved in to replace the former German population in a process parallel to the expulsions, with the first settlers arriving in March 1945. These settlers took over farms and villages close to the pre-war frontier while the Red Army was still advancing. In addition to the settlers, other Poles went for "szaber" or looting expeditions, soon affecting all former eastern territories of Germany. On 30 March 1945, the Gdańsk Voivodeship was established as the first administrative Polish unit in the "recovered" territories. While the Germans were interned and expelled, close to 5 million settlers were either attracted or forced to settle the areas between 1945 and 1950. An additional 1,104,000 people had declared Polish nationality and were allowed to stay (851,000 of those in Upper Silesia), bringing up the number of Poles to 5,894,600 as of 1950. The settlers can be grouped according to their background:

- settlers from Central Poland moving voluntarily (the majority)
- Poles that had been freed from forced labor in Nazi Germany (up to two million)
- so-called "repatriants": Poles expelled from the areas east of the new Polish-Soviet border were preferably settled in the new western territories, where they made up 26% of the population (up to two million)
- non-Poles forcibly resettled during the Operation Vistula in 1947. Large numbers of Ukrainians were forced to move from south-eastern Poland under a 1947 Polish government operation aimed at dispersing, and therefore assimilating, those Ukrainians who had not been expelled eastward already, throughout the newly acquired territories. Belarusians living around the area around Białystok were also pressured into relocating to the formerly German areas for the same reasons. This scattering of members of non-Polish ethnic groups throughout the country was an attempt by the Polish authorities to dissolve the unique ethnic identity of groups like the Ukrainians, Belarusians and Lemkos, and broke the proximity and communication necessary for strong communities to form.
- Tens of thousands of Jewish Holocaust-survivors, most of them "repatriates" from the East, settled mostly in Lower Silesia, creating Jewish cooperatives and institutions – the largest communities were founded in Wrocław (Breslau, Lower Silesia), Szczecin (Stettin, Pomerania) and Wałbrzych (Waldenburg, Lower Silesia). However most of them left Poland in 1968 due to the Polish 1968 political crisis.
- Greeks and Macedonians, refugees of the Greek Civil War (around 10,000 people)

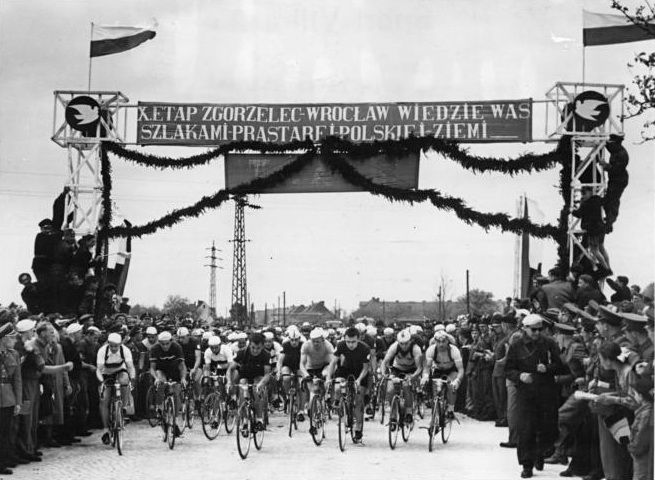
"The 10th stage, Zgorzelec to Wrocław, leads you through primeval Polish lands." Photograph from the June 1955 Peace Race

Polish and Soviet newspapers and officials encouraged Poles to relocate to the west – "the land of opportunity". These new territories were described as a place where opulent villas abandoned by fleeing Germans waited for the brave; fully furnished houses and businesses were available for the taking. In fact, the areas were devastated by the war, the infrastructure largely destroyed, suffering high crime rates and looting by gangs. It took years for civil order to be established.

In 1970, the Polish population of the Northern and Western territories for the first time caught up to the pre-war population level (8,711,900 in 1970 vs 8,855,000 in 1939). In the same year, the population of the other Polish areas also reached its pre-war level (23,930,100 in 1970 vs 23,483,000 in 1939).

Today the population of the territories is predominantly Polish, although a small German minority still exists in a few places, including Olsztyn, Masuria, and Upper Silesia, particularly in Opole Voivodeship (the area of Opole, Strzelce Opolskie, Prudnik, Kędzierzyn-Koźle and Krapkowice).

== Role of the Recovered Territories in the Communists' rise to power ==
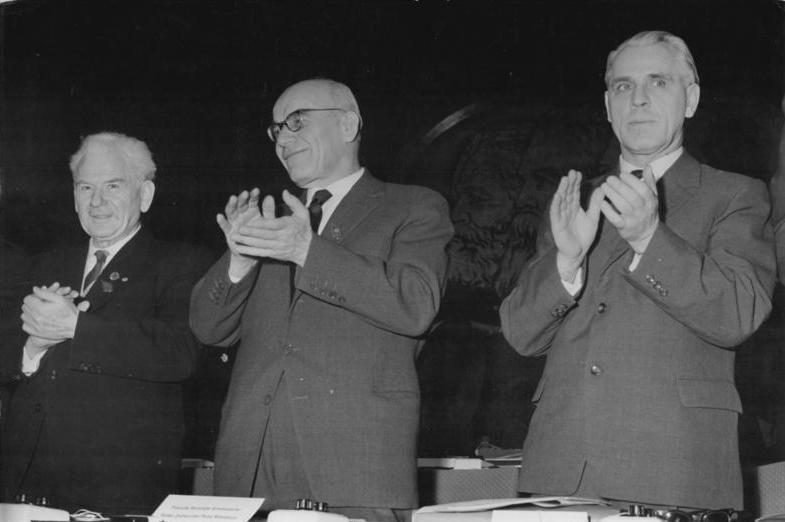
Władysław Gomułka (center), minister in the Polish People's Republic who oversaw the integration and development of the Recovered Territories between 1945 and 1948

The Communist government, not democratically legitimized, sought to legitimize itself through anti-German propaganda. The German "revanchism" was played up as a permanent German threat, with the Communists being the only guarantors and defenders of Poland's continued possession of the "Recovered Territories". Gomułka asserted that:

The western territories are one of the reasons the government has the support of the people. This neutralizes various elements and brings people together. Westward expansion and agricultural reform will bind the nation with the state. Any retreat would weaken our domestic position.

The redistribution of "ownerless property" among the people by the regime brought it broad-based popular sympathy.

After the Second World War, the Soviet Union annexed the Polish territory of the Kresy—located east of the Curzon line—and encouraged or forced ethnic minorities in these parts of Poland, including ethnic Poles, to move west. In the framework of the campaign, Soviets exhibited posters in public places with messages such as,

Western territories. Eldorado. In bloody battles, the Polish soldier has liberated very old Polish territories. Polish territory for Poland. 5,000 lorries are available to bring settlers to the west.

== Legal status of the territories ==
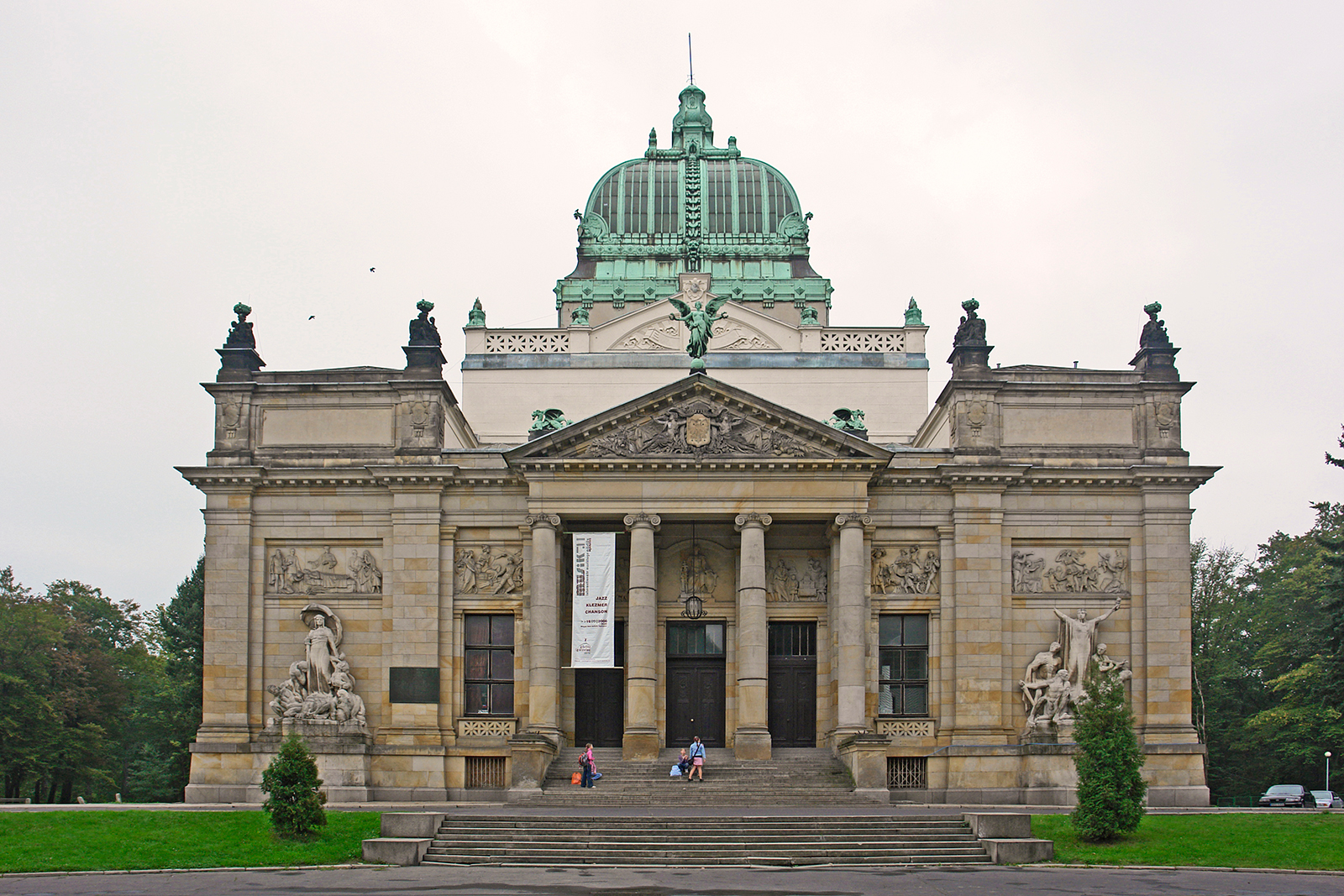
Municipal House of Culture in Zgorzelec, place of signing of the Treaty of Zgorzelec in 1950

During the Cold War the official position in the First World was that the concluding document of the Potsdam Conference was not an international treaty, but a mere memorandum. It regulated the issue of the German eastern border, which was to be the Oder-Neisse line, but the final article of the memorandum said that the final status of the German state and therefore its territories were subject to a separate peace treaty between Germany and the Allies of World War II. During the period from 1945 to 1990 two treaties between Poland and both East and West Germany were signed concerning the German-Polish border. In 1950, the German Democratic Republic and the People's Republic of Poland signed the Treaty of Zgorzelec, recognizing the Oder-Neisse line, officially designated by the Communists as the "Border of Peace and Friendship". On 7 December 1970, the Treaty of Warsaw between the Federal Republic of Germany and Poland was signed concerning the Polish western border. Both sides committed themselves to nonviolence and accepted the existing de facto border—the Oder-Neisse line. However a final treaty was not signed until 1990 as the "Treaty on the Final Settlement With Respect to Germany".

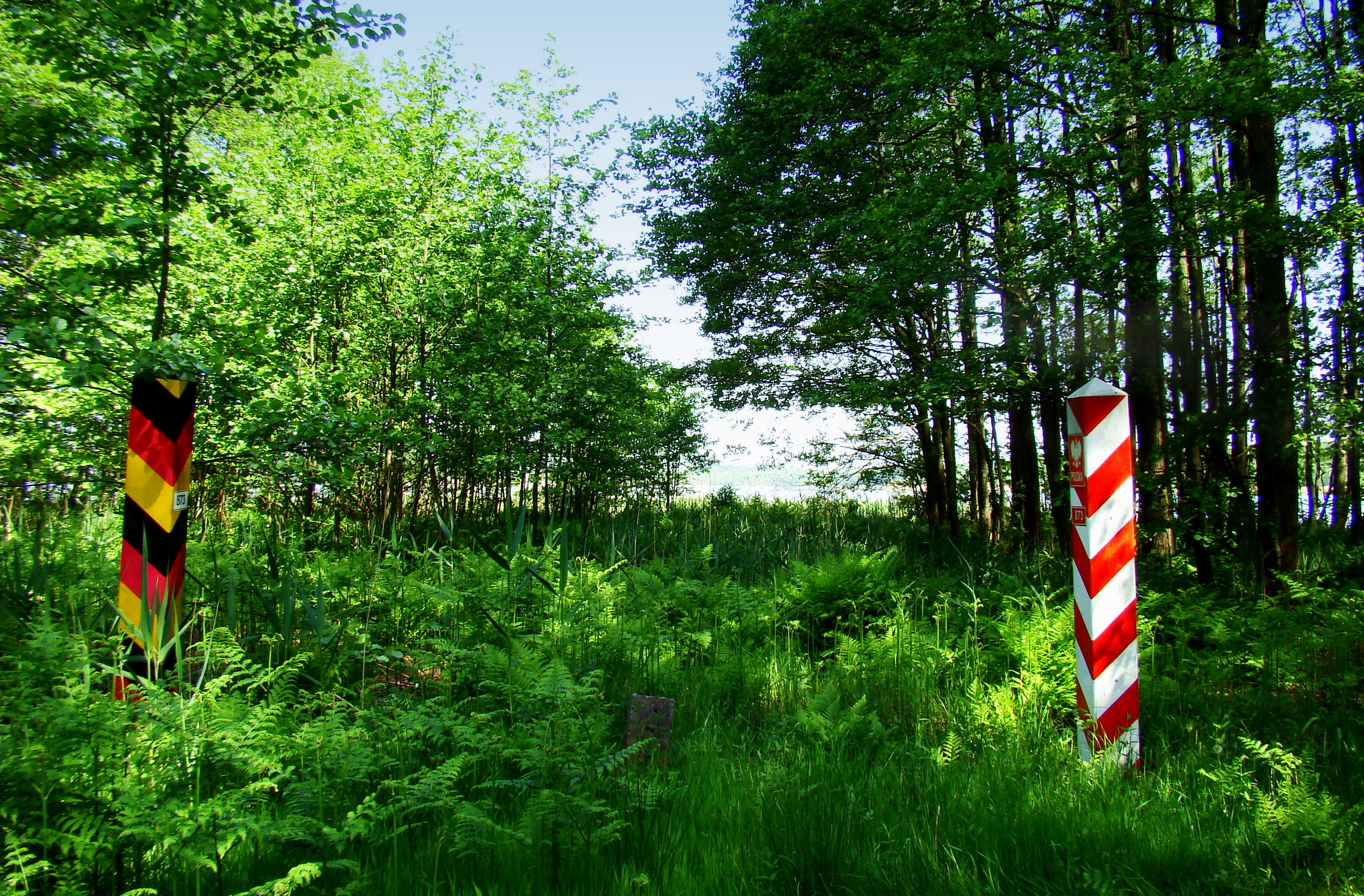
Boundary stones of Germany and Poland in the Ueckermünde Heath

Until the Treaty on the Final Settlement, the West German government regarded the status of the German territories east of the Oder-Neisse rivers as that of areas "temporarily under Polish or Soviet administration". To facilitate wide international acceptance of German reunification in 1990, the German political establishment recognized the "facts on the ground" and accepted the clauses in the Treaty on the Final Settlement whereby Germany renounced all claims to territory east of the Oder-Neisse line. This allowed the treaty to be negotiated quickly and for unification of democratic West Germany and socialist East Germany to go ahead quickly.

In accordance with a duty imposed on Germany by the Treaty on the Final Settlement, in the same year, 1990, Germany signed a separate treaty with Poland, the German-Polish Border Treaty, confirming the two countries' present borders.

The signature and ratification of the border treaty between Germany and Poland formalized in international law the recognition of the existing border and put an end to all qualified German claims.

== See also ==
- Polish areas annexed by Nazi Germany
- Territories of Poland annexed by the Soviet Union
- Kaliningrad question
- History of German settlement in Central and Eastern Europe
- Former eastern territories of Germany
- Territorial changes of Poland after World War II
- Territorial evolution of Poland
- Polish nationalism
- Irredentism
- Poland A and B
- Polonization
- Germanization
- Russification

== Bibliography ==
- Polak-Springer, P. (2015). Recovered Territory: A German-Polish Conflict over Land and Culture, 1919-1989. Berghahn Books. ISBN 978-1-78238-888-3.
- Parkin, Robert (2023-06-09). White Eagle, Black Eagle. Berghahn Books. doi:10.1515/9781805390039. ISBN 9781805390039.
- Gulińska-Jurgiel, P.; Kleinmann, Y.; Řezník, M.; Warneck, D.; Wallstein-Verlag (2019). Ends of War: Interdisciplinary Perspectives on Past and New Polish Regions After 1944. Polen: Kultur - Geschichte - Gesellschaft. Wallstein Verlag. ISBN 978-3-8353-3307-9.
- Kończal, Kornelia (2021-03-04). "German property and the reconstruction of East Central Europe after 1945: politics, practices and pitfalls of confiscation". European Review of History. 28 (2). Routledge: 278–300. doi:10.1080/13507486.2020.1860910. ISSN 1350-7486.
- Kończal, Kornelia (2023), Post-German Spaces, in: Yifat Gutman und Jenny Wüstenberg (ed.): The Routledge Handbook of Memory Activism, London and New York, Routledge, p. 345–349.
