= Piast Concept =

Political idea of Polish state based on its initial territories under the Piast dynasty

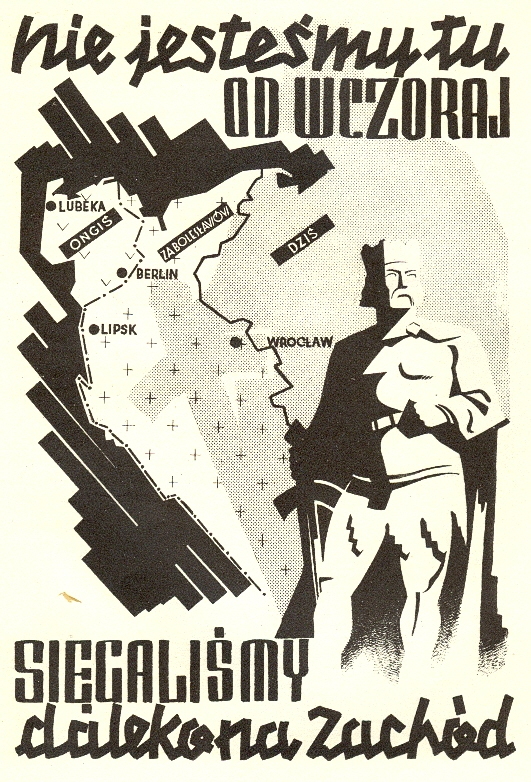
- An irredentist poster expressing the Piast Concept. It was produced during the Second Polish Republic (c. 1918–1939) that staked claims to western territory as far west as Leipzig (Lipsk), based on the historical reach of Polish/Slavic lands under Bolesław I the Brave. Even cities such as Berlin and Lübeck (Lubeka) was noted as potential areas. Poland would eventually gain some of these territories up to the Oder–Neisse line after World War II, such as Wrocław.
- Years active: 1890s–present
- Country: Poland
- Major figures: Jan Ludwik Popławski
- Influenced: National-Democratic Party (SDN); Polish United Workers' Party (PZPR)

The Piast Concept is a political ideology, historical narrative, and national myth that frames the Polish state around its earliest medieval territories. Developed in the 1890s by Jan Ludwik Popławski and championed by Roman Dmowski’s National Democracy movement (Endecja), it emerged as an ethnocentric alternative to the multi-ethnic Jagiellon Concept. It promotes the view that medieval Poland was a Western-oriented, culturally cohesive polity centered on its western lands (such as Silesia and Pomerania) rather than Eastern Europe.

While conceived by anti-communist nationalists, the concept was radically repurposed after 1945 by the Polish United Workers' Party (PZPR). It served as the primary geopolitical justification for Poland’s post-World War II border shift to the Oder–Neisse line, framing the annexation of former German provinces—the "Recovered Territories"—as a return to ancestral motherlands. Under communist rule, it became a mandatory state doctrine, leveraging strict censorship and "historical engineering" to erase centuries of German history, legitimize the regime, and normalize population displacements.

In contemporary historiography, the concept is widely rejected as an ideological myth. Modern historians criticize its aggressive institutionalization after 1945 as state-directed politics of history (polityka historyczna). It is heavily faulted for its reliance on the disproven autochthonous theory of unbroken Slavic continuity and for the systematic erasure of the region's cultural heritage. Today, academia treats the concept strictly as a subject of propaganda and nationalism studies.

== Ideological roots and the Endecja movement (1890s–1918) ==
The intellectual foundation of the Piast Concept was formulated in the 1890s by the political theorist Poplawski, who used his journal Przegląd Wszechpolski to fundamentally reorient Polish national strategy. Popławski argued that the traditional Polish obsession with reclaiming the lost multi-ethnic eastern territories (Kresy) was a geopolitical dead end. Instead, he directed the nation's attention toward the western lands under Prussian rule, such as Upper Silesia, Pomerelia, and Greater Poland, framing them as the ethnically cohesive "cradle of the Polish nation." Crucially, in this formative phase, the concept was strictly limited to territories that still maintained a substantial, biological Polish-speaking population; regions like Lower Silesia or Farther Pomerania, which had been thoroughly Germanized since the Late Middle Ages, were explicitly excluded from these early claims as irretrievably lost.

This theoretical groundwork was subsequently adopted and popularized by Dmowski, the leader of the right-wing Endecja, but was also supported by Polish peasant parties. Dmowski institutionalized the Piast Concept as a deeply ethnocentric, anti-pluralistic doctrine that defined Polish identity strictly by ethnicity and presented Germany as Poland's primary existential enemy. Regarding the millions of Germans living in these areas, the founders of the concept rejected any form of minority coexistence. Their strategy followed two paths: populations deemed to have historical Slavic roots were to be forcibly assimilated (repolonizacja), while the remaining German population was to be systematically pushed out. Through economic boycotts, exclusion from public service, and aggressive land reforms, the National Democrats planned to create an unsustainable environment that would compel the German population to emigrate.

== The interwar rivalry: Piast versus Jagiellon (1918–1939) ==
During the Second Polish Republic, the development of the Piast Concept was defined by its fierce ideological rivalry with the Jagiellon Concept, a competing national narrative championed by Poland's Chief of State, Józef Piłsudski. While the Piast narrative envisioned a compact, western-oriented national state, Piłsudski's Jagiellon vision looked toward the east, aiming to resurrect a multi-ethnic, federalist commonwealth (Intermarium) capable of buffering Poland against Soviet Russia. The Jagiellon Concept focused on the underdeveloped eastern territories inhabited chiefly by Ukrainians, Lithuanians, and Belarusians. Realpolitisch, the Piast Concept suffered a major setback during this era; the outcome of the Polish-Soviet War (1919–1921) and the subsequent Treaty of Riga pushed Poland’s borders far to the east, incorporating large Ukrainian, Belarusian, and Lithuanian minorities. Throughout the interwar period, Dmowski’s followers vehemently criticized these eastern borders, arguing that the inclusion of millions of non-Polish citizens weakened the state from within and distracted Poland from securing and integrating its vital western territories acquired after World War I.

== Wartime metamorphosis and communist adoption (1943–1989) ==
During World War II, the concept underwent a radical transformation through an unexpected convergence between Polish ethno-nationalism and Soviet geopolitics. Seeking to legitimize the permanent Soviet annexation of Poland's eastern territories, Joseph Stalin and Soviet-backed Polish communists radically repurposed Dmowski’s anti-communist narrative to justify a major postwar shift of the state's borders to the west., which the Polish government-in-exile opposed.

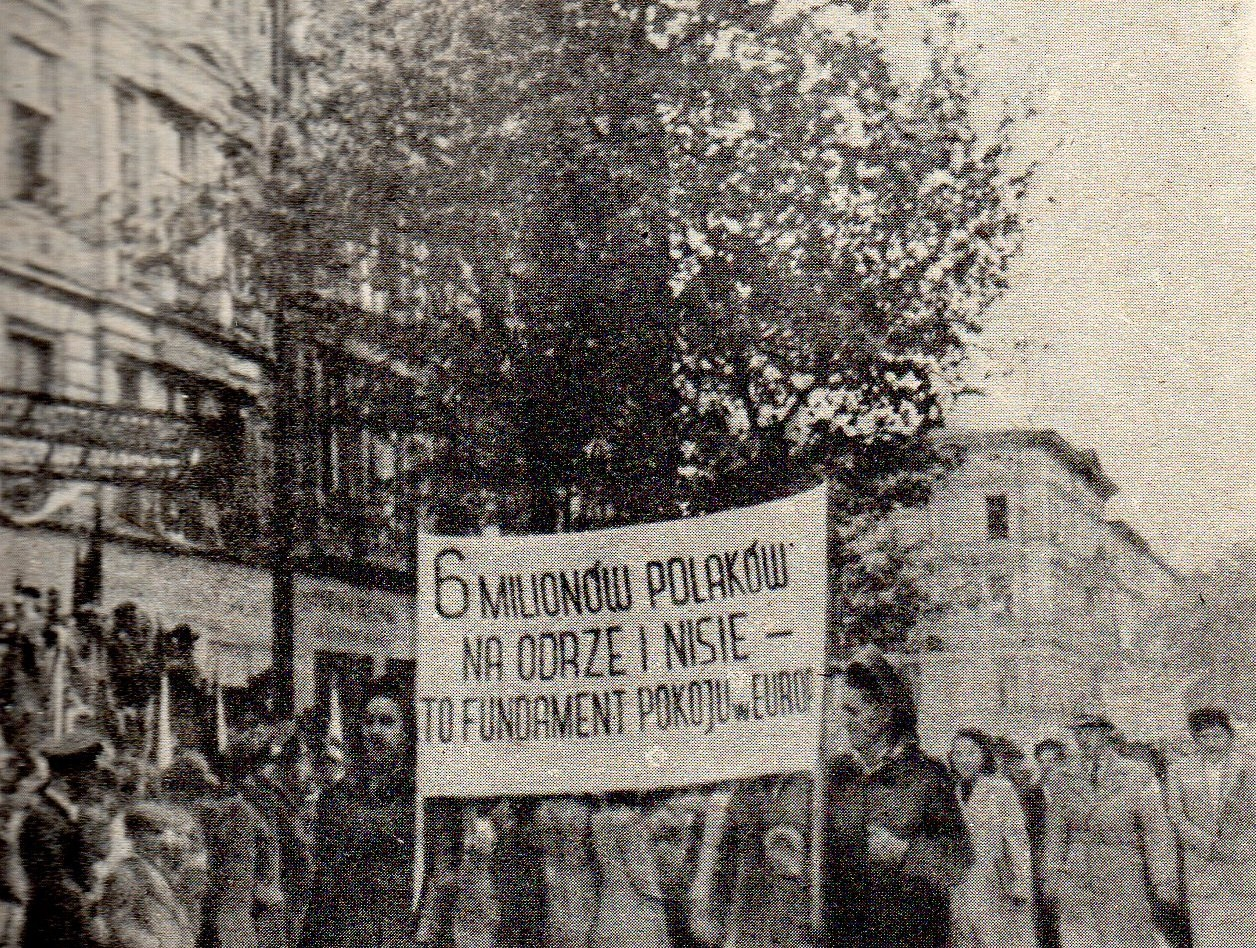
A banner during a May Day parade in Szczecin declaring that ‘6 million Poles along the Oder and Lusatian Neisse are the basis for peace in Europe’ (6 milionów Polaków na Odrze i Nysie – to fundament pokoju w Europie), 1947

By adopting the Piast Concept, the emerging communist regime found a tool to legitimize the postwar shift of Poland’s borders to the west. This wartime metamorphosis successfully cloaked a Soviet-dictated geopolitical compensation — the annexation of former German provinces — in the language of Polish national romanticism, framing the territorial overhaul not as a forced relocation, but as a return to Piast lands.

The concept was transformed from a political ideology into a mandatory state doctrine that completely subordinated historical sciences to party politics. Historical research in this era was not independent; rather, its primary state-mandated function was to manufacture the scientific and academic justification for the regime's ideological and geopolitical goals.

Under the strict guidance of the (PZPR), the entire academic infrastructure was mobilized for what modern scholars term "historical engineering". Institutions like the Western Institute (Instytut Zachodni) in Poznań and the Silesian Institute (Instytut Śląski) in Opole operated under political directives. Historians were systematically pressured to produce a "usable past" (użyteczna przeszłość) that legitimized the post-WWII borders along the Oder-Neisse line by inventing an unbroken, centuries-long Polish-Slavic continuity, while erasing the multi-ethnic reality of the region.

Academic output of this period was strictly controlled through several institutional mechanisms:

- State-Commissioned Research: Funding, academic promotions, and publication approvals were strictly tied to whether a historian's work supported the official "return to the Piast motherland" narrative. Research that did not conform to this ideological premise was suppressed.
- Systematic Erasure of German Historiography: Centuries of German history, local governance, and cultural achievements in regions like Silesia and Pomerania were either entirely omitted or reframed purely through the lens of a perpetual, aggressive Drang nach Osten (German expansion to the East). German sources were systematically ignored or discredited.
- Censorship and Enforced Uniformity: The Main Office of Control of Press, Publications and Shows (GUKPPiW) ensured that no critical or dissenting historical interpretations were published. Major historical realities—such as the violent nature of the expulsion of the German population, the parallel loss of Poland's eastern territories to the Soviet Union, or the widespread destruction of German cultural monuments—were turned into strict political taboos (blank spots; białe plamy).

== After 1989: Deconstruction and Lasting Cultural Legacies ==
Following the fall of communism in 1989 and the lifting of state censorship, Polish academia underwent a radical historiographical paradigm shift. Historians, archaeologists, and cultural scholars initiated a systematic deconstruction of the state-sponsored Piast myth, transitioning from an isolated, ethnocentric narrative toward a critical, transnational historiography. Central to this reassessment was the definitive dismantling of the autochthonous theory, as modern research replaced the long-standing ideological premise of an unbroken, prehistoric Slavic continuity in the Oder–Neisse region with more nuanced migratory models.

Simultaneously, contemporary scholarship deconstructed the romanticized view of the early Piast state as a culturally cohesive, Western-oriented polity, contextualizing it instead as a fragmented medieval territory driven by dynastic and pragmatic rather than ethnic interests. This shift also allowed researchers to address former historical taboos (białe plamy) by confrontingly reintegrating the centuries-long German history of regions like Silesia and Pomerania back into the academic discourse. Instead of treating the German heritage and the long era of Prussian or Austrian rule as a mere period of temporary foreign occupation, modern historiography recognizes these distinct cultural and architectural layers as foundational to the regions' actual history. Consequently, contemporary academic consensus treats the traditional Piast Concept strictly as an object of propaganda and nationalism studies rather than a scientifically objective framework for understanding Polish history.

Despite this academic reassessment, decades of intense communist propaganda left a profound "phantom memory" (pamięć fantomowa) that persists in contemporary Polish collective consciousness and public discourse. Scholars highlight several dimensions of this lasting impact:

- Kultury Osadnicze (Settlement Cultures): The material landscape inherited by the post-1945 settlers had been a historically German cultural and architectural space for centuries.. While the official "Piast" propaganda sought to normalize this space for the incoming population, modern ethnographical research indicates that the conceptual framework of "returning to native lands" remains deeply rooted as a psychological coping mechanism against displacement, continuing to shape regional identities across generations.
- Traces in Public and Popular History: Elements of the Piast narrative still frequently emerge in local tourism, popular history novels, and regional branding. Medieval Piast heritage is often disproportionately emphasized or romanticized, whereas the subsequent centuries of German history remain much less prominent in local memory cultures.
- Reactivation in Political Arenas: The vocabulary and underlying anxieties of the Piast Concept—specifically regarding the "defense" of Western Poland against foreign cultural or political revisionism—are occasionally re-mobilized by conservative or nationalist factions in modern political campaigns, revealing the ongoing availability of old PRL-era tropes in the public sphere.

In contemporary political science, the historical framework is occasionally referenced metaphorically to analyze post-communist developments; for instance, Poland's post-1989 pragmatic alignment with Western European institutions has sometimes been conceptualized as a modern, non-ideological reflection of a "Piast-oriented" foreign policy direction. In contrast, it is frequently juxtaposed with the "Jagiellon Concept", which is used in the same modern discourse to describe a more idealistic and active eastern policy aimed at promoting democratic integration and influence among Poland's eastern neighbors.

== Notes ==
1. Ewolucja systemu politycznego w Polsce w latach 1914-1998. T. 1. Odbudowanie niepodległego państwa i jego rozwój do 1945 r. Cz. 1, Zbiór studiów 1999. Polska myśl zachodnia XIX I XX wieku Czubiński Antoni
