= National-Democratic Party (Poland) =

Former political party in Poland

National-Democratic Party Stronnictwo Narodowo-Demokratyczne
- Founded: 1897
- Dissolved: 1919
- Succeeded by: Popular National Union
- Headquarters: Warsaw, Poland
- Ideology: Republicanism; Polish nationalism National Democracy
- Political position: Right-wing

The National-Democratic Party (Polish: Stronnictwo Demokratyczno-Narodowe, SDN) was a secret political party created in 1897 in the Russian Partition of Poland by the National League (Liga Narodowa), a conspirational Polish organization active in all three partitions. SND rejected the idea of armed struggle for Poland's sovereignty similar to Polish Positivists. Instead, SDN focused on non-violent opposition and legislative attempts at trying to stop the wholesale Russification and Germanization of the Poles ever since the Polish language was banned in the Russian partition in reprisal for the January Uprising. This however meant also rejecting cooperation with the linguistic and ethnic minorities living in the Empire such as Jews and Ukrainians who did not reciprocate the same sentiment. SDN was founded by Roman Dmowski, Jan Ludwik Popławski, and Zygmunt Balicki, to represent the National Democracy movement at elections. It was a political opponent of the Polish Socialist Party advocating armed resistance.

In 1919, when Poland regained independence, the National-Democratic Party was transformed into the Popular National Union. The latter, in turn, was in 1928 renamed Stronnictwo Narodowe (the National Party). Ideologically it promoted the Piast Concept, calling for a Polish-speaking Catholic Poland with little role for minorities.

In the German Reich, the majority of Poles were represented by the legal Polish Party ("Polenpartei"). It participated in elections and regularly returned members to the Reichstag. Its best showing was in the 1907 German federal election, when it took 4% of the vote and 20 seats.
