= Bystrzejowice Pierwsze =

- Village
- Interactive map of Bystrzejowice Pierwsze
- Location within Poland
- Coordinates: 51°8′36″N 22°42′27″E
- Country: Poland
- Voivodeship: Lublin
- County: Świdnik
- Gmina: Piaski

Bystrzejowice Pierwsze [bɨstʂɛjɔˈvit͡sɛ ˈpjɛrfʂɛ] is a village in the administrative district of Gmina Piaski, within Świdnik County, Lublin Voivodeship, in eastern Poland.

Polish journalist and politician Jan Ludwik Popławski was born here.
