= Rodacy Kamraci =

Movement and former far-right political party in Poland

- Abbreviation: KAMRACI
- Founder: Wojciech Olszański; Marcin Osadowski; Michał Kosiński
- Founded: 2021
- Registered: 30 June 2023
- Banned: 14 November 2024 (Note: Continues its activity illegally.)
- Headquarters: ul. Twarda 18, Warsaw
- Membership (2026): >20,000 (Note: Political scientist Przemysław Witkowski wrote in 2026 that the number of Rodacy Kamraci's members "oscillates between 20,000 and 40,000." In 2023, The Center for Monitoring Racist and Xenophobic Behavior estimated their numbers at 40,000. In 2022, Newsweek also estimated their numbers to be 40,000.)
- Ideology: Neo-fascism; Endocommunism; National Democracy; National Bolshevism; Ultranationalism; Anti-capitalism; Panslavism
- Political position: Far-right
- Religion: Neopaganism
- National affiliation: Fire Extinguisher Front (since 2025); Zmiana
- Colors: Red White Black
- Slogan: Death to the enemies of the homeland (Polish: Śmierć wrogom ojczyzny)

Website
- rodacykamraci.org
- Politics of Poland; Political parties; Elections; a: Its leaders as well as the organization itself have also been described as right-wing, left-wing, far-left, economically left-wing, or economically far-left.

Rodacy Kamraci (lit. 'Fellow Comrades' or 'Compatriot Comrades'), or Bracia Kamraci (lit. 'Brother Comrades'), is a Polish movement led Wojciech Olszański, Marcin Osadowski and Michał Kosiński, Between 2023 and 2024, it also functioned as a political party; it was delegalized in 2024, but continues activity illegally. In a broader sense, the so-called Ruch Kamracki or Kamractwo, is a movement of an extremely nationalist nature, founded in 2021 by Olszański and Osadowski. The movement itself was founded in Bydgoszcz in 2021, and functions as a network of informal associations that organizes through public rallies and Internet activity.

The movement portrays itself as inspired by the ideas of Roman Dmowski, the interwar ONR, and Polish partisan organisations, such as the Lizard Union and National Armed Forces. At the same time, it has expressed support for the Soviet Union, Joseph Stalin, Ivan Serov, national communism of Władysław Gomułka, as well as Bolesław Piasecki and his PAX Association (Endo-Communism), advocating anti-capitalist views. It considers Ukrainians, Jews, and Freemasons the national enemies of Poland, propagates pro-Russian Panslavism, and supports the governments of Vladimir Putin in Russia and Alexander Lukashenko in Belarus. Rodacy Kamraci espouse an eclectic combination of Polish nationalism and communism or socialism, and have been variously described as neofascist, Endocommunist, Chamo-Communist, or national communist.

Both the party and its movement have aroused controversy due to their views and association with acts of violence, organized crime and suspicions of espionage for Russia. In addition, as the promotion of totalitarian ideologies is prohibited by Polish law, there had been several legal attempts to ban the party, which ultimately succeeded in 2024. The movement became recognizable in 2021 due to its anti-vaccine activism, and surged in popularity in 2025, when an MP of the ruling Civic Coalition Roman Giertych accused it of rigging the 2025 Polish presidential election; moreover, its leaders were interviewed by mainstream news channel Kanał Zero later that year, sparking controversy given the interviewer's failure to control their extremist rhetoric; the channel partially censored the interview and included post-interview "fact-checking" commentary.

== History ==
=== Origins ===
The main leader and founder of Rodacy Kamraci is Wojciech Olszański, known under the nickname "Lizard" (Polish: Jaszczur) based on the WW2 Lizard Union that he identifies with. Born in 1960, he was deeply impressed by his neighbour, a former soldier of the independence underground, as well as Bolesław Piasecki, the leader of the PAX Association during the Polish People's Republic and of ONR Falanga before WW2. Olszański started wearing Falanga-like uniforms in the 1980s.

In 2000s and early 2010s, Olszański was politically active in the Real Politics Union and then the Congress of the New Right. He campaigned for the no vote in the 2003 Polish European Union membership referendum. In the 2000s, Olszański began to gain popularity through appearing on the YouTube channels of journalist Piotra Korczarowski and Eugeniusz Sendecki. Sendecki, an anti-vaccine doctor, former activist of the League of Polish Families, had become popular thanks to his channel promoting antisemitic, national communist, and fundamentalist Catholic figures and content. Sendecki initially paid Olszański to popularize his events, given his uniform and a cap adorned with the eagle and Szczerbiec. However, since 2010 Olszański started pursuing his own activity, first regarding the Smolensk air disaster, and protesting against American attempts to extract shale gas in Poland. He was deeply affected by the Smolensk air disaster and started advocating reconciliation with the Russian Federation since.

After meeting Marcin Osadowski (known as "Ludwiczek"), Olszański started his streaming activity on YouTube and other social media in 2016. Their channel became known as Niezależna Polska TV (NPTV), and became viral for statements made by Olszański and Osadowski when answering their viewers' phone calls. Later in 2016, during a protest in Warsaw, Olszański approached journalist Jan Bodakowski and volunteered for an interview; Bodakowski agreed, and the interview is considered to have made Olszański famous online for the first time. Between 2017 and 2018, political commentator and YouTuber Damian Bieńko known for exploring Polish far-right and far-left movements made over 600 videos featuring Olszański; he described Olszański as an Endocommunist.

In 2018, Olszański and Osadowski founded a political association named Polish National Front (Polish: Narodowy Front Polski) in 2018, which postulated withdrawal from the European Union, eviction of immigrants from Poland, and rapprochement with Russia. The association's goal was to unite radical nationalists of various political backgrounds and environments under a single banner. It participated in the 2018 Polish local elections, where it fielded Dorota Maksymowicz-Czapkowska as a candidate for the Mayor of Gdańsk. Maksymowicz-Czapkowska held "national-patriotic" views, and spoke against the privatization of the Krupiński Coal Mine, and advocated restricting immigration, reducing air pollution, eliminating "gender ideology" from schools and kindergartners, and ending the discrimination of unvaccinated children. She won 1427 votes, which amounted to 0.68% of the popular vote. In 2020, Olszański's wife, Agnieszka Fatyga, died, leading him to embrace anti-vaccine causes. He blamed the medical procedures implemented during the COVID-19 pandemic for his wife's death. Olszański had become much more radical after his wife's death, and would repeatedly state that he "does not care about anything anymore".

Olszański argued that the SARS-CoV-2 virus either does not exist or is controlled by the US military, He also argued that common flu is more dangerous than COVID-19, claiming that the former has a higher mortality rate. In 2021, Olszański and Osadowski met the Bydgoszcz Association of Kamractwo Rodaków (Polish: Stowarzyszenie Bydgoskie Kamractwo Rodaków, SBKR) founded by Michał Kosiński, which marked the beginning of Rodacy Kamraci. The popularity and recognizabiliy of the movement had skyrocketed thanks to its anti-vaccine postulates. Denouncing the pandemic as a "big scam of Big Pharma", Rodacy Kamraci earned 4 million PLN from donations alone between 2020 and 2022. In the 2020 Polish presidential election, Olszański tried to register as a candidate, but was unable to gather the necessary 100,000 signatures in order to appear on the ballot.

=== Foundation ===
Rodacy Kamraci existed since early 2021 as a network of regional associations, and the Bydgoskie Kamractwo Rodaków was joined by other associations such as Krakowscy Rodacy Kamraci, with the main organisation itself founded in Bydgoszcz in 2021 after a rally in the Old Market Square. Olszański led the rally and laid out an ideological manifesto of the movement. He praised the national socialist system of the Third Reich, propagated antisemitism, and expressed sympathy for Alexander Lukashenko. He also declared himself in favor of fascism, nationalism, and stated that he is a Stalinist, expressing his admiration for Ivan Serov. Rodacy Kamraci became associated with the leadership figures of Zmiana such as Maciej Poręba, who together with the movement had defended Stalin and the monuments of Soviet generals such as Ivan Chernyakhovsky in Poland. Rodacy Kamraci then started building up membership networks across Poland, and was reported to have amassed a notable following within the Polish diaspora in the Netherlands.

The movement gathered numerous local nationalist and paramilitary groups under the banner of Rodacy Kamraci, including Free Wolves of Podlasie (Polish: Wolne Wilki Podlasia), Free Wolves of Warsaw (Polish: Wolne Wilki Warszawy), Sea Wolves from the Coast (Polish: Wilki Morskie z Wybrzeża), Wolves of the Heart of Poland (Polish: Wilki Serca Polski) from Łódź, Silesian Resistance Movement (Polish: Śląski Ruch Oporu), Patriotic Movement ‘Front’ (Polish: Ruch Patriotyczny “Front”) from Częstochowa, Grunwald Association (Polish: Stowarzyszenie “Grunwald”) from Wrocław, National Guard (Polish: Gwardia Narodowa) from Szczecin, Sovereigns (Polish: Suwerenni) from Grudziądz, Conscious (Polish: Świadomi) from Piotrków Trybunalski, and Independents (Polish: Niezależni) from Chojnice. The presence of the "wolf" movements in Rodacy Kamraci's coalition led to the wolf becoming one of the symbols of the movement. These groups denounced the United Right as "traitors of Poland", and denounced the opposition to United Right as Jews.

=== Registration and delegalization ===
Since 2022, Olszański had been attempting to register a party based on the informal Kamractwo movement that he has been leading. On 19 October 2022, he filed an official request to register a political party under a name Partia Kamracka. At the beginning of 2023, he announced that the party would be registered ahead of the 2023 Polish parliamentary election. The party was eventually registered on June 30, 2023. The prosecutor's office filed a complaint against the court's decision to register the party with the aim of banning it in connection with the controversy surrounding the extremist views expressed by the group. The party announced it would field its candidates in the 2023 parliamentary elections, but ultimately failed to register their lists in any of the districts due to organizational problems, with the candidates failing to achieve any successes in local level elections.

In the 2024 Polish local elections, Rodacy Kamraci did not manage to register a nationwide electoral committee to contest the elections. However, it had registered two local electoral committees, Rodacy Kamraci Gdynia, and Kamraci for Wrocław, which Rodacy Kamraci promoted on its social media. Rodacy Kamraci Gdynia fielded candidates for the Rada Miasta Gdyni, winning 0.63% of the popular vote, while Kamraci for Wrocław contested the election for the Wrocław City Council and captured 0.58% of the popular vote. Neither won any seats. In the same election, Rodacy Kamraci were also a member of the National Action (Polish: Akcja Narodowa), a nationwide coalition of Confederation of the Polish Crown, There is One Poland, Real Politics Union, Safe Poland, Dmowski Club and Polish Thought Club in the Łódź Voivodeship, and the Roman Dmowski's National Party. It won 9,231 votes, which amounted to 0.06% of the popular vote, but did not gain any seat.

Rodacy Kamraci registered an electoral committee in the 2024 European Parliament election in Poland, but were unable to field any candidates. Ultimately, they approved the candidacy of Lucyna Kulińska, a professor of the Jagiellonian University known for her anti-Ukrainian views, who contested the election as a candidate of Bezpartyjni Samorządowcy.

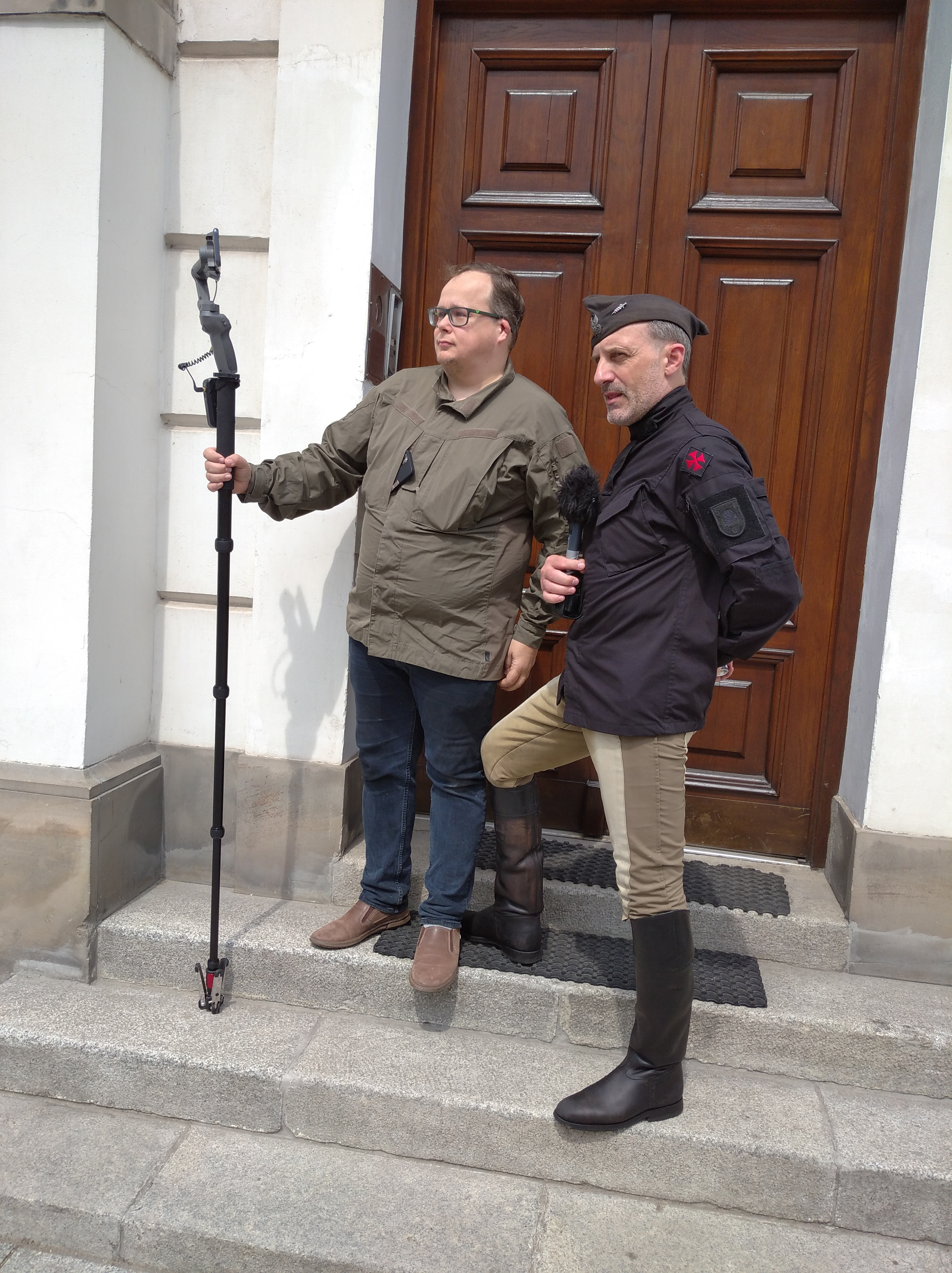
Marcin Osadowski and Wojciech Olszański in 2021

The party did not submit its financial report for 2023, therefore the National Electoral Commission was obliged to submit an application to the District Court in Warsaw for its deregistration, which occurred on November 18, 2024. Despite this, the party continued its activity illegally, reportedly becoming a part of the political environment of Grzegorz Braun. In December 2025, Kamraci appeared in support of Braun at his trial for using fire extinguisher to put out Hanukkah candles in the Sejm and disrupting the lecture of Jan Grabowski, whom Olszański denounced as a "Jewish libeler".

Onet noted an apparent contradiction between Braun and Rodacy Kamraci given the latter's defense of the Polish communist regime and its attempts to suppress 1980s protests. When asked about the presence of Rodacy Kamraci in their environment, a politician from Braun's party, the Confederation of the Polish Crown, dismissed it by stating that "the most important thing is that the leftists get their asses kicked". According to Gazeta Wyborcza, by 2026 the leader of Rodacy Kamraci, Olszański, has become Braun's main supporter. In February 2026, Braun doubled down on cooperation with Rodacy Kamraci, declaring that they are now "an integral part of the Broad fire extinguisher front".

More mainstream right-wing parties have shunned Rodacy Kamraci — in May 2026, both Jarosław Kaczyński, the leader of Law and Justice, as well as the party's candidate for prime minister, Przemysław Czarnek, declared that they would not cooperate with the Confederation of the Polish Crown because of the presence of Rodacy Kamraci.

== Ruch Kamracki ==
The Ruch Kamracki or Kamractwo is based mainly on informally operating regional associations (of which the most famous and largest are Bydgoskie Kamrarstwo Rodaków - operating in Bydgoszcz and the surrounding area and Krakowscy Rodacy Kamraci - operating in Małopolska), as well as associations related to them. The movement is formally decentralized and has no leaders at the local or central level, although it has been focused around Wojciech Olszański and his closest collaborators (including Marcin Osadowski) since around 2021, with its members (called Kamraci) commonly referring to Olszański as the leader and authority of the movement.

The movement uses symbols associated with Polish nationalism, Pan-Slavism and right-wing independence partisans operating in Poland under German occupation during World War II, such as the Lizard Union or the National Armed Forces. Popular symbols and flags include: a black flag with a white toporzeł inscribed in a red circle, a Slavic swastika, and a wolf. The movement also uses a white-red-blue eagle resembling the Nazi Parteiadler (the emblem of the SKBR) as its symbol, along with the Hagal rune once worn by the 6th SS Mountain Division Nord.

It became known for organizing "comrade marches" (Polish: marsze kamrackie), which often propagated Polish national chauvinism, used fascist rhetoric and symbols, praised the Polish People's Republic, especially the Endo-Communist period of Władysław Gomułka, spread antisemitism as well as homophobia. Members and participants in the movement were repeatedly arrested by the police for crimes committed during the marches. Such incidents took place during the movement's 2022 march in Grunwald, or a 2021 march in Kalisz. By January 2021, their YouTube channels had over 200,000 subscribers.

In August 2024, the movement organised "pro-Polish anti-war rallies" in Chorzów, Katowice, Sosnowiec, and Ustroń. In January 2025, Rodacy Kamraci celebrated the birthday of Janusz Waluś, who murdered Chris Hani, the leader of the South African Communist Party and anti-apartheid activist, in the Republic of South Africa. Waluś was initially sentenced to death, but his sentence was then commuted to life in prison, and in 2022 he was conditionally released from prison. In December 2024 he returned to Poland, where he was welcomed by political groups such as Rodacy Kamraci.

In June 2026, the movement founded the National Comrade Guard (Polish: Narodowa Straż Kamracka), which marched through the streets of cities such as Lublin in order to "capture Ukrainians". This group was connected to the so-called "citizen patrols" in Poland, in which Polish nationalists impersonate public officials and demand foreigners to produce their documents and verify that they stay in Poland legally. The National Comrade Guard has appropriated this trend, as its members wear black uniforms with black vests almost identical to the ones worn by the Polish police. Similarly, the movement around Braun and his party Confederation of the Polish Crown has also found a far-right paramilitary group Defending the Polish Border (Polish: Bronimy Polskiej Granicy, BPG), which wear dark green uniforms and rosaries around their necks; their stated goal is hunting down illegal immigrants.

=== 2025 presidential election ===
In the 2025 Polish presidential election, the movement supported Grzegorz Braun, and in the runoff, it endorsed Karol Nawrocki. They endorsed Nawrocki on the expectation that he would lead Poland out of the European Union.

After Nawrocki won the election, some MPs of the ruling Civic Coalition such as Roman Giertych, alleged that the election results had been falsified and called for a recount. Giertych accused Rodacy Kamraci of rigging election, claiming that the electoral commissions were "illegally taken over" by the movement and that "several thousand members" of Rodacy Kamraci became electoral commissions members. The accusation was met with ridicule from the media and other MPs.

An analysis of the electoral committees by OKO.press concluded that Giertych's claims were false, stating that the only political body with links to Rodacy Kamraci that placed its members in the electoral commissions was the electoral committee of Robert Śledź, an admirer of Aleksander Dugin and associate of Olszański. However, Śledź's committee only had 432 electoral commission members nationwide, and no irregularities were found in their conduct.

=== Kanał Zero interview ===
In November 2025, Wojciech Olszański and Marcin Osadowski were interviewed on Kanał Zero owned by Krzysztof Stanowski, a 2025 presidential candidate. In December 2025, Kanał Zero published the interview in an unusual format, as the statements of Olszański and Osadowski were cut up and often interrupted by appearances of journalists who countered their views. Released on 28 December 2025, it gathered almost 1 million views by 30 December, and attracted massive backlash. Liberal commentators criticized allowing fascist content onto a mainstream platform, with Polityka arguing that giving Rodacy Kamraci "a microphone is a crime in itself".

Adam Szłapka, the spokesman of the 15 October Coalition, claimed that spreading the views of Rodacy Kamraci serves the interests of Russia, while Stanisław Żaryn called it a "a threat to the security of Poland". Conservative media were, in turn, outraged at the hypocrisy of Kanał Zero, noting that the channel promised new quality and criticized old media for censorship, manipulation, interruption and twisting the statements of their guests, only to repeat this behavior. Media also noted that the interviewer was unprepared and struggled to provide effective responses to the extremist views and arguments expressed by Rodacy Kamraci.

== Ideology ==
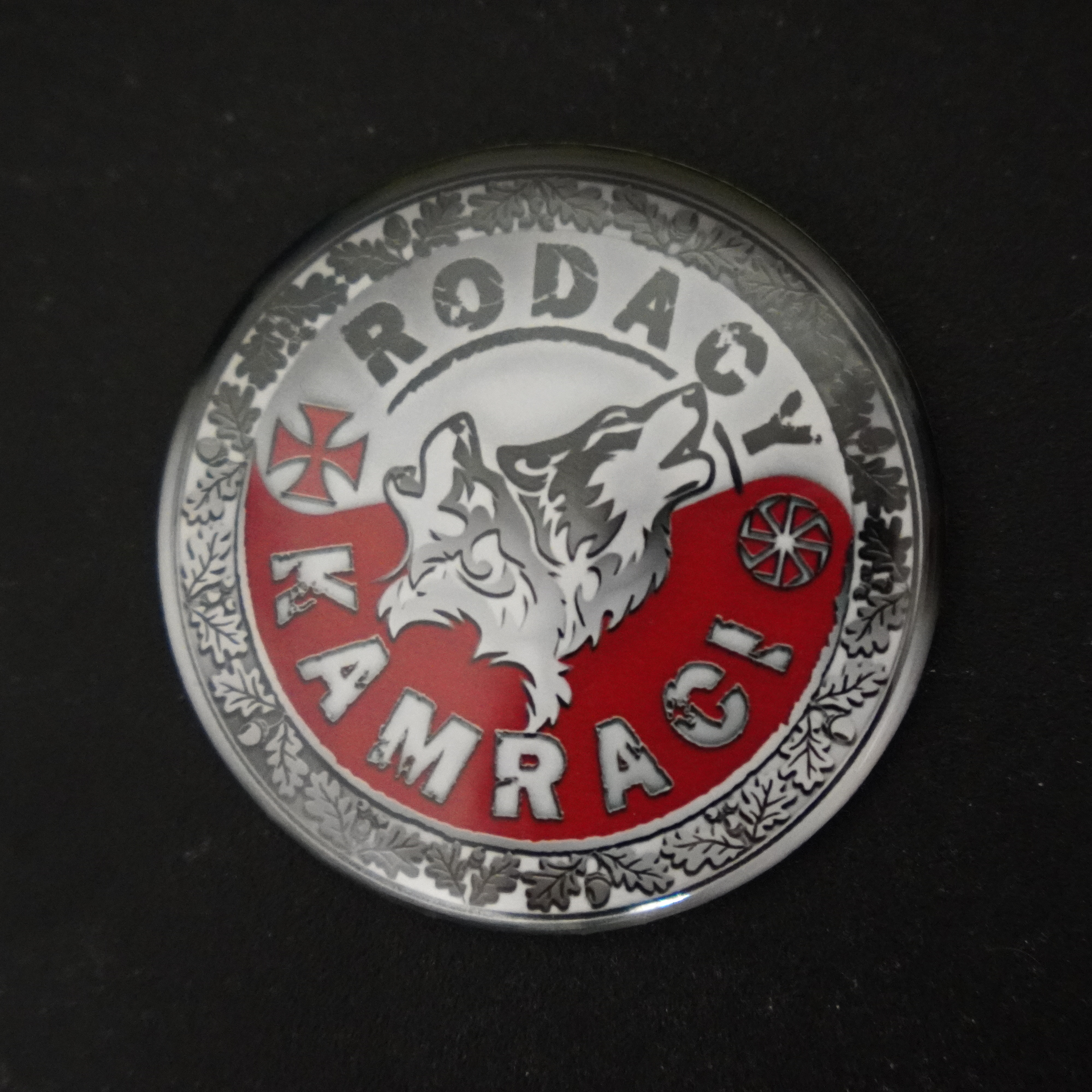
Pin of the movement.

Rodacy Kamraci and the wider Kamractwo movement are described as neo-fascist, anti-Semitic, nationalist-socialist, National Bolshevik, national communist, anti-capitalist, and pro-Polish People's Republic. Wojciech Olszański is the leader of the movement and its ideologue, and thus shapes the entire ideology of Rodacy Kamraci. Thus, Rodacy Kamraci are also referred to as "Olszewiks" (Polish: Olszewicy). Olszański himself refers to the achievements of the national-radical Lizard Union, with which he identifies himself. The party members promoted and believed in the Judeopolonia conspiracy theory, denied the COVID-19 pandemic, considering it a conspiracy, expressed hostility towards LGBTQ movements, the United States, Israel, and the post-Maidan government of Ukraine, calling the it an American puppet and a Banderite state.

The movement portrays itself as inspired by the ideas of the interwar National Radical Camp, as well as the national partisan organizations Lizard Union and National Armed Forces. Rodacy Kamraci are also inspired by and expressed admiration for the national communist regime of Władysław Gomułka, as well as Bolesław Piasecki and his PAX Association. Describing the ideology of Rodacy Kamraci, political scientist Rafał Pankowski wrote that they adhere to radical nationalism of the NSZ, Endocommunism of PAX Association and the Grunwald Patriotic Union, and antisemitic neopaganism of Zadruga. They consider the European Union, the United States, Israel, and Ukraine the enemies of Poland; they support the governments of Vladimir Putin in Russia, Alexander Lukashenko in Belarus, and Iran. The movement postulates an alliance with Russia, and China. Rodacy Kamraci espouse an eclectic combination of Polish nationalism and communism or socialism, and have been also described as Endocommunist, Chamo-Communist, or national communist.

Rodacy Kamraci have been described as far-right, and right-wing, with some further considering them an extremist or terrorist organization. At the same time, the movement's overlap with far-left postulates had been noted. It has been described as economically left-wing by Przemysław Witkowski, a researcher of Polish radical groups. Tygodnik Solidarność argued that Olszański and his movement are left-wing, noting his anti-Americanism, secularism, and support for abortion on demand, as Olszański argued that this policy had been successful in socialist Poland. Similar assessment has been made by news website Magna Polonia, which described the leaders of Rodacy Kamraci as left-wing. They have also been described as economically far-left. Jan Bodakowski questioned assessments of Rodacy Kamraci as right-wing, noting their glorification of socialist Poland, support for abortion, and Olszański's past association with the Civic Platform. Rodacy Kamraci have also been described as heirs to the Polish national communist tradition, including its specific ideologues and movements such as Józef Kossecki and the Patriotic Union Grunwald, and to far-left parties such as Samoobrona. Listing the movement's ideological inspirations, Gazeta Wyborcza wrote:

Jews are referred to as “anti-Polish scum,” and Ukrainians as “whores and thieves.” The revered figures include: the Targowica Confederates, Joseph Stalin, Eligiusz Niewiadomski (the assassin of the “Jewish” president of the Second Polish Republic, Gabriel Narutowicz), the interwar nationalist and militant, Bolesław Piasecki — a Christian Democrat licensed by the Polish People’s Republic, North Korean leader Kim Jong-un, Vladimir Putin as the “guarantor of peace in Europe,” and finally Belarusian President Alexander Lukashenko.

The movement refers to the views of Roman Dmowski, and declared itself an enemy of “Jews and Freemasons,” as well as Ukrainians and the Ukrainian state. Rodacy Kamraci also advocate pro-Russian Pan-Slavism on the basis of Greater Russia gaining primacy over all Slavic countries, including Poland. They also openly praised and supported the Russian Federation in the Russo-Ukrainian War while discrediting the European Union and NATO. Its views have also been described as "a mixture of extreme nationalism, antisemitism, and xenophobia with populism." Rodacy Kamraci are proponents of the theory of Great Lechia, claiming the existence of a Slavic empire that stretched from the Elbe to the Urals around the 7th century, and defeated Roman legions. They propagate the idea of "Great Slavdom", or a "Great Slavic World", inspired by Fyodor Dostoevsky and Alexander Solzhenitsyn, which postulates the establishment of a grand Slavic state led by Russia; Poland is seen as a "Judas" in the Slavic realm, abandoning its Slavic roots in favor of integration with the Western culture.

Rodacy Kamraci are described pan-Slavic, and accentuate that Poles are Slavs and Poland is a "Slavic land". Russia is not just considered an ally of Poland, but a part of the same entity, that of "Slavia". However, Ukraine is considered Slavic by Rodacy Kamraci. Olszański argues that Poland "should stick together with Russia, do business, and cooperate, because we are Slavs." Rodacy Kamraci supported the 2014 Russian annexation of Crimea and are known for promoting a "Slavic partnership" between Poland, Belarus, and Russia, as well as supporting the Russian-Chinese alliance to "guarantee peace". They argue that the US and Israel (collectively referred by the movement as "Usrael") are most harmful to Polish national interests. The movement supports various anti-Western tendencies, movement, and states; it supports Serbian nationalism, Palestine in the Israeli–Palestinian conflict, and the Islamic Republic of Iran. Ukraine, in turn, is condemned as a "neo-Banderist regime".

=== Communist influences ===
Rodacy Kamraci declare themselves Stalinists, and expressed admiration for the NKVD Commissar Ivan Serov. Olszański claimed that he joined the Motorized Reserves of the Citizens' Militia (ZOMO, communist paramilitary police) in 1980 and beat the anti-communist protesters from Workers' Defence Committee in defense of Polish nationalism. He stated that he takes pride in the possibility of having personally beat up Tadeusz Mazowiecki, the first prime minister of post-communist Poland. He claimed that he joined ZOMO specifically to maintain the communist rule in Poland, and glorified the Polish People's Republic. Olszański made Bogdan Poręba, a prominent member of the Endocommunist Patriotic Union Grunwald, as well as Albin Siwak, a national communist who considered the anti-communist opposition in Poland a Jewish conspiracy, frequent guests during his streams. He also declared his support for the leader of North Korea Kim Jong Un, and has praised the Red Army, calling them the liberators of Poland. Olszański stated:

Poles, poisoned by Americanism and a sense of invincibility — believing that the Virgin Mary will save them from everything — think they’re players in the game [of the Western powers], but we’re just cannon fodder. Piasecki knew this; he said that we Poles truly love the Soviet Union. I love it too. Really. I’m not being cynical.

The movement has also been described as communist, "a faction of the extreme left", and "chamo-communist", a term that refers to the communist Natolinians, and "Moczarists", the supporters of Mieczysław Moczar, the main representative of Endocommunism, and his faction of Partisans. In this context, the support of Rodacy Kamraci for communist Poland, communist agrarian reform, abortion, as well as its anti-Catholic statements, has been noted, along with the movement's praise for national communist figures such as Ivan Serov, Władysław Gomułka, Wojciech Jaruzelski, Bolesław Piasecki, and Kim Jong Un. Olszański considers socialist Poland under Władysław Gomułka to be "the only true Poland", stating that communist Poland "was right" and was "the legitimate state of Polish people". The movement supports and defends the legacy of the Soviet Union, while condeming the Polish anti-communist opposition as "Jewish". It also supports the People's Republic of China, postulating an alliance with it.

Commenting on Olszański's far-right views, Gazeta Pomorska called them a "performance", arguing that "anyone who were to take Olszański for a conservative nationalist would be seriosly mistaken", noting that Olszański is much closer to Maciej Poręba, a proponent of national communism, than to far-right conservative spaces. Olszański ideology has also been described as "endecja-tinged national communism". Olszański was interviewed by Polish Marxist–Leninist activists such as Michał Nowicki, who runs a YouTube channel Communist Rebirth (Polish: Odrodzenie Komunizmu). According to him, just like the communists, Rodacy Kamraci would expel NATO troops from Poland and sever all ties with US and NATO, arguing that their armies had only brought "death, famine, and annihilation" whenever they went. Olszański called the US a "criminal, genocidal, rogue state". When Nowicki stated that communists advocate the nationalization of banks, forests, mines and resources, along with the media, transportation, and pharmaceutical industries, Olszański declared that Rodacy Kamraci agreed with these demands and could "work out an agreement with communists", as they are on "one side of the barricade". Olszański also stated his admiration for Che Guevara.

==== Admiration of Juche ====
The party's leadership has expressed its support for North Korea, praising the country's policies and Anti-Americanism. The movement has denounced the reports of North Korean totalitarianism and human rights abuses as American propaganda, arguing that mainstream judgments about North Korea are "unfair" and that one should visit North Korea instead of forming one's opinion based on Western media reports. Commenting on the military parade held on the 105th anniversary of Kim Il-Sung's birth, and on Kim Jong Un, Olszański stated: "I know, he doesn’t fit the aesthetic and anthropological norms that we Europeans are used to, but if you look closely at the relationships between him, and the generals and marshals standing there, if you analyse the soldiers’ behaviour in this parade without preconceptions, then you'll see that not everything can be staged; some things must be genuine and stem from genuine attitudes." Rodacy Kamraci also called for an alliance with North Korea against the USA. Defending the North Korean communist ideology, Juche, Rodacy Kamraci argue that "North Korea can either remain as it is, or be overrun by Western moral decay, with same-sex relationships at the forefront."

Speaking on the ideological alignment of Rodacy Kamraci with Juche, Olszański declared his admiration for North Korea's economic system, particularly praising the fact that there is no income tax in North Korea, and stated that he would like to introduce Juche-style communism in Poland. He argued that socioeconomic postulates of Rodacy Kamraci align with communism — he postulated taking apartments away from landlords and handing them over to the working class, and described the social revolution in the People's Republic of Poland as excellent. He also contended that Poland's post-WW2 reconstruction was "possible only thanks to communism, because if there had been capitalism, Poland would not have been rebuilt"; he claimed that socialist Poland was an economic powerhouse that had low labor costs and prosperous working class. In 2022, Rodacy Kamraci promoted a referendum to nationalize water and all natural sources in Poland and make them public property of the Polish people, and gathered signatures for the project.

==== Endocommunism ====
The narrative of Rodacy Kamraci has been described as resembling that of Endocommunism, particularly of Mieczysław Moczar and the Grunwald Patriotic Union. They argue that socialist Poland "had undeniable social achievements" which one "can’t just brush that aside with a single kick". They have also praised Władysław Gomułka and Mieczysław Moczar for "cleansing Poland of Jews" (referring to the 1968 Polish political crisis), and praised Joseph Stalin as a good leader, stating that Poles need "to thank Stalin for creating a homogeneous, uniform society". Olszański has referred to the Polish anti-communist partisans (żołnierze wyklęci) as "scum". The movement has declared support for the government of the People's Republic of China, and argues that the United States is trying to force Poland into a war against Russia and Belarus in order to eventually fight China. According to Olszański, in 2016 Poland was on a brink of war with Belarus, and the situation was averted by Xi Jinping's visit to Poland, who allegedly persuaded the Polish government to not take action. Rodacy Kamraci condemn "Anglo-American imperialism" and state that Poland will be the biggest victim of international power struggles and potential military conflicts caused by it. Olszański claimed:

Chaos, epidemics, wars [are] because the Americans must seize control of the world, of Eurasia; they must strive for war with China, and war with China will come at the expense of Russia. The Ukrainisation of Poland is unacceptable, because Ukraine is a Banderist state, and Bandera gave the order to massacre all Poles. We cannot be in alliance with either Nazi Germany or Bandera’s Ukraine.

Olszański is considered to "combine Polish nationalist thought with communism/socialism, including its Stalinist form", and has been described as a representative of Endocommunism by scholars such as Polish historian Radosław Patlewicz. Tygodnik Solidarność described the ideology of Rodacy Komraci as Endocommunist and Panslavic, defining Endocommunism as "apologia for the Polish People’s Republic, General Ivan Serov, the PAX organisation, “Moczar-style” anti-Semitism and a pro-Russian stance". Łukasz Rempalski stated that Olszański "does not hold right-wing views" and instead "adheres to Endocommunism", being "drawn to proletarian-peasant ideals". Damian Bieńko, who had interviewed Olszański over 600 times, also described him as an Endocommunist.

Przemysław Witkowski, a researcher of political extremism, considers Olszański and Rodacy Kamraci modern heirs of the Grunwald Patriotic Union; according to Witkowski, the Grunwald Patriotic Union unified socialist law enforcement, WW2-era partisans, and military personnel, was strongly anti-Semitic, and postulated national communism, centrally planned economy, and closest possible ties with the Russia. After 1989, its members joined the ranks of parties such as Party X and Samoobrona. Witkowski argues that Rodacy Kamraci are the contemporary successor of this movement. He calls Rodacy Kamraci the heirs of "the school of Józef Kossecki, a former ideologist of the national-communist Grunwald". Gazeta.pl also identified the far-left Samoobrona and national-communist Grunwald Patriotic Union as ideological sources of the movement. Rodacy Kamraci have been endorsed by the first secretary of the Communist Party of Belarus Sergei Syrankov, who denounced Olszański's persecution by the "anti-nationalist Polish government".

=== Social views ===
The movement is considered anti-immigrant, anti-vaccine, anti-American, and anti-LGBT. Olszański denounced the LGBT community as a "sociological project" that is attempting to destabilise society. Rodacy Kamraci argued that "the Ukrainianization of Poles is a fact and part of the Anglo-Saxon project of depopulation of native people". It was part of the Polish anti-vaccine movement, and Olszański links his wife's death from 2020 to the vaccines and Polish government's handling of the pandemic. The movement has been described as pro-Russian, and after 2014, the movement became hostile towards Ukraine, emphasizing that “a Ukrainian is not my brother” and discussing the Volhynian massacres and Ukrainian hostility towards Poles. It also spoke against the LGBT movement, and Olszański declared that he would personally kill his son if he "turned out to be a faggot." The movement demands the expulsion of all foreigners of Poland, and foresees death sentence for all "enemies of the homeland".

Rodacy Kamraci are characterized by strong anti-Semitism. They accuse the Jews of being the cause of economic hardship of Poles, stating that "a mortgage on Jewish terms is stronger than any shackles" and claiming: "Coal prices, fuel prices, food prices, electricity prices—these are Jewish schemes; we cannot shoot Poles, we will starve them." Olszański himself stated that he would kill himself if he turned out to have even a single drop of Jewish blood. During an Independence March organized by the movement, Rodacy Kamraci burned a copy of the Statute of Kalisz, a historical document from 1264 that gave Jews equal rights to Poles. Olszański denounced the Polish history of granting rights to Jews, arguing that it had "instilled the belief that Jews in Poland are the masters and we are their slaves". The movement also demands the removal of an artificial palm in Warsaw known as Greetings from Jerusalem Avenue, arguing that the symbol only exists to make "Jews feel at home" and that "this is Poland, not Israel".

Both the leaders and members of the movement identified themselves as Polish nationalists, although their actions have been criticized by other Polish nationalist parties and groups, including the Confederation Liberty and Independence party and the National Movement, which strongly distanced themselves from their activities, considering them harmful and dangerous and ridiculing the Polish nationalist movement. However, at times, Confederation has worked together with Rodacy Kamraci. Confederation activists helped organize protests of Rodacy Kamraci in Warsaw and Bydgoszcz against the presence of NATO troops in Poland. Marcin Sypniewski, the MEP of New Hope and the regional leader of Confederation in Bydgoszcz, also stated: "I admit that Rodacy Komraci and we have a lot in common. We share similar views on vaccination, economic freedom, civil liberties… I admire their dynamism, though their pro-Russian stance doesn’t sit well with me. Overall, however, I view them positively."

Rodacy Kamraci are neopagan. The movement uses numerous neopagan symbols as means of self-identification, such as the "hands of God" (Polish: ręce boga), Slavic neo-pagan swastika known as kolovrat; the kolovrat is used by neopagan, anti-Christian, neofascist, and pro-Russian groups in Poland. The movement's central council, the Polish National Council of Comrades (Polish: Polska Narodowa Rada Kamratów), also uses the axe of Zadruga, an interwar Polish nationalist neopagan movement, as its symbol. Zadruga is one of the ideological inspirations of Rodacy Kamraci; Zadruga was an extreme neopagan group that was both antisemitic and anti-Christian, regarding Christianity as a Jewish invention. According to Gazeta Wyborcza, Rodacy Kamraci practise Slavic neopaganism and are not supportive of the Catholic Church. The movement also uses Toporzeł, an interwar Polish symbol used to mark non-Jewish shops in order to economically boycott Jews; it had been reused by antisemitic strands of Slavic neopaganism.

Olszański has also rejected the Bible as "Jewish", calling it a tale about "some fucking nation made some fucking covenant with a fucking God who doesn’t exist". Speaking of the Pope Francis, he referred to him as "that bitch in the white dress" and a "devil who’s destroying the foundation of our civilization". He later clarified that he only meant to reject the Old Testament. At the same time, Rodacy Kamraci organized demonstrations in defense of the Roman Catholic Church in Poland, such as a pilgrimage to the Jasna Góra Monastery in Częstochowa, to which Olszański called on everyone to attend "regardless of whether they are believers or not". Rodacy Kamraci carried Marian flags, and attempted to attend Mass in the monastery. At the same time, the protesters carried an image of a Saint Mary in bloodstained clothes, holding a shield over Baby Jesus, into which vaccine syringes and an arrow with a rainbow ribbon were stuck, giving the pilgrimage an anti-vaccine and anti-LGBT character.

=== Party's program ===
One of the founders of the party, Olszański, stated that Rodacy Kamraci "are nationalists, but not chauvinists" and that that their "nationalism will be based on the law, not on persecution or racism". Main postulates of the party listed by Olszański was reduction in the influence of LGBT activists on education, removal of voting rights from national minorities, reforming the Social Insurance Institution, and abolishing income tax. In justifying the income tax postulate, Olszański argued that Poles "must not feel punished for hard work", and that there is no income tax in North Korea. Rodacy Kamraci also intended to run in parliamentary elections.

The party opposed the merger of Orlen, a private fuel company, and Polskie Górnictwo Naftowe i Gazownictwo, a Polish state-owned gas and oil enterprise. Rodacy Kamraci denounced the merger as selling out Polish resources to foreign capital, and launched an initiative to start a nationwide referendum on whether all natural resources in Poland should be declared the public property of the Polish nation. The party also declared to be "in full support" of Russian President Vladimir Putin. The foundation of the party was reported by Belsat, which interviewed its founders. There, Olszański and Osadowski claimed that the Polish state persecuted anti-American opposition and they asked the Belarusian nation to forgive "Polish patriots" for the actions of Polish authorities that are "deliberately pursuing an anti-Belarusian policy".

The program of the Kamractwo group, adopted during the congress of the movement's supporters in Grunwald in 2022 (later also as the program of the political party) includes:

1. Economic protectionism in order to free the Polish economy from the unfair, according to party members, influence of large international corporations, while supporting free market mechanisms;
2. Abolition of income tax;
3. The Polish state as a nation state, ensuring that all Poles have the opportunity to develop freely, become rich and cultivate traditions;
4. Building peaceful and friendly relations with neighboring nations;
5. Simplification of legal provisions, basing Polish law on natural law;
6. Liberalization of the right to possess firearms;
7. Enabling citizens to make their own sovereign decisions regarding vaccinations;
8. Giving exclusive competence to parents to decide on the education and upbringing of children with specific values;
9. Supporting Polish farmers and entrepreneurs as the economic foundation of the Polish state;
10. Strengthening the Polish Army, military independence from other countries, the principle of exclusive loyalty to the Homeland by the army, the ban on serving the command of the superiors of the armed forces of foreign countries.

== Membership ==
A Polish organization led by Rafał Gaweł, the Racist and Xenophobic Behaviour Monitoring Centre (Polish: Ośrodek Monitorowania Zachowań Rasistowskich i Ksenofobicznych), estimated Rodacy Kamraci to have about 40,000 members in 2023. The same estimate was also given by Newsweek in 2022. However, in 2026, Przemysław Witkowski wrote that the amount of members "oscillates between 20,000 and 40,000." The movement itself reported that it had been contacted by about 500,000 sympathizers. A 2025 report requested and financed by the Chancellery of the Prime Minister of Poland found that the movement has membership networks across the entire Poland, and had also developed networks amongst Poles abroad, particularly the Netherlands.

According to Polish political scientist Rafał Pankowski, Rodacy Kamraci differ from Polish far-right groups such as National Radical Camp in the demographic structure of its supporters — instead of consisting mainly of young men, Rodacy Kamraci include middle-aged persons and a large number of women. Rodacy Kamraci attract people who feel rejected by the Polish political system and do not vote in elections in belief that there are no good options on the ballot. Moreover, Rodacy Kamraci are reported to be attracting poor people who "live paycheck to paycheck", struggling artisans and entrepreneurs, and those who believe to be treated like second-class citizens in Poland. Tygodnik Solidarność argued that Rodacy Kamraci appeal to anti-establishment voters, the "social underclass", as well "members of the intelligentsia with a distinct psychological quirk, bored with political correctness, seeking something offbeat and ostentatiously outside the norm", as well as those treating the movement as a "premier purveyor of entertainment".

In an interview with Gazeta Wyborcza, Przemysław Witkowski stated that Rodacy Kamraci's popularity is bound to rise because of "the pandemic, military and environmental threats, the economic crisis, changing social norms and the decline of traditional religiosity are causing many people", as these factors cause many "to feel a sense of uncertainty and a loss of security". He added that small business owners are particularly susceptible, as they have suffered because of the pandemic and feel wronged by large corporations; he also added that Rodacy Kamraci are popular amongst "young people fearing for their future, those who have been let down by the Catholic Church but have a deep need for faith and belonging; and people who feel lost".

In 2024, political scientist Bartosz Rydliński argued that "the working class in rural areas and small towns today speaks the language of Wojciech Olszański’s Rodacy Kamraci". Rydliński argued that the postulates of Rodacy Kamraci greatly appeal to the non-urban working class, who share Rodacy Kamraci's hostility towards Jews, Ukrainians, the Polish government, and hostility towards cultural leftism, which they associate with the "sexualisation of children". In 2025, Polityka repeated Rydliński observation, noting that the views of Polish working class outside of large cities reflect those of Rodacy Kamraci. In 2023, newspaper Najwyższy Czas! argued that Rodacy Kamraci are likely to siphon off votes from the Confederation Liberty and Independence, especially given their strongly anti-systemic credentials. National Movement is seen as particularly vulnerable to a possible challenge from Rodacy Kamraci, given its strongly nationalist voter base.

=== Organisation ===
Polish fact-checking website FakeNews wrote that "the Kamraci have built a large and well-organized network in Poland and beyond its borders". The most active group within Rodacy Kamraci is the Bydgoszcz Association of Kamractwo Rodaków (Polish: Stowarzyszenie Bydgoskie Kamractwo Rodaków, SBKR). Apart from Poland and the Netherlands, Rodacy Kamraci also have notable networks in Germany and the United Kingdom. The UK-based Kamraci Rodacy UK, founded in 2021 by Michał Kurzdym and Roman Klinkosz, was reported to have 2,000 members, having formed a well-integrated community that organizes local meetings in Scotland. The group has established its own radio station, Kamracie Radio, as well as Kamracki Sklep, a store selling movement-related merchandise.

The party of Rodacy Kamraci presented itself as "a party by Poles for Poles, modeled on the Endecja". The movement has its own moral code, known as the "Kamrat code" (Polish: kodeks kamrata), which includes keeping the movement's plans and activities secret. The movement's main motto is "Death to the enemies of the homeland" (Polish: Śmierć wrogom ojczyzny), which was the motto of the 3rd Vilnius Home Army Brigade, a controversial Home Army brigade that adopted Totenkopf with letters ŚWO (Śmierć Wrogom Ojczyzny) as its symbol. Led by Romuald Rajs, the brigade was dismantled by Polish People's Republic authorities and persecuted for war crimes.

The movement has become increasingly militarized, and the hosts of NPTV often pose with weapons, despite Olszański does not having a valid weapon permit. Both Olszański and Osadowski were reported to possess at least a dozen of firearms, which they acquired through shooting instructors in the movement that buy weapons for them under their own permits. The group enjoys the support of some gun shop and shooting range owners, with its members reportedly also organising training sessions at shooting ranges of Bydgoszcz and Sieradz.

Multiple movements and organisations function under the banner of Rodacy Kamraci, including Free Wolves of Podlasie (Polish: Wolne Wilki Podlasia), Free Wolves of Warsaw (Polish: Wolne Wilki Warszawy), Sea Wolves from the Coast (Polish: Wilki Morskie z Wybrzeża), Wolves of the Heart of Poland (Polish: Wilki Serca Polski) from Łódź, Silesian Resistance Movement (Polish: Śląski Ruch Oporu), Patriotic Movement ‘Front’ (Polish: Ruch Patriotyczny “Front”) from Częstochowa, Grunwald Association (Polish: Stowarzyszenie “Grunwald”) from Wrocław, National Guard (Polish: Gwardia Narodowa) from Szczecin, Sovereigns (Polish: Suwerenni) from Grudziądz, Conscious (Polish: Świadomi) from Piotrków Trybunalski, and Independents (Polish: Niezależni) from Chojnice. Other organisations that have joined the movement include Kedyw Poznań, Pancerni Poznań (a uniformed paramilitary anti-Ukrainian and anti-vaccine group), Chłostra Peasant Guard (Polish: Chłostra Chłopska Straż), as well as political associations United for Freedom (Polish: Zjednoczeni dla Wolności), and Poles' National Protest (Polish: Narodowy Protest Polaków).

== Electoral results ==
=== Local offices ===
Election year	Candidate	Party	Office	# of votes	% of vote	Elected?
2018	Dorota Maksymowicz-Czapkowska	Polish National Front of Wojciech Olszański	Mayor of Gdańsk	1,427	0.68%	No

=== Local assemblies ===
Election year	Body	# of votes	% of vote	Seats won
2024	Gdynia City Council	127	0.63%	0 / 5
2024	Wrocław City Council	197	0.58%	0 / 5

=== Regional assemblies ===
Election	%	Seats	+/–
2024	0.06 (#18)	0 / 855	Steady
2024	As part of the National Action (Polish: Akcja Narodowa).		

=== European Parliament ===
Election	Votes	%	Seats	+/–	EP Group
2024	Supported Lucyna Kulińska (Bezpartyjni Samorządowcy)				

=== Presidential ===
Election year	1st round			2nd round		
Election year	Candidate	# of overall votes	% of overall vote	Candidate	# of overall votes	% of overall vote
2025	Supported Grzegorz Braun	1,242,917	6.34 (#4)	Supported Karol Nawrocki	10,606,877	50.89 (#1)

== Controversy ==
The Kamractwo has repeatedly been the object of interest from the media, the Internal Security Agency and the police in connection with the activities of members and supporters of the group. The movement has been accused of, among others, espionage and propaganda activities for the Russian Federation, inciting violence against Jews, Ukrainians, homosexuals and people with left-liberal views, as well as promoting fascism and the Gomułka regime.

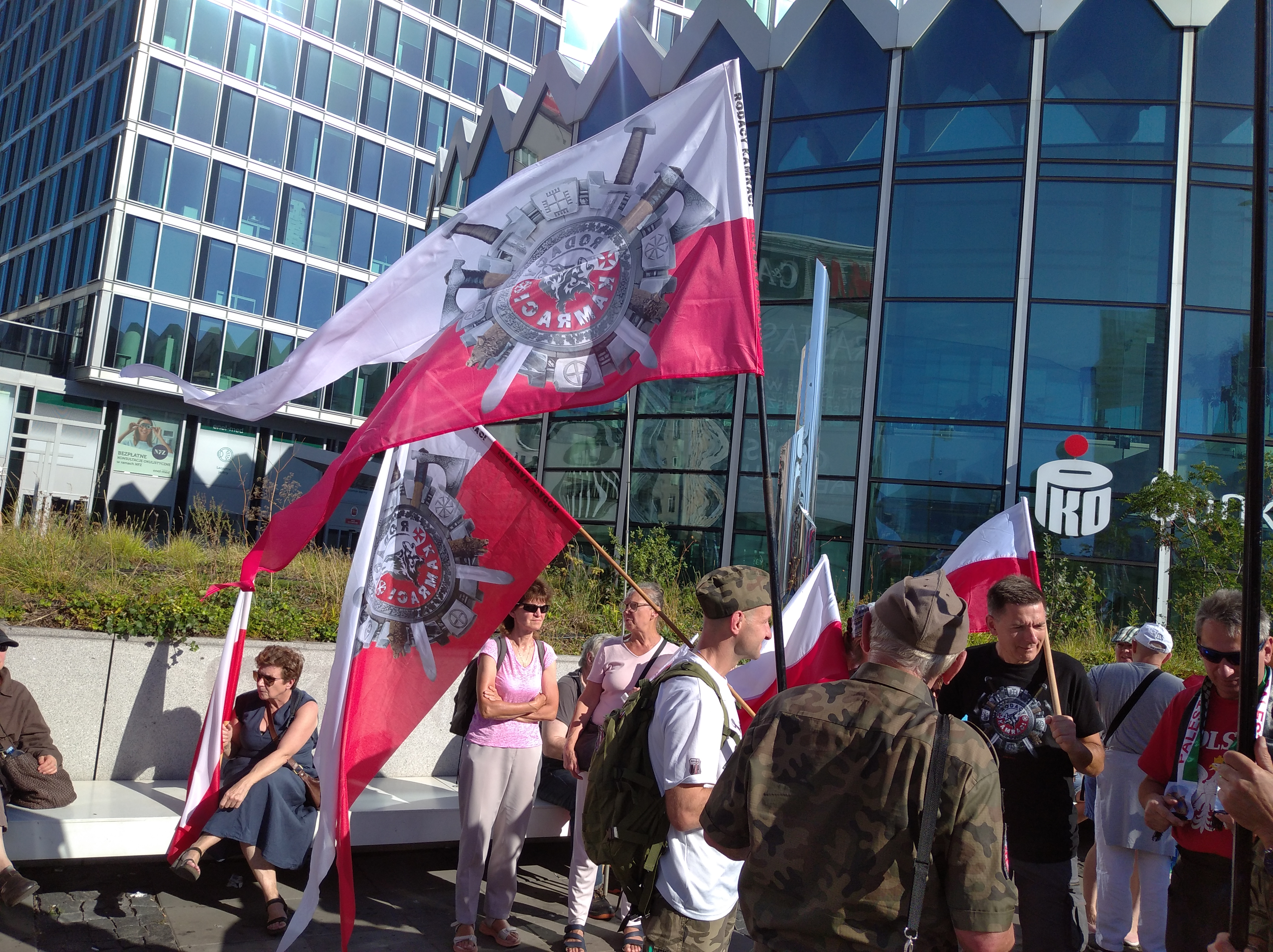
Flag of the Kamractwo at an anti-war march in Warsaw.

Since at least 2017, reports concerning statements by Rodacy Kamraci have been submitted to the public prosecutor's office, but on each occasion the office has only investigated individual incidents. Law enforcement authorities only took action against the movement in 2021, when, during a public gathering, Wojciech Olszański attacked a Belarusian oppositionist student with pepper spray after the student criticised him for glorifying the policies of Alexander Lukashenko.

On 11 November 2021, the movement organized the so-called March on Kalisz as a celebration of the Independence Day, during which, death threats, queerphobia and antisemitism were present. At the end of the event, Wojciech Olszański, burned a copy of the 13th-century Kalisz Statute guaranteeing Jews respect for their rights on Polish territory. The event was widely reported in the Polish and foreign media and caused a reaction from the Minister of Foreign Affairs of Israel, Ja'ir Lapid. During the event, Jews were called scum, and Olszański shouted: "Police officers, beat the hell out of our enemies on our behalf. Because they are our enemies. LGBTs, sodomites, Zionists – these are Poland’s enemies. Get out of our country! If we unite, we will triumph and drive this Polish-speaking rabble, just like in 1968, to Israel!" The organizers of the march were arrested after a few days, but they were released in December 2021.

The police intended to arrest Olszański and his associate, Piotr Rybak, again, in the act to charge them with criminal offences. However, the prosecution decided against further actions. After the incident gained media attention, Mayor of Kalisz filed a criminal complaint. The public prosecutor's office initiated proceeding and ordered the arrest of rally organisers, but the court soon ordered them to be released. Political commentators observed that Rodacy Kamraci have become "long accustomed to the lack of an effective response from law enforcement authorities to the hate crimes". After Olszański took part in an anti-vaccination demonstration of Bydgoszcz during which he announced his intention to kill Polish MPs, he was arrested again, and again released. The ineffectiveness of law enforcement measures against Wojciech Olszański and his movement has not only been the subject of journalistic criticism, but has also become the butt of jokes among internet users, who have dubbed it the ‘Jaszczur's life cycle’: release from prison – committing a series of hate crimes – re-arrest.

The leaders of the movement, Wojciech Olszański and Marcin Osadowski, were repeatedly arrested by the police and convicted by courts for criminal threats, inciting national hatred and violating the bodily integrity of people whose views they disagreed with. In September 2022, the e-mails of several organizations fighting against fascist organizations (including the Center for Monitoring Racist and Xenophobic Behavior) received threats, which included incitements to commit acts of terror against random people in order to force the state authorities to release Olszański, who was then in custody. In January 2023, the police detained Paweł Kondratowicz, an activist of the movement and the leader of the Poznań association, who from December 2022 was preparing to commit an attack on the then Minister of Health, Adam Niedzielski, having previously threatened him with death.

Olszański was arrested after a demonstration in Bydgoszcz in January 2022 and accused of inciting violence against members of the parliament, as he shouted “I want to kill them!” when discussing politicians working on anti-COVID-19 legislation. He was released in May 2022 but was again jailed in November 2022, as he was sentenced to six month in prison for inciting the murder of Bill Gates. In August 2022, he was also convicted for publicly inciting murder against Jews and Ukrainians, and completed his six-month prison sentence in April 2023. However, within the same month he was against sentenced, to one year and eight month in prison, for threatening the constitutional authorities of Poland, as he announced the creation of a "death list" of MPs who voted in favor of COVID restrictions.

Throghout 2022, Olszański was arrested multiple times on charges of spreading ethnic or racial hatred, although each time he was released, as the courts decided against pre-trial detention. Olszański threatened to create "death lists", stating that his revenge against political opponents "will be bloody". He also declared that he would "drop a bomb" on Campus Polska Przyszłości, a pro-Civic Coalition youth association, to "get rid of the insects". When a child called into Olszański's show and called him a "sower of death", Olszański threatened to kill the child. In September 2022, when interviewed by Monika Jaruzelska, Olszański and Osadowski declared that should they come to power, they would orchestrate a "Night of the Long Knives" against homosexuals and "Kristallnacht" against Jews.

On December 1, 2023, two policemen sitting in a police car were shot on Sudecka Street in Wrocław. The perpetrator was a man they were transporting, suspected of committing financial fraud, 44-year-old Maksymilian Faściszewski, who, due to procedural irregularities, managed to smuggle a black powder weapon into the police car and attempt to kill the policemen; he fled the scene after the murders, but was arrested. Maksymilian Faściszewski maintained contact with members of the movement via the Internet and expressed hatred towards policemen, Jews and Americans on social media, presenting views similar to those of members of the movement.

In January 2024, the Internal Security Agency detected a conspiracy in the Polish army aimed at committing a military coup and carried out several searches and arrests. The conspiracy involved, among others, members of the movement.

On 4 June 2025, Olszański and Osadowski were arrested in Dziekanów Leśny. They were to be detained for two months, but later the arrest was extended to 1 December 2025. In mid-August, the prosecution charged both men with a total of 154 charges, including public condoning of crimes, condoning and threatening violence on political grounds, publicly insulting persons on racial grounds, publicly insulting the "constitutional body of the Republic of Poland", condoning a war of aggression, and inciting hatred on racial grounds. The charges detailed over 1,200 incidents that took place between 2015 and 2024. On 22 November 2025, the District Court in Warsaw lifted the arrest and ordered the release of Olszański and Osadowski.

On 1 May 2026, Olszański was arrested again, for a duration of three months. On 8 May, Rodacy Kamraci announced in social media that Olszański was released. On 19 May, Olszański and Osadowski testified in a lawsuit against them in Bydgoszcz. They were accused of hate speech and death threats, as after Olszański allegedly attacked a Belarusian oppositionist during a rally, Rodacy Kamraci were to afterwards declare that Olszański "should have shot him" and made a statement about the need to shoot other representatives of the Belarusian opposition residing in Poland.

In June 2026, it has been reported that Polish National Compatriot Guard (Polish: Polska Narodowa Straż Kamracka), a branch of the Comrades stylized as a paramilitary militia, was impersonating police officers and stopping residents during a Compatriot rally in Lublin. According to reports, participants, equipped with radios and banners calling for the release of the movement's leaders, described as "political prisoners," marched through the city center. During the event, the European Union flag was allegedly trampled and controversial slogans were chanted. The spokeswoman for the Ministry of the Interior and Administration, Karolina Gałecka, later assured that the gathering organized in Lublin was reported in accordance with applicable regulations, and that the participants did not check the IDs of passers-by or undertake actions reserved for the police.

On 22 October 2026, Olszański was arrested in order to bring him to prison, as ordered by the Polish court. This was the result of a court verdict from September 2026, which convincted Olszański to 1.5 years of imprisonment for a plethora of minor crimes, such as inciting hatred.
