= Change (party) =

- Leader: Mateusz Piskorski
- Founded: 21 February 2015
- Registered: No (Note: Zmiana officially has never been registered as a political party because it was refused a registration by a court.)
- Think tank: European Centre for Geopolitical Analysis (ECAG)
- Trade union: Free Trade Union ‘Zmiana’ - Unity of Labour (Polish: Wolny Związek Zawodowy „Zmiana” – Jedność Pracownicza)
- Ideology: National communism Socialist patriotism Left-wing populism Left-wing nationalism Anti-capitalism; Anti-Atlanticism; Hard Euroscepticism
- Political position: Left-wing to far-left
- National affiliation: Broad fire extinguisher front
- Colors: Red
- Slogan: Labour, Peace, Patriotism (Polish: Praca, Pokój, Patriotyzm)

Change (Polish: Zmiana) is an unregistered left-wing political party in Poland. The party was founded on 21 February 2015 by Mateusz Piskorski, a former vice-president and spokesman of Self-Defence of the Republic of Poland. The party calls for rapprochement between Poland and Russia, and supports Russia in the Russo-Ukrainian War. In 2016, Piskorski was arrested on charges of espionage for Russia, Iraq and China. Piskorski was later released in 2019 on bail. Zmiana calls for a Polish exit from NATO, the abolition of capitalism, and establishment of an economy based on socialist and communist ideals. Zmiana officially has never been registered as a political party because it was refused a registration by a court. It is commonly accused of being a "Russian fifth column" by Polish right-leaning politicians and the press.

== History ==
=== Background ===
Zmiana was founded in February 2015 by Mateusz Piskorski, a geopolitical analyst and former parliamentarian of the far-left populist party Self-Defence of the Republic of Poland. Piskorski came in contact with Russian philosopher Aleksander Dugin in 2004 during his observatory mission to the 2004 Belarusian parliamentary election. Piskorski then went on to participate in the 2005 Transnistrian parliamentary election as an international observer; after returning to Poland, he proclaimed that he would work towards a Polish recognition of Transnistria.

In the face of electoral gridlock in 2006, Samoobrona decided to enter a coalition with right-wing parties Law and Justice and the League of Polish Families. This was done despite limited political overlap - Samoobrona was described as left-wing, nationalist and religious conservative. At that time, Piskorski became the spokesman of Samoobrona. The coalition collapsed, and the leader of Samoobrona, Andrzej Lepper, died in "strange and unexplained circumstances", with some arguing that Lepper's death was related with the revenge of Law and Justice.

After Lepper's death, Piskorski became the vice-president of Samoobrona. In June 2013, he went to Syria to support Bashar al-Assad. In response to the Annexation of Crimea by the Russian Federation, Piskorski became an observer in the 2014 Crimean status referendum, deeming it fair and justifying Russian actions as "a natural reaction to a situation in which country’s compatriots are threatened by Ukrainian nationalists".

In 2007, Piskorski also founded the European Center for Geopolitical Analysis (ECAG), which became the think tank of Zmiana. ECAG promotes Eurasianist ideology that advocates for a Eurasian society with Russia at its center. ECAG members were frequently invited to regions such as Crimea, Abkhazia, Transnistria, Nagorno-Karabakh, as well as countries such as Belarus, Libya and Syria, as electoral observers. In 2012, Piskorski travelled to Moscow and establishment more political links there.

=== Foundation ===
Zmiana was founded on 21 February 2015 by factions of communist youth organisations, former Samoobrona members and Falanga, as well as minor trade union, socialist, and anti-imperialist movements. Zmiana's founding congress also included a speech by the Minister of Foreign Affairs of the Donetsk People’s Republic, who attended through a video message as he was denied entry into Poland. Tomasz Jankowski was elected as the party's spokesman. While the leader of Falanga Bartosz Bekier was elected the vice-president of the party, Bekier and the rest of Falanga would later leave Zmiana in 2016, giving the party a more defined left-wing character.

Apart from Bieker, Zmiana was also joined by other politicians and political groups. The vice-chairmen of the party became journalist Konrad Rękas, Jarosław Augustyniak from the Polish Labour Party, and Nabil Al-Malazi, the president of the Arab Syrian Diaspora Association in Poland. The party's national council includes head of the KURSK Association Jerzy Tuc, editor of geopolityka.org portal Kornel Sawiński, Marian Curyło from the Self-Defence Social Movement, as well as Tomasz Rollnik of the Polish Socialist Party. The party submitted application for entry in the register of political parties at the beginning of 2015. However, the party was denied registration.

=== Early activities ===
The party was invigilated by the Internal Security Agency since its foundation, as Polish state officials suspected and accused the party of being financed and controlled by Russian intelligence agencies. In April, the state-owned TV station Telewizja Polska called the party "Putin's fifth column" and refused to interview Jankowski. Other Polish media called for a boycott of the party and refusing any interviews with it, arguing that giving Zmiana a voice would destabilize Polish social order.

The decision of Telewizja Polska and other media was condemned by activists of the Democratic Left Alliance, who stated: "You allow the far right to express their views in the form of RN, MW, KNP and KORWiN, and when the anti-capitalist party was formed, you denied it the right to freedom of speech. And unlike the far right, it does not promote racial or national hatred." Telewizja Polska responded to the accusations, stating that while it did interview far-right and antisemitic personas like Leszek Bubel, these were "products of our [Polish] own backyard", and alleged that Zmiana is Russian-funded and therefore "something else".

It was reported that Russian political movements established connections with Zmiana as early as in 2015, and utilized them to organize demonstration in support of the 2014 Russian annexation of Crimea.

In April 2015, youth activists of Zmiana protested against the unveiling of a plaque commemorating the victims of the Smolensk air disaster in Grudziądz. The party also called for an official recognition of the Donetsk People's Republic and the Luhansk People's Republic. In the same year, Zmiana welcomed Night Wolves on the Polish-Belarusian border. In response to the party's actions, Polish political scientist Grzegorz Baziur called for the arrest of the party's members, writing: "In the event of a possible Russian-Polish conflict or a real threat of one, they should be interned, like many activists of the Polish Communist Workers' Party in 1919-1920, who also demanded a change in the political system of the newly reborn Second Polish Republic and its incorporation into Soviet Russia at the time."

Zmiana attempted to participate in the 2015 parliamentary election, claiming it could capture up to 12% of the vote, though it ultimately failed to register as a party in the country's party registry. Prior to the election, Zmiana made an alliance with two left-wing parties, Party of Regions led by Bolesław Borysiuk, and Polish Left of Jacek Zdrojewski. The three parties formulated an electoral coalition and manifesto for the 2015 parliamentary and presidential elections "Alternative for Poland" (Polish: Alternatywa dla Polski), which rejected the dominance of Civic Platform and Law and Justice while also proposing a populist vision of an economy based on social justice. However, ultimately, the parties did not partake in the election.

In November 2015, Zmiana organized a protest at the Turkish embassy in Poland against the 2015 Russian Sukhoi Su-24 shootdown, where Türkiye shot down a Russian jet that supposedly repeated Turkish airspace.

=== Piskorski's arrest ===
On 17 May 2016, Piskorski was imprisoned for espionage on the behalf of Russia and China. Marxists circles criticized the arrest, noting that "what is spectacular the accusation was changing from being spy of Russia to being spy of China or Iraq"; some also connected Piskorski's arrest to Lepper's death, as Piskorski was writing a book about Samoobrona and the unexplained death of its leader. Law and Justice is alleged to have been involved in Lepper's death, and it became the ruling party in the 2015 Polish parliamentary election, shortly before Piskorski's arrest.

While Piskorski was never formally charged as there was insufficient evidence, Polish authorities held Piskorski in jail on grounds of there being "high probability of the suspect committing a crime". According to Gazeta Wyborcza, the motive for Piskorski's arrest was Zmiana's planned anti-NATO summit in Warsaw, where Piskorski was allegedly supposed to meet with Russian intelligence officers. Polish prosecution also accused Piskorski of "trying to influence public opinion in Poland". Piskorski's imprisonment was protested as unlawful by a number of European MPs.

In August 2016, during Piskorski's imprisonment, a member of the party's national leadership, Bartosz Tomassi, was also arrested by the police. Tomassi published photos of him holding a communist flag along with that of Zmiana, and also announced on social media that he would partake in a "new Olympic discipline" which would be "shooting people in the back of the head in the Katyń mass grave, against the clock". He was charged with promoting a communist regime. He pled guilty and voluntarily submitted himself to punishment.

=== Piskorski's release and aftermath ===
Piskorski's supporters and the Zmiana party raised funds and managed to have Piskorski released on bail in 2019. Charges against Piskorski were later dropped. In 2023, Polish political scientist Andrzej Szeptycki noted that no judgement was ever passed on Piskorski's case, and argued that "in fact, Piskorski might not have been a spy".

Shortly after being released, Piskorski publicly met with Piotr Ikonowicz, the leader of the far-left Social Justice Movement (RSS), in the headquarters of RSS. Both men announced that Zmiana and RSS are considering a political alliance, and announced a joint initiative to help unjustly arrested people in Poland. Ikonowicz praised Zmiana, arguing that "Zmiana has a program on social and economic issues that is 90% consistent with the RSS program." RSS was known for its close cooperation with the Polish Communist Party.

In the 2019 Polish elections for Senate, party vice-chairman Konrad Rękas ran in Senate Constituency 18 (Chełm) on the lists of Przywrócić Prawo, coming third with 7.87% of the vote (7,958 votes). When in detention, Piskorski was questioned about alleged ties to Manuel Ochsenreiter (Germany), Piotr Łuszczak (Die Linke, Germany) and Anna Eurdová (ČSSD, Czechia), as well as the United Romania Party, People's Party Our Slovakia and the Hungarian Revolutionary Movement. After his release, Piskorski became a contributor to the news agency Sputnik.

In the 2023 Polish parliamentary election, the vice-chairman of Zmiana, Nabil al-Malazi, ran on the electoral list of Repair Poland Movement. He obtained 163 votes in total, and did not win a seat. He died in 2025. In the 2025 Polish presidential election, the party did not field its own candidate, but backed candidates that aligned with its foreign policy proposals. It has ties with Maciej Maciak, the candidate of the Prosperity and Peace Movement that is considered pro-Russian, as well as with Grzegorz Braun, with Piskorski being a member of his electoral committee. After the first round, Piskorski wrote that "Grzegorz Braun is the only one with the potential to build a Polish, sovereign, national-conservative option." After the election, Zmiana became affiliated with Braun's party, the Confederation of the Polish Crown as part of the broad fire extinguisher front.

In February 2024, the Andrzej Lepper Civic Freedom Foundation (Polish: Fundacja Swobód Obywatelskich im. Andrzeja Leppera) was registered, and Tomasz Jankowski, the secretary of Zmiana, had become its representative at the Human Dimension Implementation Meeting.

On 5 August 2025, on the 14th anniversary of Andrzej Lepper's death, Zmiana organized a demonstration together with the Confederation of the Polish Crown and Lepper's son, Tomasz Lepper. The attendants called for Polexit and decried the privatization of Polish heavy industries. In 2026, it was announced that Piskorski would run on the list of the broad fire extinguisher front in the 2027 Polish parliamentary election. Zmiana has also become affiliated with Rodacy Kamraci, who also became a part of Braun's broad fire extinguisher front.

== Ideology ==
Zmiana is a left-wing, anti-capitalist, anti-American, and pro-Russian party. It advocates for a withdrawal from NATO and the European Union. Political observers noted that the party is shaped by Polish socialism based on the People’s Republic of Poland, as well as by the beliefs of the Russian nationalist philosopher Aleksander Dugin. The party was accused of being funded by anti-Western countries such as Russia, and Piskorski is also alleged to have had backing from Gaddafi's Libya. It has its own think tank, the European Centre for Geopolitical Analysis, as well as a trade union, led by Piotr Kret - the Free Trade Union ‘Zmiana’ - Unity of Labour (Polish: Wolny Związek Zawodowy „Zmiana” – Jedność Pracownicza). The slogan of the party is Labour, Peace, Patriotism (Polish: Praca, Pokój, Patriotyzm), based on the slogans used by the Polish United Workers' Party - Labour, Peace, Socialism (Polish: Praca, Pokój, Socjalizm).

The party has been described as national communist and communist — at the same time, it also refers to Polish patriotism and claims the tradition of the interwar Polish Socialist Party, naming Polish socialists such as Bolesław Limanowski, Ignacy Daszyński and Stefan Aleksander Okrzeja as its main ideological inspirations. Zmiana condemns Polish anti-communist parties and movements, such as the Home Army, the Freedom and Independence Association, Law and Justice, the Confederation of Independent Poland and the Solidarity movement. It has also been supported by the Polish socialist Social Justice Movement, led by former leader of the Polish Socialist Party Piotr Ikonowicz, who stated that 90% of Zmiana's social and economic postulates are consistent with his. At the same time, Zmiana supports Grzegorz Braun and his Confederation of the Polish Crown (KKP). Piskorski was a member of Braun's electoral committee in the 2025 presidential election, and afterwards became an associate of the KKP.

The party also calls for restoration of the 'good name' of the Red Army, and restoration of Soviet monuments in Poland. The party has been described as socialist-patriotic; in an interview with Polish journalist Jan Herman, Piskorski agreed that it could be considered an accurate description of Zmiana. In addition, some described it as National Bolshevik. According to its ideological declaration, Zmiana is a “democratic, anti-capitalist, patriotic, internationalist, peaceful, and progressive force” which “represents the interests of working people, the unemployed, the youth, and the elderly and pensioners” in liberating Poland from the “domination of the structures of big capital and the imperialist powers” and opposing the ruling “party of the Third World War.” Referencing its name, the party seeks “change, not mere cosmetic surgery, but a deep uprooting of the disgraced structures of the anti-social system”. The main demands of the party include:

- immediate exit of Poland from NATO;
- nationalization and socialization of strategic sectors of the Polish economy;
- establishment of a welfare state;
- reindustrialization;
- protection of Polish agriculture;
- reconciliation and deeper ties with "the countries resisting American hegemony", such as Russia and China;
- refuting the "Russophobic, anti-communist" negative assessments of the Polish People’s Republic in Polish media and education.

The party holds a positive view of socialist Poland, writing: "Since the collapse of the Polish People’s Republic in 1989, Poland’s institutions and society have been molded along the lines of neo-liberal capitalism; hence, Poland has become firmly situated in the Western geopolitical camp by dint of military occupation, economic enslavement, and ideological indoctrination." Zmiana argues for an establishment of a 'multipolar' world, arguing that the dominance of USA and Western Europe should be replaced by a "friendship and alliance from the Atlantic to Vladivostok". Greanville Post described the party as a "common anti-imperialist, socially-oriented front." Zmiana declares itself as an enemy of "USA, NATO, the bourgeoisie, fascists, and Ukraine". It opposes Israel, denouncing it as an example of "Jewish fascism", and postulates a global workers' movement against militarism.

Zmiana supports Russia in the Russo-Ukrainian War. On Ukraine, the party wrote: "Ukraine is a failed state. As soon as the West, including Poland, supported Bandera's followers in Ukraine, the country plunged into chaos", and "the people of Crimea have had pro-Russian views for a long time. They are afraid of Bandera's followers. We should be afraid too." Zmiana is also supportive of the fallen presidents Bashar al-Assad of Syria and Muammar Gaddafi of Libya. The party supports pro-Russian separatists in Donbas and considers the 2014 Crimean status referendum legitimate; it also declared its opposition to the "confrontational and anti-Russian" policies of the Polish government. Explaining why Zmiana considers Russian actions justified, Piskorski argued that "Russia’s support for Ukrainian separatists is a natural response to a situation where compatriots are endangered by Ukrainian nationalists."

Zmiana argues that Poland has become "a kind of transmission belt for Washington's interests", growing so politically and economically dependent on USA that Poland is "ready to commit any stupidity at Uncle Sam's request". The party opposes Polish membership in NATO, believing that it creates dependence on the military-industrial complex of Western countries, and has dragged Poland into wars in Afghanistan and Iraq. Zmiana argues that NATO is pushing Poland into a conflict with the Russian Federation, and warns of the possibility of a 'second Western Betrayal' where the main NATO countries would not defend Poland. The party is staunchly opposed to the presence of American troops in Poland, with its activists stating that "we say no to the presence of American troops in Poland, just as we say no to the presence of all foreign troops in Poland", and that "a nation that does not have the exclusive right to station its own army in its own country is not really an independent nation and is not capable of conducting its own policy".

Zmiana argues that "the CIA and NATO decide what happens in Poland". It denounces liberalism and color revolutions. It argues that since 1989, Poland has been “a semi-colonial market for Western goods and a reservoir of cheap labour for Western corporations”, and advocates the need to restore Polish independence, and proposed the “true” Polish raison d’état along with peaceful coexistence.

The party has been described as anti-establishment, and contains far-left, national-conservative and left-nationalist tendencies. Zmiana calls itself "the first non-American party in Poland", and emphasizes its anti-liberalism and anti-capitalism. Polish political scientist Paweł Gotowiecki describes the party as "Polish Syriza" (before Syriza's moderation), while also noting the pro-Russian views of the party as well as heavy inspiration from Dugin and his Eurasian movement. Zmiana's postulates are also comparable to that of Samoobrona, a party that Piskorski previously belonged to that Gotowiecki classifies as "populist-leftist, agrarian-populist, populist-nationalist, radically populist, popular-nationalist, or belonging to the national left." Gotowiecki also rejects the allegations that Zmiana was organized by Russian authorities, arguing that the party remains too marginal to be influential in politics.

== Electoral history ==
=== Sejm ===
Election	# of votes	% of votes	# of overall seats won	Government
2023	163	0.03 (#12)	0 / 460	Extra-parliamentary
2023	On the electoral list of the Repair Poland Movement.			

=== Senate ===
Election	# of votes	% of votes	# of overall seats won	Government
2019	7,958	0.51 (#8) (Note: Percentage of votes for electoral list Przywrócić Prawo)	0 / 100	Extra-parliamentary
2019	On the electoral lists of Przywrócić Prawo.			

=== Presidential ===
Election year	Candidate	1st round		Candidate	2nd round	
Election year	Candidate	# of overall votes	% of overall vote	Candidate	# of overall votes	% of overall vote
2025	Supported Grzegorz Braun	1,242,917	6.34 (#4)			
