= Broad fire extinguisher front =

Informal Polish alliance of anti-establishment parties

Broad fire extinguisher front (Note: Also known as the united fire extinguisher front (Polish: zjednoczony front gaśnicowy), fire extinguisher movement (Polish: ruch gaśnicowy) or simply as the fire extinguisher front (Polish: front gaśnicowy).) (Polish: szeroki front gaśnicowy) is an informal alliance of anti-establishment political formations concentrated around the Confederation of the Polish Crown (KKP), and its leader Grzegorz Braun. Despite being led by a far-right party, the front encompasses the entire political spectrum uniting both the far-left and far-right, and claiming to represent the "authentic anti-system" forces. It includes socialists, libertarians, national communists, as well as traditional Catholics and ultranationalists.

== History ==
=== Background ===
The core of the front, the Confederation of the Polish Crown (KKP) under Grzegorz Braun, gained two seats in the 2023 parliamentary election as a part of the Confederation Liberty and Independence (KWiN) alliance. KWiN initially planned to hold a set of primary elections, as it had done five years prior, to determine its presidential candidate in the 2025 presidential election. Both National Movement leader Krzysztof Bosak and New Hope leader Sławomir Mentzen declared their participation in such a primary, with Grzegorz Braun being considered a possible candidate. However, after Bosak announced his endorsement of Mentzen for the candidacy in August 2024, KWiN declared Mentzen to be its candidate without a primary. In opposition to this, Braun, who had been increasingly marginalized in the Confederation since the departure of Janusz Korwin-Mikke from New Hope leadership, declared a separate candidacy on 16 January 2025, leaving the KWiN alliance.

Over the months of the 2025 presidential campaign, Braun built up a following among anti-establishment figures across other minor parties, laying the foundations of the broad fire extinguisher front. In the aftermath of the election, in which Braun overperformed with 6.3% of the vote, he announced preparations for the front to proceed on one electoral list into the following 2027 parliamentary election and become a bigger political force, concentrating anti-establishment forces. Early on, Braun planned to establish a single political party with Janusz Korwin-Mikke, although they abandoned the idea, instead picking to concentrate on constructing a political alliance.

=== Growth ===
Since 2025, the front grew to include several members from across the political spectrum: Janusz Korwin-Mikke, Marek Woch of Bezpartyjni Samorządowcy, Wojciech Olszański and Marcin Osadowski of the Rodacy Kamraci movement, Janusz Waluś, Tomasz Sommer, Mirosław Piotrowski, Sebastian Pitoń, Stanisław Tymiński (1990 presidential candidate), and left-wing figures such as Mateusz Piskorski of the Zmiana party, Monika Jaruzelska (daughter of Wojciech Jaruzelski); Braun also encouraged former prime minister Leszek Miller to return to politics, stating that Miller would become his personal "ambassador"; Braun took no issue with Miller's long-time service in the Polish United Workers' Party. The Observatory of Online Democracy identified over 100 TikTok accounts supporting the front.

Braun called for the return of "authentic anti-system [parties]" to return to Polish politics as part of the front, naming Self-Defence, League of Polish Families, Christian National Union, There is One Poland, Right Wing of the Republic, Real Politics Union and the Congress of the New Right.

On 31 January 2026, KKP organized the "Congress of National, Economic and Self-governance Initiatives" (Polish: Kongres Inicjatyw Narodowych, Gospodarczych i Samorządowych, abbreviated to KINGS), coalescing many from outside of the party that affiliated with the broad fire extinguisher front.

In September 2026, the front was endorsed by Tomasz Jankowski, former Samoobrona spokesman and affiliate of Andrzej Lepper. In a left-wing Polish newspaper Strajk, Jankowski encouraged the "anti-globalist left" to join the fire extinguisher front, comparing it to parties such as German Sahra Wagenknecht Alliance, Slovak Smer, and Hungarian Marxist Artner Annamária's endorsement of Viktor Orbán. Jankowski stated that the leftist wing of the front is growing.

== Naming ==
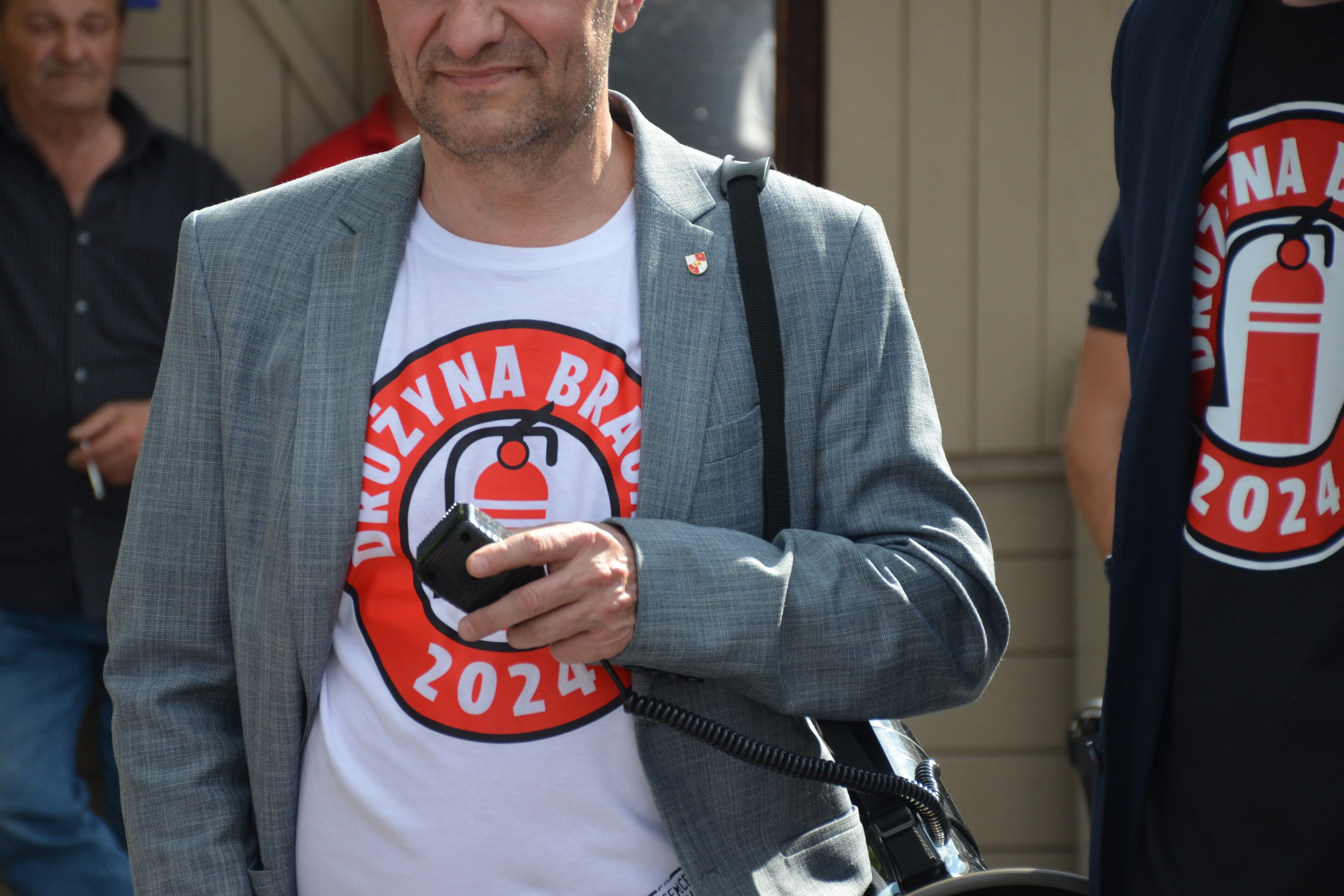
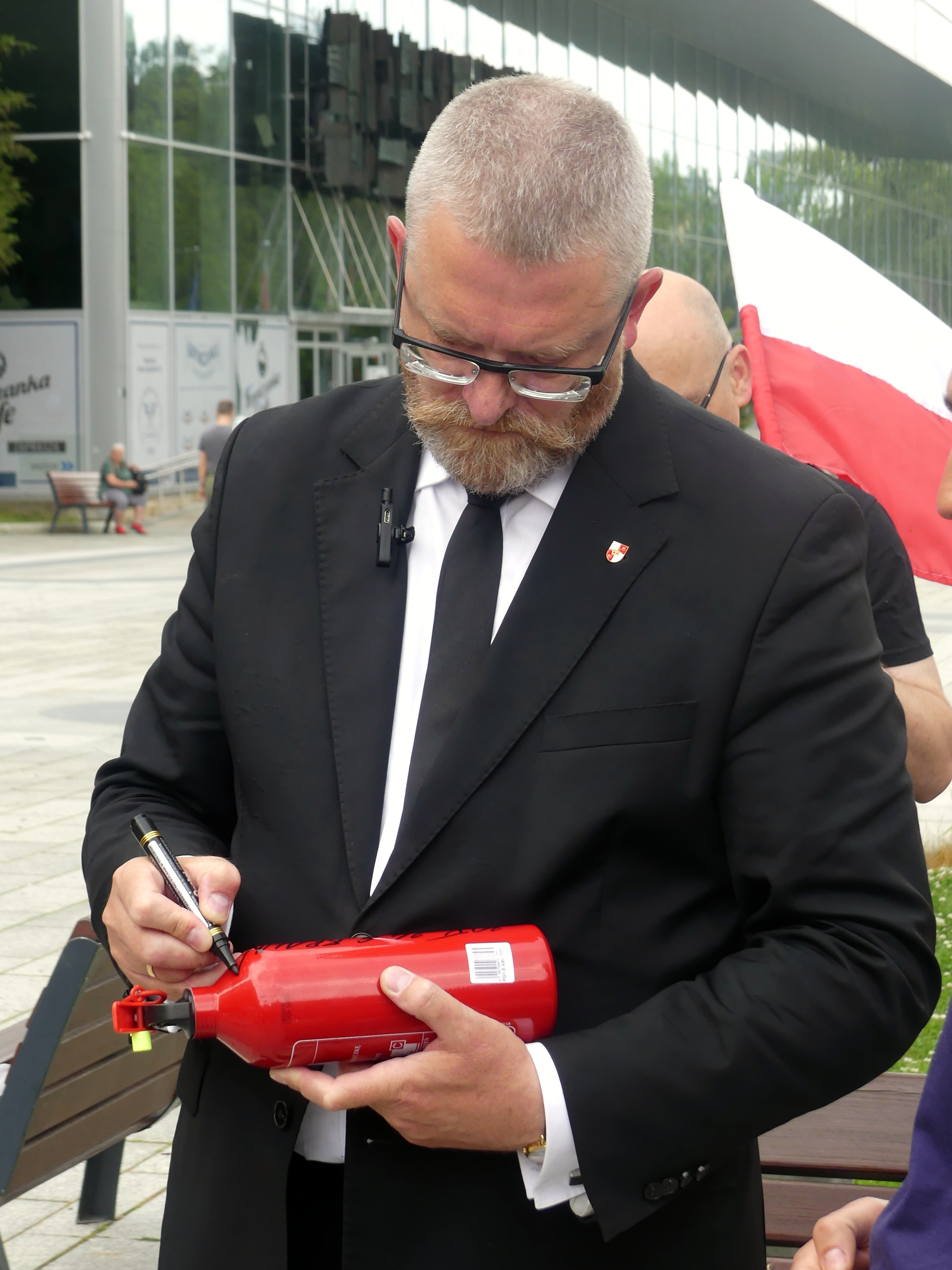
Left to right: Braun supporters wearing "Team Braun" shirts with the fire extinguisher symbol, Braun signing a fire extinguisher during his 2025 presidential campaign.

The name "broad fire extinguisher front" derives from a widely reported 12 December 2023 incident of Grzegorz Braun using a fire extinguisher to extinguish Hanukkah candles in the Sejm building. The fire extinguisher developed into a coalescing symbol for Braun and his allies, being utilized during Braun's political events and his 2025 presidential campaign. Early on, in January 2024, the term "fire extinguisher front" was used by Braun to refer to his support for the city mayor of Siemianowice Śląskie, Rafał Piech. The term gained in popularity a year later after Braun left the Confederation Liberty and Independence to start his own presidential campaign in January 2025, with Braun referring to a "united fire extinguisher front" extending beyond the right-wing scene. In the following months, Braun referred to his formation as the "broad fire extinguisher front". Supporters of the front are also sometimes referred to as "gaśniczaki".

According to political commentators, the fire extinguisher has been described as symbolizing active resistance aimed at removing or challenging perceived foreign influence over Poland and its political institutions, reflecting wider claims made by Braun and his supporters over alleged influence on national politics from the European Union and Israel.

== Composition ==
Name	Leader(s)	Ideology	Position
Confederation of the Polish Crown; Konfederacja Korony Polskiej	Grzegorz Braun	Enthronement Ultranationalism	Far-right
Bezpartyjni Samorządowcy	Marek Woch	Localism Christian democracy	Right-wing
Rodacy Kamraci	Wojciech Olszański; Marcin Osadowski	Neo-fascism Endocommunism	Far-right
Falanga	Bartosz Bekier	National Bolshevism Eurasianism	Far-right
Change; Zmiana	Mateusz Piskorski	Left-wing populism Left-wing nationalism	Left-wing to far-left
Confederation for the Renewal of the Republic Liberty and Independence; Konfederacja Odnowy Rzeczypospolitej Wolność i Niepodległość	Janusz Korwin-Mikke	Conservative libertarianism Hard Euroscepticism	Far-right

== See also ==
- Horseshoe theory
