= Falanga (organisation) =

Polish nationalist organization

- Leader: Bartosz Bekier
- Founder: Bartosz Bekier
- Founded: January 2009
- Split from: National Radical Camp
- Ideology: National Bolshevism; Revolutionary nationalism Strasserism; Falangism; Eurasianism; Hard Euroscepticism
- Political position: Far-right
- National affiliation: Broad fire extinguisher front
- Continental affiliation: Eurasia Movement
- Colors: Black, red and white
- Slogan: Polska! Młodość! Rewolucja! ("Poland! Youth! Revolution!")

Website
- www.xportal.press

Falanga is a Polish National Bolshevik organization which was founded in January 2009. It is led by Bartosz Bekier, former coordinator of the Masovian Brigade of the National Radical Camp (ONR).

== History ==
Pre-2019 flag

Falanga was founded by Bartosz Bekier in 2009, based on the Masovian Brigade of the National Radical Camp (ONR). Bekier, who was interested in politics, joined the ONR as a teenager in 2005. Inspired by Italian and Spanish fascism, he became head of the ONR's Masovian Brigade. Bekier left the ONR in 2009 after a failed attempt to take over the organisation and a dispute with former ONR leader Przemysław Holocher. At the peak of its development, Falanga had branches in Kraków, Zielona Góra, Bydgoszcz, Olsztyn, Gdańsk, Poznań and Warsaw. Their ideology is based on opposition to liberalism and globalization. Falanga supports Eurasianism, a geopolitical vision whose core is the alliance of Russia and Western Europe against the United States. Other notable (current or former) members of Falanga include Michał Prokopowicz, Ronald Lasecki, and Adam Danek.

=== Missions ===
==== Syria ====
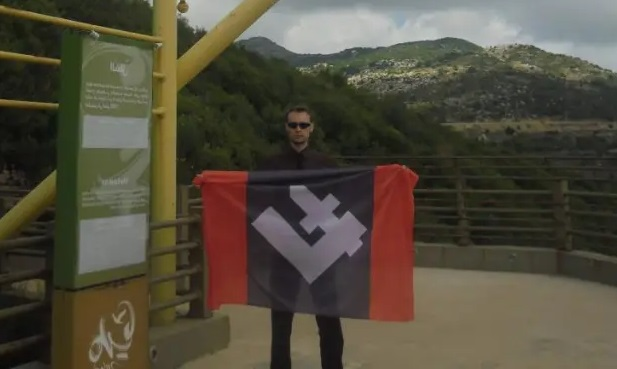
Bekier with a pre-2019 flag in southern Lebanon

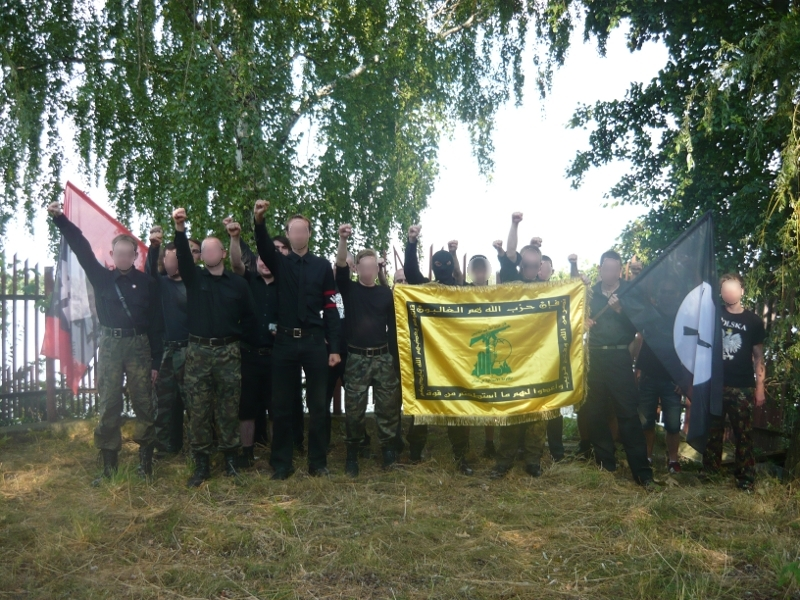
Assembly of Falanga and Hezbollah

Falanga began a mission in Syria in June 2013, engaging with the government of President Bashar al-Assad. Falanga representatives met with Syrian Prime Minister Wael Nader al-Halqi, the country's Grand Mufti, the Deputy Minister of Foreign Affairs, Christian clergy, government troops, Hezbollah, and representatives of the Syrian Social Nationalist Party.

==== Donbas ====
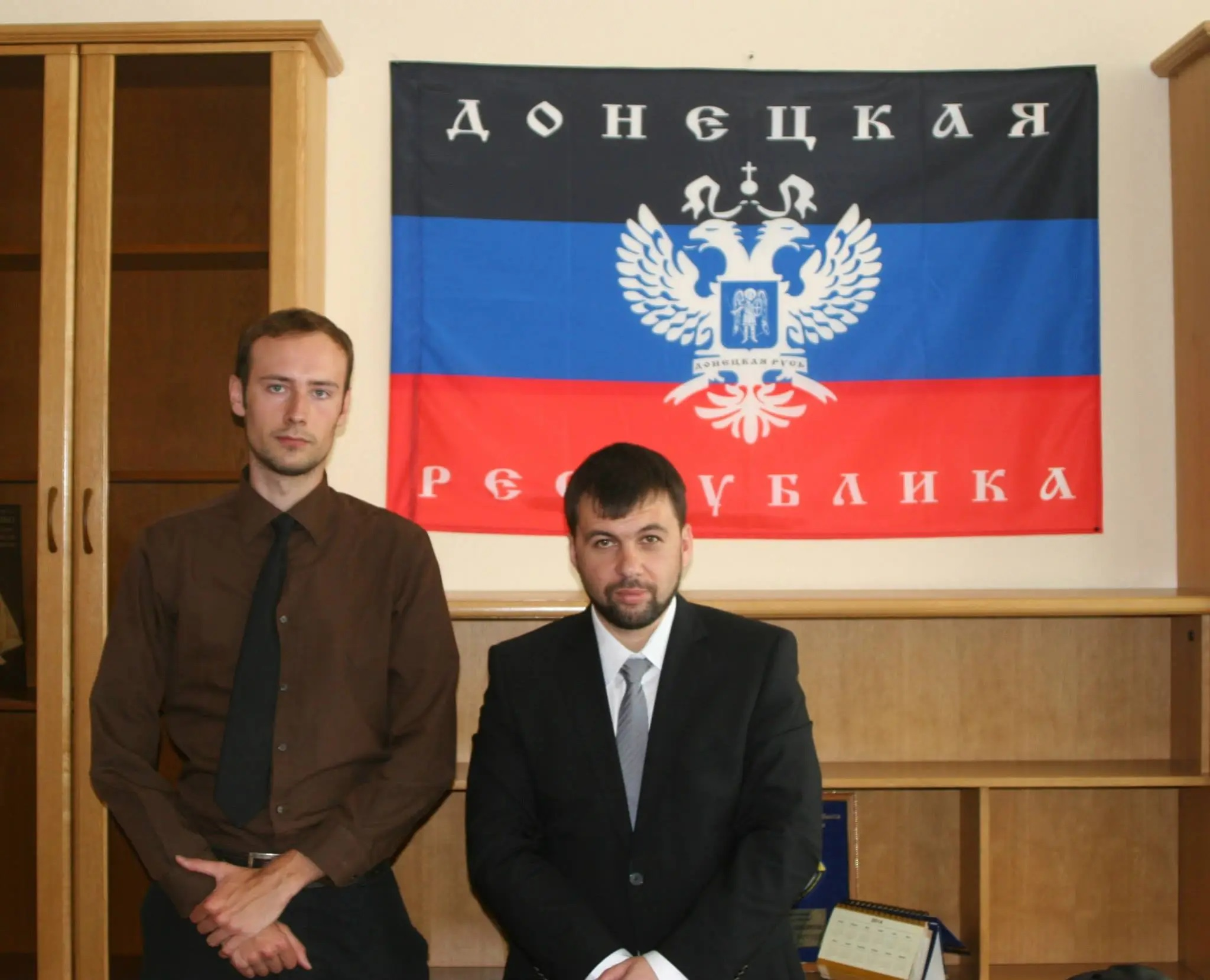
Falanga leader Bartosz Bekier (left) and Donetsk People's Republic prime minister Denis Pushilin

During a mission to eastern Ukraine in 2014, Falanga expressed support for the separatist Donetsk People's Republic and the Luhansk People's Republic in Donbas. Falanga leader Bekier also met with Denis Pushilin, prime minister of the Donetsk People's Republic, and interviewed Pushilin for Xportal. In October 2014, Ukrainian border guards detained several Falanga members and banned them from entering Ukraine for three years.

=== Zmiana party ===
Falanga joined the new, pro-Russian Zmiana party in February 2015, which was founded by former MP and Samoobrona RP spokesman Mateusz Piskorski. Bekier became deputy head of Zmiana, and Krakow Falanga member Michał Prokopowicz became its security expert and regional coordinator for Lesser Poland. On May 2, 2016, Bekier published a statement about his departure from the party. Zmiana leader Mateusz Piskorski was arrested 16 days later by the Internal Security Agency, and was later charged with spying for Russia and China.

=== Alliance with Czech National Democracy party ===
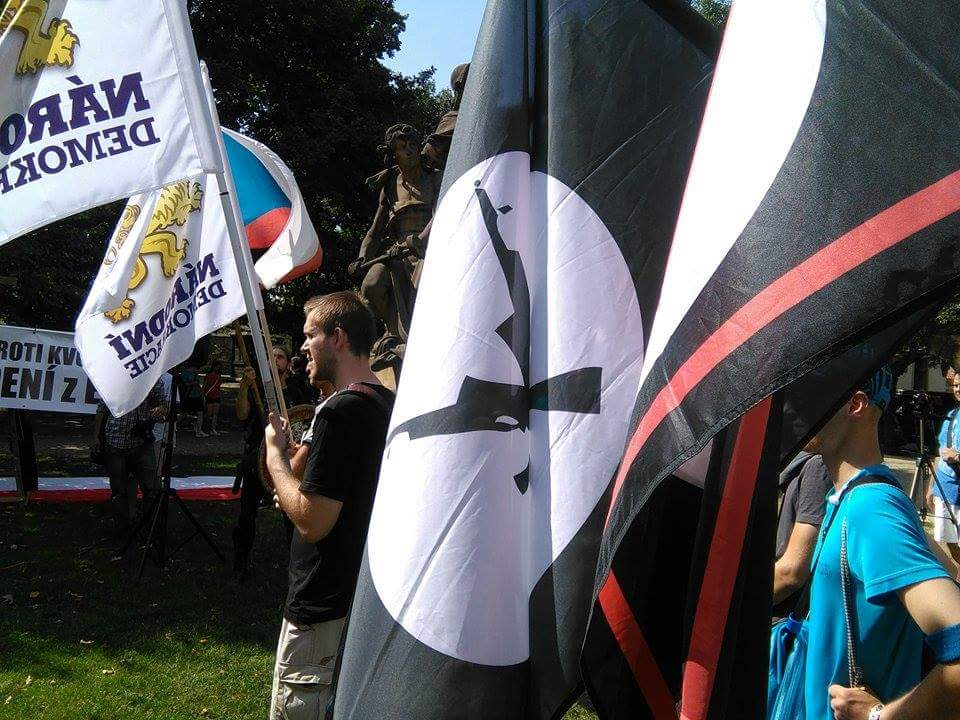
Falanga and National Democracy demonstrators in Prague

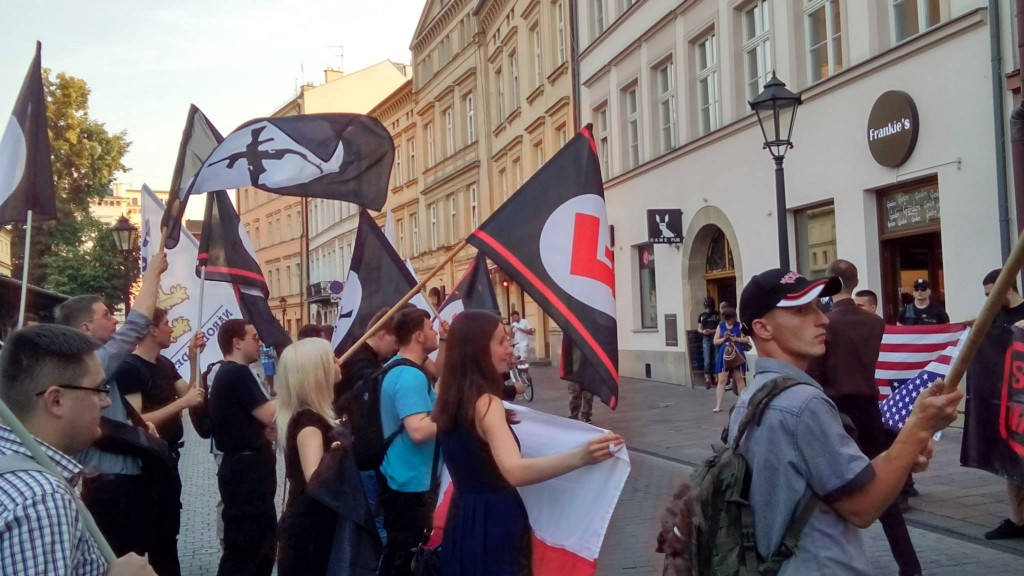
Anti-American protest at the US consulate in Kraków

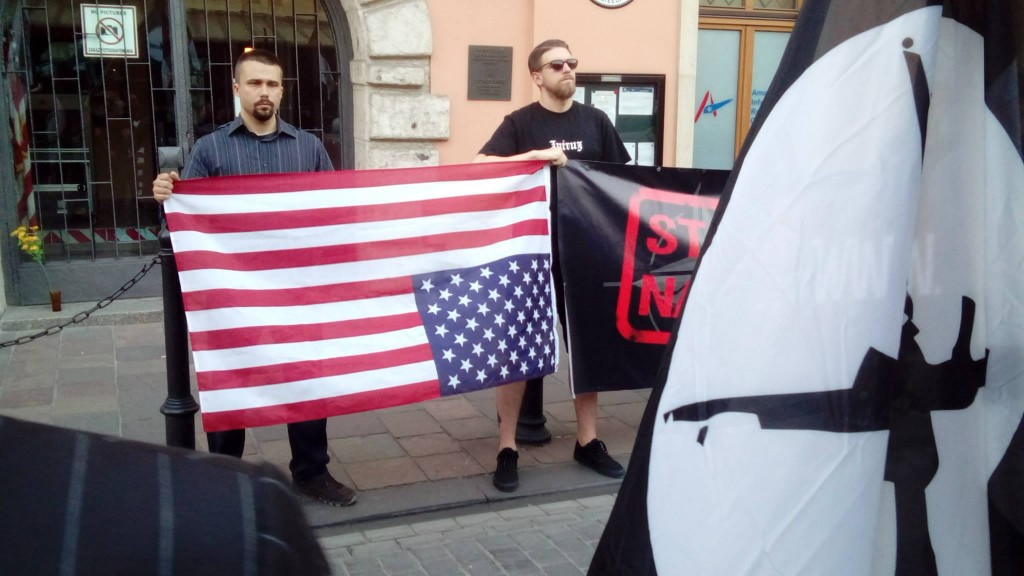
An upside-down American flag

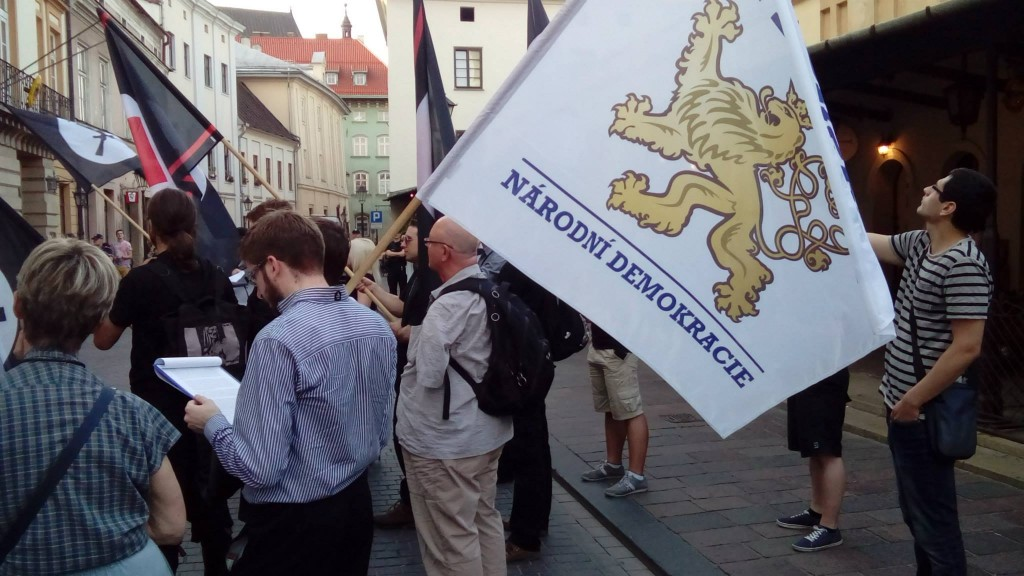
National Democracy and Falanga supporters

Falanga allied itself with the Czech Republic's National Democracy party (ND) on July 4, 2015, participating in a joint conference on Central European issues and an anti-American protest at the US consulate in Krakow. On August 15 of that year, a delegation from Falanga and Xportal.pl participated in anti-liberal and anti-immigrant demonstrations organized by the National Democracy party in Prague.

=== Participation in Anakonda-16 ===
In June 2016, Michał Prokopowicz and the members of Krakow Rifle Unit Association 2039 (who were associated with him and Falanga) participated in the multinational Anakonda-16 NATO exercises. The Ministry of National Defense denied inviting Falanga members to the military manoeuvres. Their participation was announced by Krakow Rifle Unit Association 2039 members, and information about the participation of the "Rifleman" groups appeared on the Ministry of National Defense webpage for NATO exercises. In September 2016, former Foreign Intelligence Agency officer Michał Rybak called the state of affairs a "system error".

=== Attempted Ukrainian arson ===
On February 4, 2018, an attempt was made to set fire to the Hungarian centre in Uzhhorod, Ukraine. The Security Service of Ukraine said at the end of the month that several Falanga members who had acted on orders from the Russian special services were responsible for the arson attempt, and they were arrested by the Internal Security Agency on February 21. On February 24, Bekier denied that Falanga was responsible for the incident.

In January 2019, several former Falanga members were charged with committing a terrorist act by a Kraków court. According to the prosecutor's office, the operation was aimed at "disrupting the system of Ukraine and deepening the ethnic divisions between Ukrainians and Hungarians".

On March 23, 2020, an interim ruling was issued in the case. The Kraków district court of affirmed the position of the prosecutor's office that the crime was a terrorist one, and found all the accused guilty. Arson organizer Michał Prokopowicz was sentenced to three years' imprisonment, and his two accomplices were sentenced to one- and two-year terms. No one appealed, and the judgment became final.

Prokopowicz testified that the terrorist attack was organised and financed by German journalist Manuel Ochsenreiter, whose spokesperson denied the accusation. Ochsenreiter then lost his job with Markus Frohnmaier, an AfD member of the Bundestag. Polish and German law-enforcement agencies unsuccessfully sought him for several years, with reports that he had been in Russia and Morocco. In August 2021, Russian authorities and media announced that Ochsenreiter had died of a heart attack in Moscow.

=== Russian international forum ===
In July 2019, Bekier traveled to Russia for the Second International Forum for the Development of Parliamentarianism. In his appeal to Vladimir Putin and members of the State Duma, Bekier demanded that Poland leave NATO and the EU; the implementation of a Polish-Russian alliance; the partition of Ukraine and the annexation of Lviv to Poland. He also suggested the forced federalization of Lithuania and territorial autonomy for the Vilnius Region.

=== Opposition to Women's Strike ===
In October 2020, during the Women's Strike protesting the tightening of abortion regulations in Poland, an interview with Bekier was posted on Onet.pl. According to Bekier, "about 10,000 nationalists are expected to appear in Warsaw in the first week of November, and 1/3 to half of them are trained in combat tactics". On the evening of October 30, several thousand protesters demonstrated. Thirty-seven people were arrested, 35 of whom had attacked protesters.

== Allies ==
Falanga has cooperated with:

- Hezbollah
- Syrian Social Nationalist Party
- Zmiana
- The Other Russia
- National Democracy (Czech Republic)
- Donetsk People's Republic
- Luhansk People's Republic
- Syria (Syrian Arab Republic)
- Russia
