= Wojciech Olszański =

Polish actor and far-right activist (born 1960)

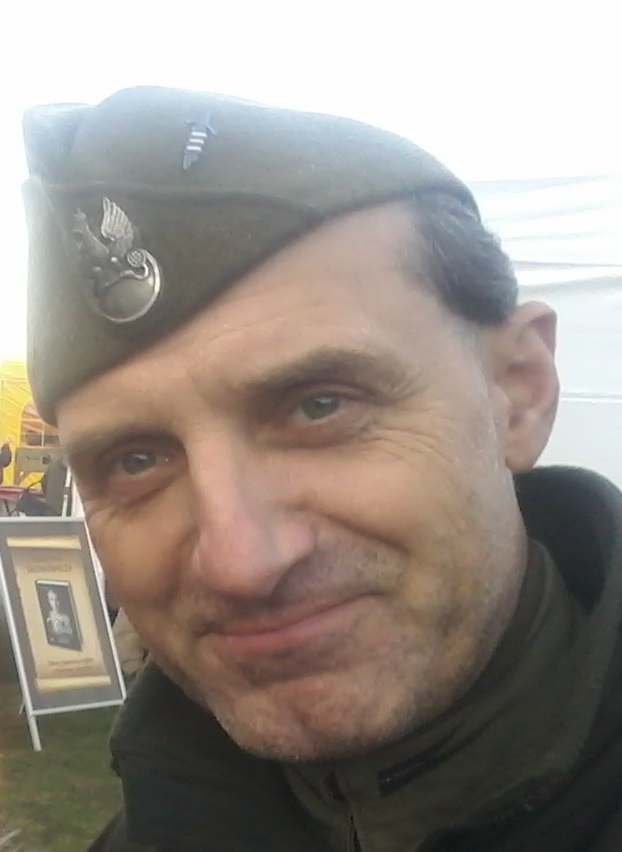
- Olszański in 2016
- Born: 7 July 1960 (age 66); Kłodzko, Poland
- Other name: Aleksander Jabłonowski
- Education: AST National Academy of Theatre Arts in Kraków
- Occupations: Actor and filmmaker
- Years active: 1983–present
- Known for: Extreme political views

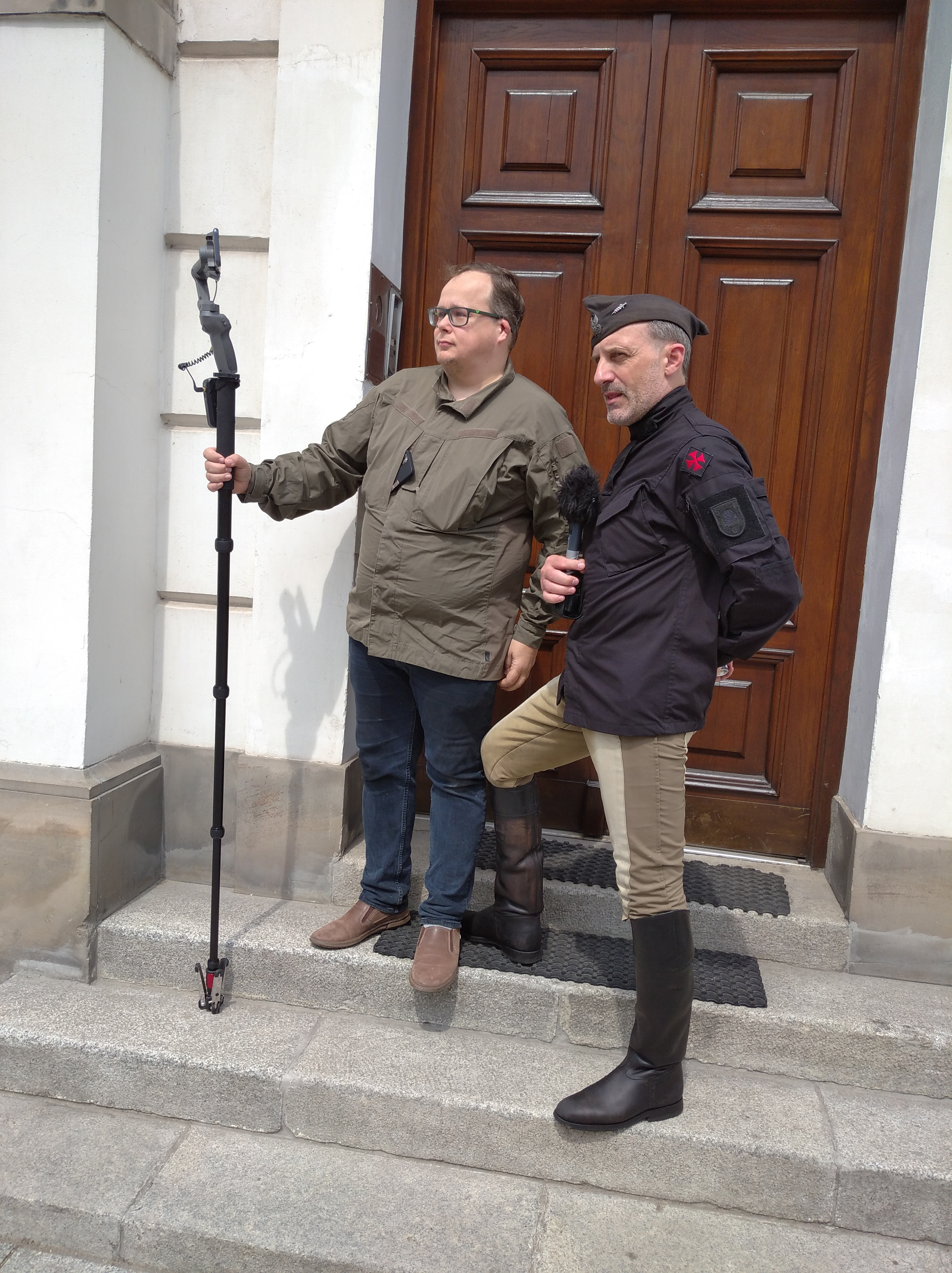
Aleksander Jabłonowski and fellow nationalist Marcin Osadowski

Wojciech Olszański (born 7 July 1960), also known as Aleksander Jabłonowski or Jaszczur (English: "Lizard"), is a Polish nationalist activist, film and theatre actor, filmmaker, livestreamer ("patostreamer" broadcasting so-called trash streams), and the founder of the far-right Rodacy Kamraci movement. He is the stepfather of actress Michalina Olszańska. Olszański has been arrested multiple times, most recently in June 2025.

== Early life and acting career ==
Wojciech Józef Olszański was born on 17 July 1960 in Kłodzko. In 1983, he graduated the AST National Academy of Theatre Arts in Kraków, starting his career as a theatre actor.

He earned an award for his performance in a Jerzy Trela rendition of Vladimir Mayakovsky's The Bedbug in 1983. From 1983 to 1987, he starred in plays at the National Theatre. He later settled into a home life, taking care of his stepdaughter, Michalina Olszańska. After 2000, he starred in supporting roles in various films, including Quo Vadis (2001) and Battle of Warsaw 1920 (2011), alongside participating in historical reenactments.

== Activism ==
Olszański first gained popularity in 2016, when he set up a YouTube channel using the pseudonym Aleksander Jabłonowski. He gained a large following on his channel, Niezależna Polska TV, which was repeatedly restricted by YouTube because of its violent and anti-Semitic content.

Wojciech Olszański also cofounded the "National Polish Front" (Polish: Narodowy Front Polski), which advocated for Polish withdrawal from the European Union and deportation of foreign immigrants, though he was expelled for disobedience in 2017. Later, on 30 August 2023, he cofounded Rodacy Kamraci (English: Compatriot Comrades) and contended in the 2023 Polish parliamentary election, but failed to sign any candidates.

== Political views ==
Olszański personally considers himself a fascist, nationalist, and Stalinist. He supports an alliance with Vladimir Putin-ruled Russia and supports the rule of Alexander Lukashenko in Belarus. He has spread COVID-19 misinformation, stating that the virus is controlled by the United States Army. He believes the United States is Poland's greatest enemy and often attacks the LGBT community. He also advocates for the full legalization of abortion. He is a sedevacantist.

In addition to these views, Olszański believes in national communism, reflecting positively on the Polish People's Republic and praising Ivan Serov and Bolesław Piasecki.

== Controversies ==
Olszański has been the subject of several lawsuits and controversies. He has been sued for, among other things, slapping another man during Warsaw Uprising commemorations in 2017, attacking a Belarusian student with pepper spray in 2021 for participating in pro-democratic movements, burning down a copy of the Statute of Kalisz during an Independence Day parade that same year, and calling for the murder of deputies to the Sejm during an anti-vaccine protest in 2022. On 1 November 2022, he was arrested and sentenced to 6 months of imprisonment. He finished serving the sentence on 30 April 2023 and was promptly freed. However, on 30 August 2022, he had also been sentenced to 2 years in prison and community service by the Warsaw-Mokotów Regional Court, a sentence he is currently serving as of October 2024.

There has been a large amount of debate over the legitimacy of his beliefs, as he was a film and theatre actor in the past. Rafał Pankowski called him a "popular, aggressive supporter of a racist form of pan-Slavism which translates over to his support for Lukashenko's rule in Belarus". In June 2025, Olszański and his close associate Marcin Osadowski were arrested once again after the records of more than 1,500 known incidents were brought up against him, alongside his and his associate's financial dealings.

== Personal life ==
Olszański was married to Aleksandra Fatyga up to her death in 2020. Through her, he is the stepfather of Michalina Olszańska.

In interviews, Michalina has praised her stepfather, stating: "We had a family model that is only now beginning to be respected. Mum worked, dad looked after the home and raised me. He’s a brilliant father." When asked about Wojciech's political views, she replied: "A long time ago, we separated family life from discussions about politics. We came to the conclusion that we have different views and different beliefs; I try to avoid politics anyway. We meet on the ground that unites us: acting and art. That’s enough for us."

== Filmography ==
=== Film ===
Year	Title	Role	Notes
2001	Klątwa skarbu Inków		Uncredited
2001	Quo Vadis	Faon	
2003	Łowcy skór	Piotr Biernacki	
2011	Battle of Warsaw 1920	Mounted Red Army soldier	
