= "Never Again" Association =

Polish organization

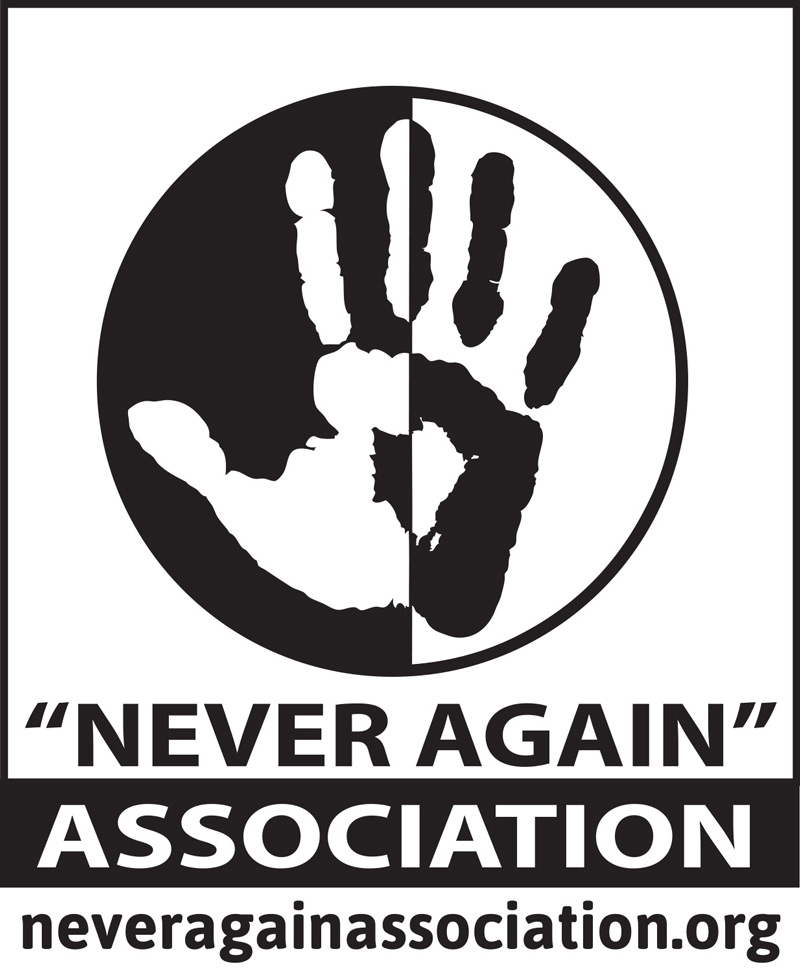
- Founded: 1996; 30 years ago
- Type: Anti-racist organization
- Purpose: Promote multicultural understanding and to contribute to the development of a democratic civil society particularly concerned with the problem of education against racial and ethnic prejudices among the young.
- Location: Warsaw, Poland
- Region served: Poland and broader Central and Eastern Europe
- Key people: Rafał Pankowski
- Website: www.neveragainassociation.org

"Never Again" Association (Polish: Stowarzyszenie "Nigdy Więcej") is a Polish anti-racist organisation, based in Warsaw. The organisation has its roots in an informal youth group that was active since 1992. It was formally founded in 1996 by Marcin Kornak, a social activist, public life commentator, as well as a poet and songwriter who collaborated with independent rock bands. From the age of fifteen, due to an accident, Marcin Kornak lived with a physical disability.

Since Kornak's death in 2014 the organisation is headed by sociologist and political scientist Rafał Pankowski.

The organisation's work scope includes promoting multicultural understanding and contribution to the development of a democratic civil society in Poland and in the broader region of Central and Eastern Europe. "Never Again" is particularly concerned with the problem of education against racial and ethnic prejudices among the young.

"Never Again" is not linked to any political party.

== Objectives ==
The major objectives of the "Never Again" Association include:

- breaking the silence and raising awareness of the problem of racism and xenophobia;
- building a broad and inclusive movement against racism and discrimination, for respect, inclusivity and diversity;
- eliminating or marginalizing racist, xenophobic and antisemitic tendencies in various spheres of life.

The organization's activity has achieved broad national and international recognition. It received endorsements from, among others, Jan Karski, Marek Edelman, Simon Wiesenthal as well as from Barack Obama and Kate Middleton, the Duchess of Cambridge.

== Activities ==
Since 1994 "Never Again" has produced a regular publication in the form of NEVER AGAIN (NIGDY WIECEJ) magazine. The magazine is focused on countering intolerance, fascism, racism and xenophobia, providing information and analysis on hate crime and on extremist and racist groups operating in Poland and in the rest of Europe. Nowadays it publishes articles in the NEVER AGAIN (NIGDY WIECEJ) e-zine.

The organization closely monitors racism and discrimination on the ground and created the most extensive register of racist incidents and other xenophobic crimes committed in Poland, the Brown Book.

"Never Again" provides information directly to journalists and researchers interested in the problem of racism and xenophobia. It has consulted numerous programs on the national and foreign television, among others the BBC, CNN, Euronews, ARTE, as well as assisted in writing a number of articles for the national and international press, such as The Guardian, The New York Times, Le Monde, Die Tageszeitung and Gazeta Wyborcza.

The organization has provided expertise to institutions such as the Parliamentary Committee on Ethnic Minorities as well as consulted and influenced legislation on issues of racism and xenophobia. In 1996, "Never Again" successfully initiated campaign to include a ban on fascist and racist organizations in the Polish Constitution.

"Never Again" has cooperated with international organizations, including the Council of Europe, the United Nations, the European Union, and the Organization for Security and Cooperation in Europe. It has actively participated in international networks, including Football against Racism in Europe (FARE), UNITED for Intercultural Action, the International Network against Cyber Hate (INACH), Helsinki Citizens' Assembly (hCa), and the Anti-fascist Network for Research and Education (Antifanet).

In 1996, "Never Again" organized a campaign with the slogan "Let's Kick Racism out of the Stadiums", imploring the Polish Football Association to act against racism in the sport. In 2012, ahead of UEFA Euro 2012 in Poland and Ukraine, "Never Again" launched one of the most extensive anti-racist campaigns in football, as part of the Fare network of which the organization is a co-founder. Poland's first black international player Emmanuel Olisadebe endorsed their work.

"Never Again" has launched the Delete Racism project to combat racism and antisemitism on the Internet, as well as conducted high-profile educational campaigns in the field of popular culture such as Music Against Racism.

Among the activities of the organization is promoting diversity and respect in cooperation with prison personnel and inmates. Since the mid-1990s, "Never Again", as the first organization in Poland, has offered non-material support to individuals who desire to leave far-right circles.

In 2018, after over a decade of lobbying, "Never Again" convinced the e-commerce site Allegro to halt sales of items bearing Nazi symbols. A team of "Never Again" volunteers reported sales of over 1,000 such auctions to Allegro which then took them down. While such items are illegal in Poland and prohibited by Allegro's terms of use, prior to "Never Again's" activities the sale of such items on Allegro were widespread. Since 2021 "Never Again" and OLX, Poland's largest ad platform, have partnered together to monitor and delete sales of racist, fascist and antisemitic propaganda items.

Through event partnership, the organization supports and promotes initiatives that are in line with its mission, profile, and activity scope.

The organization supports and promotes through event partnership, the initiatives, which are in line with its mission, profile and sphere of activities. "Never Again" also participate in commemoration of the Holocaust and in combating Holocaust denial.

== See also ==
- Never again
