= Marian Curyło =

Polish politician

Marian Curyło is a Polish politician. Member of Polish Parliament (Sejm) from Tarnów district from 2001 - 2005 for Self Defence party (Samoobrona).

Born in Tarnów in 1955, small businessman until voted to parliament He left Samoobrona in 2005 and joined Samoobrona Ruch Społeczny, later to become the Polish Labour Party (PPP).
