= Rafał Pankowski =

Polish sociologist and political scientist

Rafał Pankowski is a Polish sociologist and political scientist. Pankowski is a Phd and associate professor at Collegium Civitas, as well as the head of "Never Again" Association's East Europe Monitoring Center. He is also the deputy editor of the Association's magazine Nigdy Wiecej. He is also involved in monitoring football hooliganism as part of UEFA's Fare network.

Pankowski's area of expertise include right-wing extremism and nationalism in Poland. He has offered commentary on topics like radical and far right, racism, hate speech, and extremism.

In 2018, he was a visiting professor at the Centre for European Studies of Chulalongkorn University in Bangkok, Thailand.

== Biography ==
Pankowski studied economy, politics, and philosophy at Oxford University as an undergraduate. He received an MA in Political Science from Warsaw University, where he went on to receive his PhD, as well as subsequent habilitation, in the sociology of culture.

== Research ==
In 2010, Pankowski published The populist radical right in Poland: the patriots, covering the far-right in Poland. Accepting Cas Mudde's definition of populism in The Popular Zeitgeist: "populism is an ideology which states that society splits up into two antagonistic groups- the rotten elite and the pure masses. Populists think that politics should represent the general will of the people", as a starting point, Pankowski elaborates on the differentiation of populist movements that are successful. Pankowski states that "populist movements were successful where they chimed effectively with the common-sense everyday culture". In Poland, this means relating to Catholicism.

In July 2018 he published a study in Israel Journal of Foreign Affairs, titled "The Resurgence of Antisemitic Discourse in Poland". In the study, Pankowski describes a "disturbing revival of antisemitism" in Poland following the passage of the Holocaust law that criminalized stating that the Polish state or nation was complicit in the Holocaust. The study states that the surge of antisemitic discourse in Poland took observers by surprise as relations between Poland and Israel were fruitful and cordial for many years. According to the study, while antisemitic discourse had been confined in the past to extreme media, at present such discourse is present in Polish mainstream media and in particular in state-controlled media. According to Pankowski prior to the Holocaust law "Muslims and foreigners had replaced Jews for many years as the main target for xenophobic hate", however in the aftermath of the law hate discourse reverted to traditional Jew hatred.

== Anti-racism activist ==
In 1996, Pankowski was one of the founders of the "Never Again" Association (Stowarzyszenie "Nigdy Więcej").

In 2012, ahead of UEFA Euro 2012, Never Again launched one of the most extensive anti-racist campaigns in football. However, in 2016, Pankowski said that "unfortunately the Polish FA has hindered rather than helped the work". According to Pankowski, most fan groups in Poland exhibit an Islamophobic and anti-refugee attitudes, which are reinforced by the conservative political climate in Poland.

In a 2014 interview with Polygon, Pankowski analyzed the political associations of the development team of the Hatred video game, which according to Pankowski shows many connections to the radical right which are troubling.

In 2017, in the Parliament of Poland, Pankowski condemned the sale of "lucky Jew" figurines depicting Jews with money, as "deeply rooted in negative stereotypes". Following Pankowski's condemnation, the figurines were removed from sale.

In 2018, Never Again convinced the Allegro website to halt sales of items bearing Nazi symbols, which Never Again reported to Allegro. According to Pankowski: "We can see that in our society and companies like Allegro there is a growing need to do something about the problem".

On November 11, 2021, the Polish far-right nationalists at a rally in Kalisz attended by hundreds of people yelled "Death to Jews." They then burned a red-covered book meant to symbolize the 1264 Statute of Kalisz historic pact protecting Poland's Jewish rights, on Poland's Independence Day. The rally organizer said: “LGBT, pederasts and Zionists are the enemies of Poland.” Pankowski said it reminded him of Nazi book burnings, and observed: "Having monitored antisemitism for more than 25 years, I have never seen anything like that."

== Awards and recognition ==
In 2017, he was awarded the Polish Ombudsman honorary badge. He also received the Polcul award for "pedagogical, journalistic and cultural activities for racial, ethnic and religious tolerance, as well as for building civil society and democracy in Poland".

He was featured in Algemeiner Journal's 2018 J100 list, a "list of the top one hundred individuals who have positively influenced Jewish life".

In 2019, he was awarded the Paul Ehrlich-Gunther K. Schwerin humans rights award by the Anti-Defamation League. The award honors people who fight antisemitism in Europe. He was selected to receive a 2024-2025 Rotary Peace Fellowship to study Peace and Conflict Transformation at Makerere University in Kampala, Uganda.
