= Allegro (website) =

Polish auction website

Allegro.com S.A.
- Company type: Joint-stock company
- Website type: e-commerce platform
- Traded as: WSE: ALE; WIG30 component
- Founded: Poznań, Poland (1999)
- Headquarters: Poznań, Poland
- Area served: Poland, Czech Republic, Slovakia, Hungary, Croatia, Slovenia
- Owners: Cinven, Permira, Mid Europa Partners
- Key people: Roy Perticucci President of the Management Board
- Industry: Electronic commerce, Auctions
- Products: Online auction hosting, Online payment systems, Price comparison service, Online classified adverts
- Revenue: US$3.0 billion (2025)
- Operating income: US$870 million (2025)
- Website: allegro.pl
- Registration: required to buy and sell

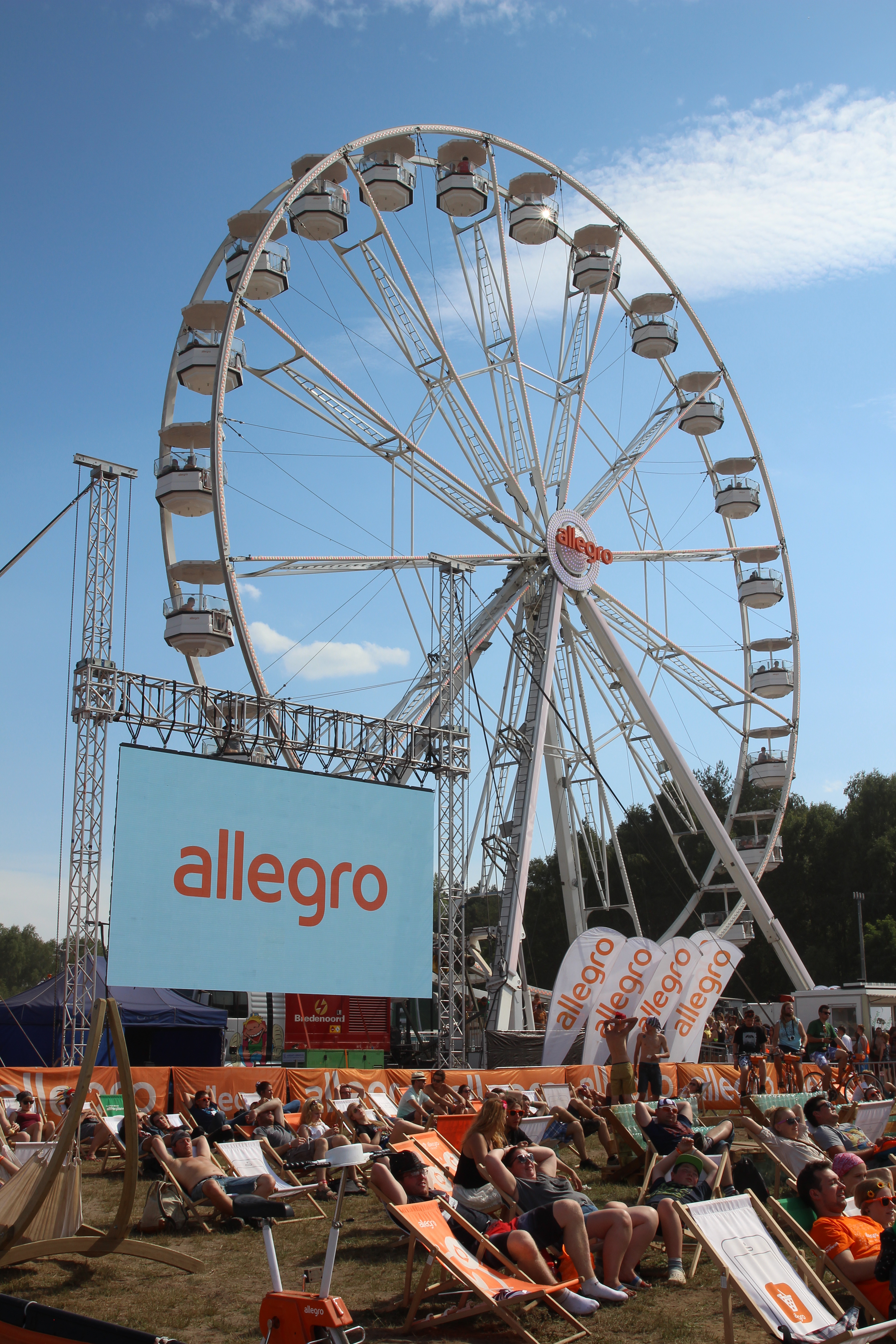
Allegro zone at Woodstock Festival Poland (2015).

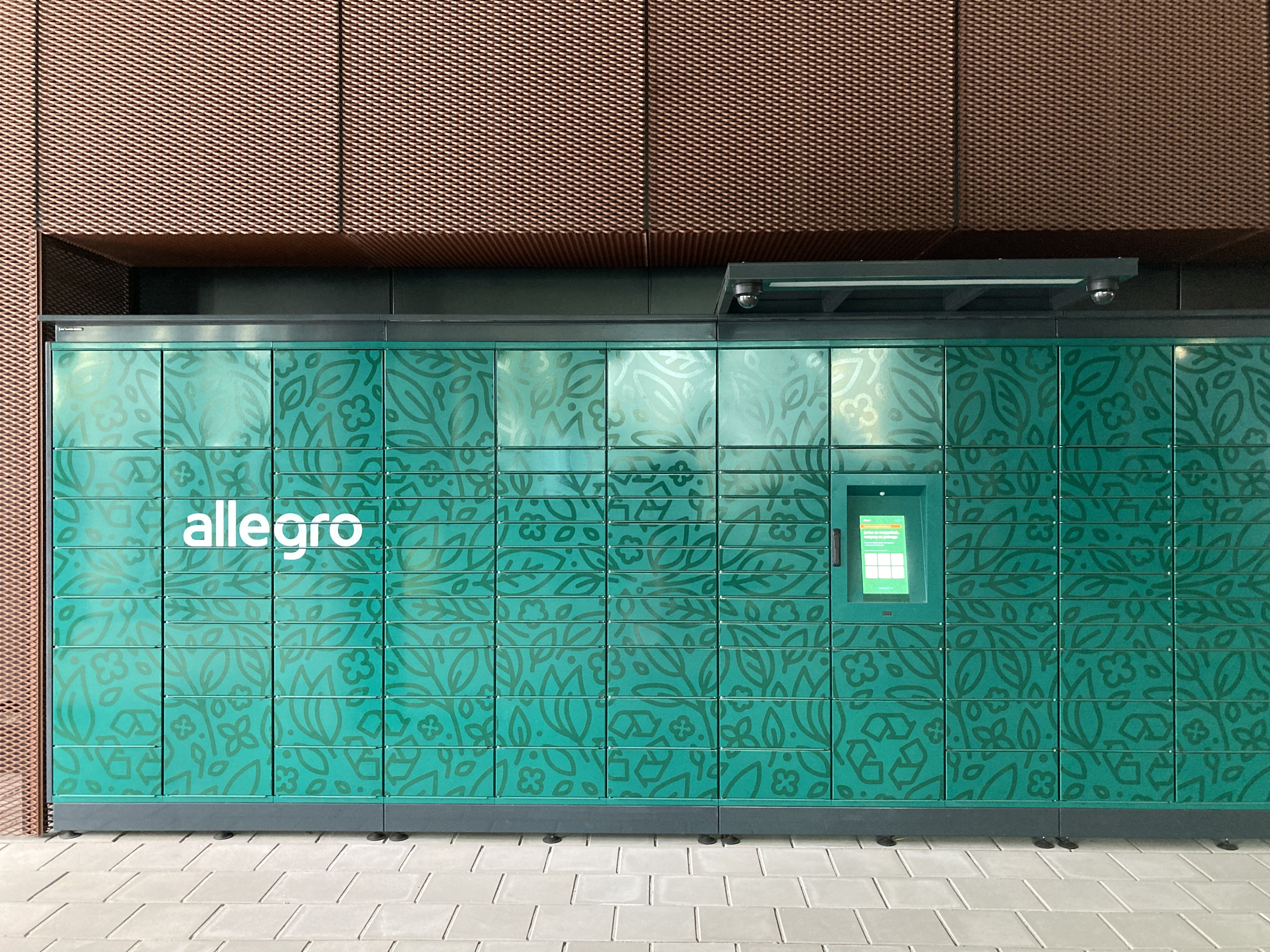
Allegro parcel locker in Poznań (2021).

Allegro (Polish pronunciation: [aˈlɛɡrɔ]) is a Polish online marketplace and e-commerce platform headquartered in Poznań. It is the largest e-commerce platform in Poland and operates marketplaces in Poland, the Czech Republic, Slovakia and Hungary. The platform is operated by Allegro sp. z o.o., while its parent company, Allegro.eu S.A., is incorporated in Luxembourg and listed on the Warsaw Stock Exchange.

Founded in Poznań in 1999 as an online auction website, Allegro developed into Poland's leading online marketplace. After a series of ownership changes, Naspers sold the business in 2016 to a private-equity consortium for US$3.25 billion. Allegro debuted on the Warsaw Stock Exchange in October 2020. In 2022, it acquired Mall Group and logistics company WE|DO, accelerating its expansion into Central Europe.

== History ==
Allegro was founded in Poznań in 1999 as an online auction website. It became part of British online auction company QXL Ricardo, which was renamed Tradus plc in 2007. Tradus was acquired by South African media group Naspers in 2008.

In 2016, Naspers sold Allegro to a consortium of investment funds advised by Cinven, Permira and Mid Europa Partners. Allegro was listed on the Warsaw Stock Exchange in October 2020 in what was then the largest initial public offering in Poland's history.

In April 2022, Allegro completed the acquisition of Mall Group and logistics company WE|DO, its first major international acquisition. Allegro subsequently launched its marketplace in the Czech Republic in May 2023, Slovakia in February 2024 and Hungary in October 2024.

Allegro then restructured Mall Group, closing the legacy Mall online stores in the Czech Republic, Slovakia and Hungary in 2025.

In 2026, it sold its Slovenian and Croatian operations, including Mimovrste in Slovenia and Mall.hr in Croatia, to German investment company Mutares, completing the restructuring of the former Mall Group.

== Operations ==
According to company data, about 1.47 billion items were sold through Allegro Group's platforms in 2025 and the group's gross merchandise value (GMV) was PLN 69.2 billion.

== 2016 Christmas ad ==
Allegro's 3 minute 2016 Christmas advertisement featured an elderly Polish man teaching himself English in order to communicate with the granddaughter he is about to meet for the first time when he visits his son in London for Christmas. It was highly praised on social media and has been viewed over 20 million times on YouTube.

== Against racism ==
Since 2018 Allegro has cooperated with the Polish anti-racist organization the "Never Again" Association to remove auctions of newly manufactured items with racist, fascist and Nazi content. In 2018-2019 more than 3500 items with fascist and antisemitic content were removed through this cooperation. These included numerous copies of contemporary editions of Hitler's "Mein Kampf" without critical commentary as well as books by David Irving, Leon Degrelle and Hennecke Kardel. The items offered for sale reported by "Never Again" included also newly made Third Reich flags and SS uniforms, signet rings and badges with Nazi swastikas, contemporary imitations of Nazi military decorations, records with Nazi music, lighters with an image of Hitler, or pendants with Mussolini.

== See also ==
- List of online marketplaces
- List of companies of Poland
