= Przemysław Witkowski =

- Born: Przemysław Andrzej Witkowski; 17 January 1982 (age 44); Wrocław, Poland
- Education: University of Wrocław
- Occupations: Political scientist, journalist, publicist, poet, academic
- Writing career
- Language: Polish
- Genres: Poetry, essay
- Notable awards: Winner of the 15th Jacek Bierezin National Poetry Competition

Przemysław Andrzej Witkowski (born 17 January 1982 in Wrocław) is a Polish political scientist, journalist, publicist and poet, a graduate in international relations from the University of Wrocław, a doctor of humanities in the field of political science, an academic teacher, in 2024 an advisor to Minister Bartłomiej Sienkiewicz in the political cabinet of the Minister of Culture and National Heritage, and since mid-2024 deputy director of the Gabriel Narutowicz Institute of Political Thought.

== Biography ==
=== Lectures ===
He has lectured at the Institute of International Studies at the University of Wrocław, the General Tadeusz Kościuszko Military University of Land Forces, the Helena Chodkowska University of Technology and Commerce, the University of Lower Silesia in Wrocław and the Institute of Journalism and Social Communication. He has also given lectures at Adam Mickiewicz University in Poznań and Jagiellonian University in Kraków. He currently teaches at the Institute of Polish Culture of the University of Warsaw and Collegium Civitas in Warsaw, where he holds the position of assistant professor at the Institute of Political Science and International Relations.

=== Research ===
Witkowski has received PhD in political science and was a recipient of awarded scholarships by the Ministry of National Education twice, in 2005 and 2006. In 2011, he defended his doctoral thesis at the University of Wrocław entitled Lewica radykalna w Polsce, Republice Federalnej Niemiec i Zjednoczonym Królestwie Wielkiej Brytanii wobec Unii Europejskiej w latach 1992–2009 (The Radical Left in Poland, the Federal Republic of Germany and the United Kingdom of Great Britain and Northern Ireland towards the European Union in the years 1992–2009), prepared under the supervision of Elżbieta Stadtmüller.

He is a specialist in radical movements and groups, both left-wing and right-wing, including those of a mixed character. He also deals with the connections between ideology and popular culture in film, television series, comics and popular music, with particular emphasis on political propaganda, especially Polish, as well as issues of ethnic and religious minorities in Poland and the region, and their political significance.

He collaborates with the American think tank Counter Extremism Project and the Dutch International Centre for Counter-Terrorism, and is an expert of the Radicalisation Awareness Network initiative operating under the European Commission.

=== Publicistics ===
He has published in newspapers and magazines such as Polityka, Krytyka Polityczna, Przegląd, Trybuna, Bez Dogmatu, Gazeta Wyborcza, Przekrój, Odra, Vice, Dialog, Polska The Times, as well as in the Polish edition of Le Monde diplomatique and the portal OKO.press, and also in Visegrad Insight and Prosa. He is a member of the team of Krytyka Polityczna.

In his journalistic and academic activities, Przemysław Witkowski deals with the criticism of fascism and the contemporary far right. He is the author of the book Faszyzm, który nadchodzi (2023), in which he analyses contemporary forms of fascism and indicates ways of counteracting their development.

=== Literary work ===
He has published poems in magazines such as Twórczość, Tygodnik Powszechny, Gazeta Wyborcza, Odra, Wakat, Kresy, Akcent, Tygiel Kultury, Pogranicza, Topos and Portret. He co-edited the Lower Silesian young poetry anthology Ziemie uzyskane. He translated texts by PJ Harvey for the musical performance Route 67/Jeśli tylko tyle jest by the duo Justyna Wasilewska/Thomas Harzem, which was staged during the 31st Przegląd Piosenki Aktorskiej. In the years 2008–2016 he edited the “young literature” section of the monthly Odra (8. Arkusz Odry). In the years 2008–2016 he organised the Microfestival of New Polish Literature in Wrocław. He has performed at the largest Polish poetry festivals such as Port Literacki Wrocław, Manifestacje Poetyckie, Poznań Poetów and at the Szczecin theatre festival Kontrapunkt. His poems have been translated into Slovak, English, French, Ukrainian, Serbian, Hungarian and Czech.

== Personal life ==
He is the son of the ichthyologist Professor Andrzej Witkowski and the immunologist Professor Danuta Witkowska, and the brother of the biotechnologist Professor Anna Dąbrowska. In 2009 he entered into a humanist marriage with the poet Ilona Jakubowska, with the ceremony under the patronage of the Polish Association of Rationalists. They divorced in 2015. He lives in Wrocław and Warsaw.

On 25 July 2019 he was beaten in Wrocław near the Trzebnickie Bridges for opposing homophobic, hateful slogans. The perpetrator, who was arrested a few days later, broke his cheekbone and nose. In November 2019 the court sentenced Maciej K. for the assault on Witkowski to one year of absolute imprisonment and a fine of 5,000 złoty.

== Publications ==
=== Poetry ===
- Lekkie czasy ciężkich chorób – Biuro Literackie, Wrocław 2009
- Preparaty – Biuro Literackie, Wrocław 2010
- D’une ville l’autre/Z miasta w miasto, nuit myrtide, Lille 2013 (together with Dimitri Vazemsky)
- Taniec i Akwizycja – Warstwy, Wrocław 2017

=== Essays ===
- Chwała supermanom. Ideologia a popkultura – Książka i Prasa, Warsaw 2017

=== Academic monographs ===
- Laboratorium przemocy. Polityczna historia Romów – Książka i Prasa, Warsaw 2020, ISBN 978-83-66615-72-4
- The Polish Independence March as a Contact Hub and a Model for European Extremism – Counter Extremism Project, New York – Berlin 2023
- Śmierć Wrogom Ojczyzny. Anatomia polityczna uczestników Marszu Niepodległości – Książka i Prasa, Warsaw 2023, ISBN 978-83-66615-32-8 (volume editor)
- Szpryca i Czipowanie. Polityczny wymiar ruchów sprzeciwu wobec obowiązku szczepień i sieci telefonii piątej generacji – Książka i Prasa, Warsaw 2024
- Obywatel Michnik. Myśl polityczna Adama Michnika – Gabriel Narutowicz Institute of Political Thought and Książka i Prasa, Warsaw, 2025, ISBN 978-83-976610-1-1 (with Michał Siermiński)
- Ideologia, której nie było. Kto starszy w Polsce „Gender” – Gabriel Narutowicz Institute of Political Thought and Książka i Prasa, Warsaw, 2025, ISBN 978-83-973888-9-5 (volume editor with Dominik Puchała)
- Pro-Russian Organizations in Poland after 1986. Agents of Chaos – Routledge, New York, 2026
- Narratives, Political Representation, and Extremism in Polish Anti-Science Movements "Plandemic," "Depopulation," and "The Free People" – Brill, Leiden, 2026

=== Collections of interviews ===
- Faszyzm, który nadchodzi – Książka i Prasa, Warsaw 2023
- The Upcoming Fascism – Książka i Prasa, Warsaw 2024, ISBN 978-83-66615-21-2

=== Publicistics ===
- Partia rosyjska – Arbitror, Warsaw 2023, ISBN 978-83-66095-49-6

== Awards and distinctions ==
- 2nd place in the competition of the Polish Writers' Association in Wrocław (2007)
- finalist of the 14th Jacek Bierezin National Poetry Competition (2008)
- winner of the 15th Jacek Bierezin National Poetry Competition (2009)
- nominated for the cultural award of Gazeta Wyborcza wARTo in the field of literature for the chapbook Lekkie czasy ciężkich chorób (2009)
- nominated and finalist of the Biuro Literackie project Połów 2009
- nominated for the cultural award of Gazeta Wyborcza wARTo in the field of literature for the Microfestival (2015)
- Chwała supermanom. Ideologia a popkultura – Left-wing Book of the Year 2017
- nominated for the cultural award of Gazeta Wyborcza wARTo in the field of literature for the essay book Chwała supermanom. Ideologia a popkultura (2018)
