= Roman Dmowski's National Party =

Roman Dmowski's National Party Stronnictwo Narodowe im. Dmowskiego Romana
- Abbreviation: SND; SNDR
- President: Ludwik Wasiak
- Secretary: Sebastian Janasik
- Vice president: Bogdan Tomaszewski
- Founded: 28 December 2004
- Registered: 13 April 2005
- Preceded by: National Party
- Headquarters: 95-035 Ozorków, Łódź; Nowy Rynek 17
- Ideology: National Democracy; National conservatism Ultranationalism
- Political position: Far-right
- Religion: Roman Catholic
- National affiliation: KWW "God Bless You!" of Grzegorz Braun (2015); United Beyond Boundaries (2022); Rodacy Kamraci (2024)
- Colours: Gold
- Slogan: Poland for Poles! (Polish: Polska dla Polaków)
- Sejm: 0 / 460
- Senate: 0 / 100
- European Parliament: 0 / 51
- Regional assemblies: 0 / 552
- City presidents: 0 / 117

Website
- stronnictwonarodowe.com
- Politics of Poland; Political parties; Elections; a: Described as far-right, although its political environment is considered nationalist-socialist, and national communist. It is considered a representative of the "pink endecja".

Roman Dmowski's National Party (Polish: Stronnictwo Narodowe im. Dmowskiego Romana, alternatively Stronnictwo Narodowe im. Romana Dmowskiego, SND or SNDR) is an ultranationalist Polish political party that refers to the legacy of Roman Dmowski and his ideology, National Democracy. The party was founded on 28 December 2004 and registered on 13 April 2005. It was founded by a self-styled General Ludwik Wasiak. Roman Dmowski's National Party refers to itself as "the only uniformed party in Poland", and is considered a paramilitary organization, as its members wear uniforms styled after the interwar National Party.

Known for its military outfit composed of light-brown uniform, black berets, and golden gorgets, the party espouses strongly pro-Russian and anti-Ukrainian views; it supported the 2014 Russian annexation of Crimea and the Russian Federation in the Russo-Ukrainian War, proposing a partition of Ukraine. Described as far-right and ultranationalist, it is also considered to represent the post-communist, "pink faction" of Endecja that collaborated with the communist government and focuses on radical economies policies. It claims to fight the Masonic and Jewish influences in Poland, in favor of Dmowski's ideal of a Polish ethnostate.

== History ==
=== Foundation ===
Roman Dmowski's National Party was founded by Ludwik Wasiak, Bogdan Tomaszewski, and Bronisław Wolf on 28 December 2004, and was registered on 13 April 2005. Wasiak became the president of the party. Prior to founding the Roman Dmowski's National Party, Wasiak was a member of the National Party formed in 1989. In October 2000, Wasiak founded the first local branch of the National Party in Ozorków, which then expanded into a regional branch by February 2001. Speaking of his decision to join the party, Wasiak stated that he had a dream in 2000 in which Holy Mary told him that he does not care about Poland enough; Wasiak was then to find out about the National Party when given the party's leaflet by Bolesław Matera in Łódź.

In May 2001, the National Party was dissolved and merged into League of Polish Families. Wasiak refused to accept the party's dissolution; he got involved in paramilitary activity, and on 19 July 2001 in Łódź, Wasiak registered the Polish Rifle Squads together with Krzysztof Szpakowski; the organization was based on the pre-WW1 Polish Rifle Squads. In late 2001, together with a group of fellow former National Party activists, he formed the National Party "Patria", which was registered in 2003 in Warsaw. Wasiak was elected the party's vice president, and Norbert Tomczyk became the party's president. However, in the next party congress in 2004, Bohdan Poręba, a prominent member of the Endocommunist Patriotic Union Grunwald, was elected as the new party president; in reaction, Wasiak left the party to found his own.

The party made sand-coloured uniforms, "which the late Leader Roman Dmowski adored", its trademark, worn by all members. The uniform were recreated by the party's vice-president Bogdan Tomaszewski, as well as Zbigniew Skatulski and Bolesław Matera. In October 2006, the party marched in support of the PiS-Samoobrona-LPR coalition, declaring that it needs to be defended against the "mafia" led by "globalist Donald Tusk".

On 10 November 2006, the party participated in the unveiling ceremony of Roman Dmowski's Monument in Warsaw, the Crossroads Square. Other parties that participated were the Polish National Party, League of Polish Families, National People's Movement, National Rebirth of Poland, National Radical Camp, and the All-Polish Youth. During the ceremony, a fight emerged between the participants and activists of the Federation of Young Social Democrats, who were demonstrating against the monument. The next day, the monument was vandalized by having pink paint spilled on it. Around 30 people from anarchist groups and Young Socialists organized a "Dmowski must fall" picket near the monument. Roman Dmowski's National Party organized a counter-protest, lying flowers at the monument and chanting "Poland for Poles".

=== Electoral attempts ===
In 2009, party's representatives regularly flied to Uruguay to attend and give conferences organized by the Union of Polish Associations and Organisations in Latin America (USOPAŁ), an organization led by Jan Kobylański, a Polish antisemitic and nationalist millionaire who lived in Montevideo. Wasiak gave a total of eight lectures for USOPAŁ, including one titled "Jewish tactics for ruling over Poland". Later that year, Polish media alleged that Kobylański was a szmalcownik during World War II and handed over a Jewish family to the Gestapo, but a state investigation found that the allegation had no evidence. Kobylański sued several journalists who propagated the claim, and Roman Dmowski's National Party defended Kobylański, condemning "a concerted attack by Jewish forces on the good name of the greatest Pole, the first Pole after John Paul II".

In December 2009, Roman Dmowski's National Party signed a cooperation agreement with the Sovereignty Defence League (Polish: Liga Obrony Suwerenności), a party founded in 2002. The cooperation agreement was signed in Gdańsk by Robert Kownacki, the secretary of the Sovereignty Defence League's executive committee, and Ludwik Wasiak. In 2009, Wasiak also became a member of the Covenant of the Polish Nation (Polish: Przymierze Narodu Polskiego), a short-lived party led by Ryszard Kozłowski. It dissolved in 2013.

In 2010, in reaction to the Smoleńsk air disaster, the party claimed that the plane crash was an assassination, and agitated for this theory in Krakowskie Przedmieście. The party was said to have set up a "mini recording studio" in Krakowskie Przedmieście, and posted recordings of party members interviewing bypassers and asking them if they believe that the Smoleńsk plane crash was orchestrated. Journalists Grzegorz Rzeczkowski and Paweł Wroński argue that party's actions made the narrative of Smoleńsk being an assassiation "blow out of proportions".

The party wanted to participate in the 2010 Polish presidential election by fielding Wasiak as its candidate; Wasiak registered his own electoral committee. Wasiak's campaign has been described as harshly antisemitic, as Wasiak stated during the campaign: "The incompetent Jewish minorities must come forward and must leave! This is Poland for Poles!" During the campaign, the party also reconciled with Bohdan Poręba, who approved of Wasiak's candidacy and echoed his sentiments, glorifying the antisemitic communist antisemitic purge of March 1968. Wasiak was endorsed for president by Jan Kobylański; he also gained the support of the Covenant of the Polish Nation of which he was a member of, and gave a speech on its Party Congress in Kraków, on 1 May 2010. Wasiak's slogan for the 2010 presidential election was "The Jewish minority must go!" He also became known for his greeting, "Cheers to great Poland!" (Polish: Czołem wielkiej Polsce!).

While by May Wasiak had collected over 50,000 signatures, but was unable to gather the 100,000 signatures needed to appear to on the ballot. As Wasiak tried to gather signatures for his candidacy, Adam Michnik, the editor-in-chief of Gazeta Wyborcza, reportedly stated that Wasiak "likes to parade in a brown uniform", alleging that the members of the party look like "Nazi militias — perhaps not the SS, but at least the SA from the late 1920s and early 1930s". When the party sued Michnik for his comments, Michnik stated that the party's uniforms are "a bit different". Wasiak described his failure to gather enough signatures as "a victory for Judeo-Masonry.

In the 2011 Polish parliamentary election, the party registered an electoral committee for the Sejm. However, it fielded no candidates for the Senate. The party also tried to participate in the 2014 Polish local elections, and then in the 2015 Polish presidential election and the 2015 Polish parliamentary election. However, it was unable to gather media attention, and its conferences resulted in empty chairs and no journalists. Wasiak concluded that this party was "being blocked by the media". Referring to the 2015 presidential and parliamentary elections, Roman Dmowski's National Party declared that it values Kukiz'15, but that Paweł Kukiz's anti-Russian sentiment undermines his political talent.

In the 2015 Polish parliamentary election, party members ran for the Sejm on the electoral list of Committee of Grzegorz Braun "God Bless You!". The committee secured 0.09% of the vote nationwide (coming 13th).

=== Later activity ===
In 2014, the party enthusiastically supported the Russian Federation in the Russo-Ukrainian war, and declared support for "the policy of Vladimir Vladimirovich Putin, President of the Russian Federation, who, in the wake of the international intervention by the usurers on the Maidan and the armed seizure of power in Ukraine by the Bandera battalions, could not have reacted otherwise". Roman Dmowski's National Party called for a partition of Ukraine, and advocated Polish annexation of the Ukrainian part of Kresy Wschodnie. The party supported the 2014 Russian annexation of Crimea, and was said to participate in anti-Ukrainian demonstrations organized by Konstantin Malofeev. It also joined protesting farmers across the country, where Wasiak argued: "Michnik-Szechter [signifying the Jews] is sending weapons to Ukraine, and we need to maintain good relations with Russia".

On 11 November 2015, the Polish Independence Day, the party organized a ceremony at Roman Dmowski's Monument in Warsaw; the newly elected President Andrzej Duda also arrived to lay flowers at the monument. He greeted party members and bowed before the party's banner held by Wasiak. This was considered a surprise by the media, considering the party's support for Vladimir Putin and the Russian annexation of Crimea. According to Polityka, ever since, Dmowski's monument became the party's meeting point:

The monument in the capital’s most prestigious district has become a ‘home’ for activists from the National Party, led by Wasiak and Sendecki. And this is literally the case – they meet there, hang out, celebrate Mass, sing, discuss, invite guests (including the Russian ambassador) and sometimes even have picnics with roast piglet delivered by former Self-Defence of the Republic of Poland MP Zbigniew Witaszek. The nationalists not only remember that it is thanks to the “venerator of the Sanation”, i.e. President Kaczyński, that the monument was erected in the capital, but also that it was consecrated by Monsignor Henryk Jankowski, another of the heroes of this milieu. Walczak was also closely associated with him, even serving as president of his institute.

After the 2016 American presidential election, the party expressed support for American president Donald Trump, arguing that Jews "control global finance" and that they "hope that President Trump will put them in their place".

On 11 November 2016, the party once again held a ceremony at Roman Dmowski's Monument. The party became a media sensation when Wasiak paid tribute to Jarosław Kaczyński, the leader of Law and Justice, who came to lie flowers at the monument. Wasiak hailed Kaczyński, calling him the "Chief of State" (Polish: Naczelnik), rank reserved only for Józef Piłsudski. He also called Kaczyński the "uncrowned king of Polish politics". Kaczyński was amused by the situation, and the video of his encounter with Wasiak and his party's delegation went viral. The pro-Russian Slavic Union also participated in National Party's initiative. Interviewed by journalists, Wasiak stated that he wished to express his great admiration for Kaczyński, explaining that he supports the United Right government: "PiS has put a stop to the dismantling of the Polish state. What PiS is doing right now is exactly what my Roman Dmowski's National Party would be doing if it were in power." Wasiak was then approached by PiS leadership and congratulated for a "great initiative".

In 2017, the party wrote a request for pardon for Mateusz Piskorski, a former MP of Samoobrona and the leader of Zmiana, who was imprisoned on suspicion of espionage for Russian, Chinese, and Iranian intelligence. The request was rejected. The party attempted to run in the 2018 Polish local elections together with the Slavic Union and the Polish National Front (of Wojciech Olszański).

=== 2020s ===
Since 2020, the party has been increasingly associated with Olszański and his Rodacy Kamraci movement. Roman Dmowski's National Party defended Olszański from media attacks, accusing Polish media of "displaying a profound misunderstanding of Dmowski’s stance towards Russia" and dismissing Olszański, who "follows Dmowski", in a scathing manner. In late 2021, Roman Dmowski's National Party together with Piotr Rybak and Rodacy Kamraci tried to carry a bust of Dmowski made by sculptor Bartłomiej Kurzeja into the Royal Castle in Warsaw, but the museum's staff refused to allow it.

In 2022, the party became a member of the joint committee led by and named after United Beyond Boundaries, which was supposed to contest the 2023 Polish parliamentary election. In response to the Russian invasion of Ukraine in 2022, Roman Dmowski's National Party organized a protest outside the Ukrainian embassy in Warsaw, voicing their opposition to the "import" of Ukrainian refugees, stating that Ukrainians are not refugees but rather "parasites" that would take jobs and housing away from Poles. The party also declared: |It is very good that the Russian Federation’s army and the leaders of the Russian Federation (...) have launched a counter-attack, because the encirclement of the Russian Federation and indeed of all free nations must come to an end." In response, MP Jan Strzeżek accused party activists of being "Russian agents" and filed a police report alleging that the party representatives committed a criminal offence by praising the war.

In January 2023, the party participated in an anti-war demonstration "It's Not Our War" (Polish: To Nie Nasza Wojna). During the event, the party's long-time vice president Eugeniusz Sendecki called for Poland to enter the war on the side of Russia. The party published a response in which it condemned Sendecki's statement, clarifying that it does not want to engage Poland in any military conflicts. On 12 July 2023, the party announced the dismissal of Eugeniusz Sendecki from the position of vice president.

On 10 March 2023, the party met with the representatives of There is One Poland, including its leader, Rafał Piech, in order to organize a joint movement that would be open to integrating with other parties in an attempt to participate in the 2023 Polish parliamentary election. In June 2023, Roman Dmowski's National Party set up a camp around Dmowski's monument, pitching tents and hanging up banners with slogans such as “Dmowski’s March on the Castle”, “National Television”, “The Cross from Giewont stands behind Dmowski”. The party also assembled tall structure from poles meant to recreate the Giewont Cross which towers over Zakopane.

Ultimately, the United Beyond Boundaries coalition did not run in the 2023 election. Wasiak became the chairman of one of the polling station electoral committees in Berlin. Shortly before the election, Wasiak would was campaining for the United Right outside the Basilica of St. John the Baptist in Berlin, handing out leaftleats and brochures in support for the candidates of the alliance. He also encouraged Polish voters to vote in the 2023 Polish referendum, arguing that it "is a very important election, perhaps one of the most important in our modern history".

In December 2023, the party declared its support for Grzegorz Braun, stating the need to defend him from persecution. In February 2024, Roman Dmowski's National Party participated in an anti-immigration protest in Warsaw organized by Braun's Confederation of the Polish Crown. The protesters expressed their opposition to "Poland being dragged into war", "imposition in Poland of far-fetched, doctrinaire programmes promoting a green, rainbow order"; the protesters also referred to the words of Łukasz Jasina, the former spokesman of the Ministry of Foreign Affairs, who stated that Poland is a "servant of the Ukrainian nation". The protesters argued that Polish relationship with Ukraine is asymmetrical and amounts to "a betrayal of the national interest". Apart from the National Party and Braun's party, the protest was also joined by the All-Polish Youth and Rodacy Kamraci.

In the 2024 Polish local elections, the party became a member of the National Action (Polish: Akcja Narodowa), a coalition of Confederation of the Polish Crown, There is One Poland, Real Politics Union, Safe Poland, Dmowski Club and Polish Thought Club in the Łódź Voivodeship. It won 9,231 votes, which amounted to 0.06% of the popular vote, but did not gain any seat.

== Structure ==
The party does not have a chairman; it instead has a party president, referred to as the "Vozhd" (wódz). The governing bodies of the party are the Party Congress, the president, the executive committee, the National Audit Committee, and the National Disciplinary Tribunal. It also has the Presidium of the executive board, led by the party president. At the president's request, the Party Congress approves of the candidates for all other bodies, including the executive board, the National Audit Committee and the National Disciplinary Tribunal. The president can appoint and dismiss the vice president, secretary, treasurer, spokesman, and the executive committee (and its members) at will. The executive committee comprises between 5 and 100 members. Term length in the party is 5 years.

== Ideology ==
Roman Dmowski's National Party declares that its "activities are aimed at ensuring that Poles themselves honour and require others to honour their faith, Polish civilisation and the Polish state", and that it is the only "uniformed party" that opposes "the annihilation of the Polish Nation and the Polish State". The party argues that "Poland should be for Poles and should be ruled by Poles", and claims to fight against the "Jewish rule in Poland", and "against the takeover of Poland by the Jewish and Masonic mafia". It has been described as pro-Law and Justice, radical, pro-Russian, anti-Ukrainian, nationalist, antisemitic, ultranationalist, national conservative, anti-NATO, and nationalist-socialist.

It considers itself "the only uniformed party in Poland", as party members are always dressed in military uniforms, and the party itself has been described as a paramilitary organisation. It argues that "the Polish government is not Polish; we have a 100% Judeo-Polish government"; Wasiak elaborated: "Poland must be a Poland for Poles, governed by Poles. No one is talking about racial hatred. No one is talking about chauvinism. But it cannot be the case that Poland is governed by a national minority." The party's slogan for the 2010 presidential election was "The Jewish minority must go!" Party's uniform is light-colored, in the color of sand, (also described as light brown, or "white sand") and includes a black beret along with a gorget.

The party follows the interwar ideology and political movement of Roman Dmowski, National Democracy. It is considered a split of the "senioral SN", the National Party (Poland, 1989) founded in 1989 and dissolved in 2001; senioral SN was split between the staunchly right-wing, post-Solidarność "blue faction", and the post-communist, socialist-leaning "pink faction", composed of the Endecja movement that cooperated with the Polish communist regime (referred to as Endokomuna). The main representative of the "pink faction" was the National Party "Fatherland". Within this context, Roman Dmowski's National Party is considered a representative of the post-communist "pink faction".

Polish political scientist Paweł Gotowiecki argued that the party shares the ideology of the "pink" National Party "Fatherland", noting their "almost identical" postulates on matters such as foreign policy. Party's leadership has communist backgrounds connected to the Patriotic Union Grunwald and the broader Endocommunist movement. The party's long-time vice president, Eugeniusz Sendecki, was associated with the Patriotic Union Grunwald and Self-Defence of the Republic of Poland. Party's leadership also includes Józef Kossecki, former member of the Polish United Workers' Party, main ideologue of the Patriotic Union Grunwald, as well as the former leader of Party X. The broader circle around the party has been described as nationalist-socialist, or national communist.

Party's leader, Ludwik Wasiak, served in the Polish People's Army. The party was also supported by national communist Bohdan Poręba, the communist leader of the Patriotic Union Grunwald, who approved of Wasiak's 2010 presidential candidacy and defended the actions of the Polish communists such as the 1968 antisemitic purges. Roman Dmowski's National Party also argued that "the formation of the Workers' Defence Committee in 1976 marked the beginning of a deliberate campaign to destroy the People’s Republic of Poland and to deprive Poles of the material wealth achieved under it." According to Polityka, there is a "degree of infatuation with the Polish United Workers' Party" in Roman Dmowski's National Party.

The party states the need to defend the Polish Catholic faith, and is supportive of Radio Maryja, and its founder, a Catholic priest Tadeusz Rydzyk. The party is also associated with members of Law and Justice. It supported the government of Law and Justice, stating:

PiS has put a stop to the dismantling of the Polish state. What PiS is doing right now is exactly what my Roman Dmowski's National Party would have done had it been in power. The only difference is that we would have done it a hundred times faster. Faster even than President Erdogan, who dealt with his opposition in Turkey with remarkable efficiency...

Similarly, the party supported the PiS-Samoobrona-LPR coalition that governed between 2006 and 2007, declaring its readiness to defend it from the Civic Platform in October 2006:

A mafia of frustrated, bankrupt and politically insignificant figures, led by the globalist Donald Tusk, is plotting a coup d’état and civil war. We will protect and defend the President, the Prime Minister and the Coalition with all the determination and strength we have, just as we did for Independence. (...) We will nip the monster in the bud. Assassins, terrorists, traitors and conspirators stand no chance.

=== Program ===
In its party program, Roman Dmowski's National Party included a list of 83 postulates. Some of them are: a new constitution that references God and introduces a presidential system with 10-year presidential terms, abolishing parliamentary immunity, compulsory military service from the age of 19 (24 months for men and 10 months for women), state assistance in finding employment after completing military service, barring citizens without without military training from holding political offices, taxing banks and foreign corporations, friendly relations with Russia, recovering finances borrowed to Ukraine, preserving Złoty, withdrawing Polish troops from all foreign territories, reconstructing the Saxon Palace, pro-natalist policy, abortion ban, payment of 1000 PLN for mothers giving up their newborns to discourage abortion, registration of ‘same-sex partnerships’ by the police (for the purposes of invigilation), state-guaranteed housing and employment for everyone under the age of 30, developing a nuclear bomb, "complete eradication" of unemployment through the establishment of labour camps, 3 years of maternity leave and a guarantee of reinstatement to the same job held before, guaranteed employment for both parents, anti-LGBT legislation, public ownership of natural resources and the media, and reindustrialization.

=== Foreign policy ===
It demands a radical change in Poland's foreign policy, postulating the pursuit of a Europe of sovereign nation states and restoring friendly relations with Russia as an alternative to European integration. The party opposes NATO and Polish membership in it. It argues that "dependence on the United States is bad, and an anti-Russian policy is even worse"; the party is also against the European Union, warning that Poland must not become an "Euro-ghetto". The party hails Russia as "Third Rome" because it "guards Christian value and resolutely combats the so-called gender ideology, which is a deadly virus that means anti-civilization".

It supports the Russian Federation in the Russo-Ukrainian War; the party supported the Russian annexation of Crimea, and praised Vladimir Putin for attacking Ukraine. The party is considered anti-Ukrainian, and stated that Poland must have "no tolerance for Banderites" and remember the Volhynia massacre; it argued that the Jewish elites want to arm Ukraine, while Poles must strive to maintain good relations with Russia. The party proposed a partition of Ukraine, and declared in 2014:

We support the policy of Vladimir Vladimirovich Putin, President of the Russian Federation, who, in the wake of the international intervention by the usurers on the Maidan and the armed seizure of power in Ukraine by the Bandera battalions, could not have reacted otherwise. Ukraine is to the Russian Federation what Texas is to Greater Israel. (...) Poland’s future lies in the east, and we Polish nationalists will never forget Polish Ukraine. (...) Lwów, Równe, Łuck and Kowel must return to the motherland, for a thousand years they were the heart of Poland – a free, tolerant, multi-ethnic Poland, stretching from sea to sea.

In response to the 2022 Russian invasion of Ukraine, the party argued that "it is very good that the Russian Federation’s army and the leaders of the Russian Federation (…) have launched a counter-attack, because the encirclement of the Russian Federation and indeed of all free nations must come to an end", and organized protests against the "import" of Ukrainian refugees, arguing that they are no real refugees but rather "parasites" by taking Polish jobs and housing.

== Election results ==
=== Sejm ===
Election	Votes	%	Seats	+/–	Government
2015	13,113	0.09 (#13)	0 / 460	New	Extra-parliamentary
2015	As part of the Committee of Grzegorz Braun "God Bless You!".				
2023	Endorsed United Right				

=== Regional assemblies ===
Election	%	Seats	+/–
2024	0.06 (#18)	0 / 855	Steady
2024	As part of the National Action (Polish: Akcja Narodowa).		

== See also ==
- National Party "Fatherland"
- Rodacy Kamraci
- Fatherland – Polish List
- Polish Confederation – Dignity and Work
- Alternative Social Movement
