= United Beyond Boundaries =

United Beyond Boundaries Zjednoczeni Ponad Podziałami
- Abbreviation: ZPP
- Leader: Wojciech Kornowski
- Founded: 2 February 2018
- Registered: 1 August 2018
- Split from: National Party of Retirees and Pensioners
- Headquarters: ul. Borkowska 22, 05-077 Warszawa Wesoła
- Membership (2019): 1200
- Ideology: Pensioners' rights Socialism; Left-wing nationalism Left-wing populism
- Political position: Left-wing (Note: The party is considered to be socialist, and an ideological mixture of Self-Defence of the Republic of Poland and the National Party of Retirees and Pensioners, both considered left-wing parties. The leader of the party, Wojciech Kornowski, was known as an enthusiastic communist activist, and founded a national communist political association in communist Poland. Even in the late 1980s, Kornowski criticised the ruling communist party, the Polish United Workers' Party, of being too passive and liberal in regards to upholding the legacy of communism. The party also made statements such as "The left in Poland today needs to refresh its image and has a real chance to become a to become a serious alternative to the ruling, increasingly extreme right.")
- Religion: Roman Catholic
- National affiliation: United Beyond Boundaries
- Colours: Red; White
- Sejm: 0 / 460
- Senate: 0 / 100
- European Parliament: 0 / 53
- Regional assemblies: 0 / 552
- City presidents: 0 / 117

Website
- United Beyond Boundaries website Action of Disappointed Retirees and Pensioners website
- Politics of Poland; Political parties; Elections; Logo of the Action of Disappointed Retirees and Pensioners, which was the name of the party between 2018 and 2022.

United Beyond Boundaries (Polish: Zjednoczeni Ponad Podziałami, ZPP), known as Action of Disappointed Retirees and Pensioners until 2022 (Polish: Akcja Zawiedzionych Emerytów Rencistów, AZER) is a Polish political party founded in 2018. The party was created in February 2018 and formally registered six months later, in August 2018. The leader of the party is Wojciech Kornowski, a prominent member and founder of the nationalist communist organisation Patriotic Union "Grunwald" (Polish: Zjednoczenie Patriotyczne „Grunwald”). Kornowski was briefly the leader of democratic socialist National Party of Retirees and Pensioners in May 2012, but seceded from the party to create his own pensioner-oriented party Pensioners' Party of the Republic of Poland (Polish: Partia Emerytów Rencistów Rzeczypospolitej Polskiej), which then became the Action of Disappointed Retirees and Pensioners in 2018. Since 2022, the party also leads an electoral committee "United Beyond Divisions" (Polish: Zjednoczeni Ponad Podziałami).

The party is described as a "hybrid" of the agrarian socialist and left-wing populist Self-Defence of the Republic of Poland, as well as the democratic socialist National Party of Retirees and Pensioners. The party includes former Self-Defence members such as Zbyszek Witaszek and Janusz Bryczkowski. AZER wants to reform Polish politics and strip currently dominating political parties of political influence, calling them "pseudo-elites" that govern "contrary to the interests of the State and the Nation", and which "must be rid of politics once and for all". The party also wants to represent the interests of disadvantaged social groups and strongly opposes privatization and neoliberalism, denouncing capitalism as the "new feudalism and even economic slavery".

== History ==
The party was created in February 2018 by Wojciech Kornowski, Sławomir Batóg, and Maksymilian Bartold. Wojciech Kornowski was chosen to be the leader of the party, and the District Court of Warsaw formally registered the party after 6 months of deliberation, in August 2018. Sławomir Batóg ran for a seat in the Masovian Voivodeship Sejmik from the electoral list of Free and Solidary.

Wojciech Kornowski joined the Polish United Workers' Party in 1968, and in the 1980s he founded Patriotic Union "Grunwald" (Polish: Zjednoczenie Patriotyczne „Grunwald”), a nationalist and communist political associations that aimed to "bring together activists with nationalist views who accepted the communist reality". In that period, Kornowski was described as "more than an enthusiastic communist PZPR activist".

In the 1989 Polish legislative election, Kornowski ran unsuccessfully in Poznań from the communist list of the Polish United Workers' Party, and later founded the Polish Economic Party, and later that year also co-founded the Confederation of Polish Employers. In the 1997 Polish parliamentary election, Wojciech Kornowski ran for the Senate from his own committee, but failed to gain a seat. In 2000, he founded another political party, the Polish Economic Union, in which he also served as president. In the 2001 Polish parliamentary election, it received 0.06% of the vote. Wojciech Kornowski, as leader of this party, won 308 votes.

At the turn of 2003 and 2004, Kornowski established the All-Poland Civic Committee 'OKO', which received 0.58% of the vote in the 2004 European Parliament election in Poland. In 2005, it was transformed into the All-Poland Civic Coalition, which received 0.14% of the vote in the elections to the Sejm. Wojciech Kornowski as leader received 130 votes. In the 2005 Polish presidential election, Kornowski's party fielded Stanisław Tymiński, who received 0.16% of the vote. Kornowski headed Tymiński's election committee.

In the early 2010s, Kornowski became an activist in the National Party of Retirees and Pensioners, a left-wing pensioners' party. He became acting chairman of the party in May 2012, but he seceded from it to form another party, the Pensioners' Party of the Republic of Poland (Polish: Partia Emerytów Rencistów Rzeczypospolitej Polskiej). The party then became the Action of Disappointed Retirees and Pensioners in 2018.

Prior to the 2019 Polish parliamentary election, a number of former Self-Defence of the Republic of Poland activists, among others, became associated with AZER. The election staff included leaders of the Slavic Union and the Patriotic Party of Poland and Polonia, as well as the director of the parliamentary office of Janusz Sanocki (head of the Restore the Law circle). Activists of the former electoral committee Polskie Rodziny Razem (originating from League of Polish Families) also became associated with the party. Also cooperating with AZER were Roman Dmowski's National Party and Piast - Jedność Myśli Europejskich Narodów, as well as former leaders of Polska Patriotyczna.

In the elections, AZER registered lists for the Sejm of Poland in three districts. In the Konin district, the list was opened by Zdzisław Jankowski (former Self-Defence of the Republic of Poland MP, one of the leaders of the Slavic Union and Patriotic Poland), and in 2nd place was Piast-JMEN president Eugeniusz Maciejewski. In the Białystok district, the list was opened by Mirosław Basiewicz, with members of Samoobrona and WiS among others. In the Siedlce district, the list was opened by Adam Bednarczyk of Organisation of the Polish Nation - Polish League, it also included, among others, a member of Stronnictwo Pracy. In the remaining districts, the party gave its support to Confederation Liberty and Independence. The party explained that Confederation gave AZER a promise to fight for the abolition of the tax on pensions. In the elections, the AZER committee received 5448 votes (0.03% nationally, placing it penultimate, 9th among all committees), coming last in all three districts. It won 0.64% of the vote in Konin, and just over 0.3% in others.

In the 2020 Polish presidential election, the party's candidate was supposed to be Kajetan Pyrzyński, but he failed to collect the required number of signatures, and after the ballot failed to appoint a committee in the 2020 Polish presidential election.

On 22 February 2022, numerous organisations, led by AZER, signed a declaration regarding the establishment of a joint committee, United Beyond Divisions, in the 2023 Polish parliamentary election. Among the signatories were political parties (WiS, SPPiP, Roman Dmowski's National Party, Stronnictwo "Piast", Wspólnie dla Zdrowia and Awakened Consumers) and a number of other organisations (including National Union of Farmers, Circles and Agricultural Organisations led by Władysław Serafin, former MP of the Polish People's Party).

On 8 July 2023, the party participated in a protest "Sunday of Ukrainian Settlement" organized in front of the Ukrainian embassy in Warsaw. The protest intended to commemorate the victims of massacres of Poles in Volhynia and Eastern Galicia. The participants also spoke against sending military aid to Ukraine, arguing that Poland has become a transit country for the West. Some participants, such as Wacław Klukowski, also argued that the Russo-Ukrainian war is not beneficial also from the point of view of Polish interests, but also from the point of view of Ukrainian agriculture, placed in the hands of "transnational corporations".

In the 2023 Polish parliamentary election, United Beyond Boundaries registered two Senate candidates associated with Confederation Liberty and Independence (competing, however, with its National Movement candidates): Zbigniew Dąbrowski of Confederation of the Polish Crown and Paweł Wyrzykowski of New Hope. They took the last places in their districts (a total of 13,422 votes were cast for them). In the elections to the Sejm and the remaining possible districts to the Senate, the leader of the party, Wojciech Kornowski, opted to support the Confederation Liberty and Independence electoral lists, while noting the enormous difference in political views between his party and Confederation. In his statement, Kornowski wrote:

After many discussions, we have come to the conclusion and urge our members and supporters to vote for the Confederation. These discussions have shown that the Confederation is compatible with our ideology and many of the postulates proclaimed by its leaders can be counted as wishful thinking rather than a serious program that Poland needs. However, we assume that the Confederation has not yet ruled and can be a party which will undertake an effective struggle against the post-Round Table parties which have been ruling alternately for 33 years. The United Beyond Boundaries have written repeatedly saying that no matter whether PiS or the opposition wins, nothing in Poland will change for the better. We hold the Confederation to their word that they will at least try to consign to the dustbin of history the post-round-table deal that did so much harm to Poland.

In the 2024 Polish local elections, the party registered the Electoral Committee of Voters Beyond Boundaries (Polish: Komitet Wyborczy Wyborców Ponad Podziałami), which contested two city council seats in the Silesian city of Lędziny. It managed to narrowly win one of the two seats, in the electoral district no. 11.

== Election results ==
=== Sejm ===
| Election | Votes | % | Seats | +/– | Government |
|---|---|---|---|---|---|
| 2019 | 5,448 | 0.03 (#9) | 0 / 460 | New | Extra-parliamentary |
| 2019 | Ran in three districts only, endorsed Confederation elsewhere. | | | | |
| 2023 | Endorsed Confederation. | | | | |

=== Regional assemblies ===
| Election | % | Seats | +/– |
|---|---|---|---|
| 2024 | 0.00 | 0 / 552 | New |
| 2024 | Won a seat in the city council of Lędziny. | | |

== Ideology ==
The Action of Disappointed Retirees and Pensioners is considered to be an ideological mixture of the Self-Defence of the Republic of Poland as well as the National Party of Retirees and Pensioners. Self-Defence is a left-wing nationalist, Christian socialist and populist party based on agrarianism, socialism, anti-capitalism, and Catholic social teaching, while the National Party of Retirees and Pensioners is a democratic socialist party that cooperates with other left-wing parties such as the Democratic Left Alliance – Labour Union. Similarly, AZER has also been described as a socialist party. The leader of AZER, Wojciech Kornowski was an ardent supporter of Andrzej Lepper and his party includes many former Self-Defence members. He also used to be the acting chairman of the National Party of Retirees and Pensioners, and founded a national communist association in the 1980s. Kornowski stressed the left-wing nationalist character of the party, describing his pensioner supporters as "the most patriotic social group" in Poland.

The party heavily emphasises its populist rhetoric, denouncing major parties such as the Polish People's Party, Civic Platform and Law and Justice as the "pseudo-elites". The party accuses Polish politicians of "insulting the nation" and making false assessments of marginalised social groups. AZER argues that Polish governments mainly look after their own interests and had "sold out" Polish economy to foreign companies, "including banks and retail chains". The party believes that "there is no more important issue in Poland, no more important issue for the whole nation, than removing from power in democratic elections all those who are the perpetrators of dozens of scandals, who stir up Poles, who lie and who deceive the nation", concluding that "there is no other social force in Poland but the ten-million-strong army of pensioners who can change the economic status and social prestige of the Polish people by voting in elections".

AZER strongly opposes privatisation, believing that the privatisation was riddled with corruption and resulted in Polish state-owned being sold to foreign capital, or "to politically or socially connected individuals". The party denounces the concept of the "invisible hand of the market", arguing that capitalism fails to solve structural problems of the economy. AZER calls for the "redistribution of national income among individual social groups". The party calls its proposed economic system "Common Good Economy" (Polish: Gospodarka Dobra Wspólnego), which would include dominant role in the state, heavy regulation on foreign capital and abolition of capitalism, which it considers "camouflaged new feudalism and even economic slavery".

The party also advocates for "comprehensive measures to guarantee the development of communal housing", arguing that the current housing crisis is "a consequence of the application of neoliberal solutions" to the economy. AZER proposes introducing a new housing system that would incorporate communial housing and include housing credits and extensive tax breaks; the party wants the state to play the dominant role in the housing industry, writing: "We do not see the increase of the state's share in financing housing construction as a burden on the budget, but as a way to improve the state budget over a period of several years by reducing expenditure on unemployment benefits (as a result of an increase in employment in the construction industry) and by increasing revenues to the budget".

The Action of Disappointed Retirees and Pensioners calls for protectionism, stressing the need to stop Poland from "being marginalised in the industrial division of labour, subordinated to transnational, global corporations and passively consenting to remaining under the control and dictate of international financial organisations and global concerns". The party believes that while "ruined by the liberals of the Third Republic of Poland", the Polish state has an enormous economic potential, and should protect Polish farmers and agriculture against foreign competition, while protecting Polish economy from "global corporations" in general.

The party argues that while the membership in the European Union has been valuable, it should be replaced with "Europe of Sovereign States and Nations, without supranational structures and dependencies". AZER believes that the European Union should have no right to interfere with the economy of its member states, and argues that the current structure of the Union results in domination of economically strongest countries. The party suggests that Poland seek stronger cooperation with the regional Visegrad Group, especially with countries such as Czech Republic and Hungary. The party also calls for a thaw in relations with Russia and Belarus, arguing that Poland should join the Eurasian Economic Union and deepen its cooperation with other post-Soviet countries, calling for balance between Polish relations with the West and the East.

In regards to pensioners, the party plans to abolish all tax on pensions and increasing pensions yearly on the basis of "actual level of inflation" which would be determined by establishing an annual list of the 50 most frequently purchased times. AZER argues that minimum pension should equal the living wage, which it defines as "amount which secures the necessary standard of living". The party also wants to establish a special pensions for grandparents which raise their grandchildren, and a state aid program which would foresee "allocation of approximately 500 m² of currently uncultivated land for each retiree" - land ownership reform and redistribution. The party also proposes the construction of at least one additional hospital ward dedicated exclusively to geriatrics with the required diagnostic and rehabilitation facilities in each Polish province, while also introducing a special school subject to primary and secondary schools which would "encourage good attitudes among young people and the application of the principle of respect, assistance to the elderly".

== See also ==
- Self-Defence of the Republic of Poland
- National Party of Retirees and Pensioners
- Pensioners' Party
- Piast Faction
