= Grzegorz Braun =

Polish politician (born 1967)

Grzegorz Braun MEP
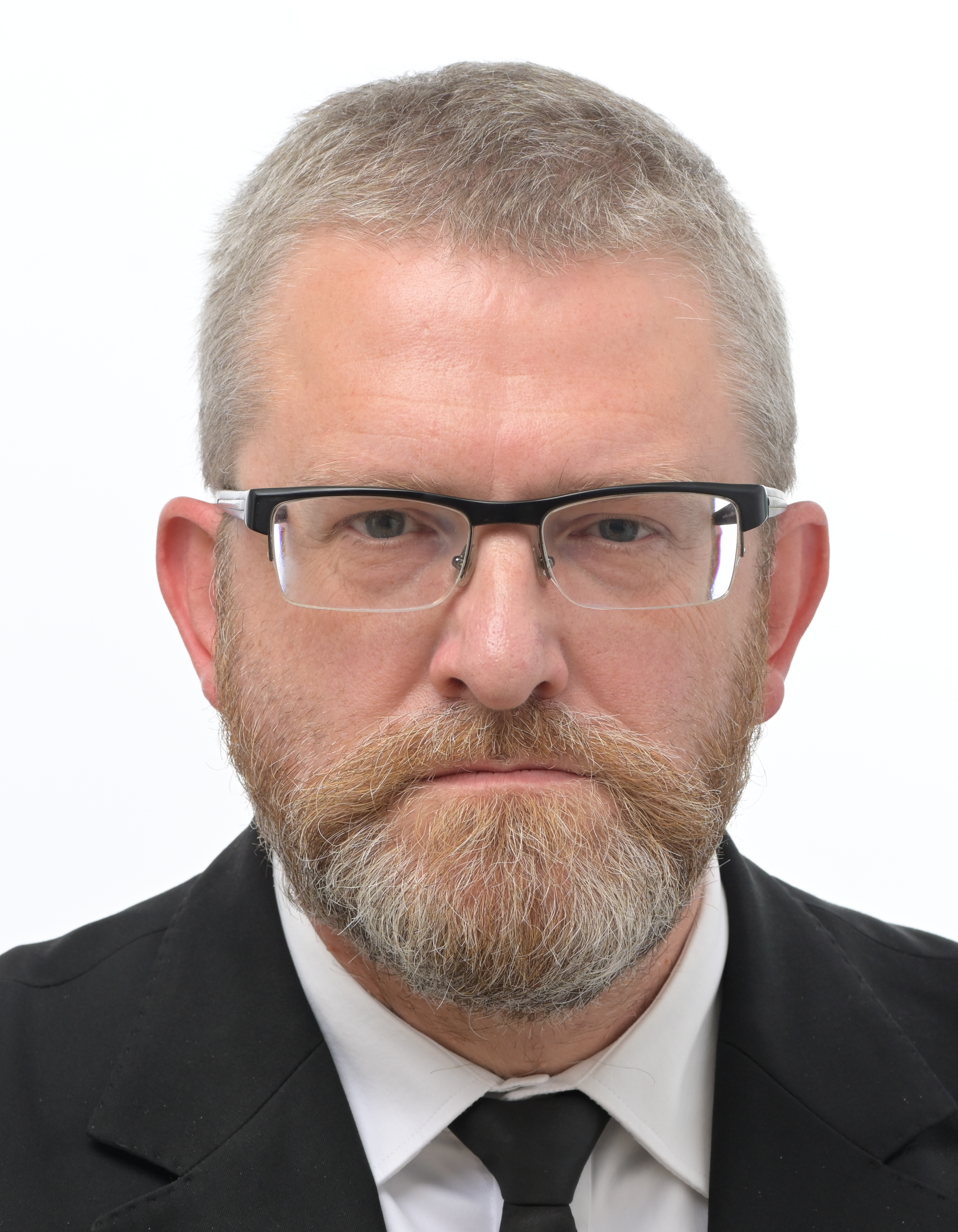
- Official portrait, 2024

Member of the European Parliament for Lesser Poland and Świętokrzyskie
- Incumbent
- Assumed office 16 July 2024
- Parliamentary group: Non-Inscrits

Member of the Sejm
- In office 12 November 2019 – 15 July 2024
- Constituency: No. 23 (Rzeszów)

Chairman of the Confederation of the Polish Crown
- Incumbent
- Assumed office 7 September 2019

Personal details
- Born: Grzegorz Michał Braun; 11 March 1967 (age 59) Toruń, Polish People's Republic
- Party: Confederation of the Polish Crown
- Other political affiliations: Confederation Liberty and Independence (until 2025)
- Spouse: Aleksandra Braun
- Children: 3

Grzegorz Michał Braun (Note: Polish pronunciation: [ɡʐɛ'ɡɔʂ mi'xaw braun]) (born 11 March 1967) is a Polish far-right politician and filmmaker. He was a member of the Sejm for Rzeszów (Note: Officially Constituency no. 23) from 2019 to 2024 and has been a member of the European Parliament (MEP) for Lesser Poland and Świętokrzyskie since 2024. He has been the chairman of the Confederation of the Polish Crown (KKP) since 2019.

Born in Toruń, Braun's political career began when he announced his candidacy in the 2015 presidential election. He formed the campaign committee "God Bless You!", but received a minimal percentage of the vote. His political journey continued with his participation in discussions on European and Russian relations and his candidacies in various elections including for the mayoral office of Gdańsk and the European Parliament. Despite electoral setbacks, he was elected to the Sejm at the 2019 parliamentary election. He was re-elected at the 2023 parliamentary election. Braun's tenure in politics has been marked by controversy, including inflammatory remarks during the COVID-19 pandemic and endorsements of independent nuclear capabilities for Poland.

Braun has broadly been described as a nationalist and far-right, and his views as anti-American, anti-Ukrainian, antisemitic, anti-Zionist, and anti-LGBTQ. His tenure in the Sejm was characterised by numerous antisemitic incidents. In 2023 he invaded a Holocaust lecture, destroyed equipment and made derogatory comments about Jews. Later that year, he put out a Hanukkah menorah in the Sejm using a fire extinguisher, leading to his exclusion from the session. In May 2025, the European Parliament lifted his immunity. In July 2025, he was charged with seven criminal offences stemming from multiple incidents occurring between 2022 and 2023, including assault. Later that month, Braun publicly denied that the Nazis used gas chambers at Auschwitz concentration camp during the Second World War.

== Biography ==
Grzegorz Michał Braun was born in Toruń in the Polish People's Republic on 11 March 1967. He is the son of Kazimierz Braun, a theatre-director and writer. According to Braun's sister Monika Braun, their family immigrated to what is now Lviv, Ukraine, from Austria in the 18th century. His uncle, Juliusz Braun, was president of Telewizja Polska and was chief of the National Broadcasting Council.

He graduated from the University of Wrocław in 1987, and completed postgraduate studies at the Krzysztof Kieślowski Faculty of Radio and Television at the University of Silesia in Katowice in 1993. From 1987 onwards he co-organised activities of the Orange Alternative, for which he was oppressed by the communist government of the Polish People's Republic. In 1988 and 1989, he participated in student protests at the University of Wrocław. He was also active in the Polish-Czech-Slovak Solidarity.

He was a member of the editorial board of the Fronda magazine from 1990 to 1994. Later, he also was a journalist for the Option Right, as well as Polskie Radio Wrocław. He was involved with the Polish Monarchists Organisation (Polish: Organizacja Monarchistów Polskich), for which he contributed written works and lectures. He is involved with "Wake-up Call" ("Pobudka"), an organisation that he has founded to strengthen the self-sustainability of faith communities, and the internet show Sumienie Narodu.

In 2005 Braun released a documentary film about the alleged collaboration between Solidarity-leader and later President of Poland Lech Wałęsa and the Ministry of Public Security (SB), the secret police of the Polish People's Republic. Wałęsa filed a lawsuit against Braun, and Braun filed a countersuit for defamation. A hearing was held, and the court dismissed both claims.

== Political career ==
In 2012, Braun called for the execution by firing squad of journalists from Gazeta Wyborcza and TVN, which led to an official investigation. In 2023 the Prosecutor's Office dismissed the case.

In, 2015 he formed his own campaign committee, God Bless You! (Szczęść Boże!), and received 13,113 votes amounting to 0.09 per cent of the total cast.

In January 2019 Braun announced his candidacy for the mayoral office of Gdańsk. The election was called after the murder of Mayor Paweł Adamowicz. Braun's candidacy was endorsed by Janusz Korwin-Mikke and the National Movement. On 4 March 2019 it was determined that Braun received 11.86 per cent of votes and thus conceded to the winner, Aleksandra Dulkiewicz, who received 82.22 per cent of the votes.

In the 2019 European Parliament election in Poland Braun was the leading candidate for the Confederation Liberty and Independence in the 9th constituency encompassing the territory of the Subcarpathian Voivodeship. Although his list received 5.89 per cent of the vote, the best result for Confederation in the country, the coalition failed to reach the 5 per cent threshold nationwide and so he did not pick up the seat.

In the 2019 Polish parliamentary election Braun was the leading candidate for the Confederation Liberty and Independence in the Rzeszów Constituency, located in the Podkarpackie Voivodeship. He built on his success from the last election, and his list received 8.25 per cent of the vote, which was again the best result for the Confederation nationwide. This time Braun picked up the seat, as did 10 other candidates from the Confederation.

He was a candidate in the 2020 Confederation presidential primary. He made it into the final round of voting where he lost to Krzysztof Bosak. He immediately endorsed Bosak and said he would campaign for him.

On 27 January 2023 Braun destroyed a Christmas tree decorated with baubles themed with Ukrainian, EU and LGBTQ pride flags located in the building of the Kraków District Court. He said that he had staged a "parliamentary intervention".

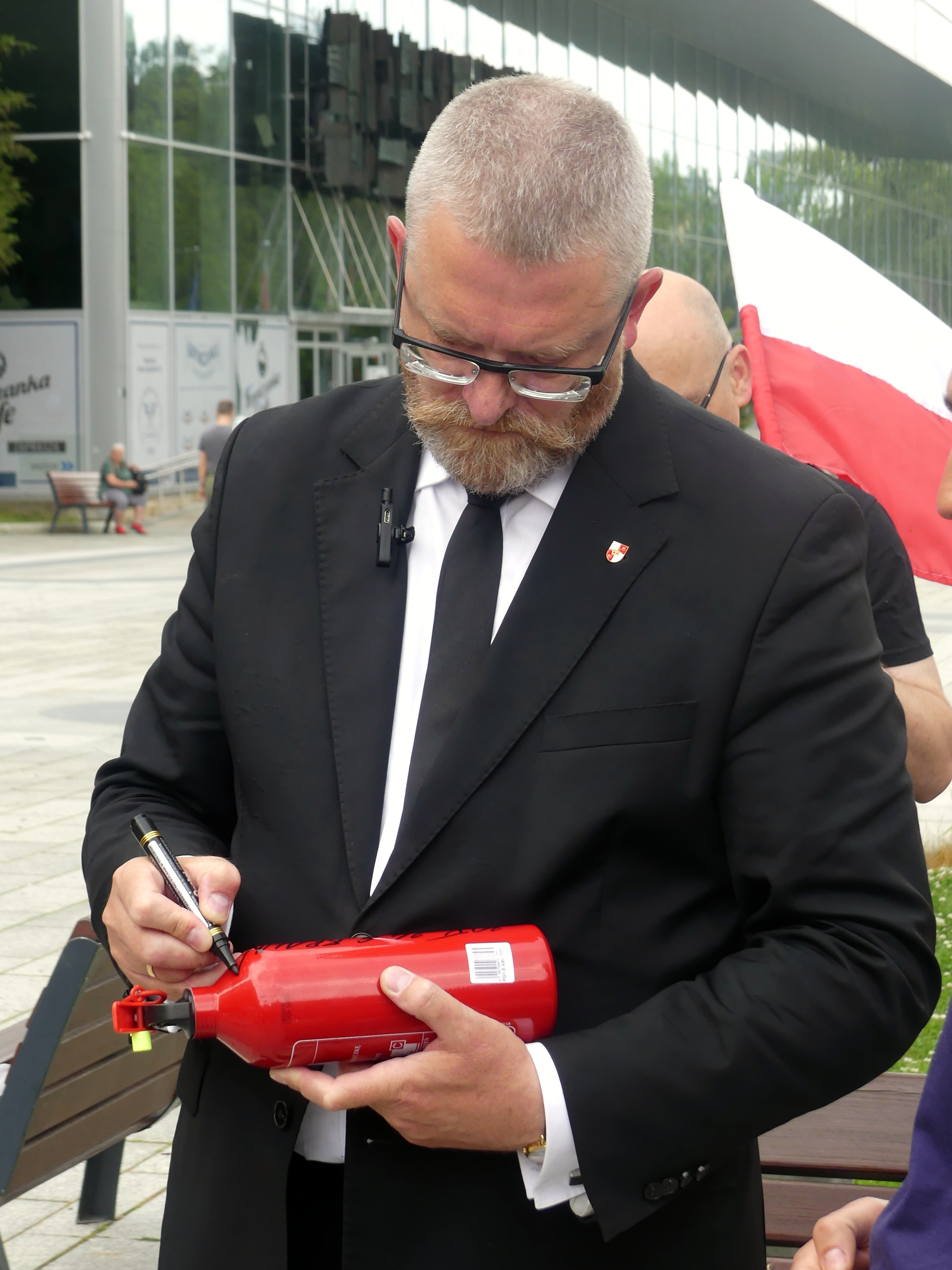
Braun during a meeting with voters in May 2024

Braun was elected to the European Parliament in the 2024 European Parliament election.

On 12 October, Braun stated that, "the Polish Army should not lift a finger in the defence of a small, depopulated, nasty, anti-Polish, Bismarck, Anglo-Saxon and Jewish creature, that is modern Lithuania".

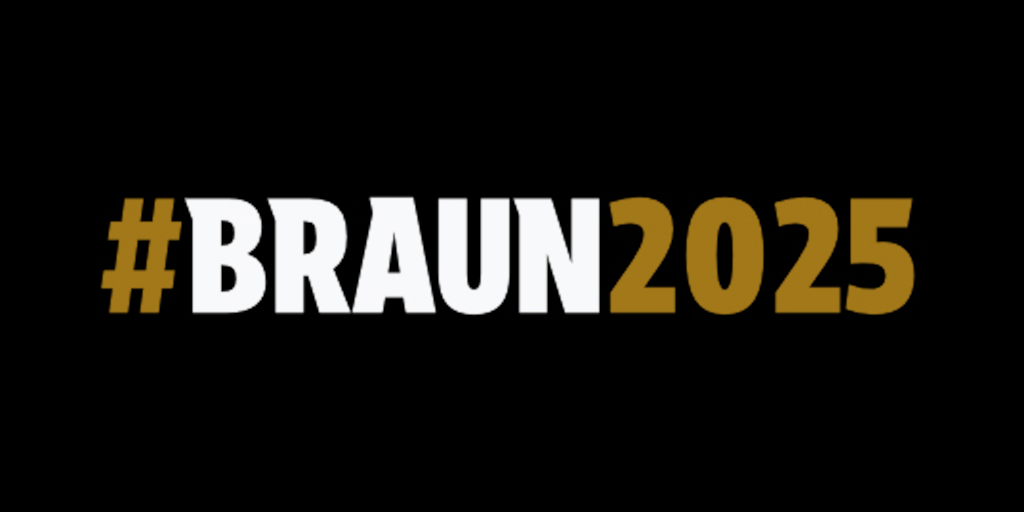
Logo for Braun's 2025 presidential campaign

On 15 January 2025, Braun announced he would run for President of Poland in the upcoming election, confirming previous speculations. He declared his intent despite the fact that the Confederation Liberty and Independence (KWiN) leadership had designated Sławomir Mentzen as its presidential candidate back in August 2024. As a result, Braun was expelled from the party on 17 January. Janusz Korwin-Mikke, founder and former member of the KWiN, has expressed support for Braun's candidacy.

According to a report by the "Never Again" Association, Braun has long supported Janusz Waluś, the murderer of the South African Communist Party leader Chris Hani, undertaking parliamentary interventions to obtain his release from life imprisonment and promoting fundraisers for him. He also defended Waluś's crime, stating, among other things, "In my world, shooting communist party secretaries can be a noble act, because committed out of necessity."

On 16 April 2025 Braun, along with MP Roman Fritz and a group of activists, attempted a citizen's arrest of a gynaecologist working at a hospital in Oleśnica: Braun and his group prevented the gynaecologist from leaving her office, Braun called her a "serial murderer", and pushed her. The police were called, but they did not arrest Braun or his group. The doctor had previously legally aborted a 37-week-old foetus since its severe congenital bone fragility would have caused a significant risk to the mother; it also had a very high chance of being a stillbirth. After the incident, the doctor was harassed and doxxed on social media and the hospital was sent bomb threats. Braun's sister condemned his actions in an article for the newspaper Tygodnik Powszechny, and said that "the line has been crossed".

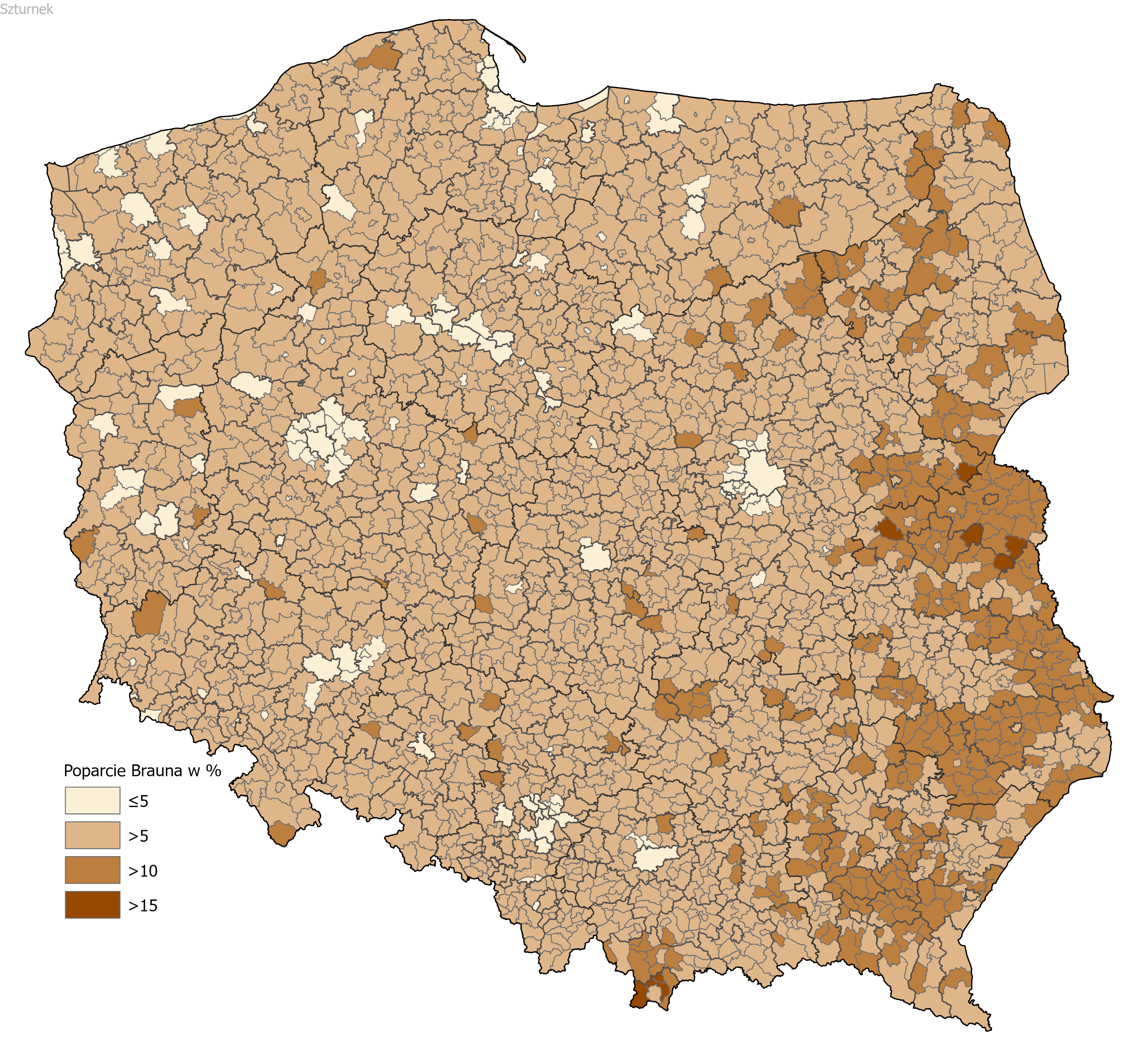
2025 Results of Braun. He obtained the highest result in Gmina Podedwórze (20.16%), and the lowest in Krynica Morska (3.17%)

As at April 2025, Braun was polling between 1% and 4% in the 2025 Polish presidential election. According to a survey conducted by Opinia24 between 6 and 7 May for Fakty TVN, 4% of 1000 respondents said that they would vote for Braun. In a survey conducted by the Pollster Research Institute (Polish: Instytut Badań Pollster) for Super Express between 7 and 8 May 2025, out of 1,077 respondents, 5.3% responded that they would vote for Braun if the presidential election were held that Sunday, 11 May 2025.

On 6 May 2025 the European Parliament voted in favour of removing Braun's EU-level immunity from prosecution; the Polish prosecutor's office had requested it a day before.

Braun's 2025 presidential campaign had the endorsement of the former Self-Defence of the Republic of Poland candidate Aldona Skirgiełło, PolExit, Real Europe Movement and National Rebirth of Poland.

On the first round of voting on 18 May 2025, Braun placed fourth and won 6.3% of the vote.

At the end of December 2025, following an intervention by the "Never Again" Association, the TikTok platform removed six videos published on Grzegorz Braun's channel. These included recordings containing antisemitic and xenophobic content. In January 2026, TikTok deleted further materials by Braun – reported for review by the "Never Again" – and temporarily restricted the recommendation of his channel's content to users. Piotr Żaczko, TikTok's spokesperson for Central and Eastern Europe, provided the following justification for the decision: "A number of videos published by MEP Braun violated our community guidelines regarding hate speech and have been removed. [...] We do not allow hate speech, hateful behavior, or the promotion of hateful ideologies."

== Views ==
Braun is a Traditionalist Catholic. He begins each of his speeches with the words "God bless you". He is fiercely critical of Protestantism in Poland and has often debated Protestants in public. Braun is a monarchist and is a critic of democracy. He advocates for the formal recognition of Jesus as the king of Poland.

Braun has criticized foreign influence in Poland, calling it a "Russo-German condominium under a Jewish-American trusteeship". He has called the POLIN Museum of the History of Polish Jews a "propaganda-disinformation centre".

Braun repeatedly criticized the Law and Justice party, calling their MPs "the followers of Gog and Magog, destroyers of Polish tradition and Latin civilization" and "a reenactment group of Sanation".

Braun calls for Poland to independently maintain and operate nuclear weapons.

Braun praised vigilante groups, organized by football hooligans, that assaulted and harassed ethnic minorities in Przemyśl. One group assaulted three Indians in Przemyśl with baseball bats and bottles, leaving one hospitalised. The police denied reports of a spike in crime caused by migrants from Ukraine.

=== Foreign policy ===
==== Russia and Ukraine ====
Braun has been described as pro-Russian, and was interviewed by Russian-state owned news agency Sputnik in 2019. He was praised by the Russian media for his stances on Ukraine since the beginning of the 2022 invasion.

In a 2018 article titled "Ukrainian spectres and delusions" (Polish: Ukraińskie upiory i urojenia), Braun wrote, "Ukraine is a fiction. And it is a dangerous fiction. The fiction of an independent state as a civilised partner and the fiction of a sovereign nation, with which we can finally normalise neighbourly relations."

On 24 February 2022, Braun posted a tweet demanding Poland to not open its borders to Ukrainian refugees. He was the only MP who voted against a resolution in the Sejm condemning the invasion of Ukraine and calling upon NATO and the European Union to provide support to Ukraine. He was interviewed by Sputnik again less than a month after the invasion, in which he said that Russia is not the sole instigator of the Russo-Ukrainian War and Ukrainians would be held accountable for their "banderism".

Braun opposes Polish aid to Ukrainian refugees. He launched a campaign titled "Stop the Ukrainization of Poland", which was intended to dissuade the public from supporting the refugees by "exaggerating the potential cultural impact of absorbing so many Ukrainians and emphasizing the historical differences between the two nations". He demanded that the government remove the right of Ukrainian citizens to apply for a temporary residency permit and end further Ukrainian immigration to prevent a major shift in Poland's demographics. He claimed that his party was actively fighting against the "banderization" and "Ukrainization" of Poland by trying to prevent the influx of Ukrainian refugees. Paulina Nodzyńska, writing for Gazeta Wyborcza, said that Braun was at the "forefront" of Ukrainophobic internet propaganda.

On 25 June 2022, Braun took part in a pro-Russian rally; he addressed his speech to Volodymyr Zelenskyy and Joe Biden, proclaiming "President Joe Biden, if you still trust God, let your private interest and the interest of American corporations, that sell weapons to Ukraine, along with entire America, kneel in humility in front of God's almightiness(...)". During a debate in the European Parliament (EP), Braun stated that the military aid to Ukraine is not helping the Ukrainian people, but only prolonging the war, after which his microphone was cut off. He shouted "thieves, thieves!" during a vote on using frozen Russian assets to assist Ukraine financially. In the Sejm, Braun blamed Ukraine for the war and claimed that it was caused by a discriminatory language law towards ethnic Russians.

On 4 June 2024, Braun and a group of supporters pulled down the Ukrainian flag atop Kościuszko Mound. During a 2025 rally, a supporter of Braun took down a Ukrainian flag hanging from the Biała Podlaska town hall and replaced it with a Polish flag, after which Braun thanked him for his actions and shook his hand. Braun later took responsibility for the incident and said that the Ukrainian flag would be delivered to the closest Ukrainian consulate.

After the 2025 Russian drone incursion into Poland, Braun and Janusz Korwin-Mikke claimed that it was staged by the Polish government as part of a conspiracy to involve the country in the Russo-Ukrainian War. They said that they had filed a claim to prosecutors of a suspected crime. Prime minister Donald Tusk and president Karol Nawrocki accused them of spreading Russian disinformation, and foreign minister Radosław Sikorski accused them of being "Russian lackeys".

On 10 September 2026, Braun damaged a granite obelisk above a mass grave of 41 Ukrainian Insurgent Army fighters, who in 1946, were killed in combat with the Soviet NKVD in the village of Białystok, Lublin Voivodeship. The Ministry of Foreign Affairs of Ukraine and Polish foreign minister Radosław Sikorski condemned Braun's actions.

==== European Union ====
Braun supports a Polish withdrawal from the European Union (EU). He has called the EU a "eurokolkhoz". (Note: A kolkhoz was a type of collective farm in the Soviet Union.)

Braun stole a flag of Europe from the Ministry of Industry and burnt it at the Pacification of Wujek memorial.

On 6 May 2025, Braun travelled to the Ministry of Industry in Katowice with Roman Fritz and a group of supporters, where they demanded to meet with Minister Marzena Czarnecka. After being told that she was attending a meeting in Warsaw, they asked to see the acting minister, Kinga Okrzesik-Faruga, and said that they were staging a "parliamentary intervention". They posed questions to Okrzesik-Faruga regarding her role in the ministry and the liquidation of coal mines, which she said she would answer in writing.

While leaving the building, Braun stole a flag of Europe from the lobby of the building after a short argument with ministry employees, trampled upon the flag, drove with it to the Wujek mine, wiped his shoes with it, and burnt it under the monument to the miners killed there. He posted a recording of the flag burning on Twitter with the caption "The miners of the 'Wujek' mine and others died at the hands of the Soviet authorities not so that a Euro-Soviet regime would be established on Polish soil today."

==== Israel and Palestine ====
On 7 October 2024, during a debate in the European Parliament on the first anniversary of the October 7 attacks that initiated the Gaza war, Braun called for Israel to be designated a terrorist state, describing Benjamin Netanyahu and his government as the "largest and most criminal terrorist organisation". Braun disrupted a moment of silence held during the European Parliament's sitting in commemoration of the 2025 International Holocaust Remembrance Day by shouting "Let's pray for the victims of the Jewish genocide in Gaza." He repeated the sentence again, thanked the audience for "praying for the victims of the Jewish genocide in Gaza", and was subsequently excluded from the meeting and escorted out.

Braun later claimed on social media that he did not "disrupt" the proceeding, but was merely "supplement[ing]" it, saying, "I shared the comment that apparently all victims are equal, but some are more equal than others". Polish MEP Łukasz Kohut condemned Braun's actions, calling him a "disgusting creature", and Dutch MEP Bert-Jan Ruissen said that Braun was antisemitic and called upon the European Parliament to impose the "highest possible sanction". The European Jewish Congress said that the incident was a "vile display of antisemitism in the heart of European democracy."

=== Jews and Israel ===
Braun has been quoted accusing Jews of being "the enemies of Poland" and alleging their desire to undertake a "hostile takeover" of Polish territory and to place ethnic Poles in reservations, an allegory for Indian reservations. He has also claimed there exists a plan to turn Poland into a "Jewish state", and delivered a speech to his supporters in which he said "us non-Jews have only one choice: to serve like animals, like cattle…This is a teaching spread for 2,000 years [by Jews], since the manger and the cross of Christ were rejected ... Do you want a future for your children that is shared by children in Gaza today? Do you want such a fate for Polish children? A fate of slaves, subhumans, at the mercy of the Jewish Übermensch?"

Braun disrupted a lecture on the Holocaust by the historian Jan Grabowski at the German Historical Institute in Warsaw by invading the room and destroying the microphone and speakers. He told the director of the institute, Milos Reznik, that "[a] German in Warsaw is not going to tell me I shouldn't damage something. Get out of Warsaw, now!" after he was criticized by him for destroying the institute's property. Braun refused to leave when instructed to do so by police, using his immunity from prosecution as a member of European Parliament.

Braun's actions and statements have led to criticism from within his own party. Sławomir Mentzen, one of the leaders of the Confederation party, condemned Braun's actions, stating his intent to take further steps in addressing the situation. Additionally, Cardinal Grzegorz Ryś, Archbishop of Łódź, said, "I am ashamed and I apologise to the whole Jewish community in Poland" following the incident. Braun has denied having racist motives and described his actions as a response to what he perceives as "Satanic, Talmudist triumphalism" of Jewish holidays.

==== Extinguishing the Hanukkah menorah in the Sejm ====
On 12 December 2023, during the first session of the 10th term of the Sejm, Braun put out a Hanukkah menorah with a fire extinguisher, saying that "The people participating in the Satanic cult should be ashamed". Security guards ordered the area to be evacuated because of the resultant white cloud of aerosol. A woman was taken to a hospital due to respiratory issues caused by the resultant fumes. He was excluded from the ongoing session of the Sejm, and punished by having his parliamentary allowance withheld for six months.

According to a report released by the "Never Again" Association, Braun, referring to the incident, said, "At this time next year, I will be on the lookout for all those who believe that it is necessary to professionally extinguish fires started in public spaces. I applaud all forms of protest and attempts to put an end to such activities," in a video published by journalist Leszek Szymowski's YouTube channel.

The speaker of the Sejm, Szymon Hołownia, announced that a criminal complaint would be filed with prosecutors. Hołownia also sent an inquiry to a police commissioner to verify whether Braun has a firearm permit, as he received information from the Marshal Guard that Braun asked in the past if he can deposit a personal firearm in Sejm. The Sejm voted to lift Braun's immunity from criminal prosecution in relation to his attack on the Hanukkah menorah. Prosecutors previously said that they intended to charge him with seven counts also included earlier incidents of alleged aggression against a former health minister and public property. If convicted, he faces up to five years' imprisonment.

==== Comments during the 2025 presidential debates ====
During the presidential debates broadcast live on television and online, on 28 April 2025, Braun argued that "Jews have too much, far too much to say in Polish matters" and "the genocidal policies promoted by ministers, rabbis, and generals of the state of Israel could easily be turned against us." He claimed that Israel is "pushed on Poles as an ally, as some kind of aircraft carrier for European civilization in the Middle East." He criticized presidential candidate Rafał Trzaskowski for previously wearing a "Jewish daffodil", referring to a yellow daffodil worn annually to commemorate the Warsaw Ghetto Uprising, calling the flower "a symbol of shame". Trzaskowski said "What are you talking about? What shame? That was the uprising in the Warsaw Ghetto. Those are the heroes of our history. It's unbelievable. I won't listen to this," and left the podium. After she was called to the podium, Magdalena Biejat called Braun's words "antisemitic filth" and said that they should not be tolerated in public debate. A representative of the District Prosecutor's Office in Warsaw-Praga announced that an investigation had been initiated into possible hate speech charges against Braun.

==== Comments on the Jedwabne pogrom and Auschwitz gas chambers ====
On 10 July 2025, Braun attended an event commemorating the anniversary of the 1941 Jedwabne pogrom, where 40 Poles led by German forces massacred at least 340 Jews. Next to a monument, a banner from the Confederation of the Polish Crown was placed, which said "Enough of Jewish lies. The Jedwabne crime [..] was committed by the Germans. We demand more exhumations." During the event, Braun called the Chief Rabbi of Poland, Michael Schudrich, a criminal and a fraud. Later, Braun and his supporters blocked a road that Schudrich was using to leave.

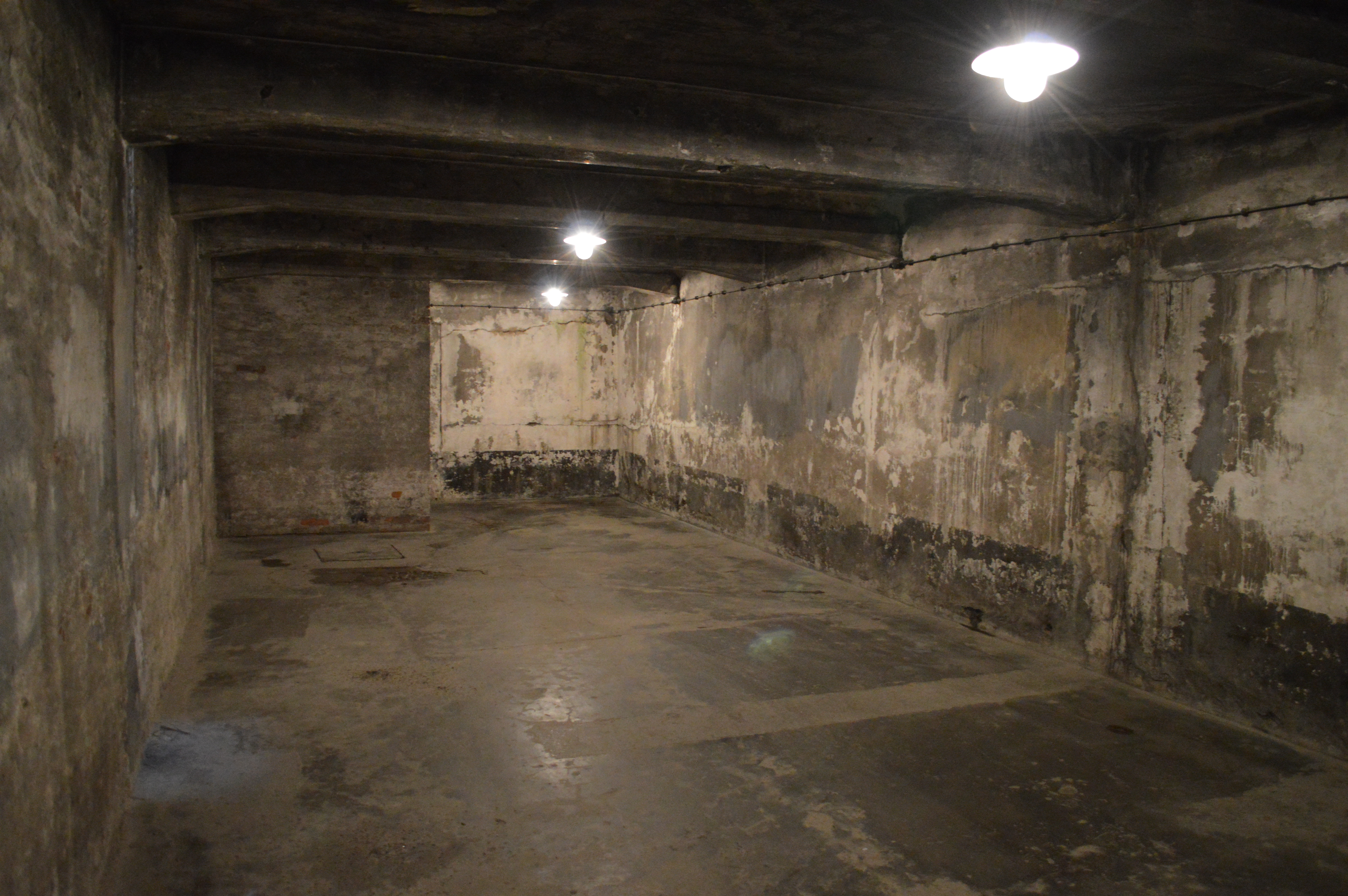
Braun denies the existence of gas chambers at the Auschwitz concentration camp, such as this one, calling them "fake".

In an interview with Radio Wnet on the same day, Braun claimed that the gas chambers at the Auschwitz concentration camp are "fake" and that anyone who dares to say otherwise is "accused of terrible things". He also said that Jews commit "ritual murder", the antisemitic trope of blood libel, citing Ariel Toaff's book Passovers of Blood as evidence, though Toaff has said his work was misinterpreted and historians overall reject the myth, which remains popular among antisemitic extremists. He was interrupted by the interviewer, who ended the interview early, saying that "there are certain limits". A case was filed against Braun by the District Prosecutor's Office in Warsaw Śródmieście under Article 55 of the Act on the Institute of National Remembrance, which criminalises public Holocaust denial, punishable by a fine or up to three years in prison.

The director of the Auschwitz-Birkenau State Museum, Piotr Cywiński, strongly condemned Braun's actions and said that the museum had both filed a complaint with the prosecutor's office and a defamation lawsuit against Braun. Complaints with the prosecutor's office were also filed by the Left MP Anna Maria Żukowska, the Institute of National Remembrance, and the Pilecki Institute. Braun's actions were also condemned by the Israeli embassy in Poland, the US embassy in Poland, the United States Holocaust Memorial Museum, Prime Minister Donald Tusk, President Andrzej Duda, Minister of the Interior and Administration Tomasz Siemoniak, Minister of Foreign Affairs Radosław Sikorski, Minister for Equality Katarzyna Kotula, Deputy Marshal of the Sejm Monika Wielichowska, Deputy Marshal of the Senate Magdalena Biejat, former Prime Ministers Jarosław Kaczyński and Beata Szydło, MEP Krzysztof Śmiszek, MPs Marta Golbik, Paweł Kukiz, Dorota Marek, and Senator Anna Górska. Catholic archbishops Adrian Joseph Galbas of Warsaw, Józef Kupny of Wrocław, and Grzegorz Ryś of Łódź issued statements criticising Braun. The American Jewish Committee issued a statement saying that Braun's behaviour "exemplifies a dangerous normalization of hatred in public life".

Interviewed on a podcast on 14 July, Braun again questioned the usage of gas chambers at Auschwitz, saying that "the hypothesis of their existence in this and a number of other places is a tenuous one, not based on facts verified according to the standards of historical and scientific practice." Two days later, the Senate issued a resolution condemning Braun's words and declaring them to be a violation of Polish law, adopted by acclamation. According to Marshal of the Senate Małgorzata Kidawa-Błońska, the resolution was supported by all parliamentary groups.

=== Iran ===
In March 2026, after the assassination of Ali Khamenei, Braun signed a condolence book at Iran's embassy in Warsaw.

=== India ===
In February 2026, Braun met with members of the ruling Bharatiya Janata Party at the European Parliament, and shared a stage with Dushyant Kumar Gautam.

=== Homosexuality ===
Braun supports the penalisation of homosexual activity. During an interview, Braun equated homosexuality with pedophilia, and proposed flagellation as a possible punishment. In another interview, Braun claimed that homosexual sex is "very risky", "leads to premature death", and "increases the risk of all sorts of diseases".

During a debate in the European Parliament about a Hungarian law banning the discussion of homosexuality and gender transition in schools, Braun said that there are three genders: "men, women, and people with personality disorders". After he was admonished by Vice President Katarina Barley, he said, "Sodomites are, I believe, the missing proletariat in the world revolution that you all very much need to carry out your projects. Keep yourselves, perverts, far away from our children." After this, Braun's microphone was turned off and he left the podium. For a period of two days, he was excluded from speeches and his parliamentary allowance (€350 a day) was withheld.

On 18 March 2025, Braun vandalised a public exhibition in the old town market square in Opole titled "There’s more of us! Provoke equality with us" by Tęczowe Opole (lit. 'Rainbow Opole'), a local LGBTQ organisation, depicting the history of equality marches in the city. He wrote "stop pervert propaganda" in black spray paint on the display boards. He reported the exhibition to the police, claiming that it violated Article 140 of the Code on Petty Offenses, which prohibits "indecent behaviour" in public. In response, Opole mayor Arkadiusz Wiśniewski announced the cancellation of Braun's contract for renting a hall in the Exhibition and Congress Centre for a campaign event, because "we cannot accept evil and discrimination". He said that the city would seek damages of 35,000zł (US$8326.06) from Braun.

On 11 June 2025, Braun destroyed a LGBT exhibition in the Sejm. The exhibition, belonging to Tęczowe Opole, was composed of display boards showing the history of equality marches in the Opole region, which were thrown on the floor, bent, and trampled upon by Braun. He was escorted out of the building by security. As a result of this, on 14 June 2025, Braun was barred from entering the Sejm and Senate Complex. The Marshal of the Sejm, Szymon Hołownia, said that "there is no place for hooligans in the Sejm". He also said that as a result of the incident, he authorised the Marshal Guard to use physical force against people with legal immunity that are destroying property. The Deputy Marshal of the Sejm, Krzysztof Bosak, condemned both Braun's behaviour, which he called "inconsistent with the regulations of the Sejm", and the exhibition, which he said was "in line with negative ideological trends". Minister for Equality Katarzyna Kotula said that she had filed a complaint with the prosecutor's office.

=== COVID and vaccines ===
Braun is one of the main supporters of the anti-vaccine movement in Polish politics.

In September 2021 Braun, in a speech in the Sejm, accused the government of increasing suicide rates in children via their actions to contain the COVID-19 pandemic. He finished his speech addressing the minister of health, Adam Niedzielski, with the words "You will hang" (Będziesz pan wisiał). These statements caused Braun to be excluded from further participation in that Sejm's sitting. Niedzielski, along with the Speaker of the Sejm, Elżbieta Witek, filed to press punishable threat charges against Braun, which were later dropped by the prosecutor citing "no signs of a crime". The claimants complained about the decision alleging insufficient investigation and lack of interrogation of the witnesses. In the following weeks Braun broke into the building of the Health Ministry, which, according to Niedzielski, was connected to Braun's words and his ties to the anti-vaccine movement. However, the court sustained the prosecutor's decision and provided an explanation that Braun's words, while inappropriate, were merely criticism, and that Niedzielski's alleged fear would have been irrational.

A month later, Braun was fined 20,000zł (US$5181.35) for refusing to wear a face mask in the Sejm during the COVID-19 pandemic; he maintains that his actions were "consistent with Polish law". He had previously spoken at an anti-mask protest in Bydgoszcz in 2020, where he compared the mask mandate to the Nazis forcing Jews to wear armbands as a precursor to sending them to ghettos and then to extermination camps.
