= Committee of Grzegorz Braun "God Bless You!" =

Committee of Grzegorz Braun "God Bless You!" KWW Grzegorza Brauna „Szczęść Boże!”
- Abbreviation: KWWGB „Szczęść Boże!”
- Chairman: Wiktor Węgrzyn
- Founder: Grzegorz Braun
- Founded: 7 August 2015
- Registered: 10 August 2015
- Dissolved: 28 November 2016
- Succeeded by: Confederation of the Polish Crown
- Headquarters: 02-672 Warszawa; Domaniewska 22 lok. U-6
- Ideology: Traditional conservatism Polish nationalism Monarchism
- Political position: Right-wing to far-right
- Religion: Roman Catholic
- Colors: Red

Website
- grzegorzbraun2015.pl

Committee of Grzegorz Braun "God Bless You! (Polish: Komitet Wyborczy Wyborców Grzegorza Brauna „Szczęść Boże!”, KWWGB „Szczęść Boże!”) was a Polish electoral committee founded by Grzegorz Braun for the 2015 Polish parliamentary election. Wiktor Węgrzyn was its chairman. The committee's name, Szczęść Boże, referred to a religious Polish greeting that became the trademark of Braun's rhetoric.

== History ==
Prior to founding the electoral committee, Grzegorz Braun became known as a controversial right-wing publicist and film director. He was an opposition activist during the Polish People's Republic, and wrote for the conservative Fronda magazine in the 1990s. In 2007, he entered politics when he sought to run for the Senate in the 2007 Polish parliamentary election on the electoral list of League of Polish Families, but failed to collect enough signatures. He ran in the 2015 Polish presidential election, where he received 0.83% of the popular vote, finishing 8th in the first round. In the run-off, he endorsed Andrzej Duda, the candidate of Law and Justice. During the presidential campaign, he would become famous for his common use of the phrase "Szczęść Boże", which came to be the committee's name.

Despite the underwhelming performance, his presidential candidacy made Braun recognizable. Taking advantage of his notoriety, Braun founded the electoral committee for the parliamentary election that was to take place the same year. The Committee of Grzegorz Braun "God Bless You!" was registered in August 2015, and its candidate lists for the Sejm were registered in 12 of the 41 constituencies (following the withdrawal of lists in the Bydgoszcz and Krosno constituencies). Braun planned to expand the electoral committee into a political party.

In one of the Świętokrzyskie constituencies, the committee's candidate (Artur Augustyn) also ran for the Senate. The committee's lists mainly featured independents who did not belong to any political party, though party activists were also included . In two constituencies, the lists were headed by politicians from the Jedność Narodu party (Tadeusz Marczak and Andrzej Zapałowski – however, the list featuring the latter was deregistered before the election).

In addition, the lists also included several activists from the Congress of the New Right (most of whom stood independently or on the lists of the Kukiz’15 committee) and the League of Polish Families (which did not support any committee in the elections), as well as a few members of the Union of Real Politics, Sovereign Poland, the National Movement, the Roman Dmowski's National Party, Wspólnota, Law and Justice, Dzielny Tata and the People's-National Alliance (Polish: Przymierze Ludowo-Narodowe).

Among those running for the Committee of Grzegorz Braun "God Bless You!" in the Kraków constituency were Ryszard Kozłowski and Stanisław Papież. Grzegorz Braun himself did not stand as a candidate. Sławomir Szarek was the committee's representative in Świętokrzyskie.

In the 2015 parliamentary election, the committee secured 0.09% of the vote nationwide (coming 13th). The movement's candidate for the Senate came 6th out of 7 candidates in the constituency. The committee's performance was considered a failure.

After the defeat of the committee, Braun founded the Wake-up Call (Polish: Pobudka), a grassroots organization; between 2016 and 2019, Grzegorz Braun focused on the Wake-up Call and his writing career, publishing 7 books within these three years. In November 2016, the National Electoral Commission rejected the electoral committee's financial report and deregistered it. In 2018, Braun joined Janusz Korwin-Mikke and the National Movement in founding a right-wing alliance to contest the 2019 European Parliament election in Poland, which came to be Confederation Liberty and Independence.

== Ideology ==
As an independent candidate in the 2015 presidential election, Braun had been described as "as an extremist, far-right candidate whose views were also classified as xenophobic". He spoke for a total ban on abortion, denounced the LGBT community and IVF as "straight from hell", and denounced the European Union as "work of Satan" and "eurokołchoz". Braun's electoral committee was described as a broadly patriotic, national and Catholic formation, and it sought to present an option for anti-system voters. It was compared to Stonoga Polish Party and Self-Defence of the Republic of Poland, marginal parties who also contested the 2015 election; the committee was described as right-wing, and far-right.

Committee of Grzegorz Braun "God Bless You!" declared "faith, family, and property" as its "cardinal values" that need to be protected by the state. The movement stressed the need to protect Poland against the loss of its sovereignty, warning of espionage and desertion; the enemies of Poland were defined to be Germany and Israel. The committee saw Christian and national values as its foundation, and was described as traditionalist and monarchist, with a "romantic rhetoric". Braun summed up its program as follows:

I don’t believe in democracy, because behind its façade, the mafia, the secret services and the lodges are in charge. I am a monarchist because I value freedom and respect tradition. To me, socialism is theft; abortion is a crime. A normal family is the foundation. ‘No’ to the promotion of sodomy. Taxes? Simple and low. Death penalty for murderers and traitors to the state. If you are afraid, you are already a slave.

The main demands of Grzegorz Braun and his movement were: the adoption of a new constitution, the protection of human life “at all stages of existence” (including opposition to abortion, though with the introduction of the death penalty for murder and treason), the protection of personal and economic freedoms, the simplification and reduction of taxes, the introduction of a universal right to bear arms, modernisation of the Polish Army, police, security services and judiciary, “sovereign realism” in foreign policy, neutrality regarding the war in Ukraine, as well as opposition to “ideological invasion, propaganda of deviance and foreign colonialist claims”. The committee also spoke against immigration, condemning the European Union "for forcing member states to accept refugees".

== Election results ==
=== Presidential ===
Election year	Candidate	1st round		2nd round	
Election year	Candidate	# of overall votes	% of overall vote	# of overall votes	% of overall vote
2015	Grzegorz Braun	124,132	0.83 (#8)	Endorsed Andrzej Duda	

=== Sejm ===
Election	Leader	Votes	%	Seats	+/–	Government
2015	Wiktor Węgrzyn	13,113	0.09 (#13)	0 / 460	New	Extra-parliamentary

=== Senate ===
Election	Leader	Votes	%	Seats	+/–	Government
2015	Artur Augustyn	7,916	0.05 (#19)	0 / 100	New	Extra-parliamentary
