= Wiktor Węgrzyn =

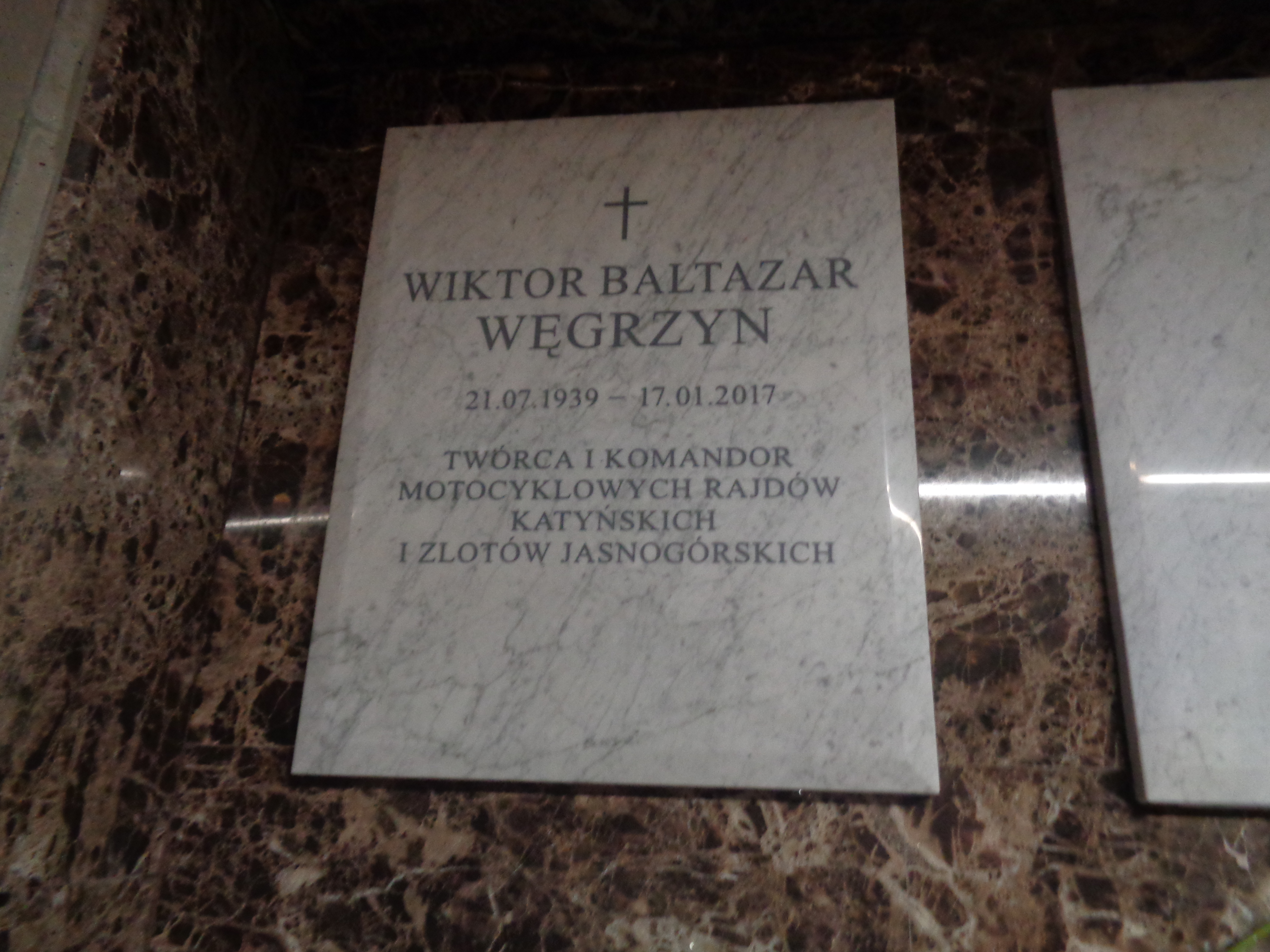
- Wiktor Węgrzyn's grave in the Pantheon of Great Poles in Temple of Divine Providence.
- Born: 21 July 1939; Warsaw
- Died: 17 January 2017 (aged 77); Chicago
- Occupations: bookseller auto mechanic
- Political party: Free and Solidary
- Awards: Order of Polonia Restituta

Wiktor Baltazar Węgrzyn (born 21 July 1939 in Warsaw, died 17 January 2017 in Chicago) was a Polish bookseller, automechanic, writer, commander and the president of the board of the International Katyn Motorcycle Rally, as well as the initiator and organiser of the Jasna Góra Motorcycle Rallies in the name of Zdzisław Peszkowski.

== Biography ==
Wiktor Węgrzyn was born to Anna and Baltazar Węgrzyn. He studied in and graduated from the SGH Warsaw School of Economics. The Institute of National Remembrance uncovered a Security Service report from an interrogation conducted on 15 March 1968 in Nowy Dwór Mazowiecki, as Węgrzyn was discovered to disseminate information about the alleged repressions of Milicja Obywatelska and ORMO during the studenti riots in Warsaw in March 1968. After the local committee of the Polish United Workers' Party was informed of the matter, Węgrzyn was dismissed from his job at Centrala Produktów Naftowych.

In 1973, Węgrzyn emigrated to the United States of America and founded a car repair shop in Chicago. In the USA, he became a member of the jury of Society for the Promotion of Hope (Polish: Towarzystwo Krzewienia Nadziei), which awarded prizes to Polish artists in exile. He also became a member of the Association of Polish Veterans in Chicago. In 1987, he became an owner of a bookshop. In 2000, he returned to Poland.

On 28 August 2010, Węgrzyn was awarded the Knight's Cross of the Order of Polonia Restituta by Polish president Bronisław Komorowski for "outstanding contributions to preserving the truth about the Katyń massacre".

In the 2015 Polish parliamentary election, Węgrzyn became the chairman of Committee of Grzegorz Braun "God Bless You!". In 2016, he became a member of the Free and Solidary party founded by Kornel Morawiecki.

He died on 17 January 2017 following a long and increasingly worsening cancer disease. On 18 February 2017, his ashes were laid to rest in the crypt of the Temple of Divine Providence in Warsaw, in the Pantheon of Great Poles.

== Controversies ==
In 2015 and 2016, the International Katyń Motorcycle Rally, led by Wiktor Węgrzyn, criticized the Polish government for the entry ban imposed on the Night Wolves, stating that two rallies by this motorcycle club had taken place previously and declared that he would light candles on behalf of the Night Wolves at the graves of Red Army soldiers, despite protests from the families of the Katyń massacre victims. For this reason, some of the families of the Katyń massacre victims did not want to be associated with the rally.

In April 2016, he expressed his willingness, along with his colleagues, to escort members of the Night Wolves who, on the anniversary of the USSR’s victory in World War II, would travel from Moscow to Berlin.
