= Marshal Guard =

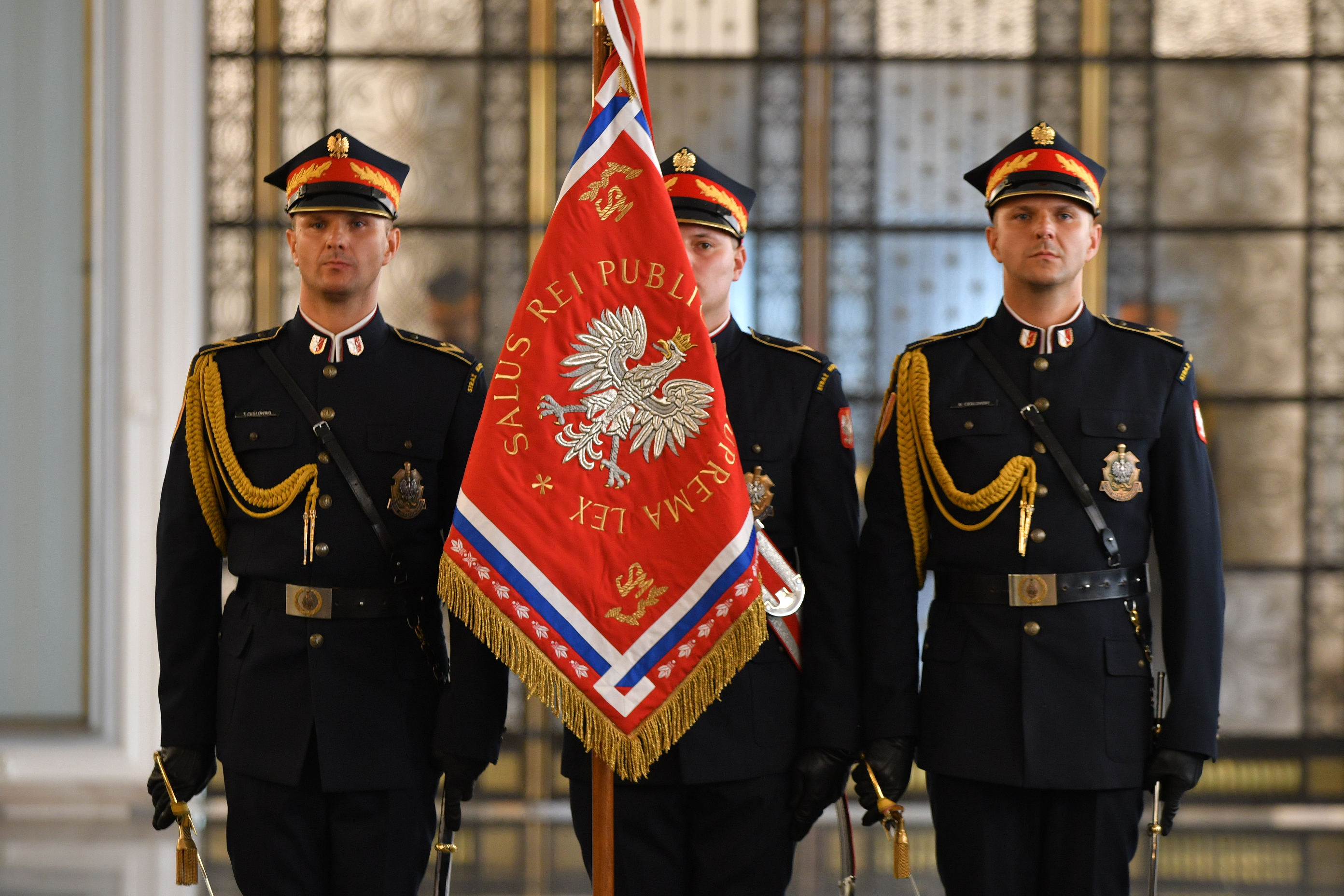
- Members of the color guard of the Straż on 1 July 2019.
- Active: 1947–Present
- Country: Poland
- Allegiance: Polish Parliament
- Type: Bodyguard
- Role: Protective Security/Public Duties
- Size: 171 (2019)
- Part of: State Protection Service
- Headquarters: Warsaw

Commanders
- Ceremonial chief: Marshal of the Sejm

Insignia
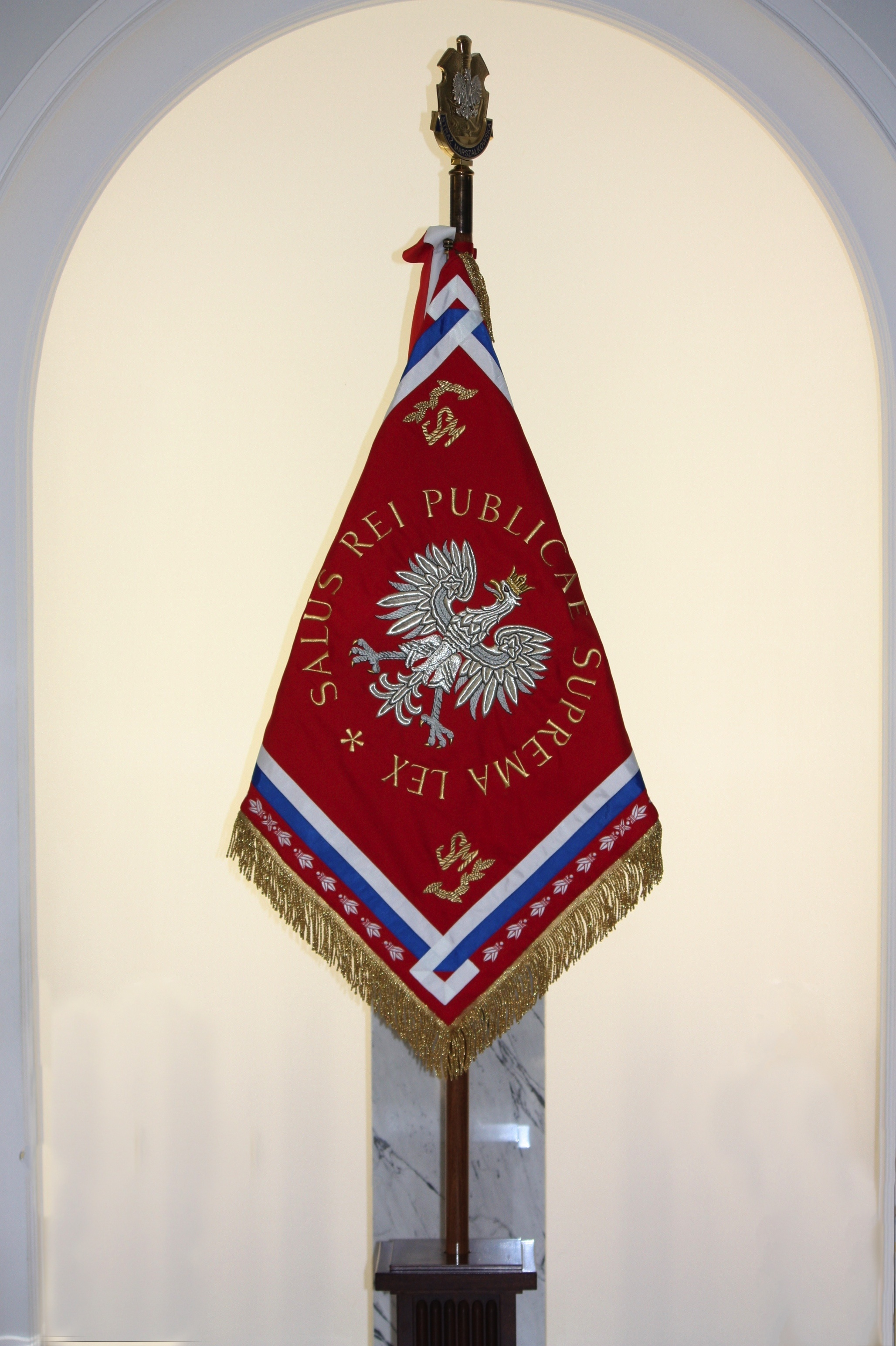
- Standard

The Marshal Guard (Polish: Straż Marszałkowska) is a security unit that serves as the protection of the Marshal of the Sejm of the Polish Parliament. It also ensures that the order is maintained in parliament and that parliamentarians have a calm environment to work in. Besides its security role, it also participates in ceremonial military parades and official anniversary celebrations.

== History and current activities ==
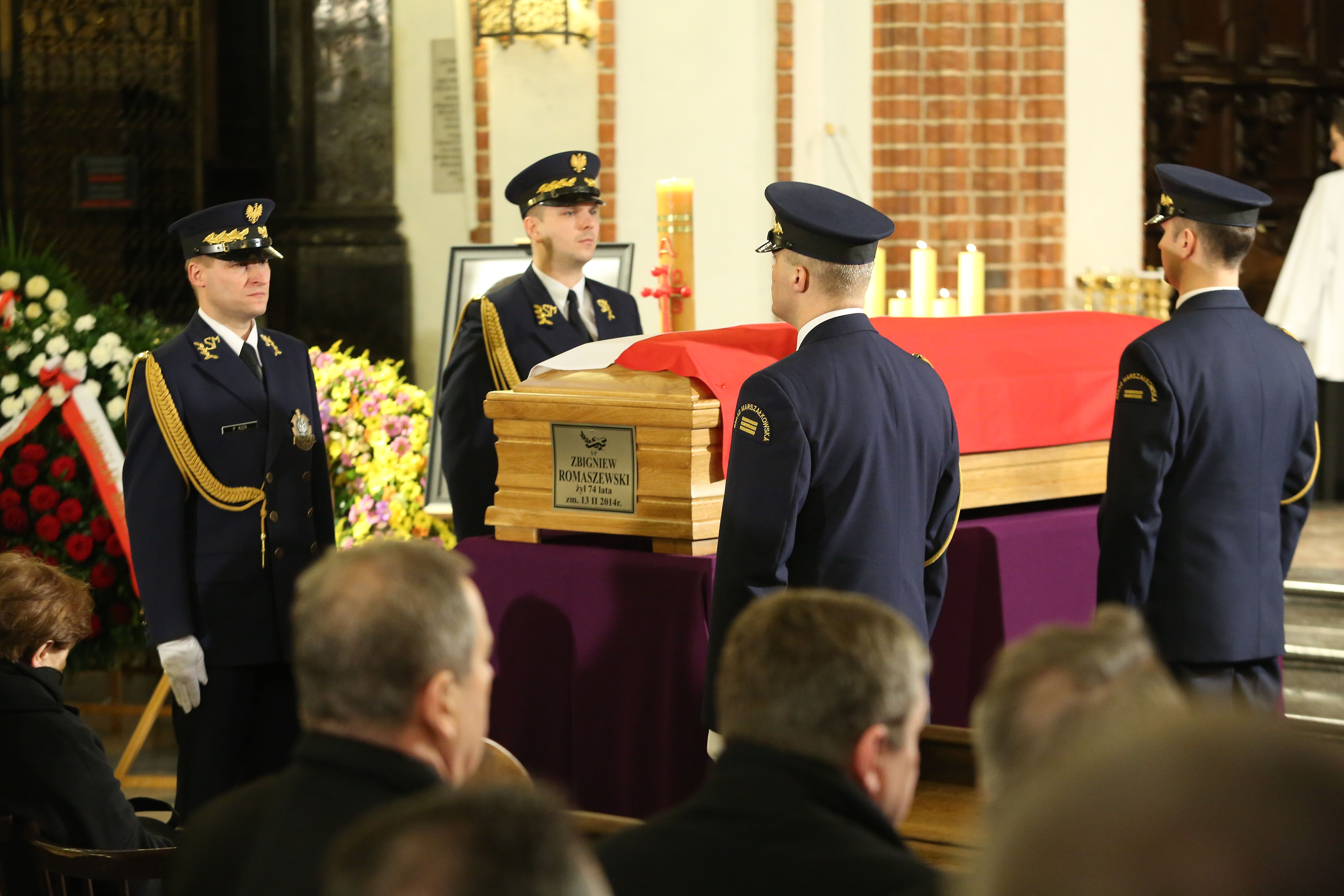
Members of the guard at St. John's Archcathedral in Warsaw during the funeral of Zbigniew Romaszewski.

The Guard was during the era of the monarchy under the authority of the Grand Marshal of the Crown and when the Sejm met in Lithuania, of the Marshals of the Grand Duchy of Lithuania. Then, there was a separate office from that of the Marshal of the Sejm, who was elected only for the duration of the proceedings. The regulations governing the safety of the Sejms and the responsibilities of the Marshal’s Guard were stated in various laws passed by Parliament called the “Marshal’s Articles”, which defined different types of offences and established penal sanctions for erring deputies. In the second half of the 16th century, the guard consisted of soldiers from the Hungarian Hajduk protecting the King of Poland during the Sejm's deliberations, being subordinated to the then interior minister. In the 17th and 18th centuries, the basic tasks of the guard related to the king and the Seym were extended to exercise law enforcement activities throughout Warsaw. After the reactivation of the parliament in 1919, security during the deliberations was ensured by People's Militia. After the Second World War, the modern guard was activated and began its work during the 1947 session of the Sejm.

Today it effectively serves as a police force of the Parliament of Poland, responsible for the security of the deputies and senators as well as of the buildings of the legislative branch. Members of the Marshal's Guard are often seen in the front of the Sejm building guarding the plaque commemorating the MPs and senators who died in the 2010 Polish Air Force Tu-154 crash in Smolensk.

The Straż currently follows the following unit structure:

- Department of Protection
- Department of Security Organizations
- Fire and Rescue Department
- Secretariat

On 11 March 2014, Marshal Ewa Kopacz granted the Guard with its own ceremonial standard in line with the other public uniformed formations. The duties of the Marshal's Guards were defined on 1 February 2018. From 1 February to 19 May, the guard were exclusive officers of the State Protection Service, however, in accordance with earlier Act, they did not have the status of an officer of SOP and remained employees of the Chancellery of the Sejm. In May 2018, the guard was granted the authority to use firearms and armoured vehicles. Since July 2018, the guard has used Hungarian-like ceremonial sabres. The guard joined the National Independence Day parade at the Piłsudski Square in Warsaw for the first time on 11 November 2018, marking the centennial since the restoration of Polish independence, this was the first time it joined a national celebration in its history.

== Gallery ==
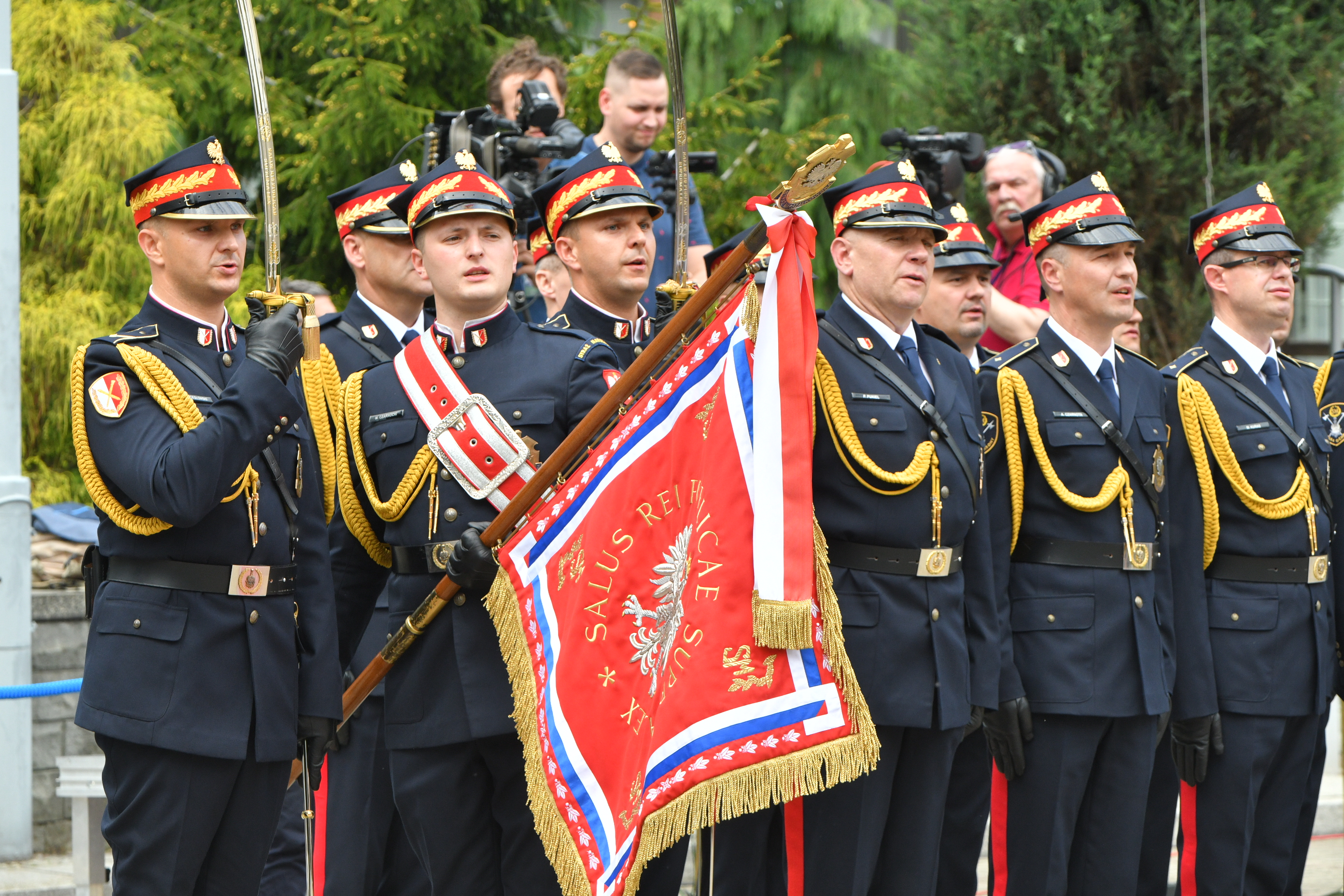

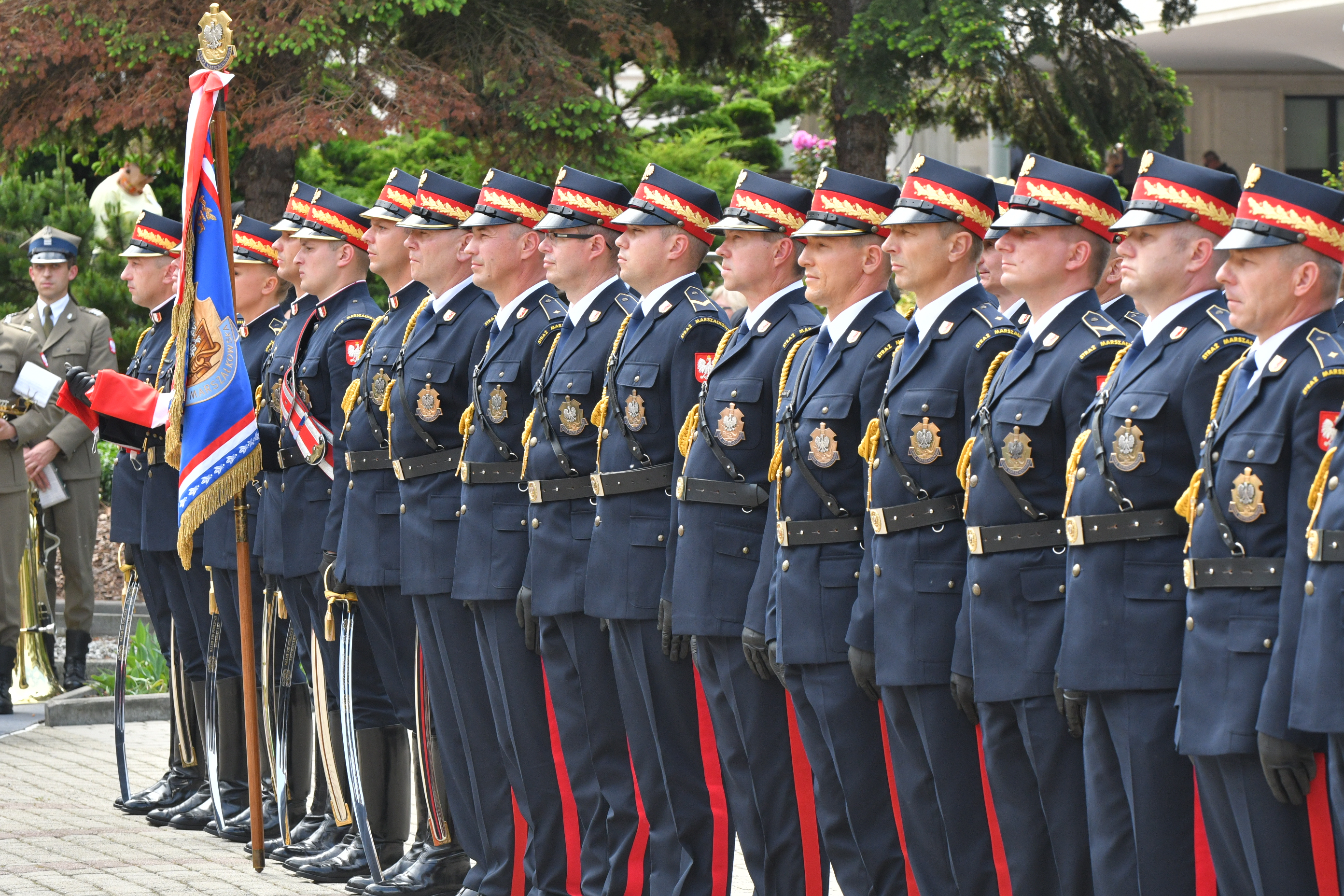

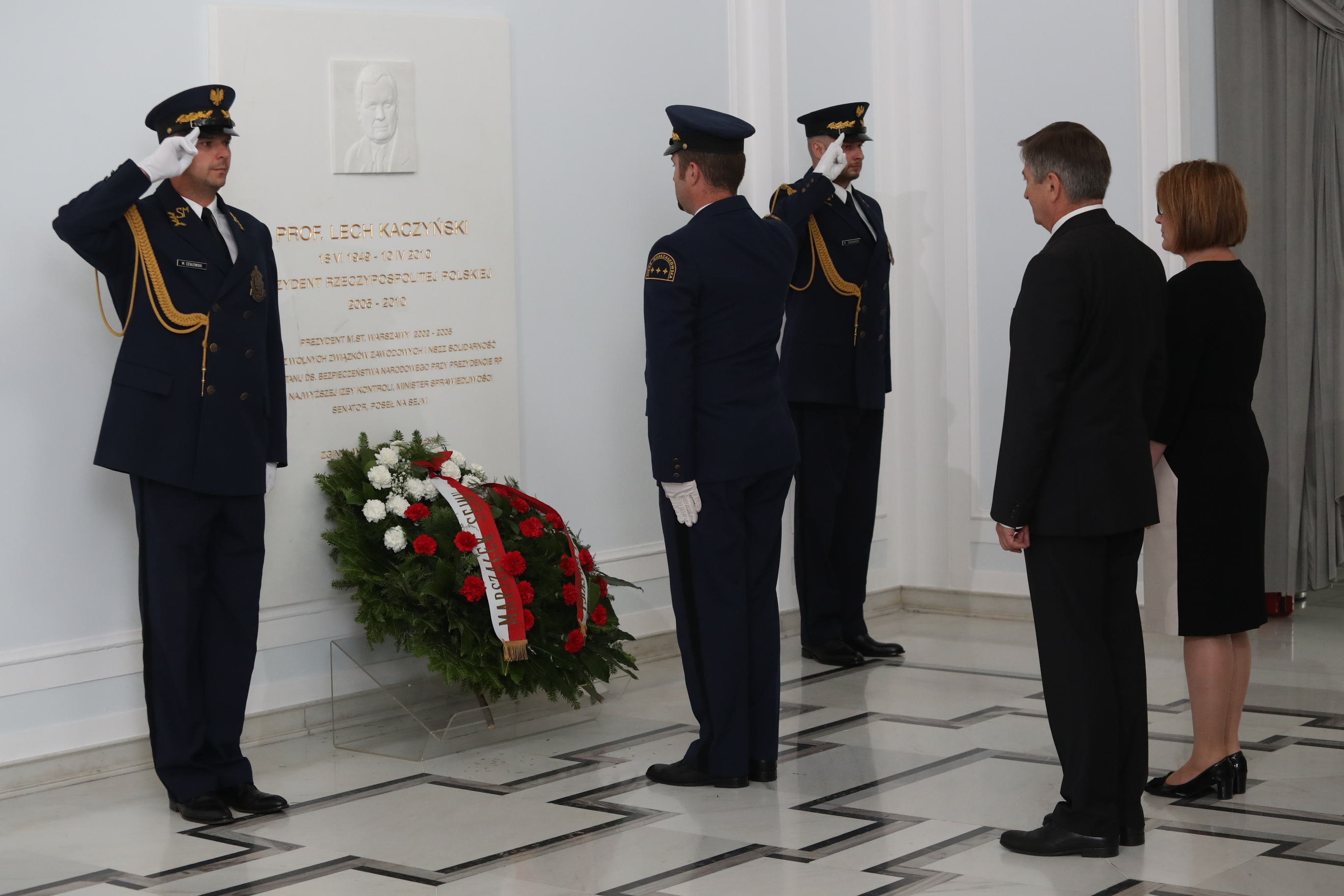

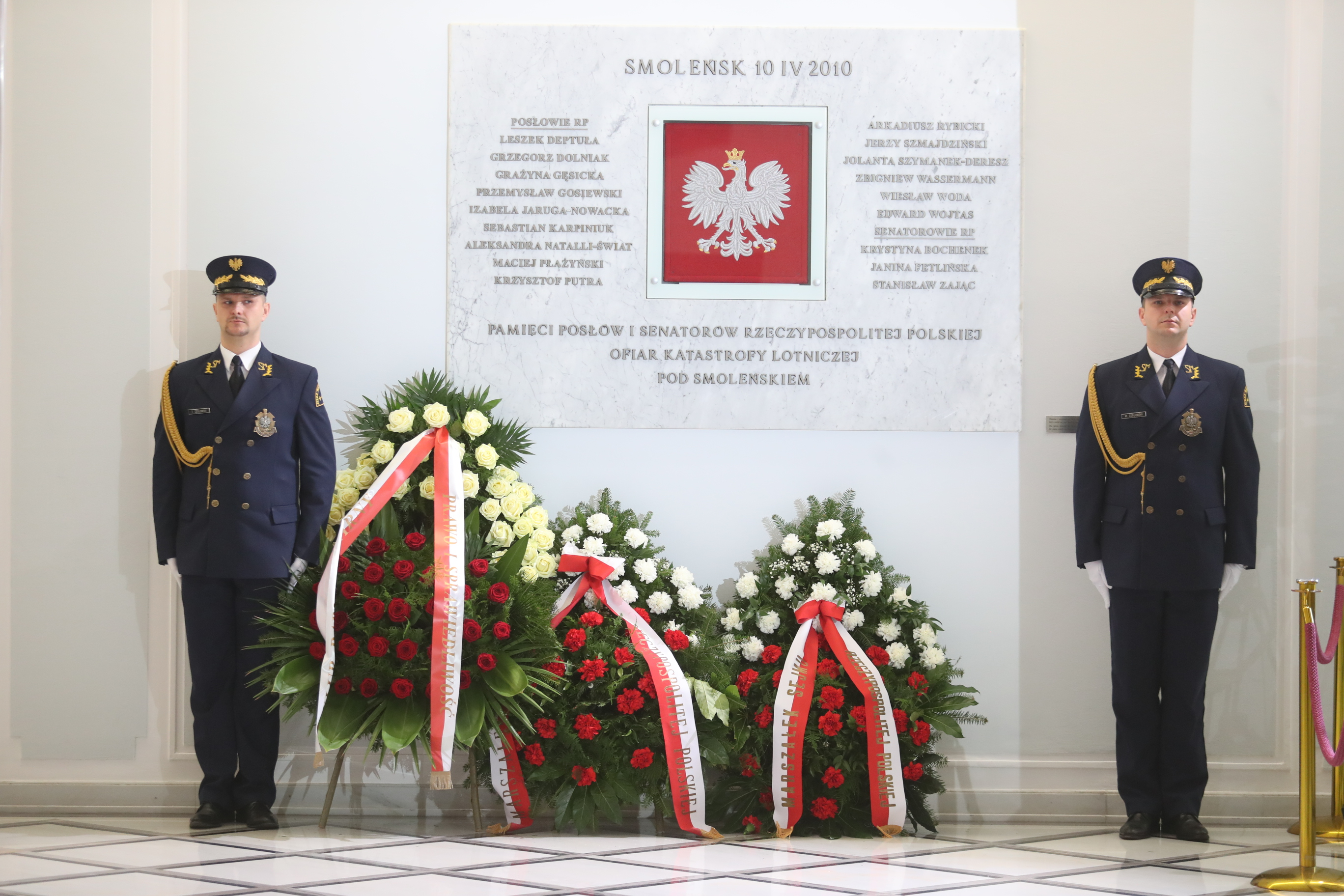

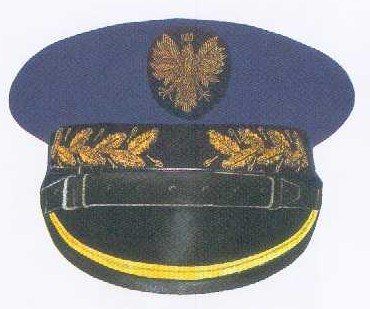
