= Roman Fritz =

Polish politician (born 1966)

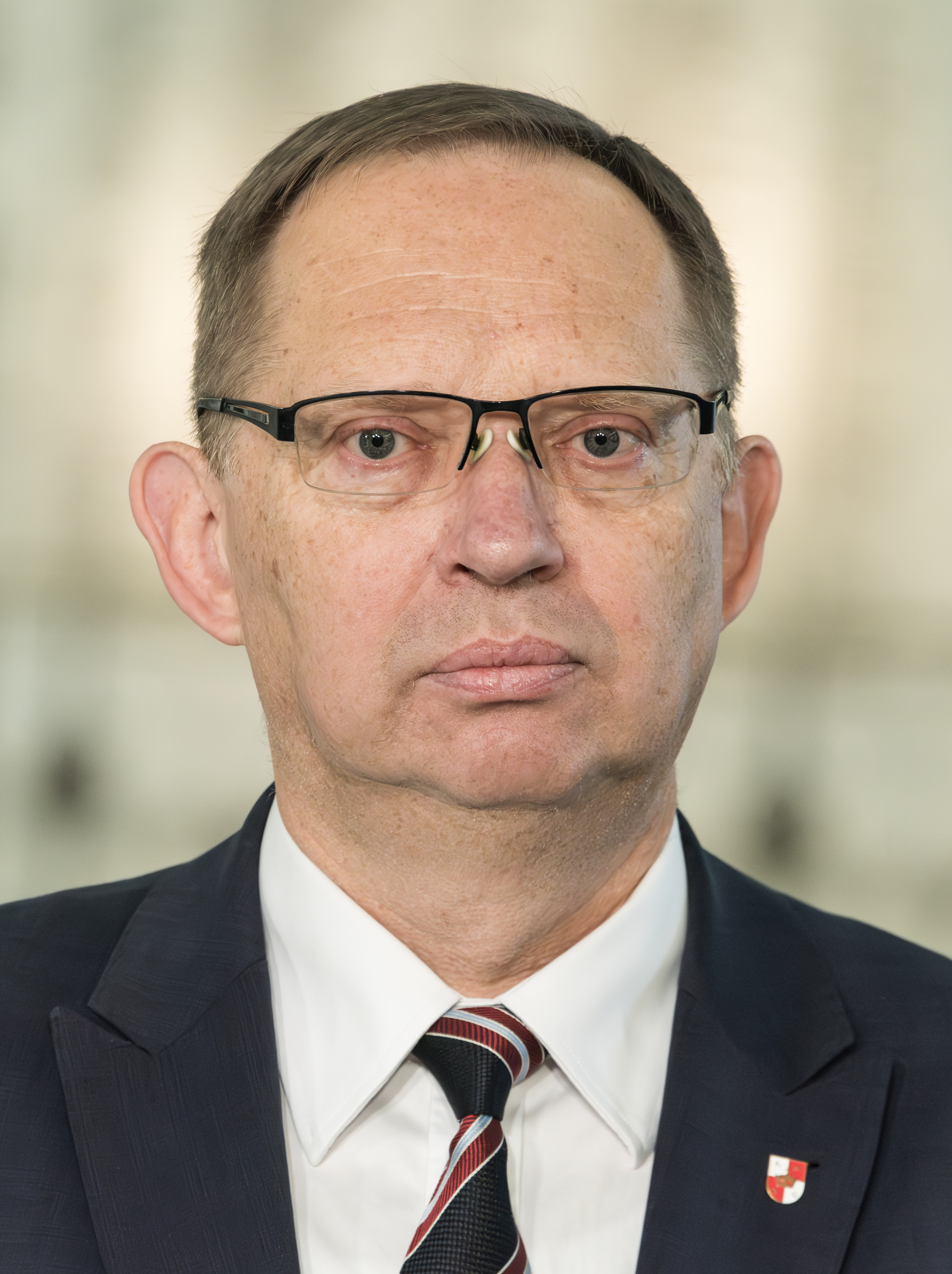
- Fritz in 2023

Member of the Sejm
- Incumbent
- Assumed office 13 November 2023
- Constituency: 30 – Rybnik

Personal details
- Born: 3 January 1966 (age 60) Mikołów, Poland
- Party: Confederation of the Polish Crown
- Children: 3
- Education: Silesian University of Technology
- Awards: Cross of Valour (Poland) Cross of Freedom and Solidarity

Roman Fritz (born 3 January 1966) is a Polish politician and entrepreneur, he serves as a member of the 10th term Sejm.

== Early life and education ==
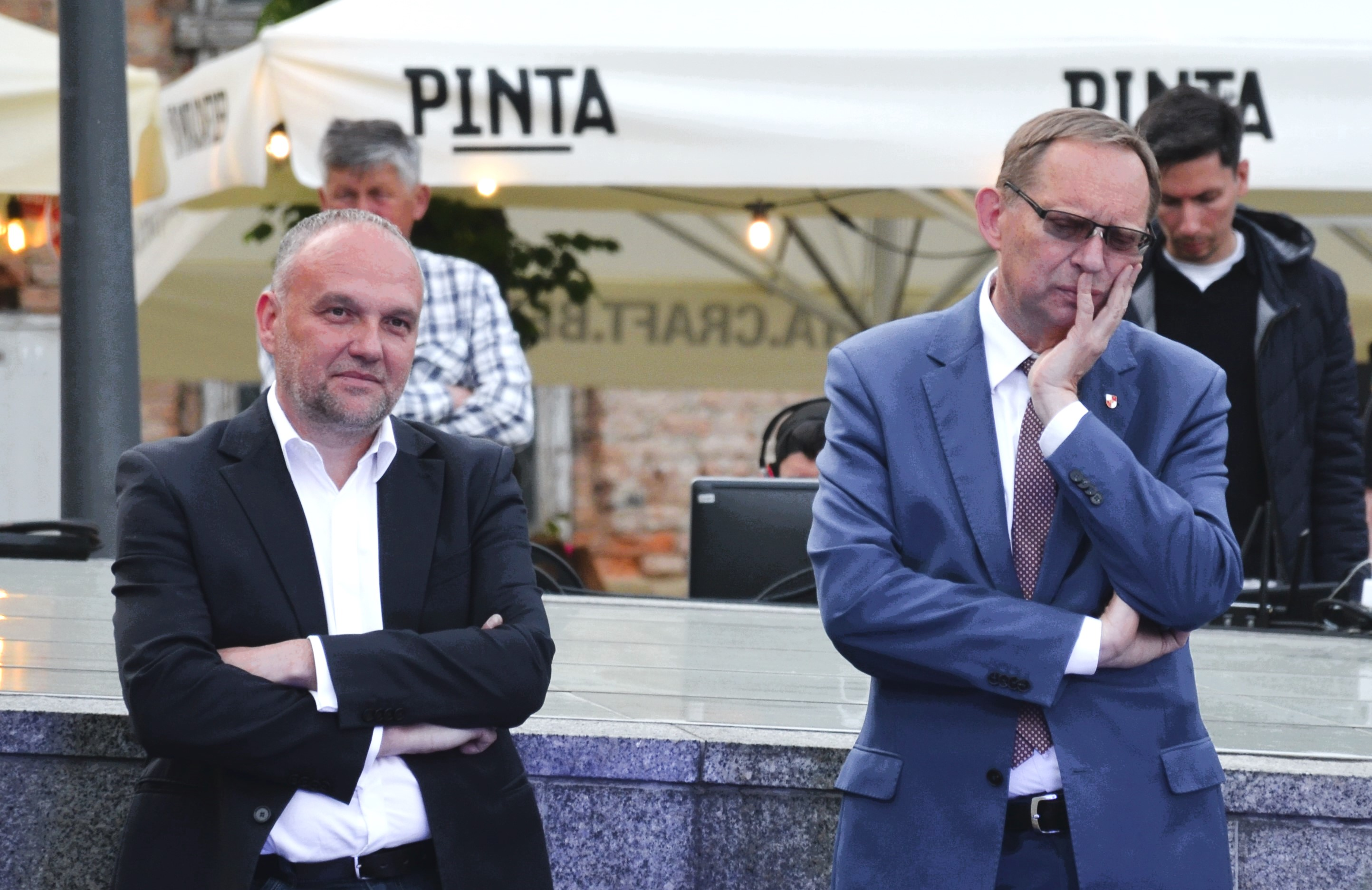
MPs Bronisław Foltyn and Fritz in Bielsko-Biała

Fritz was born in Mikołów as the son of Romana and Alojzy. In 1987, he became involved in organizing the underground structures of the Independent Students' Association (NZS) at the Silesian University of Technology. In March 1989, he became a member of the organizing committee of the NZS at this university. He was also involved in the distribution of second-circulation publications and participated in anti-communist demonstrations.

Since the mid 1990s, he runs Fritz Packaging Systems.

== Political career ==
In 2019, Fritz unsuccessfully ran for the Sejm from the list of the Confederation Liberty and Independence in the district no. 30.

In the 2023 elections, he reopened this party's list in the same district. He was elected as an MP of the 10th term with the result of 11,089 votes. In 2024, he ran unsuccessfully in the European elections.

== Personal life ==
Fritz is married, has three children.

== Honours and awards ==
- Poland :
  - Cross of Freedom and Solidarity (2020)
  - Gold Cross of Merit (2010)
