= Confederation of the Polish Crown =

Political party in Poland

Confederation of the Polish Crown Konfederacja Korony Polskiej
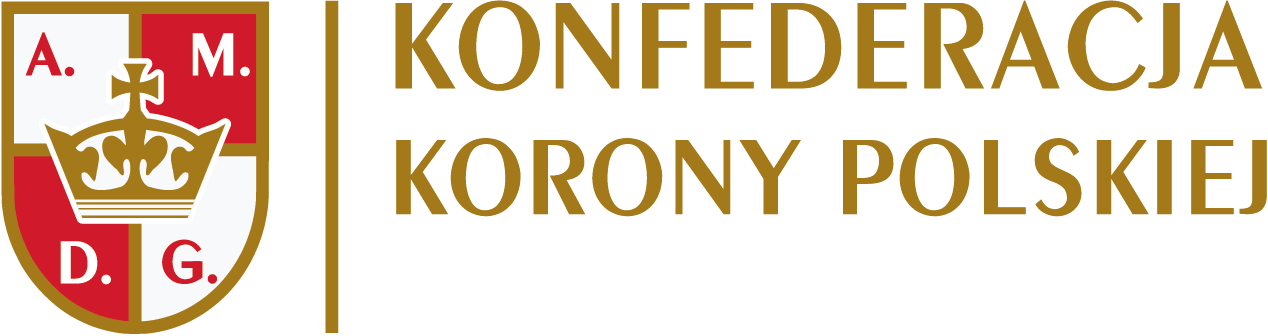
- Abbreviation: KKP
- Chairman: Grzegorz Braun
- Vice-chairman: Roman Fritz; Włodzimierz Skalik
- General Secretary: Jan Krysiak
- Founded: 7 September 2019; 7 years ago
- Preceded by: KWWGB „Szczęść Boże!”
- Headquarters: Częstochowa
- Ideology: Ultranationalism; Ultraconservatism; Hard Euroscepticism; Enthronement; Factions: National communism; Nationalist populism
- Political position: Far-right
- Religion: Traditionalist Catholicism
- National affiliation: Broad fire extinguisher front (since 2025); KWiN (2019–2025)
- European Parliament group: Non-Inscrits
- Colors: Gold; Red
- Slogan: Ad maiorem Dei gloriam ('For the greater glory of God')
- Sejm: 3 / 460
- Senate: 0 / 100
- European Parliament: 1 / 53
- Regional assemblies: 0 / 552

Website
- konfederacjakoronypolskiej.pl

The Confederation of the Polish Crown (Polish: Konfederacja Korony Polskiej, KKP), often shortened to The Crown (Korona), is a far-right political party in Poland. The party was founded by Grzegorz Braun as a personal political vehicle. As such, the party and its views largely stem from Braun's own personal positions.

It has been described as ultranationalist and traditionalist, as well as neo-fascist, and the party advocates for Jesus Christ to be enthroned as the King of Poland. The party's goals are to "fight for the good of Poland, secure the sovereignty of the Polish State, defend Poland's Catholic faith, ensure that Polish families are prosperous, and help shape social life based on the principles of Latin civilization".

Since the party's formation, there have been numerous calls to ban it, citing alleged violation of Article 13 of the Polish constitution. Despite this, as of September 2026, the party has risen to up to 10 percent in legislative polling.

== History ==
=== Formation (2019–2022) ===
The origin of Korona can be traced to an organization Braun founded in 2015 called Pobudka (lit. 'wake up call') as well as his Committee of Grzegorz Braun "God Bless You!", which he used to contest the 2015 presidential and parliamentary elections. A network of Braun's supporters across 41 constituencies, Braun would formally transform his base into KKP in time for the 2019 Sejm election where he would win Constituency no. 23 in the Subcarpathian Voivodeship. The party's founding congress would be held on 7 September 2019, where Braun had one of his supporters, Włodzimierz Skalik, installed as the party's vice president (with Braun being president) and general secretary. The party would be officially registered by Polish courts on 24 January 2020.

At its formation, the party had been in a coalition with KORWiN, later known as New Hope, and the National Movement called Confederation.

Braun was the Korona candidate in the 2020 Confederation presidential primary. He lost to Krzysztof Bosak during the final round of voting and then immediately endorsed his candidacy. The party refused to endorse anyone in the second round.

Braun has been described as a far-right politician, anti-vaccination activist, and antisemite.

=== Russian invasion of Ukraine (2022–2025) ===
Braun is often accused of pro-Russian rhetoric. In June 2022, Braun and a few other members of the party co-signed a pro-Russian declaration stating that the Russian invasion of Ukraine is a consequence of NATO enlargement, as well as Ukrainian language laws that "discriminated against the Russian minority". The party called for an end to the war through the conclusion of a "compromise between Russia and Ukraine". Then in September 2022, Braun participated in an anti-Ukrainian protest, in which he made the following statement: "Stop the Ukrainisation of Poland. Stop the de-Polonisation of Poland. It is about making Poland Polish." This statement was later aired by the state-owned Russian television channel Russia-1. In response to backlash, the party doubled down on Braun's statement; Jacek Ćwięka, the personal assistant of Grzegorz Braun, stated: "And this is the success of our action, which the leftists and liberals can only envy us! There is nothing else left for them."

=== Expulsion from Confederation (2025–present) ===
Braun would again seek the Confederation nomination in the 2025 presidential election, however, instead of a US-styled primary which the coalition had run in 2019 to determine its candidate, the Council of Leaders (which Braun is a member of) chose to nominate Sławomir Mentzen from New Hope even though Braun had support from Janusz Korwin-Mikke. Despite this Braun would push ahead with his own candidacy stating "I will be a candidate in this election, with God and human help." Due to his rejection of a ruling from the leadership council the internal coalition court would vote in favor of expelling Braun and Korona from Confederation entirely on 17 January 2025. Braun, who did not attend the ruling, refused to appeal.

During the campaign, Braun and KKP were consistently given 2–4% in polls, but would outperform these polls on election day, earning 6.34% of the electorate or 1,242,917 votes. This, combined with Mentzen and Confederation also outperforming polls, surprised many because if all Confederation and KKP voters voted for the Law and Justice candidate Karol Nawrocki, he would have won the first round with 50.69% of the vote. This is almost exactly what happened on election day, as Nawrocki won 50.89% of the vote in what was described as an upset, with 92.6% of Braun and 87.2% of Mentzen voters that turned out in the second round voting for him.

On 4 June 2025, the Confederation of the Polish Crown announced the creation of its own parliamentary circle in the Sejm, composed of Roman Fritz, Włodzimierz Skalik and Sławomir Zawiślak. Fritz and Skalik, elected on the list of Confederation Liberty and Independence in the 2023 election, left their party in March 2025 and joined Braun's party as independent MPs. However, since Braun is an MEP and not an MP of the Polish Sejm, his party fell short of three MPs - a minimum amount of MPs needed to form a parliamentary circle. In June 2025, Zawiślak, an MP of Law and Justice, left his party and defected to Braun, granting the Confederation of the Polish Crown its third MP and thus allowing it to found its own parliamentary circle.

Following the party's success in the presidential election, Braun and the KKP began the formation of the "broad fire extinguisher front", concentrating anti-establishment political forces from around the country.

== Views ==
=== Monarchism ===
Despite the party's name, Korona does not seek the restoration of the Kingdom of Poland or any royal dynasty and is therefore not a monarchist political party. Instead the party seeks to "enthrone Christ as King of Poland" as part of the so-called "enthronement movement" which was established by Polish Americans in Chicago which financed "Radio of Christ the King" as the movement's main organ which Braun appears on and the party regularly collaborates with. The network has been heavily criticized for allowing known pedophiles on the air including Piotr Glas. In 2012 the Polish Episcopal Conference rebuffed the movement, saying "thinking that it is enough to call Christ the King of Poland, and everything will change for the better, must be considered illusory, even harmful to the understanding and realization of Christ's salvation in the world." The party had been trying to get Archbishop Andrzej Dzięga to break ranks from the conference and perform an enthronement ceremony himself but he resigned from his position after an internal church investigation into mismanagement in 2024. However, by 2013 the conference formed a committee to look into "intronization" and worked with lay groups both in Poland and among Polish Americans to draft a "Jubilee Act of Acceptance of Jesus Christ as King and Lord".

=== Catholicism ===
While Catholicism has been a key part of the party and Braun's own personal ideology, multiple priests and bishops accociated with the party have been reprimanded by the Vatican or local Church authorities. Braun was personally present at the 2026 Écône consecrations, which caused the SSPX members to be excommunicated, including all clergy and laity loyal to the Society, though it's unclear if Braun himself was excommunicated. Braun states that he emphasizes the Catholic aspect of his ideology because there are too many "pagans" that submit to "tribal chauvinism" among the other nationalist and libertarian circles. Braun also stated that personal freedom, liberty, and the concept of nations as a whole would've been impossible without the Catholic Church and Latin civilization.

=== Anti-Masonry ===
In the party's charter, Freemasons are forbidden from joining.

=== Economy ===
According to Onet, economic liberalism does not dominate in the party, as there is a strong nationalist-populist wing (in the sense of economic nationalism and protectionism), which does not propose policies such as low taxes. The party formerly had an extremely libertarian economic programme, but has since then shifted and aligned with politicians and movements with etatist, socialist or national communist views. Paweł Machcewicz has argued that the Polish national communist movement started by Mieczysław Moczar has continued within the KKP. Krytyka Polityczna has argued that the KKP has become "an ultra-Catholic ‘old-school’ right-wing group" that embraced Catholic or traditionalist economics over economic libertarianism or free market; it also noted that the party's leadership has become dominated by former Law and Justice members rather than people who used to belong to the Confederation Liberty and Independence (a coalition that the KKP previously belonged to), and thus the KKP of the Polish Crown "much closer to the far-right wing of PiS than to Confederation". Conversely, many Korona members oppose Braun's cooperation with Janusz Korwin-Mikke given Korwin-Mikke's anarcho-capitalist views. Commenting on the ideological composition of the party, wPolsce24 wrote:

There are many supporters of Putin and Beijing communists in Braun's circle. It is, however, hard not to be surprised by the fact that a party of which coat of arms bears the motto „Ad maiorem Dei gloriam”, which advocates a ban on abortion, and which considers Catholic monarchy the ideal type of government, takes under its wing people who march in the Black Protests, and who have been hitherto associated with neopaganism and far-left parties.

The main economic postulate of the party is economic sovereignty; it advocates financial sovereignty and 'the inalienable right to issue its own currency'. It declares to be "against usurious and fiscal exploitation, against statism and bureaucratic Talmudism; both against the recurrence of socialism and against the threats of anti-national liberalism, which takes the form of economic and ideological colonialism." Confederation of the Polish Crown argues for a focus on Polish agriculture, stating: "Polish agriculture is like a hen laying golden eggs. It would be very foolish not to take care of them." It proposes to make Poland's food security as one of the strategic directions of state management, terminating 'absurd climate policy', protectionism through limiting food imports, withdrawing from unfavourable EU agreements, and promoting farmers directly selling their produce.

The party is described as anti-migrant, and proposes heavy legal restrictions on immigrants in Poland, particularly Ukrainian ones. In 2022, the party submitted a bill to the Sejm in 2022 titled "Stop the Ukrainization of Poland", which aimed to protect Poland from "fragmentation in terms of ethnicity, politics, and even territorial integrity in the face of a mass influx of Ukrainian refugees". The KKP argues that immigration and its effects must be curbed, stating that it leads to consequences such as "cultural distrust", increasing social distance, crime rate increases, and disadvantaging native workers in the local labor market. The party has also spoken against day care service (żłobek), criticizing policies and institutions that pressure or enable women to enter the workforce.

=== Foreign policy ===
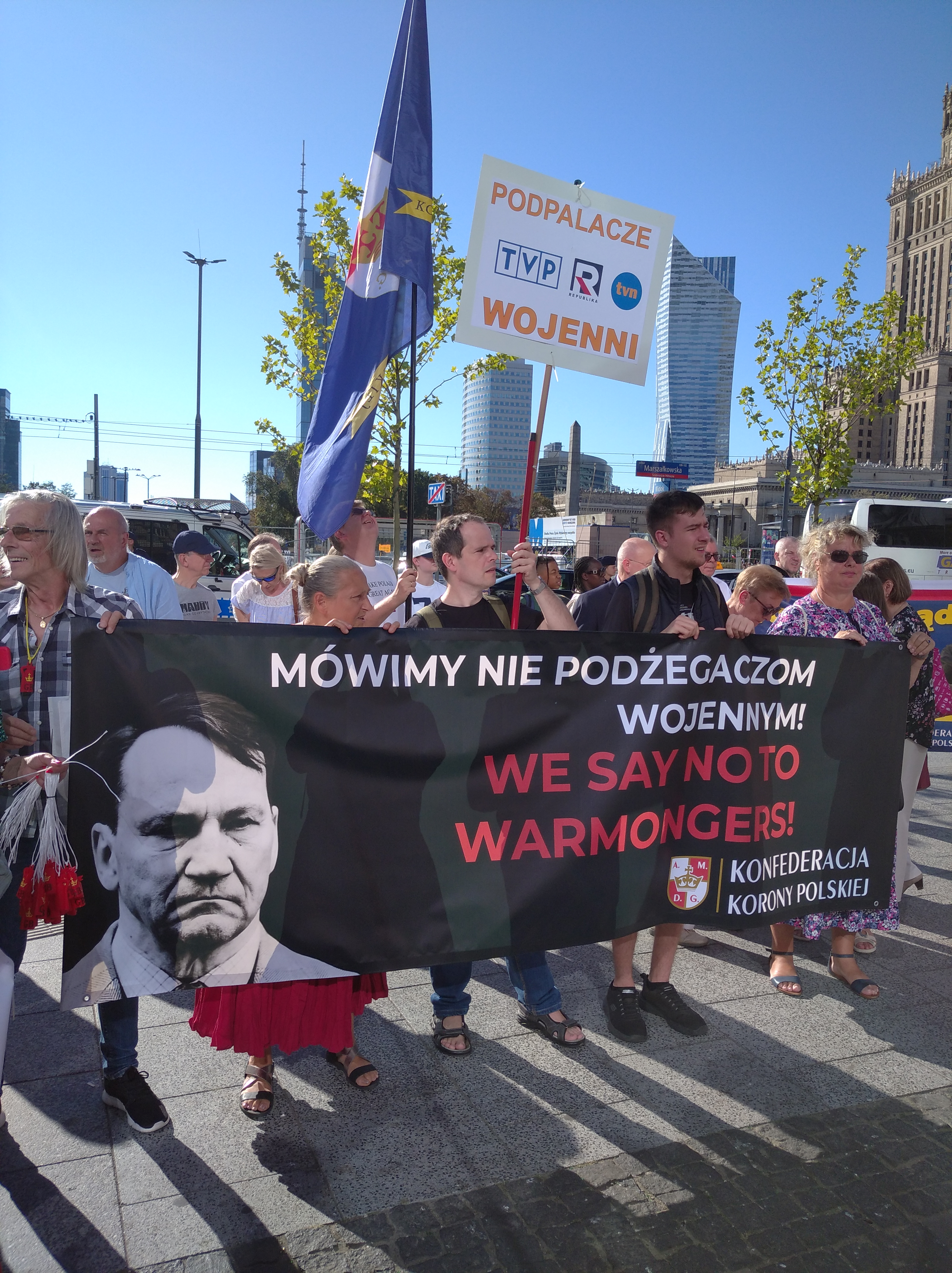
Confederation of the Polish Crown anti-war banner in Warsaw, 2025

The party is considered pro-Russian, anti-Ukraine, anti-Israel, anti-EU and anti-NATO. The party is also anti-USA, condemning the USA as an imperialist empire that "is a political as well as military tool of Jewish blackmail against Poland". It called Poland ‘a Russian-German condominium under Jewish fiduciary government’. It argues that Poland should leave NATO and form an alliance with Belarus, Iran, Turkey and China instead, denouncing NATO as "international Zionist cadres" which are "linked to American imperialism". Braun accused Germany of instigating an anti-Polish campaign of shifting the blame for the Holocaust to Poland, arguing that German goal is to establish a "Jewish archipelago-sovereignty" in Poland and turn it into "Judeo-Polonia" supervised by the US army.

In the Russo-Ukrainian War, the KKP took an anti-Ukrainian stance, denouncing Ukraine as a "failed state" ruled by the "Banderite regime", demanding a construction of a 3-meter fence on the Polish-Ukrainian border, postulating that no Ukrainian refugees be allowed to enter Poland, and claiming that Ukrainian refugees are part of a plot to replace Poles with Ukrainians. The KKP voted against resolutions "condemning the Russian genocide in Ukraine" and “condemning the illegal referenda held by the Russian authorities in the occupied territories of Ukraine”, opposed expansion of NATO through entrance of Sweden and Finland, and denounced the bill labelling Russia a "terrorism-sponsoring state". It worked with the Alternative for Germany and Flemish Interest to organize protests against EU sanctions on Russia, and organized a nationwide "Stop the Ukrainization of Poland" campaign with other parties in Poland. According to political scientists Spasimir Domaradzki and Piotr Tosiek, the party does "not represent an openly pro-Russian position, offering instead an anti-Ukrainian programme".

It has also been described as antisemitic and anti-Israel. It accuses other political parties in Poland of serving the interests of Jews and Israel. Since the Gaza War, KKP has accused Israel of committing genocide against the Palestinian people, and has called for the expulsion of Israeli ambassador from Poland. Braun interrupted the minute of silence for the Holocaust victims in the European Parliament by repeatedly requesting to pray for the victims of 'Jewish-conducted genocide in Gaza' instead. Braun was criticized by other MEPs - Łukasz Kohut called him a "disgusting creature" and Bert-Jan Ruissen called for the "highest possible sanction" against Braun, while the European Jewish Congress described his behaviour as "vile display of antisemitism in the heart of European democracy." Braun responded to the criticism by stating that "apparently all victims are equal, but some are more equal than others". The KKP does not recognize the existence of Israel, considering it to be an illegal occupier of Palestine and calling for a deportation of Israeli Jews from the region.

Regarding the 2026 Iran war, the party expressed its support for Iran. Braun declared that Iran and Poland have a common cause and condemned the assassination of Ali Khamanei as a "manifestation of civilisational and personal savagery on the part of those who committed such an act". He also stated: "The doctrine of the absolute primacy of the claims and pretensions of ‘Greater Israel’, if ultimately it triumphs in the Middle East, will be enforced against us in Central Europe all the more easily and ruthlessly." Włodzimierz Skalik, a party's MP, also condemned the attacks of "the chauvinist genocidal and Zionist regime of Benjamin Netanyahu" against Iran.

=== Minorities ===
The party argues that Banderism, which it described as "brutal cruelty beyond our imagination", is becoming "the standard in our country", referring to the attitudes and behaviors of Ukrainians in Poland. It calls for the need to defend the Polish national identity, claiming that is being destroyed by non-Polish circles. In the party's charter, Freemasons are forbidden from joining. A report by the "Never Again" Association, known as the "Brown Book", alleges that Jews, Muslims, Ukrainian refugees, and LGBT people have been attacked by the representatives of the Confederation of the Polish Crown.

== Election results ==
=== Presidential ===
Election	Candidate	1st round		2nd round	
Election	Candidate	No. of overall votes	% of overall vote	No. of overall votes	% of overall vote
2020	Supported Krzysztof Bosak	1,317,380	6.78 (#4)		
2025	Grzegorz Braun	1,238,462	6.35 (#4)	Supported Karol Nawrocki (50.89%)	

=== Sejm ===
Election	Leader	Votes	%	Seats	+/–	Government
2019	Grzegorz Braun	31,148	0.17 (#16)	1 / 460	New	PiS
2019	As part of the Confederation coalition, that won 11 seats in total.					
2023	Grzegorz Braun	182,573	0.85 (#14)	3 / 460	▲2	PiS minority (2023)
2023	Grzegorz Braun	182,573	0.85 (#14)	3 / 460	▲2	KO–PL2050–KP–NL (2023-2026)
2023	Grzegorz Braun	182,573	0.85 (#14)	3 / 460	▲2	KO–KP–NL–PL2050–C (2026-present)
2023	As part of the Confederation coalition, that won 18 seats in total.					

=== Senate ===
Election	Votes	%	Seats	+/–	Government
2019	144,124	0.79 (#6)	0 / 100	–	KO–KP–SLD
2019	As part of the Confederation coalition, that didn't win any seat.				
2023	1,443,836	6.75 (#6)	0 / 100	Steady	KO–PL2050–KP–NL–LR
2023	As part of the Confederation coalition, that didn't win any seat.				

=== European Parliament ===
Election	Leader	Votes	%	Seats	+/–	EP Group
2019	Grzegorz Braun	621,188	4.55 (#4)	0 / 52	New	–
2019	As part of the Confederation coalition, that didn't win any seat.					
2024	Grzegorz Braun	1,420,287	12.08 (#3)	1 / 53	▲1	NI
2024	As part of the Confederation coalition, that won 6 seats in total.					

=== Regional assemblies ===
Election	Votes	%	Seats	Change
2024	1,042,328	7.23 (#4)	0 / 552	Steady
2024	As part of coalition with Confederation, Agreement and Bezpartyjni Samorządowcy which won 6 seats in total.			

=== Internal ===
Election	Election type	Affiliation	Final Candidate	Number of initial candidates	Number of rounds	Final round	
Election	Election type	Affiliation	Final Candidate	Number of initial candidates	Number of rounds	Electoral vote	Percentage
2019–20	American-style presidential primary	KKP	Braun	9	1x 16 regional preliminaries 7x convention elimination	146	47.2%
