= Patriotic Movement for National Rebirth =

Patriotic Movement for National Rebirth Patriotyczny Ruch Odrodzenia Narodowego
- Chairperson: Jan Dobraczyński
- Founded: 20 July 1982
- Dissolved: 8 November 1989
- Preceded by: Front of National Unity
- Headquarters: Warsaw
- Membership (1983): ~500,000
- Ideology: National communism Left-wing nationalism Social conservatism Socialist patriotism Catholic socialism Endo-Communism; Neo-Stalinism; Factions: Marxism–Leninism; Agrarian socialism Democratic socialism National Democracy; Labour movement Catholic left
- Political position: Left-wing; Factions: Centre-left to far-left
- Colors: Red
- Slogan: We vow to you, Fatherland (Polish: Ślubujemy Tobie, Ojczyzno)

The Patriotic Movement for National Rebirth (Polish: Patriotyczny Ruch Odrodzenia Narodowego, PRON) was a Polish popular front that was the governing coalition in the latter years of the Polish People's Republic. It was created in the aftermath of martial law in Poland (1982). Gathering various pro-communist and pro-government organizations, it was attempted to show unity and support for the government and the Polish United Workers' Party (PZPR). PRON was created in July 1982 and dissolved in November 1989.

The Patriotic Movement for National Rebirth replaced the previous communist-led coalition, Front of National Unity, as the de facto only legally permitted political organisation in Poland. It was marked by a different and broader rhetoric. Communist activists resorted to nationalist, patriotic and Catholic rhetoric, trying to improve the public image of the Polish communist regime and appeal to nationalist and left-leaning religious voters. However, the coalition was not ideologically diverse and was completely dominated by the communist PZPR, with other members of the coalition submitting to its dominance as a condition of their existence. As such, the PRON did not question the communist regime in any way.

== History ==
=== Foundation ===
The initiative was first proposed in June 1982 by the Polish Ministry of Interior, where it would be "a new model of a national front" to replace the Front of National Unity. The idea behind PRON was based on the "transmission belt" concept, which would extend the appeal of the communist regime by building support within Catholic and nationalist circles, which were hitherto marginalized. The Patriotic Movement for National Rebirth was officially founded on 20 July 1982 by the Sejm of the People's Republic of Poland, and was officially declared as a movement that would "organise and conduct a dialogue with society, aiming at agreement and national revival". It was to have a structure based on trade unions, and divide members along their professions and social group, such as "a steelworker, a farmer, a dancer, a professor".

Despite being de facto controlled and dominated by the Polish United Workers' Party, the PRON did act on its promises to promote politically independent activists, along with Catholic and nationalist ones; nearly 40% of the PRON was composed of independent and youth activists. The 'marginal parties', such as the United People's Party and Alliance of Democrats, were also given greater roles.

On 17 December 1982, the first meeting of the Provisional National Council of the Patriotic Movement for National Rebirth took place, with the organization being founded a few months after the imposition of martial law in Poland to build public support for the communist authorities. The PRON was headed by the well-known Catholic writer Jan Dobraczyński, associated with the PAX Association, who was elected Chairman of the Provisional National Council on 17 December 1982. Marian Orzechowski, secretary of the Central Committee of the PZPR, became Secretary General. He was followed by other prominent PZPR activists: Jerzy Jaskiernia and Stanisław Ciosek.

The announcement of the establishment of PRON was made on 20 July 1982. "Declaration on the Patriotic Movement for National Revival" was the work of the PZPR, the ZSL and SD, which were dependent on it, and Catholic associations: the PAX, the Christian Social Association and the Polish Catholic Social Association. The signatories, expressing their appreciation for the Citizens' Committees for National Rebirth (Polish: Obywatelski Komitet Odrodzenia Narodowego), which were formed after the introduction of martial law, declared that "the time was ripe to unite these multiple currents in PRON".

On May 2-9, 1983, the 1st congress of the Patriotic Movement for National Rebirth was held with the participation of 1836 delegates. The following were adopted: "appeal to the nation", "appeal for peace", "letter to Polonia:" and "position of the PRON towards the Front of National Unity".

=== Programmatic development ===
PRON was to be an "authentic socialist" movement, open to those who recognise that "there is no other way for Poland than socialist development, no more certain guarantee of her independence than an alliance with the Soviet Union". The declaration stated that there could be no divisions between believers and non-believers, party and non-party. It advocated unfettered promotion, up to key positions, for independent candidates. The declaration ended with a call to "march together on the national road of revival and development of socialist Poland".

What distinguished PRON from previous communist-led "popular fronts" in Communist Poland was that it fully embraced the 'nationalist-communist alliance' that flourished between the communist leadership and Polish endecja-related nationalists. Through PRON, the communist government "relied extensively on the rhetoric of nationalism, including old Piłsudskiite and Endek slogans, while also endorsing statism and further diminishing Marxist ideological discourse". Utilizing Dobraczyński's connection to Catholic and nationalist circles, PRON promoted the concept of “permissible pluralism” within its ranks, and sought to undermine the emerging Solidarity movement by demonstrating good relations with the Polish Catholic Church, along with making highly nationalist appeals. Though socialism as the official ideology was upheld, the official ideological line of PRON was that "the Polish state constituted the highest value", and Solidarity leaders were portrayed as "unpatriotic" and "anti-Polish".

The organisation sought to further show its staunchly nationalist ideology through the creation of Advisory Council (Polish: Rada Konsultacyjna) in 1986, which included in it radical National Democracy activists such as Maciej Giertych. Right-wing nationalists justified cooperation with the communist regime through pragmatic arguments, sharing the communist hostility to liberal, Western-oriented dissidents and wishing to "nationalize" the communist system from within. The PRON also rehabilitated many Polish nationalist traditions, such as the Polish Independence Day on 11 November, as well as reviving the personality cult of Józef Piłsudski. Nationalist events and celebrations promoted by PRON also included commemorations of the Warsaw Ghetto Uprising and the Warsaw Uprising, previously frowned upon amongst communist circles.

The Political Bureau of the Central Committee of the PZPR, at the request of General Wojciech Jaruzelski, appealed to party members to actively participate in PRON. The PRON's authority was to be built up, among other things, by calls to the authorities to lift martial law and release the internees, and by the participation of people from science and culture in its authorities. They included, among others, professors Janusz Reykowski, Mikołaj Kozakiewicz, Zbigniew Gertych, writers and publicists Halina Auderska, Edmund Męclewski, Zbigniew Safjan and director Jerzy Kawalerowicz.

=== Early activities ===
Collective members of PRON were numerous social organisations, the authorities of which declared their accession to PRON without the knowledge and will of their members. For this reason, already in May 1983, nearly half a million citizens from 75 social organisations belonged to the PRON. The 1st Congress of the PRON was held in May 1983. At that time, a postulate was formulated to establish a Guardian of Citizens' Rights, an initiative which culminated in the establishment of the office of the Ombudsman in 1987. However, Professor Ewa Łętowska, the first Ombudsman, wrote in her memoirs that she had no doubts about the decorative nature of this office. In July 1983, the PRON was written into the constitution of the People's Republic of Poland: "The Patriotic Movement for National Rebirth is a platform for the unification of society for the good of the People's Republic of Poland, as well as for the cooperation of political parties, social organisations and associations and citizens regardless of their worldview - in matters of the functioning and strengthening of the socialist state and the comprehensive development of the country."

Initially, PRON was successful in increasing the legitimacy of the communist government and broadening the limits of public discussion. This was especially visible in 1984 and 1985 - consumer goods reappeared in the shops and the pro-government All-Poland Alliance of Trade Unions was formed in 1984 to compete with Solidarność amongst trade unions. The government was further legitimatised by the 1984 Polish local elections and the 1985 Polish parliamentary election - PRON announced that it would consider the election a success for socialism as long as 70% of the electorate voted. In the 1984 local elections, attendance was 75%, and in the 1985 elections - 79%. This was interpreted by the communist government as having gained a clear democratic mandate to govern. Nevertheless, the government would suffer a series of setbacks since then, given the aftermath of Jerzy Popiełuszko's murder.

=== 2nd Congress ===
On May 8, 1987 the 2nd Congress of PRON was held, at which Jaruzelski spoke about the movement writing an important page in the socio-political life of the Polish People's Republic. In 1987, PRON put forward the idea of ‘arranging agreements on matters most important for the national existence’, and positioned itself - as stated in the Programme Declaration adopted at the Second Congress on 10 May 1987 - as a movement creating a platform for dialogue with the opposition, the results of which would have an ‘impact on decisions in matters important to the country’.It was an attempt to influence various spheres of public life, including the creation of ‘better and better legal and political conditions for the disclosure and reconciliation of the diverse interests of different sections of society’ so that no one would have to ‘abandon their convictions’.

As part of the Polish Round Table Agreement in April 1989 which paved the way for free elections in Poland, PRON was guaranteed 299 out of 460 Sejm seats (65%), with the remaining 161 up for free election with the opposition Solidarity. In the semi-free elections that June, Solidarity-backed candidates won every contested seat in the Sejm as well as 99 out of 100 seats in the reestablished Senate.

=== Dissolution ===
PRON effectively ceased to exist in August after the Democratic Party and United People's Party announced they would be forming an alliance with Solidarity. PRON was then losing its significance. The Commission for the Future of the Movement (chaired by Anna Przecławska), which was appointed on 26 May 1989 to consider the future of PRON, came to the conclusion that its purpose had been undermined. It fulfilled a ‘historic’ role, but in the new political conditions, it ceased to be a platform for ‘dialogue and understanding’ between political parties, social organisations and citizens. It was acknowledged that Mazowiecki's government ‘de facto has a broader social and political basis than our movement’.

This reduced the PZPR to a minority in the chamber and precipitated the appointment of Poland's first non-Communist government since World War II. The political reasons for its existence were no longer valid. The motion to remove the PRON clause from the constitution, which was submitted by all political groups without exception, was an additional factor justifying its dissolution. On 8 November 1989, the PRON National Council passed a resolution to dissolve the Movement, stating: ‘in running the state, the main role is fulfilled by the parliament, the president and the government in which representatives of the main forces represented in the Sejm participate. The government enjoys broad public support. A broader possibility of communication on a state level than in the movement has been achieved".

The decision to dissolve PRON caused mixed reactions, reflecting the current political divisions. On one side were the defenders of its achievements, although aware of the impossibility of maintaining its existence. Jaruzelski wrote that ‘the Movement's achievements in building social peace, in bringing people of different orientations and worldviews closer together, in undertaking initiatives and activities that serve Poland well, are invaluable’. He also wrote to the participants of the last meeting of the PRON National Council: "(...) You have every right to feel satisfied with your achievements and to feel that you have fulfilled your duty to the Fatherland (...) Profound changes in political and social life are prompting you to end your joint work in its current organisational form".

== Members ==
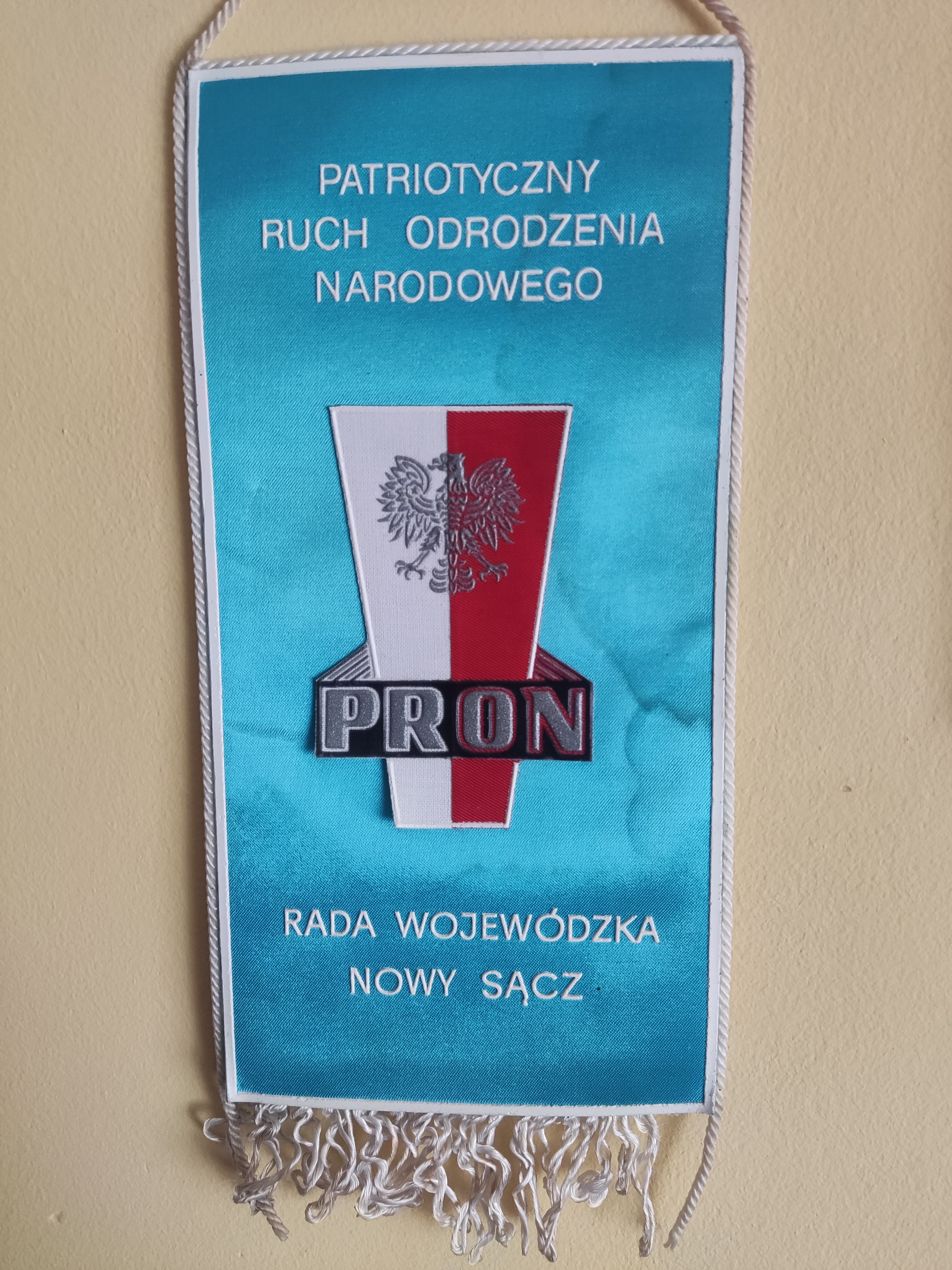
Pennant of PRON.

The Patriotic Movement for National Rebirth included the following member parties:

Party	Polish name	Emblem	Foundation	Dissolution	Ideology
Polish United Workers' Party	Polska Zjednoczona Partia Robotnicza		21 December 1948	30 January 1990	Communism
United People's Party	Zjednoczone Stronnictwo Ludowe		27 November 1949	29 November 1989	Agrarian socialism
Alliance of Democrats	Stronnictwo Demokratyczne		18 September 1937	Still active	Democratic socialism

It also included the following organizations when founded:

- Stowarzyszenie PAX (Pax)
- Chrześcijańskie Stowarzyszenie Społeczne [Christian Social Association] (ChSS)
- Polski Związek Katolicko-Społeczny (PZKS)

It was later joined by many other organizations, such as All-Poland Alliance of Trade Unions, Związek Harcerstwa Polskiego and Towarzystwo Przyjaciół Dzieci. Few members of those organizations were aware of their membership in PRON, as PRON members included organizations, not individuals. PRON membership was required by communist propaganda, and necessary for any organization that wanted to exist on political scene with support of the government.

PRON was mentioned in the amended Polish communist constitution, where it replaced the Front of National Unity. Like its predecessor, it was dominated by the PZPR; the minor parties had to accept the PZPR's "leading role" as a condition of their continued existence.

PRON's chairman was the writer Jan Dobraczyński. The foundation committee included in addition to Dobraczyński: Marian Orzechowski, Janusz Reykowski, Andrzej Przypkowski, Edmund Męclewski, Jan Majewski, Andrzej Elbanowski, Józef Chlebowczyk, Władysław Ogrodziński, Walenty Milenuszkin, Wiesław Nowicki, Jerzy Stencel, Elżbieta Ciborowska, Jerzy Kejna, Piotr Perkowski, Józef Kiełb, Jerzy Ozdowski, Stanisław Jan Rostworowski, Gizela Pawłowska, Zbigniew Gertych, Klemens Krzyżagórski, Anatola Klajna and Zbigniew Siatkowski.

== Ideology ==
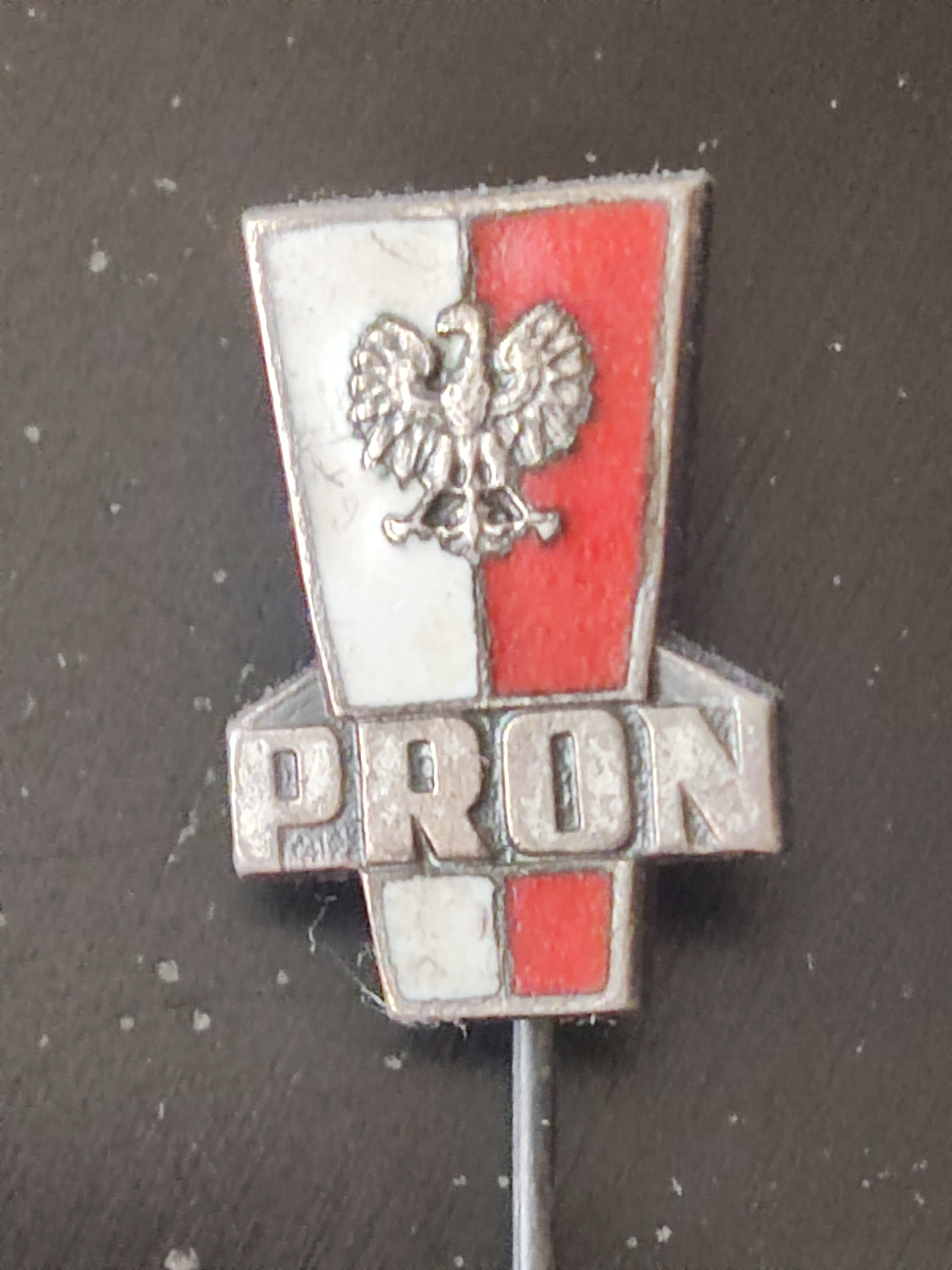
Pin of the party.

The Patriotic Movement for National Rebirth described itself as "a broad and authentic social movement" that unites "workers, peasants, the intelligentsia and all those who want the homeland to be better, who want to turn desires into deeds, and who want to give deeds the most effective dimension." It declared itself open to everyone who "recognise that there is no other way for Poland but socialist development, no more certain a guarantee of its independence than alliance and friendship with the Soviet Union and membership of the community of socialist countries." It also stated that it brings together those "who believe that the guarantor of socialist development is the PZPR, fulfilling a leading role in society in partnership with the ZSL and SD, in constructive cooperation with the associations of lay Catholics and Christians standing on the basis of the systemic principles of socialist Poland".

Unlike the previous communist-led coalition, the Front of National Unity, PRON was broader as it also included Catholic organisations and sought to extend the appeal of the Polish United Workers' Party by introducing patriotic, nationalist and Catholic rhetoric. Nevertheless, the coalition was dominated by the communist PZPR and was staunchly left-wing in character, with other members of the coalition submitting to supremacy of the PZPR. The coalition became active in the field of nationalist marches and commemorations, including the commemoration of September 1939 and adding a nationalist tone to the communist military parades. Polish historian Waldemar Czachur recalls that the Patriotic Movement for National Rebirth ran its campaign with "full military ceremony, with the participation of young people, veterans, representatives of political and social organisations, municipal, city and provincial authorities. Many commemorations, especially at the regional level, were also initiated by representatives of civil society, often in cooperation with the Catholic Church." In this way, the main goal of the PRON was to improve public image of the communist regime.

=== Programme ===
In its political programme, PRON promised to focus on law-and-order, including strengthening the ORMO and implementing additional anti-speculation measures. It also intended to continue working and cooperating with fellow socialist parties of the Warsaw Bloc. It sought to further implement and fulfill the central yearly plans that formed the basis of the Polish state-planned socialist economy, and streamline it by preparing a bill that would counteract monopolistic practices and introduce a strict quality classification of consumer goods. PRON promised an improvement in quality of life by embracing automation and significantly increasing the usage of electronics and robots in production processes, and drafting 'computer-controlled' yearly plans; additionally, it wanted to improve working conditions and peg the increase of wages to that in productivity. The party also wanted to extend the social welfare system by extending the program of aid to farmer families to include farmers' children as well.

=== Political campaign ===
Appealing to Polish voters for support, the coalition recalled achievements of communist Poland, writing: "In the 40 years of People's Poland, we became an industrialised, urbanised, maritime country. The western and northern lands were reclaimed and developed. Revolutionary reforms and socialist transformations freed society from social injustice, unemployment and illiteracy." The party adopted a nationalist slogan and commonly utilized communist youth organisations in its campaign, in some ways appearing similar to the interwar right-wing nationalist activists in Poland. Stressing the nationalist, socialist and also populist character of the party, the coalition used slogans such as: "Won't you cast your vote on Sunday? Poland's enemies will gain!" or "By not voting, you are doing harm to your homeland! Go to the ballot box as soon as possible, be together with the nation."

The party also focused on rural and countryside voters and organizations, seeking to "have the cooperation of all of the progressive forces in the rural environment", and stating that the structures of the Patrioti Movement for National Rebirth were to be primarily based on the realization of the "worker-peasant alliance". For this reason, PRON would allow greater autonomy of local councils in rural areas. It also introduced workers' self-government projects and incorporated trade unions opposed to Solidarność. The party's policies were criticized by the Catholic and nationalist groups within it, such as the Catholic nationalist writer Aleksander Bocheński, who defended the principle of central control of the economy and criticised the concepts of introducing competition and building certain forms of capitalism. Particularly controversial were adopted proposals of workers' self-governments and anti-inflationary policies, which were seen as a copy of Gorbachev's policies as well as introduction of capitalist dynamics into the economy.

=== Nationalism ===
The Patriotic Movement for National Rebirth was also described as national communist and an explicit attempt to attract nationalists, including right-wing nationalists. This was shown by the fact that the chairman of the PRON was Jan Dobraczyński, a Catholic novelist and longtime associate of Bolesław Piasecki, who was a member of the right-wing National Democracy movement in the interwar era before becoming a Soviet collaborator in the 1940s. PRON was an extension of Piasecki's concept of a "nationalist-communist alliance" and "relied extensively on the rhetoric of nationalism, including old Piłsudskiite and Endek slogans, while also endorsing statism and further diminishing Marxist ideological discourse". Polish historian Mikołaj Kunicki compared the rhetoric and ideology of PRON as similar to interwar Sanacja regime - "patriotic, authoritarian-militarist, all-embracing, but also extremely vague".

Despite its appeals to nationalism and patriotism, PRON also sought to gain the support of ethnic minorities. This was made possible by the fact that Solidarność was wdely perceived as a Polish nationalist movement that did not address the problems of national minorities. Solidarność activists in regions with significant minorities paid no attention to non-Poles, and minorities likewise treated Solidarność with suspicion. This made minorities of Poland activitely participate in PRON instead. According to Polish historian Marek Barwiński, the cooperation of national minorities with communist authorities through the Patriotic Movement for National Rebirth was extensive; Barwiński wrote: "Lithuanians actively participated in the Patriotic Movement for National Rebirth (PRON) and completely dominated all offices in the Puńsk commune – administration, militia, education, health service."

=== Catholicism ===
The position of Catholic and lay Catholic organisations in PRON was powerful, and one of the main goals of PRON became "normalising Church–state relations". Its ideology was based on the thought of Piasecki, and as such PRON served not only to mobilize Catholic support for the communist government, but it also sought to "inject Catholic values into Poland’s communist ideology". Its ideology was described as grafting the "Catholic-nationalist vision onto pro-Soviet socialism". It co-opted the 'patriotic-nationalist' tendency of PAX Association, and promoted the writings of its chairman, Dobraczyński, whose writings heavily evoked Virgin Mary and other Catholic motifs and related it to Polish history and nationalism. Dobraczyński had a very strong influence on communist authorities as the chairman of PRON, and successfully pushed the demands of collaborationist Roman Catholics - he ensured the release of political internees, the regime's evolution towards socially conservative stances, reinvigorating anti-alcoholic campaign, and deleting chapters on sex educations from school textbooks.

PRON was also socially conservative. Polish political scientist Karol B. Janowski wrote that PRON showed "significant indulgence towards doctrinally conservative structures", and included socially conservative, Catholic newspapers in its ranks, such as the magazine "Rzeczywistość". In May 1989, PRON submitted a bill for the legal protection of unborn life, which provided for penalties of up to three years in prison for doctors and women. The bill was approved by the Polish Episcopate, but was viewed with reluctance by Soolidarność and other anti-communist circles, which considered it a diversion. PRON sought an overhaul in the relationship between the Catholic Church and the communist government, which was shown in its other legislatory actions - before the formation of PRON, Polish People's Republic formally referred to the Catholic Church as ‘church’, written in lowercase, without the adjective ‘Catholic’. Later, communist authorities also referred to the ‘church and other religious associations’. PRON changed the communist constitution and other documents to refer it to as ‘the Catholic Church’ instead.

=== National Democracy ===
The Patriotic Movement for National Rebirth was ideologically shaped by Endo-Communism, which as ideology was mainly represented by the PAX Association as well as the Partisans under the leadership of Mieczysław Moczar. PRON adopted the ideological foundations of Endo-Communism, including present the Soviet Union as the only protector of Poland against German revanchism and economic colonization by the capitalist West, as well as promoting Polish nationalism. Polish nationalism became especially popular amongst the communist hardliners, who mainly organized through the Grundwald Patriotic Union that continued the Endo-Communist legacy of Moczar's Partisans.

PRON also had the activists and politicians of National Democracy, informally referred to as "endeks", a right-wing nationalist movement, in its ranks. The youth wing of PRON was led by an endek Bogusław Kowalski. Endeks recognized Solidarność as a "righteous voice of workers' protest", but believed that it was distorted by the political ambitious of its leaders. Pro-communist Catholic and endek activists argued that the geopolitical realities did not allow for destabilization of the Polish government. It was argued that Solidarność "was manipulated by Western countries, primarily the USA, which tried to use the Polish political crisis to achieve their own goals in their relations with the Kremlin", and that the demands of Solidarność would destabilise the economy and Polish sovereignty.

== Electoral history ==
=== Sejm elections ===
Election	Votes	%	Seats	+/–	Position	Outcome
1985	20,554,182	100	460 / 460	Steady	1st	Sole legal coalition
1989	4,937,750 (contested seats)	21.42	299 / 460 0 / 161 (contested seats)	▼161	▼2nd	Part of governing coalition

=== Senate elections ===
Election	Votes	%	Seats	Position	Outcome
1989	8,200,944	25.76	1 / 100	2nd	Minority

== Literature ==
- Patriotyczny Ruch Odrodzenia Narodowego entry at PWN Encyklopedia
- and - entries at WIEM Encyklopedia
