= Endokomuna =

Ethnonationalist strain of communism in the Polish People's Republic

Endo-Communism Endokomuna Komunoendecja
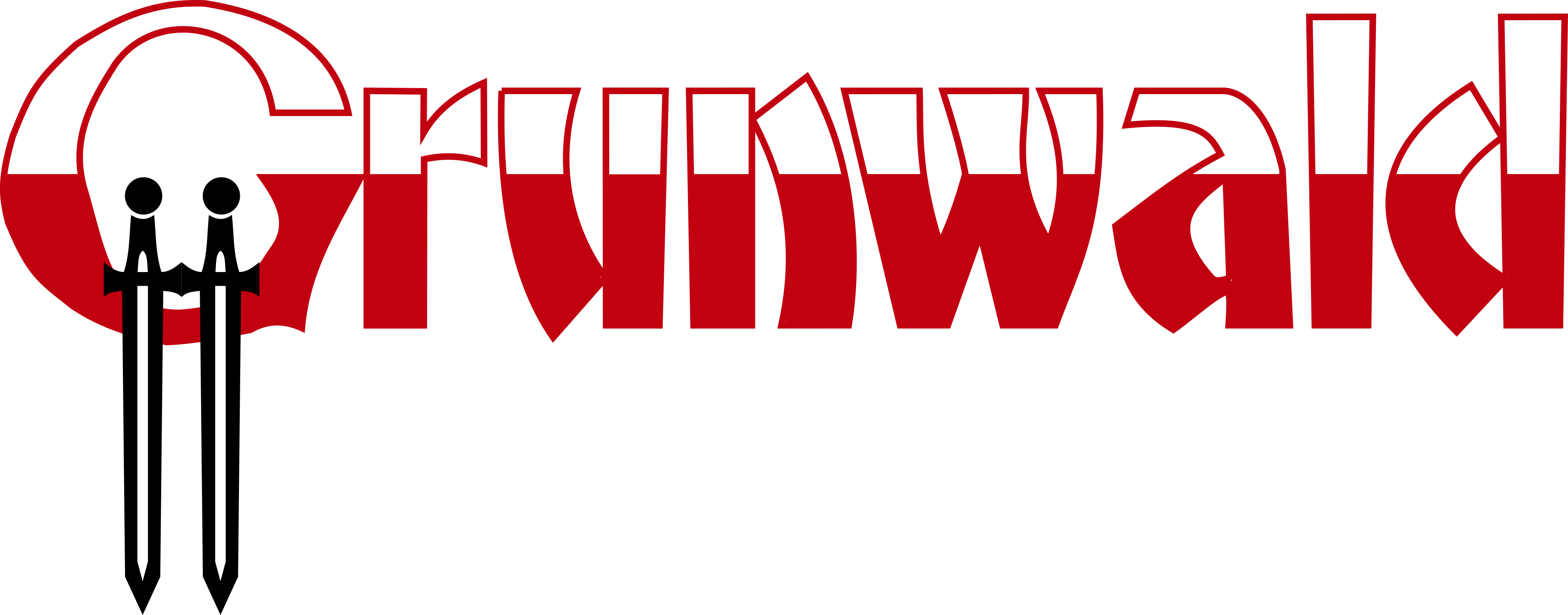
- Logo of the Grunwald Patriotic Union, one of the main representatives of endokomuna.
- Leader: Mieczysław Moczar; Bolesław Piasecki; Jan Dobraczyński; Władysław Gomułka
- Founded: 1956; 70 years ago
- Related parties: Polish United Workers' Party; National Party; National Party "Fatherland"; Samoobrona RP
- Ideology: National communism Marxism-Leninism; Ultranationalism; Catholic communism Social conservatism Neo-Stalinism
- Political position: Far-left
- Religion: Catholicism
- Main representatives: PAX Association; Partisans; Patriotic Movement for National Rebirth; Polish United Workers' Party; Grunwald Patriotic Union
- Politics of Poland; Political parties; Elections; A: Despite the implication of being a mixture of the far-left Marxism-Leninism with the right-wing Endecja tradition, endokomuna described themselves as left-wing in the context of the Polish People's Republic.

Endokomuna or komunoendecja, translated as Endo-Communism, is a term used to describe an ideology within the Polish United Workers' Party, the dominant political party of the Polish People's Republic from 1948 to 1989. Initially used to describe a faction, it is now also used to denote the period during which it became the de facto ruling ideology of Poland. The term itself, endokomuna or komunoendecja, is a portmanteau of Endecja (National Democracy) and komuna ("commune", in the meaning of "communism"). Described as a "peculiar marriage of authoritarian Communism and chauvinist nationalist tendencies", it represented a dogmatic approach to Marxism–Leninism (i.e.: it opposed de-Stalinization) combined with the ultranationalism and social conservatism of the prewar Endecja movement in Poland. As an ideology, endokomuna was considered a Polish form of national communism that sought to augment real socialism with nationalism; it was known for its embrace of Roman Catholicism, fervent anti-liberalism, and the term "banana left" (used to describe socially liberal, privileged left-wing intellectuals). Similarly to Endecja, it was aggressively anti-Western and Russophilic, arguing that the real danger to Polish sovereignty and to Polish national identity was not the Soviet Union, but the Western capitalist bloc.

The origins of endokomuna date back to 1945, when captured Endecja activists agreed to collaborate with Polish communists; the collaborationist elements of Endecja, led by Bolesław Piasecki (1915–1979), helped authorities appeal to Catholic, nationalist and far-right circles. After the Polish October in 1956, Polish government embraced national communism in a bid to maintain popular support; this led to the emergence of the "Partisans", a faction within the communist party (led by the Minister of the Interior, Mieczysław Moczar) that consolidated Endo-Communism into the dominant ideology. Partisans' dominance culminated in the 1968 Polish political crisis, where they led an "Anti-Zionist" campaign against the Jewish diaspora. In 1982, the ruling communist coalition was reforged into the Patriotic Movement for National Rebirth (PRON) that appropriated Endo-Communism and had Jan Dobraczyński, an Endecja activist, as its chairman. Along with PRON, communist authorities also founded the Zjednoczenie Patriotyczne “Grunwald”, which organized National Bolsheviks and functioned between 1981 and 1995. After the fall of the Polish People's Republic in 1989, the endokomuna tendency survived in some parties, such as Samoobrona, Party X, the National Party and the National Party "Fatherland".

== History ==
=== Background ===
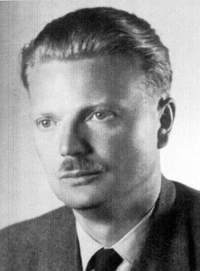
Bolesław Piasecki, founder of PAX Association and one of the main representatives of Endokomuna.

The nationalist Endecja movement, founded by Roman Dmowski in the interwar era, had undergone a radical transformation in the 1940s; during World War II, it was a part of the Polish resistance. At the end of the war, the movement's prominent leaders such as Bolesław Piasecki were captured by the Red Army. While in detention, Piasecki caught the attention of Soviet general Ivan Serov, who praised Piasecki as "genius boy" and held long conversations with him. While in captivity, Piasecki changed his political views, vowing to cooperate with the Polish Committee of National Liberation, endorsing the social and economic reforms of the Polish communists, and declaring his support for their struggle against the "reactionary current in Polish society".

A pre-war Catholic activist, Piasecki proposed that Endecja could assist the communist regime by securing the support of Catholics for the government. After his release in 1945, Piasecki was received by Władysław Gomułka, and put forward his thesis of rapprochement between Polish Marxists and Catholics, which was to benefit both sides and stabilize the communist government. Piasecki discussed his idea of Catholic communism that would consider "God, mankind, nation, and family" its main values while at the same time supporting socialist economic reforms and loyalty towards the Soviet Union. Gomułka was pleased with the proposal, and gave Piasecki green light to founding a Dziś i jutro (Today and Tomorrow) newspaper, organized by numerous Endecja and Catholic writers.

=== 1940s ===
Piasecki's defection prompted other important Endecja figures to approach the communist government. Stanisław Grabski, considered the "nestor of Endecja", became a member of the communist-controlled State National Council, and his enthusiastic appeals for "all patriots to enter the state apparatus and sociocultural organizations" mobilized other endeks (members of Endecja) to join the communist state structures and push for the legalization of the National Party. Despite this, the government never sanctioned legalization of the Endecja party; the fact that Endecja did not found its own party but rather infiltrated state structures directly made them avoid persecution as they were not seen to be contesting the communists in power, unlike the Polish People's Party led by Stanisław Mikołajczyk.

According to Jan C. Behrends, the nationalist turn of Polish communism is rooted in Stalin's reconsiderations of nationalism from 1941; this was reflected in the diary of Georgi Dimitrov, the leader of the Communist International:

We will have to develop the idea of combining a healthy, properly understood nationalism with proletarian internationalism. Proletarian internationalism should be grounded in such a nationalism in the individual countries. Comrade Stalin made it clear that between nationalism properly understood and proletarian internationalism there can be no contradictions. Rootless cosmopolitanism that denies national feelings and the notion of a homeland has nothing in common with proletarian internationalism. Such cosmopolitanism paves the way for the recruitment of spies.

Behrends writes that the Polish Workers' Party (PPR) laid the foundations for Endo-Communism in 1940s by using "the neo-Dmowskian nationalism" in order to both appeal to the Polish population and to justify the alliance with the Soviet Union. The Manifesto of the Polish Committee of National Liberation from 1944, is considered to have already started the Endo-Communist tradition in that it borrowed ideological slogans from the Polish nationalist extreme right wing in order to win over nationalist support. Behrends argues that Polish communists introduced the traditional terms of Polish nationalism into communist vocabulary, and "the internationalists of the past had been remade into Polish patriots". PPR claimed to be the sole respresentative of Polish national liberation and tried to link other political factions in Polish politics, such as the peasant party and anti-Soviet socialist, to the occupier. Polish national communism was based on the idea that there was an extensive collaboration between German fascists and Polish reactionaries, and pan-Slavism was used to overcome anti-Russian sentiments in Poland. An important part of Polish national communist traditional was Władysław Gomułka who "had long fostered his image as a national communist", he advocated "a national road to socialism", ruled out forced collectivization of agriculture, and internally criticized the conduct of the Red Army in Poland.

After the 1946 Polish people's referendum, Piasecki proposed in August 1946 "the replacement of the existing conditions by a new political configuration" to Gomułka which would include a Catholic party capable of "improving church-state relations, moderating the bishops’ anticommunist stance, securing Catholic support for the communists, and serving as coalition partner". This proposal was rejected, but the Polish president Bolesław Bierut tweaked the communist rhetoric on Catholicism, stating that he "acknowledged that the Catholic Church occupied a vital position in Polish history and argued that the government had no intention of altering this standing". In 1948 Poland had undergone "Stalinization" - Gomułka was accused of "right-wing nationalist deviation" and removed from the post of secretary-general in favor of Bierut, socialist parties were consolidated into the Polish United Workers' Party, and the opposition was clamped down on. Despite this, Endecja collaborationists endorsed the course and focused on promoting Catholic-Marxist dialogue.

In July 1946, Kielce pogrom took place, which was an outbreak of anti-Jewish violence targeting Jewish Holocaust survivors. The official culprit for the pogrom was the anti-communist underground, although Jozef Banáš argues that there was also "complicity of the security organs, interested in creating diversion and in compromising the political opposition". He argues that the communist authorities intentionally refrained from combatting antisemitism in order to attract Polish nationalists into the communist party. In this, Banáš identifies one of the starting points of Endo-Communism.

=== 1950s ===
With Piasecki's help, the government signed an accord with the Church in 1950 - the Church had to support the regime's economic policies, condemn anti-government activities and limit Vatican's authority to doctrinal and canonical domains in exchange for guaranteed freedom of religion, religious instruction in public schools, and allowed existence of Catholic institutions. In 1952, Piasecki registered the PAX Association, which would become the centre of Endecja-affiliated and Catholic supporters of the communist regime. In 1956, Poland was thrown into disarray by Nikita Khrushchev's denouncement of Stalinism, which divided the Polish communists into two camps - the Puławska group which favored rapid de-Stalinization, and the Natolin faction that urged caution. This event gave PAX a lot of influence, as both camps were willing to grant it concessions in exchange for support. Nevertheless, PAX found the de-Stalinization "traumatizing" and warned against "excessive democratization" which would undermine state authority and test Moscow's patience, thus siding with the Natolin faction.

Piasecki's support for the Natolin faction, which was considered to consist of Stalinists and neo-Stalinists, helped entrench Endecja influence in the communist ranks. The Natolins embraced antisemitism and Polish nationalism, and rallied against the anti-Stalin reformists not only by branding them revisionists, but also pointed out the Jewish and intelligentsia background of many reformers. While the Natolin faction was unsuccessful in halting De-Stalinization, many Natolins would later join the Moczarite "police faction" that emerged in the early 1960s. Banáš stated that the Moczarites were "in fact a rejuvenated offshoot of the disintegrated Natolin faction".

As the result of the Polish October, Władysław Gomułka was reinstated as the general-secretary and immediately announced his vision of the "Polish road to socialism", considered "a mishmash of ethnonationalism, populism, and communist orthodoxy". Gomułka's rule marked a "renaissance" for Endecja and gave rise to Endo-Communism - PAX was rapidly expanding its membership, and the government also dissolved the "Patriotic Priests" association and put it directly under PAX's tutelage. Endokomuna as an organized movement then emerged in 1956 after Polish October, which put Władysław Gomułka in power. Gomułka's beliefs contributed to the emergence of Endo-Communism - he was accused of "right-nationalist deviation" in 1948 and spent over 3 years in prison, and after coming to power in 1956, he became a champion of a “Polish road to socialism”. Gomułka promised "a truly national communism" in Poland - his reforms included restoring the autonomy and granting concessions to the Catholic Church as well as dismissing Soviet advisers and military officers from Poland in favor of an exclusively Polish administration. His rhetoric stressed the importance of Polish national autonomy, and he sought to legitimatize the communist rule in Poland through Polish nationalism.

==== Gomułka's policies ====
Gomułka's direction of rehabilitating communist system of Poland by infusing it with nationalism was supported by a new generation of party functionaries, the so-called “new class”, that was primarily of peasant background and joined the Polish United Workers' Party after World War II. This direction included appropriating the rhetoric and ideological elements of the Polish pre-war National Democracy movement, referred to as Endecja, whose main ideologue was Roman Dmowski. National communism became increasingly important to Polish communists as they came to rely on it to maintain popular support and national legitimacy. Gomułka actively promoted national communism, arguing that "thinking in the categories of the state and nation... are priceless values"; one of the main national communist thinkers promoted by Gomułka was Zbigniew Załuski, who would become a member of the Endo-Communist "Partisans". In 1957, Załuski gave a lecture named "Patriotic Traditions and the Contemporary Shape of Socialist Patriotism", where, with Gomułka's approval, he declared the Marxist slogan of "workers do not have a nation" to be no longer valid:

Comrades we know that since the times of the Manifesto the world has considerably changed, the international workers’ movement also changed… We ought to remember that we moved quite far away from treating this quote and these thoughts of Marx as they were treated 50 years ago, however, we have not moved away from Marx, but from grasping at half a sentence of his thoughts, and we have moved in the direction of understanding [that] the development of the world went in this direction and that is where our intellectual revisions come from. We have moved in the direction of understanding the second part of the Marxist sentence, because we have observed the process of the proletariat gaining their national fatherlands.

Załuski argued that it was naïve to think that there is a possibility for a contemporary victory for the international proletariat in the form of a worldwide revolution. He affirmed that it was only possible through successive national revolutions. He noted the importance of the "patriotic tie, the tie that binds in some way people who have one language and one historical past, one culture and also one territory", adding that "this patriotic tie has one undeniable value: it exists." He stressed the needed for the party to avoid the mistakes of the rapid industrialization of late 1940s, arguing that it was done without the consideration for the national and local ties, and added that the USSR has likewise made a similar mistake that will from now on be avoided:

Nowa Huta came into being as a great camp of alienated people. And we realized that this process of breaking apart of hitherto small ties, these parish-villages ties, that this process is full of serious dangers, that this process deprives us of something, some order (positive), the order of these people feeling responsibility, who until then felt responsible for their village society. In a word, we came to realize that these small ties, broken apart by modern industry, that these small ties have a certain constructive value.

There is no doubt that the Soviet Union, the socialist revolution in relation to its opponent, against an external enemy was the strongest twice in its history in 1920 and in 1942–1944. These were the moments when the socialist idea, the idea of a socialist state was in some way based upon the retrieving of the national tie, or, the very complicated Soviet tie, which is something more than the national tie, the state tie, a certain tradition of unity between nations, which could be found on the former tsarist territories [state]. On the other hand, in a certain sense, the attempts to build a non-national state led to the breaking apart of this tie, if one may say so, with the cutting off of the whole of the past, so the product of this period is the relatively large cutting off of people in Soviet society and making them into enemies during moments of crisis.

According to Gerald M. Easter, Gomułka and his "Polish road to socialism" marked a point at which PZPR abandoned any ambition to transform the Polish culture or society, opting instead to preserve traditional values. Polish communists rejected the communist ideal of a radical change in social norms, family and interpersonal relations; Gomułka abandoned collectivization of the agriculture and instead "re-enshrined the family" and "traditional peasant villages". Female tractors drivers, infamous in the 1940s, disappeared in favor of laws that banned women from 'masculine' jobs. Welfare and childcare funding patterns were also changed to encourage return to traditional nurting roles for women, including pushing grandmothers to retire early. Polish communists "stopped trying to create an internationalist, cosmopolitan, socialist sbujects" and instead became "national, even nationalistic".

==== Late 1950s ====
Gomułka's policies resulted in the "nationalization" or "Polonization" of the communist party, merging communist and nationalist currents together. The 1960s marked the rapid rise in significance of the Partisans, an ultranationalist faction within the communist party led by Mieczysław Moczar which "represented an even more aggressive brand of red nationalism" than Gomułka. The Partisans came from the high-ranking security and military officers of the Polish People's Army during World War II and later took positions in the military and the police in the Polish People's Republic. Moczar's faction was formed in 1956 as he became the deputy minister of internal affairs, and worked to gather the support of former resistance fighters from both the People's Army and anti-communist Home Army; by the end of the 1960s, Moczar's paramilitary organization, Society of Fighters for Freedom and Democracy (ZBOWiD), had 300,000 members, including 60,000 Home Army veterans. Commenting on the rise of the Partisans, Piasecki stated in 1965 that "the patriotic-socialist forces were on the offensive" and referred to Moczar as "my man". Moczar and his Partisans were the main representatives of Endo-Communism - Robert S. Wistrich wrote that it was Gomułka's national communism that "would beget the phenomenon of General Mieczysław Moczar's "Endo-Communism".

Endo-Communism is considered to have become the dominant ideology in the Polish United Workers' Party by the end of the 1950s. Luboš Veselý notes that the emerging dominance of Endo-Communism could be observed by the shift of the ruling authorities' towards nationalities such as Ukrainians - following a brief period of relaxation in the first years after 1956, Polish communists revived the tradition of Operation Vistula, glorifying it as "retribution" for the murder of Karol Świerczewski and an expression of "justified anger of the Polish nation". Polish historian Tadeusz Olszański wrote that this was the result of "the rise of a chauvinistic faction and ideology in the leadership of the PZPR, which over time earned the apt name 'endokomuna'". Similarly, Włodzimierz Mokry wrote that by the end of the 1950s 'endokomuna' had become prominent amongst communist cadres, influencing towards Polish chauvinism. Endo-Communists abandoned the trend of pre-1956 Polish communists to avoid the topic of Operation Vistula, and instead celebrated it as a revenge on Ukrainians, portrayed as ethnic enemies of Poland. This was accompanied by antisemitic rhetoric and rolling back the gender equality policies that Polish communists implemented in the 1940s.

=== 1960s ===
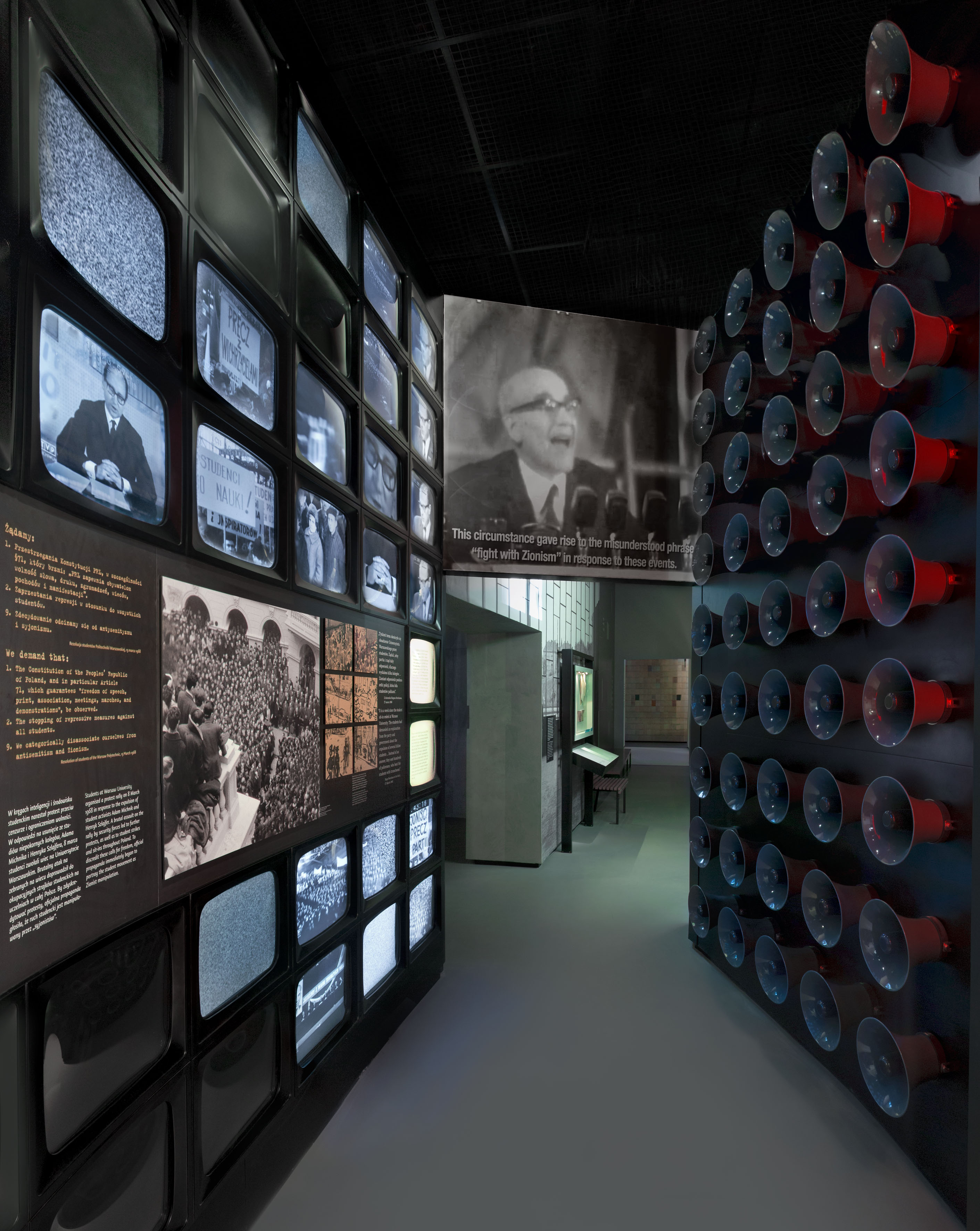
Fragment of the exhibition devoted to the events of the 1968 Polish political crisis at the POLIN Museum of the History of Polish Jews in Warsaw.

The 1960s are considered to be a decade during which Endo-Communism became the de facto ruling ideology of the Polish People's Republic. Michael Steinlauf wrote that since "endokomuna" was no longer a faction but rather defined the character of the Polish communist rule, it can be used in reference to a specific period in the history of socialist Poland. This could have been observed in contemporary texts - in January 1967, S.L. Shneiderman wrote that "the influence in the party and government of erstwhile followers of Endecja has grown to such an extent that liberal Poles are calling the present regime "Endokomuna" (Communism dominated by the Endecja)". The phenomenon of Endokomuna was also discussed in Polish émigré media, such as the French-based newspaper Paryska Kultura; its 1964 issue included a letter from a reader from New York City, Ludwik Słomiński, who argued that "claims that Poland is ruled by Endokomuna are, unfortunately, premature" and that "most Poles would return to their country tomorrow if that were the case". Słomiński lamented that Poland continues to be dominated by "Żydokomuna" instead.

Already in 1960, the dominance of the Partisans became palpable and reported even by international media. In his memoirs, Jan Nowak-Jeziorański, the director of Radio Free Europe, wrote that in a conversation from 1960, Oskar R. Lange told him:

You have fallen into a simplistic pattern of dividing the party into Natolin and the Puławy group. You are operating according to an outdated model of two warring factions. You fail to see that for four years there has been a conspiracy of people with roots in the People's Army guerrilla movement. They have their base in the security services. Their goal is to gradually seize power and the benefits that come with it. The partisans are more dangerous than the Stalinists, because after Bierut's death, the latter had no leader, while the former found a charismatic leader in Mieczysław Moczar.

Moczar was seen as the second most important person in People's Poland after Gomułka. The statements by Moczar and his Partisans appeared daily in the press and television, and their nationalist rhetoric was broadly discussed and analyzed. During state events such as army marches, anniversaries and celebrations, cameras often focused on Moczar. Polish historian Zygmunt Mańkowski wrote: "Moczar was a man of the people, i.e. he had excellent contact with his subordinates, the Partisans, whom he impressed with his enormous courage. He was extremely persuasive in his actions, tall, dark, decisive in his commands and in his entire manner of directing the partisan movements." Under the dominance of the Endo-Communist Partisans, socialist Poland promoted the red-and-white Polish flag while sideling the communist red one, and stressed its national character, always discussing "Polish proletariat" or "Polish communism" in its declarations. According to Easter, the PZPR "glorified ethno-national homogeneity, resurrecting old stories about national martyrdom in the struggle for independence" and promoted "hatred towards foreigners, particularly Germans and Jews". Members of the Endecja movement collaborating with the communists would also attain prominent positions within the state apparatus.

In 1964, Moczar was promoted to Minister of Internal Affairs, and by 1965, several of his men had taken important posts in the military and the police. Moczar promoted a partisan mythology similar to Titoism in Yugoslavia, emphasizing the role of "home communists" in the liberation of Poland. The height of Moczar's influence were the years of 1968 and 1969 during the 1968 Polish political crisis. In the Six-Day War, Warsaw Pact sided with the Arab armies, who had been trained and equipped by the Soviets, and all Warsaw Pact countries broke off relations with Israel. Israeli victory was celebrated by Polish Jews and anti-communist activists - Mieczysław Rakowski noted: "The prevailing mood in our society is satisfaction that ‘our’ Jews are beating ‘Russian’ Arabs". Polish Jews "accused the Soviet Union of supporting fascist Nasser" and attacked Polish leadership as well. Gomułka reacted to the news with fury, comparing Israeli soldiers to SS men and declaring: "We will not ignore such events as drunken orgies that took place in some institutions to celebrate the victory of Israel." He spoke of the need to eliminate "Zionist circles among Polish citizens".

Gomułka approved of Moczar's plan to carry out an "anti-Zionist" campaign where Jews suspected of Zionist sympathies were to be purged from public institutions. Initially, the purge was selective and affected mostly army structure and local party organizations. However, Mikołaj Stanisław Kunicki notes that the limited purge escalated tensions across the country: "The removal of Jews from public institutions, a state of ferment among liberal intellectuals and students, an aggressive mood in the party and security apparatus, and the impact of democratization in Czechoslovakia: all these factors produced a situation in which a little spark could set off a major political crisis. As often happens in history, the final eruption was caused by a seemingly marginal event." This marginal event were student protests organized against the government's decision to ban Dziady by Adam Mickiewicz, a 19th-century Polish national epic which the authorities accused of inspiring "behavior hostile to Poland's 'eastern ally'". The protests soon became full-fledged political movement for political and cultural reform.

The Partisans crushed the protests, forcibly dissolving related organizations and either imprisoning or exiling its leaders. The Partisans fought to win over popular support by emphasizing that they were the 'fighters and patriots' of the anti-Nazi resistance, contrasted with the protesting students which the Partisans condemned as "banana left" (implying privileged consumption of delicacies such as bananas). The protests also resulted in a massive escalation of the anti-Zionist purges - mass meetings were called at workplaces to denounce Zionism, and Jewish employes were often "unmasked" and fired. This extended the campaign to every workplaces, and as the result even factory workers or lower-level Jewish workers were fired. Unable to find work, dismissed Jews were permitted to leave Poland under condition of surrendering their Polish citizenship in exchange for an exit permit valid only for Israel. Over 25,000 Jews took this option, which the government showed as a "proof" of the Polish Jews' allegiance to Israel over Poland.

Another struggle led by the Partisans was against the so-called Encyclopedists (Polish: Encyklopedyści), editors of the 8th volume of the prestigious Great Universal Encyclopedia (Polish: Wielka Encyklopedia Powszechna). In its 8th volume, the encyclopedia discussed the Nazi occupation of Poland, and made a differentation between "concentration camps" where prisoners lived and worked under conditions designed to hasten death, and "annihilation camps", of which the only purpose was murder and of which nearly all victims were Jews. The Partisans led the wave of demonstrations which accused the editors of denying Polish martyrdom of World War II. Most of the encyclopedia's staff members (some of whom were Jewish) were dismissed, and the government released a "corrected" article which stated that all Nazi camps were intended to exterminate everyone who passed through their gates, Poles or Jews. The corrected article wrote that the German occupation was "the most tragic period in the history of the Polish nation" and added that "the extermination plans of the Nazi occupier assumed the physical annihilation of the Polish population—Poles as well as national minorities: Jews, Ukrainians, Belorussians, Gypsies". Starting in 1968, the government also issued pamphlets where it described the prewar Polish Jewish community as controlled by "bourgeois" and "Zionist" elements.

=== 1970s ===
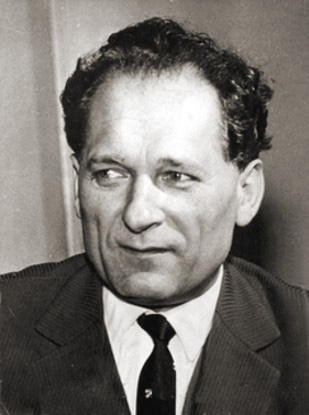
Mieczysław Moczar, the leader of the Endo-Communist "Partisans" faction in 1965, at the height of his political power.

The anti-Zionist campaign was considered a part of a political struggle, as it was speculated that Moczar tried to replace Gomułka as the general-secretary. According to Richard S. Levy, Moczar and his Endo-Communist Partisans tried to replace Gomułka by winning support from Kremlin which was "already unhappy with Gomułka's failing liberalism", but Gomułka managed to outmaneuver Moczar by sending forces to the Warsaw Pact invasion of Czechoslovakia and co-opting the anti-Zionist campaign. However, Marcin Zaremba argues that both Moczar and Gomułka "both knew each other from the Communist resistance, which was not insignificant, because it created a bond of a specific character, extremely strong, based upon boundless trust, which is indispensable in a situation of constant threat". He added that both men faced accusations of "right-wing nationalist deviation" before, and the Gomułka's national communism was quite similar to Endo-Communism promoted by Moczar. Nevertheless, after 1968, the influence of both Moczar and Gomułka waned, and Gomułka was dismissed by the party in 1970, and was replaced by Silesian Edward Gierek.

Under Gierek, while the influence of Endo-Communism itself waned, its rhetoric was utilized by the authorities more than before. In fact, Piasecki wrote in 1972: "This is the best leadership of the party and the state we have ever had in the history of People's Poland." Gierek was pragmatic and focused his efforts on improving the economy, seeing it as the basis of the communist party maintaining its rule in Poland. Gierek courted the Catholic Church and nationalist circles, but did so on pragmatic basis. On the other hand, Gierek also pursued partial liberalization, opening Poland to trade with the West and Western influences - Poles would start travelling to other countries en masse, and products of Western mass culture became available in general circulation, along with Western movies and popular music.

Gierek's rule was compared to goulash communism, given his reformist-leaning economic policies, humility and populism. He courted the Catholic Church, offering more building permits for churches and stating his openness to inviting the pope to visit Poland. In December 1977, Gierek traveled to Vatican and met the pope, becoming the first Polish communist leader to do so. Karol Wojtyła, the Archbishop of Kraków who later became Pope John Paul II, praised Gierek as a wise leader, stating that Gierek would have received the help of the Polish episcopate, had he ever needed it. Wojtyła also argued that Gierek should be remembered as the communist leader of Poland "who started to pursue a reasonable policy towards the Church". Archbishop of Wrocław Bolesław Kominek expressed a similar view, stating that Gierek "spoke very reasonably" and that he was much more connected to the people than previous authorities of the Polish People's Republic. In the 1970s, Kominek described Gierek as follows: "He is surrounded by the people and the workers. He is more practical than Gomułka, he is more educated, he knows foreign languages, he spent years in France and Belgium; he has a broader horizon of thought; he was able to establish relations with the Church in Silesia."

Rhetorically, Gierek turned away from communism and towards nationalism - in one of his speeches, he remarked: "Our steps stemmed from the concept of widening the social base of power, therefore in moving away from the dictatorship of the proletariat in the direction of a general national-state." Proletarian rhetoric was largely replaced by calls for national solidarity, but this did not mean abandonment of Marxism–Leninism; Gierek stated: "The historical process of identifying the new socialist Polish nation, a nation of working people, with the people's state was led by, inspired, and directed by our Marxist–Leninist party of the working class." He presented socialism as patriotic, arguing that "socialism ensured Poland's return to its ancient Piast lands on the Oder and the Baltic, once severed by violence, and made possible the rebuilding of a single, compact, Polish nation-state". Particular for Gierek was his usage of Polish pre-WWI history - he renovated the Warsaw Royal Castle and praised the Polish-Lithuanian Commonwealth and Polish kings. Marcin Zaremba remarks that "from the very start of the communist rule in Poland national history was never spoken of in this way". Historian Jan Kubik writes of Gierek period:

[Gierek] emphasized (...) the elements of the nation’s heritage that concurred with the vision of the Polish state as an ethnically and culturally homogeneous entity. (...) Thus, construction of the image of an ethnically homogeneous Poland was one of the priorities of the official propaganda and was guarded carefully by the censorship. One of the results of this policy was the almost total elimination of the Jews from official Polish history.

=== 1980s ===
Gierek's administration became embroiled in an economic crisis in late 1970s, as Western markets shrank after the 1973 Oil Crisis, which made Gierek's policy of liberalized trade backfire. After food prices rose rapidly, beginning in 1976, his rule was marked by demonstrations, strikes and riots. Unable to contain the growing dissent, Gierek was ousted by his party in 1980. A year before, on 1 January 1979, Piasecki died. After Gierek, Stanisław Kania became the general-secretary and focused exclusively on containing the growing Solidarity movement during his sixteen months of rule. Kania labelled the protesters "revisionist-Zionist, social-Democrat, right-clerical, cosmopolitan, and liberal-bourgeois" and "Jews from the margins". In October 1981, Kania was replaced by General Wojciech Jaruzelski, who imposed martial law in Poland in December 1981. While the imposition of martial law was generally bloodless, the Polish authorities took many thousands of activists were taken into custody and kept them in prison without trial for months.

Jaruzelski's rule became famous for embracing Endo-Communism – martial law was "justified almost exclusively through national and patriotic arguments", and the military council that Jaruzelski installed as the new governing body of communist Poland was called the Military Council of National Salvation (Polish: Wojskowa Rada Ocalenia Narodowego, WRON). Jaruzelski strongly "supported forces that remained nostalgic for the days of General Moczar and Endo-Communism". In 1982, Jaruzelski reorganized the communist-led ruling coalition into the Patriotic Movement for National Rebirth (PRON), and its chairman became Jan Dobraczyński, a long-time associate of Bolesław Piasecki, Catholic novelist and Endecja activist. Endecja was further embraced by the communist authorities in 1986, when Jaruzelski's Advisory Council came to include radical Endecja intellectuals such as Maciej Giertych. Rafał Pankowski stated that in the 1980s, Endo-Communists were "occupying seats in the government and parliament on a scale that surpassed the previous waves of such cooptation in Piasecki's lifetime".

Mikołaj Stanisław Kunicki notes that by the 1980s, Endo-Communist doctrine succeeded in "the nationalization of socialism", writing that "a nationalist-communist alliance preceded the official endorsement of nationalism and anti-Semitism by the communist leadership and paved the way for the recognition of a nationalist-communist kinship, which manifested itself in 1968 and came to full fruition under Wojciech Jaruzelski after 1981." Polish communists of the Patriotic Movement for National Rebirth "relied extensively on the rhetoric of nationalism, including old Piłsudskiite and Endek slogans". Kunicki argues that "Jaruzelski walked in Piasecki's footsteps", noting his patriotic and authoritarian-militarist, where to maintain the communist rule was regarded as a matter of "national interest" and "patriotic responsibility". Zaremba notes that in the 1980s, Polish communists even went as far as directly referencing Roman Dmowski, the founder of Endecja. In 1981 the Minister of Foreign Affairs, Stefan Olszowski, stated:

I would like to remind you that even if Roman Dmowski understood that Poland, as a nation and state, on this scale and with this power can exist and function only on the basis of relying on one of its neighbors . . . And let no one be deluded: it is true that if the Soviet Union will not guarantee our independent existence, our borders, then nobody will guarantee them. A few years will pass, maybe a dozen, and these lasting borders might no longer exist. These aren't empty threats, it is, unfortunately, the truth.

The communist party approved of the formation of the Patriotic Union Grunwald (Polish: Zjednoczenie Patriotyczne “Grunwald”, lit. 'Grunwald Patriotic Union') which came to be led by the director Bohdan Poręba. Numbering over 250,000 members by October 1981, it was described as a nationalist-communist formation that took a hardline approach towards reformism and anti-communist opposition and referenced nostalgia towards the 1944-1956 period. It exemplified the "Cement of the Party" (Polish: beton partyjny) - a hardline Stalinist faction within the Polish United Workers' Party. Its main programmatic line was resistance against "further decay of the state" and opposition "toward activities that threaten Polish national existence". The Grunwald Patriotic Union was named after the site of the Battle of Grunwald (a medieval conflict in which Poles defeated the Teutonic Knights in 1410) and served as a medium of nationalist, anti-German and antisemitic agitation; it demanded a plaque to "honor patriots and Communists who had fallen victim to the Zionist terror" and undermined the opposition by spreading rumours about the Jewish origins of Solidarity leaders. It was the main Endo-Communist organization in the 1980s apart from PRON, and was seen as the embodiment of "komunoendecja".

=== Post-communist relevance ===
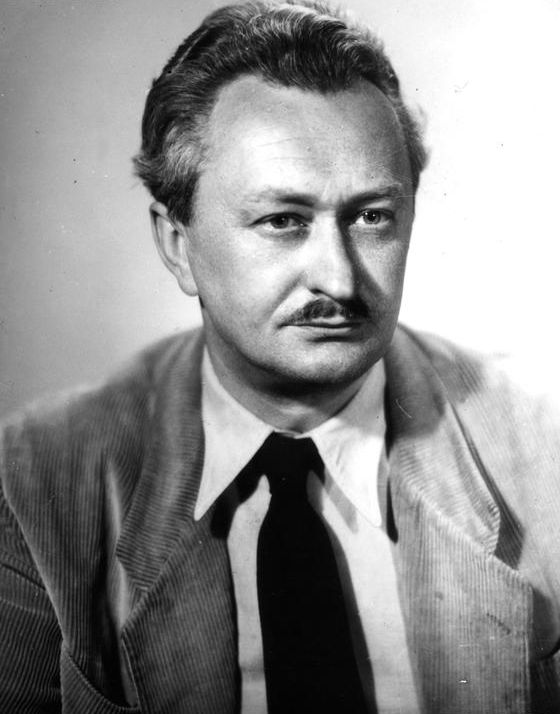
Jan Dobraczyński, an associate of Piasecki and Endecja activists who became the chairman of the Patriotic Movement for National Rebirth.

Shortly before 1989, Jaruzelski changed the course and instead pursued a strategy of reaching a "round table" agreement with Solidarity, mediated by the Catholic Church. This decision was strongly opposed by Grunwald, which took a hardline stance - Grunwald members were ones of the few delegates to vote against the Polish United Workers' Party self-dissolution at its last congress in January 1990. Rafał Pankowski argues that while Grunwald was unable to prevent the Polish Round Table Agreement and collapse of the communist regime, it was successful in terms of "educating a significant group of die-hard nationalist activists" who went on to found and participate in political parties of the 1990s and 2000s Poland, on both the far left and far right.

On the fall of the People's Republic of Poland, political scientist Gerald M. Easter wrote:

By the 1970s and 1980s, the PZPR itself had moved away from earlier forms of Leninism and Stalinism, toward national communism. That was the ideology overthrown in 1989. For anyone who embraced the broad framework of liberal democracy (stretching from social democrats through libertarians to Christian democrats), this was an unambiguous victory. But many in Poland did not want that sort of revolution back in the 1980s. Instead, they longed for a state that would repudiate the whole liberal vertex. They wanted a state that would preserve the PZPR's commitment to social cohesion, cultural homogeneity, and nationalism, but imbue it with a Catholic rather than a leftist vocabulary.

Pankowski writes that Endo-Communism "survived the communist period as a cultural tradition, reasserted its presence and was re-establishing itself firmly in the country's political culture". While it survived the collapse of the communist regime, Grunwald disintegrated in the early 1990s because of an internal conflict between its leaders, Poręba and Ciesiołkiewicz-Zalewski. Grunwald was formally dissolved in 1995, but its members went on to play significant roles in other parties. The leader of Grunwald, Bogdan Poręba, became a member of several radical nationalist groups, and then became famous for producing a 2005 patriotic drama sponsored by the far-left Self-Defence of the Republic of Poland (Samoobrona). Samoobrona, a far-left populist party that combined the traditions of the peasant movement, Catholic social teaching, nationalism, and ‘real socialism’ (Soviet-era socialism), was co-founded by the members of the nationalist wing of the Polish United Workers' Party. Numerous former Grunwald activists also joined Samoobrona, along with neo-endecja parties such as the National Party and the National Party "Fatherland" Eventually, many Grunwald activists became high-ranking members of the neo-endecja party League of Polish Families, which adopted some Endo-Communist elements such as far-left economic policies and taking a harshly critical stance of the anti-communist Solidarity and Workers' Defence Committee, denouncing them as "the representatives of Western agencies".

Jarosław Tomasiewicz wrote that after 1989, the nationalist camp in Poland was amorphous and included socialist overtones, adding that ironically, the post-1989 nationalist tradition in Poland is "not genetically linked to the traditions of the Polish national right", but rather with the national communist tradition of the Polish People's Republic. He noted that many parties, especially the League of Polish Families and the National Party, adopted "Grunwald lines" economically, while Self-Defence of the Republic of Poland adopted a kind of populism that "could be called ‘diluted national Bolshevism’, especially since many activists of this movement come from the Patriotic Union ‘Grunwald’."

After political parties with Endocommunist elements, such as the Party X, League of Polish Families, and Samoobrona, faded into irrelevance in 1990s and 2000s, the movement persisted through journalism, book publications, as well as YouTube, with former Patriotic Union ‘Grunwald’ members such as Kossecki and Bohdan Poręba, being featured in interviews and documentaries. Endocommunist activists have become a notable part of the Polish Independence Marches, often criticized for its inclusion of far-right and ultranationalist groups. According to Łukasz Drozda, post-1989 Endocommunists do not identify with any of the existing Polish major political movements, as they "chased Janusz Palikot out of Warsaw with equal energy, just as they booed Janusz Korwin-Mikke in Kraków." Modern Endocommunism is also associated with support for the Russian Federation in the Russo-Ukrainian War.

== Ideology ==
Michael C. Steinlauf defined endokomuna as a "peculiar marriage of authoritarian Communism and chauvinist nationalist tendencies", while Łukasz Drozda described it as a "dogmatic trend of Marxism–Leninism [that is] nationalist, sometimes even Endecja-like, in spirit". Richard S. Levy defined Endo-Communism as a form of national communism, "a mix of Endek (National Democrat) and Communist ideas". Jennifer Stark-Blumenthal described it as a "particular Polish path to socialism" that was "marked by ethno-nationalism, authoritarian and anti-elitist ideals, and tinged by antisemitism". Przemysław Gasztold-Seń wrote that Endo-Communists were "neither typical communists nor true nationalists, but combined elements of both attitudes", but that "its base formed not pre-war Endecja activists, but people close to the communist regime". Drozda described Endo-Communists as "Marxist–Leninist dogmatists sometimes associated with radical right-wing circles of a neo-Endecja orientation or Christian fundamentalism". Alina Cała wrote:

The transparent alliance of fascist Communists with Communist fascists, however, has its supporters even today. […] The distinctions between the two groups began to blur after the war as the Communists put into practice many of the tenets and policies of the pre-war National Democratic Party. Pro-Russian orientation, anti-German feeling, as well as the authorities' attitude towards the national minorities (forced polonization and the restrictions against their cultures) would have been acceptable to the most dyed-in-die-wool Endek.

Endocommunism is also seen as "a nationalist, xenophobic and anti-Semitic branch of Stalinism" inspired by both prewar Polish nationalism and Soviet actions such as the anti-cosmopolitan campaign. Włodzimierz Mokry saw it as Polish chauvinist and socially conservative communism. Tygodnik Solidarność described Endocommunism as "apologia for the Polish People's Republic, General Ivan Serov, the PAX Association, Moczarowite antisemitism, and pro-Russian policy". Endocommunism is considered to be synonymous to national communism; in a translation of Drozda's academic paper for Kultura Popularna, Central and Eastern European Online Library translated "komunoendek" as "national communist".

Within the context of the Polish People's Republic, Endocommunism was represented by "Gomułkites" and "Moczarites", the supporters of Władysław Gomułka and Mieczysław Moczar, respectively. The Natolinians, a 1950s faction opposed to De-Stalinization led by Moczar, was also considered a precursor of it. Endocommunist movements were considered to represent the political left, and terms such as "the party left", "patriotic left", or "national left" were used. Within the context of the Polish United Workers' Party, Endocommunism was regarded as the "conservative" or "dogmatist" wing. This was to differentiate it from the "liberals", which was the term used for reformists and supporters of compromise with the anti-communist opposition. Apart from the Grunwald Patriotic Union, "national left" label was also applied to the Creative Intelligentsia Club ‘Warsaw 80’ (Polish: Klub Inteligencji Twórczej „Warszawa 80”), the Katowice and Poznań Forums, the Szczecin Communist Movement (Polish: Ruch Szczecińskich Komunistów), and the ‘Reality’ Social and Political Knowledge Clubs (Polish: Kluby Wiedzy Społeczno-Politycznej „Rzeczywistość”). This label was inherited by post-1989 movements that had Endocommunist influences and members from this wing of the communist party, such as Samoobrona.

Marcin Zaremba, writing on the main representatives of Endo-Communism in communist Poland, the Partisans, wrote that their ideology was "a unique variety of nationalism expressed with the language of communist doctrine" and was characterized by "aversion toward everything in cultural and scholarly life recognized as non-Polish, affection for the military tradition, and, finally, a revulsion toward even a relative liberalization of political life in the country." Mikołaj Stanisław Kunicki considered Endo-Communist a Marxist–Leninist version of Piłsudski's colonels whose worldview "consisted of fanatical nationalism, anti-Semitism, authoritarianism, a military ethos, and overt opposition to liberalism of all kinds." Endo-Communists were also bound "by a strong sense of military camaraderie" and loyalty to the main leaders of the current, such as Mieczysław Moczar. Jarosław Tomasiewicz described Endo-Communism as an extreme form of national communism, while Jacek Kuroń wrote of the Partisants' Endo-Communism:

Firstly, it was nationalist, military, veteran-oriented and officially opposed to so-called national nihilism. Secondly, it was a somewhat plebeian egalitarian ideology that attacked various privileges – wealth, position, birth. It is in this context that I would place the cult of physical labour, discipline and order, as well as a certain moral puritanism, preached by its heralds.

Bartosz Korzeniewski described Endo-Communism as "military patriotism", stating that it was a combination of the official, state Marxist–Leninism with national ideology and military ethos, together with a strong anti-German and pro-Soviet attitudes. He wrote that this military patriotism served to "nationalise communist ideology", and that the state media actively participated in promoting this ideology, making it enter the national cinematography and popular culture. Kunicki notes that Moczar and his Partisans particularly cultivated this myth, writing that Moczar glorified the communist partisans and projected an image of patriotic “boys from the forest." This was also joined with the doctrine of PAX Association and Piasecki, who argued that "the whole history of People's Poland has demonstrated that the terms ‘people's’ and ‘national’ are fully compatible" and wrote that "patriotism was socialist and that socialism was patriotic". For Piasecki, anyone who opposed the incorporation of nationalism into communism was "guilty of antisocialist aberration".

=== Nationalism ===
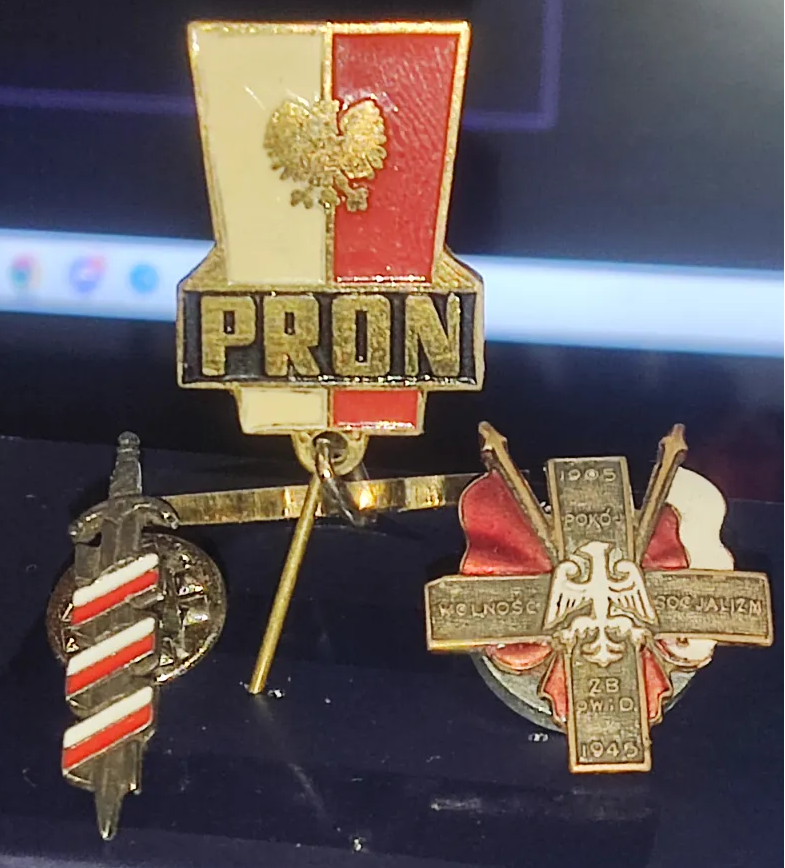
Pins of main movements related to endokomuna - Endecja, PRON, and ZBoWiD.

Endo-Communists actively promoted the concept of national communism. Considering the classic Marxist–Leninist doctrine too alien to the Polish society, Endo-Communists instead cultivated a "national-plebeian" tradition that portrayed Polish socialism as a continuity of pre-war and WW2-era Polish struggles for national liberation and a more egalitarian economic system. Given its extreme nationalism, endokomuna was also described as 'chauvinist', or ultranationalist. The main belief behind the nationalism of Endo-Communism was that communism needs to attain a "national coloring" by embracing nationalist and patriotic tradition because "the strivings of the Polish worker movement were animated by the same patriotism as the national-liberationist struggle", noting that both socialist revolutions and nationalist insurrections were marked by sacrifice, courage and a far-reaching collective goals. Nationalism was regarded as "mistress and teacher of life", and Endo-Communism was critical of socialist movements that either denied the power of nationalism, or sough to "disarm the nation morally" by encouraging cosmopolitanism; Western cultural influences, Zionism and liberalism were seen as particularly destructive to the "national organism" of People's Poland.

However, Endo-Communism did not reject internationalism, and instead embraced it. The Polish loyalty towards the Soviet Union was justified by arguing that the USSR is not just a Polish ally, but a part of the Polish nation and a collective Slavic nation. Moczar stated: "The Soviet Union is not only our ally, it is a saying for the nation. For us, partisans, the Soviet Union is our homeland, and I cannot define our borders today, today they are behind Berlin, and tomorrow in Gibraltar." The interest of Endo-Communism was also shown by its condemnation of Israel and strong support for Arab anti-imperalist movements, in particular Nasserism. At the same time, Endo-Communism is credited with "nationalizing" Polish communism, cultivating the myth of the insurrectionist tradition of Polish history. It harshly denounced those who questioned the meaningulness of Polish freedom uprising and insurrectionist uprisings, which partially motivated their anti-Zionism. Endo-Communists became popular by successfully presenting themselves as "indigenous" communists - other Polish communists were accused of being distant from the Polish proletariat and labelled “shinels” (“overcoats”), as they "came to Poland with the Red Army", while the Endo-Communists spent the World War II in anti-fascist guerillas and conspiracies.

A unique and controversial aspect of Endo-Communism was its rehabilitation of the Home Army, a Polish resistance group unaffiliated with the Soviet Union, of which many members would later form the "cursed soldiers" - anti-communist resistance. Endo-Communists argued that the role of anti-communist and non-communist partisans in fighting Nazi Germany has to be recognized and respected, while Moczar went as far as stating that non-communist Polish partisans were needlessly alienated and turned towards anti-communism because of misguided socialist practices. He pointed to the example of Antoni Heda (known as "Szary"), known for the Raid on Kielce Prison, speaking of him: "he held a good position against the Germans, and later, through our own fault, he would go breaking up [communist] prisons". Endo-Communists argued that "blood has one colour", and that anyone who fought for free Poland, regardless of his stance on communism, should be considered a hero and included in the new socialist Poland. Numerous actions were pursued by the "Partisans" to court non-communist war heroes, including providing them pensions, ensuring their release from prisons, and putting a halt on repression against them. This made Endo-Communism popular amongst non-communist nationalist circles.

In a 2014 interview with Myśl Polska, Józef Kossecki, a prominent member of the Grunwald Patriotic Union who was often identified as an Endocommunist, stated his belief on the socialist and post-socialist Poland:

The Polish People's Republic began its existence in a state of complete dependence on Moscow. However, at least since 1956, a process of gradual independence from Moscow began. The nationalist wing of the Polish United Workers' Party and the state apparatus played a decisive role in this process. Eventually, this process went so far that it was no longer profitable for Moscow to maintain the so-called socialist camp, and it proceeded to dismantle it.

Modern Poland has undergone exactly the opposite evolution. After the dissolution of Comecon and the Warsaw Pact, it began its existence as a completely sovereign state. However, already in the early 1990s, a process of gradual loss of this sovereignty began, so that today, in areas like the economy, it is far more dependent on foreign powers than the Polish People's Republic ever was, even during the Stalinist period. For example, even before 1956, Moscow did not interfere in matters such as the construction of a highway near a county town such as Augustów, whereas Brussels does interfere in such matters.

=== Anti-revisionism ===
Endo-Communists were highly critical of anti-Stalinist forms of communism and socialism, including Trotskyism, Khrushchevism and other socialist movements supportive of De-Stalinization. Endo-Communists argued that these movements are "isolated from the working class, as well as from the vast majority of the Polish nation, unable even to empathise with its needs". Such revisionist, anti-Stalinist or anti-nationalist movements were referred to by Endo-Communists as bananowcy ("bananists" or "banana left", implying privileged consumption of delicacies such as bananas), and denounced as being nothing but "a frustrated section of high school and university students from the elite circles". They stated that the "vast majority" of both banana left and anti-communist activists were "people from well-off intellectual, petty bourgeois or even capitalist families". These movements were accusated of "subjective and individualistic interpretations of the global revolutionary process", "reducing revolutionary struggle to a physical confrontation between the forces of social progress and the coercive apparatus of the bourgeois state" and derailing the Marxist–Leninist state in favour of "their own particular conception of the revolutionisation".

The Endo-Communist dogmatism towards Marxist–Leninism and legacy of Stalin was also justified from the nationalist perspective; Grunwald Patriotic Union argued that Stalinism is not a danger to the Polish nation, while Trotskyism "seeks to destroy all cultures based on faith in God" and that "the Trotskyists are primarily concerned with destroying everything that is Polish, historical, national, Christian, and even with our destruction, or at least our biological weakening, i.e. the extermination of the Polish people themselves." Drozda wrote that the main reason why the USSR was not alarmed by the ultranationalist rhetoric of Endocommunism was because of its extremely hostile attitude towards Trotskyism and all other forms of socialism that were critical of the Soviet Union or the Warsaw Pact. The 1981 martial law was fully supported by Endo-Communists, who justified it as a form of defense of Polish socialism and Polish nations against the "Trotskyists and Zionists" of Solidarność.

=== Social conservatism ===
Endo-Communism justified Marxism–Leninism in socially conservative terms, arguing that the Soviet domination protected Eastern Europe from the cultural revolutions and departure from traditional values and family values in the Western capitalist camp. Endo-Communists believed that "the Russian people are not our enemies, and Russian interests are not contrary to Polish interests", and noted that even non-communists should see that the Soviet Union, with its morally conservative values, is a better partner for Poland than the West, which would seek to erode Polish nationalism, Catholicism and moralism in favor of cosmopolitanism, atheism and hedonism. Moczar, the leader of the Partisans faction, mocked introduction of foreign culture onto Polish soil, calling the Westernophile youth "pathetic youthful parrots".

Given that the Endo-Communists controlled the security service of People's Poland, they played a decisive role in shaping the attitude of the state apparatus towards cultural issues. While People's Poland is credited with legalizing abortion and it never officially criminalised homosexuality, social conservatism prevailed. Officially, homosexuality was treated as a 'social pathology', and homosexual circles were invigilated and subjected to blackmail through Operation Hyacinth. There was no feminist wave in Poland, and until its very dissolution, the communist authorities treated youth movements with disdain and extreme suspicion, contrasting them with nationalist youth unions cultivated by circles such as Endo-Communism. The Partisans saw women as mothers first and foremost, stressing that motherhood is the social obligation of every woman, and that women need to be taken care of and rewarded by men for their sacrifices. Abortion was also opposed by Endo-Communists and cited as an example of Western moral degeneracy - Józef Kossecki, a member of the Grunwald Patriotic Union, wrote:

Currently, in major capitalist countries – primarily in the USA, Canada, England and Sweden – abortions are legally performed on a large scale, even in the seventh month of pregnancy. Advanced pregnancies are terminated by doctors there using caesarean sections, and the subsequent children, most of whom are alive and are in fact normal premature babies, are burned in crematoria or used in experiments during which they are killed. A highly profitable industry has developed in these countries around such practices.

Endo-Communism also utilized social conservatism and nationalism in order to criticize the West and the anti-communist opposition; Endo-Communists spoke of the "anti-national function of the political underground in Poland", and argued that should capitalism be restored in Poland, it will lead to liberal and anti-clerical reforms "all the way to the regression of national culture". A PZPR declaration from 1984 argued: "The realities of today's world as such that anti-communism excludes patriotism and the fight against socialism excludes slogans about the good of the nation. One cannot separate concepts of patriotism from class interests and one cannot speak of just any kind of Poland, because it is socialist." Endo-Communists argued that after decades of alliance with the USSR, it became clear that the Soviets did not seek to "destroy the biological fabric of the nation", while the Western-funded opposition did.

Przemysław Gasztold-Seń defined Endo-Communism as left-authoritarian, writing that it took socially conservative positions, and was of "conservative and puritan" regarding cultural issues. Initially fighting jazz and rock-and-roll, Endo-Communists later also clamped down on metal music as a part of its plan to suppress Western cultural elements, which they regarded as 'imperialist infiltration'. Grunwald Patriotic Union called for protection of Polish culture and patriotism from the "flood of Western nihilism developed out of the vulgarized existentialist philosophy of Jean-Paul Sartre." Endo-Communism stressed the needed to protect and develop "Marxist, Christian, and most importantly national values". Endo-Communists also founded youth and paramilitary organizations that would halt the "deideologization and demoralisation of the young generation of Poles", stating that Poles must be raised in nationalist values in order to become "immune from the cosmopolitan influences of Western ideology, culture, and consumptionist way of living".

In an interview with Polityka, Drozda described the social views of Endocommunists and the rhetoric they used:

Institutions such as PAX and the Grunwald Patriotic Union were established. This movement could be described as Endocommunism. The language of the extreme right was merged with the Marxist-Leninist doctrine. It could be said that the right-wing endecja tradition gave communist rhetoric a familiar character, with patriotic trappings emphasizing concepts such as land, blood, indigenousness, and hostility toward foreigners. The harsh, parochial morality of real socialism fit in perfectly with this.

For this nationalist and conservative party wing, the main enemy was not the Roman Catholic Church, but rather the “leftists,” i.e., the students who protested in 1968, followed by KOR and the secular left. The search for enemies, such as Jews or feminists, was as easy for a neo-endek as it was for the party hardliners to search for hostile Trotskyists. These circles were united by their aversion to pluralism, tolerance, and sexual freedom. KOR was condemned for its liberal tendencies, for its Zionism, and additionally for its links to Freemasonry.

=== International matters ===
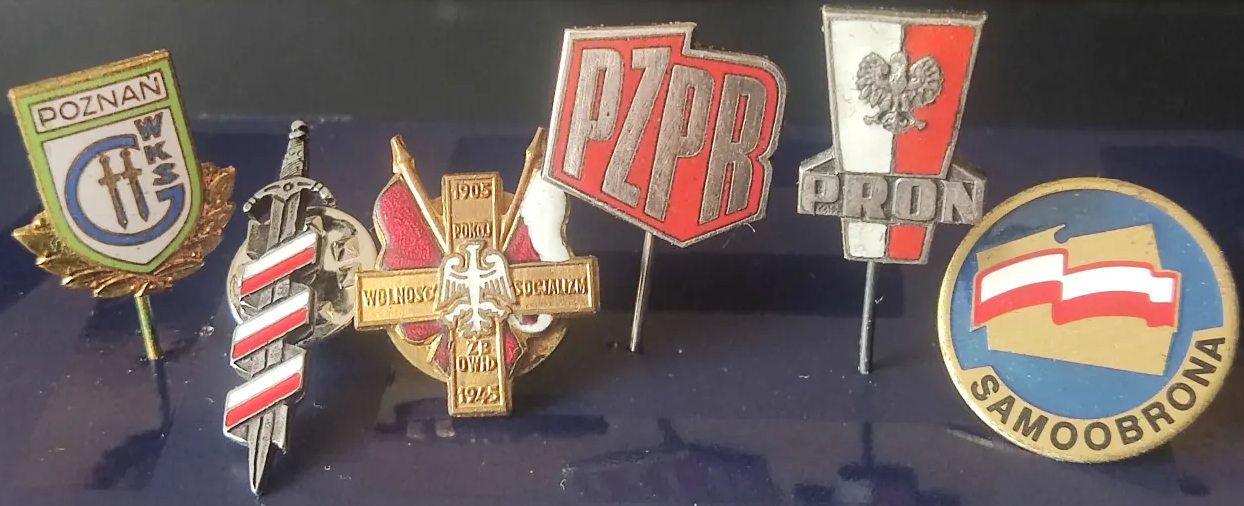
Pins of Polish organizations related with Endo-Communism - the Grunwald Patriotic Union, Endecja, ZBOWiD, PZPR, PRON and Samoobrona.

In regards to foreign policy, Endo-Communism called for acceptance of Soviet domination of Eastern Europe, which it found both necessary and the only guarantee of establish Polish independence and sovereignty in the long-term. Endo-Communists warned against the threat posed by capitalist West Germany and its "Nazi revanchists", and strongly emphasized the Polish People's Republic founding myth of Polish anti-Hitler resistance. They noted that it was only thanks to the Soviet Union and Polish resistance that Poland was liberated from Nazi occupation, while the West often took a passive stance towards Nazi Germany and ultimately betrayed Poland (Western Betrayal). The circles of Endo-Communism wrote a particularly scathing critique of Solidarity, stating: "Apparently Solidarity is blind to the victory at Stalingrad, which was a turning point in the war in favour of the anti-Hitler coalition. However, this is hardly surprising. You will not find a single word in their speeches and articles, including those published in the Western press, about the retaliatory forces in West Germany or about the danger posed by those groups that have not renounced the idea of Drang nach Osten. As the saying goes, ‘Show me your friends and I will tell you who you are’."

Endo-Communists emphasized "the unity of the Eastern Bloc in the face of the American-Germanic threat and drew generously from old Pan-Slavic myths, whether about Slavic cultural brotherhood or about the role of Russia". Historian Mikołaj Mirowski that an element of Endocommunism was a "pan-Slavic fascination with Russia in its Soviet form".

Another prominent foreign policy view of Endo-Communists was Anti-Zionism. Moczar frequently spoke of the suffering of the Arab population 'under the yoke of Israel' and described Israel as a country "on whose territory, even before last June, there existed ghettos for Arabs, ghettos organized by the same people who once worked as policemen in the Hitlerite ghettos of our cities." Government-affiliated media presented cases of Jewish cooperation with Nazi Germany during World War II, including Jewish police forces, the Judenräte and the Jewish informers of Gestapo. One of the most controversial claims was that Jews who had collaborated with the Nazis during the war were now responsible for the persecution of Arabs under Israel.

=== Economic issues ===
Endo-Communists rarely commented on economic matters, but nevertheless presented a unique vision on the direction of Polish socialism. Their economic proposals for reform were variously described as "primitive populist" and "anti-elitist", as well as "plebeian egalitarian". The main assumption of the economic proposals of Endo-Communism was to establish national communism through safeguarding Polish economic sovereignty, promoting economic patriotism, and adopting socialism to the national peculiarities and conditions of Poland. Endo-Communists also called for restoring the economic policies of Stalin, arguing that post-1956 reforms loosened necessary socioeconomic controls and thus gave rise to corruption, exploitation and black market. As part of national communism, Endo-Communists proposed replacing Jewish and foreign-born workers and functionaries with ethnic Poles, arguing that Polish socialism had hitherto unfairly favoured ethnic minorities and prevented social advance of the Polish workers; after the 1968 purges, vacant position were decentralized into lower-level positions, which helped "thousands of ethnic Poles rise in the bureaucracy". There was also a redistributive factor in regards to housing, as the luxurious apartments of officials purged by Endo-Communists were then distributed to Polish families, which in effect "allowed many families to improve their living situation".

Endo-Communists were critical of consumerism and policies that encouraged it. They also defended central planning of the economy and opposed policies that served to increase economic competition or introduce various elements of capitalism. Similarly, Endo-Communists denounced anti-inflation policies as well as the concept of workers' self-government, which they saw as corruptible and easily exploited by political opposition. Instead, they encouraged increasing the role of computers in the economy, especially in terms of optimizing state planning. Endo-Communism also opposed the reforms of Edward Gierek, arguing that the loans taken from the West would make Poland economically dependent on the West, eventually turning it into a semi-colony of USA and Western Europe in the process. Endo-Communists denounced what they called "parametric-market reformism", which they defined as increases of market dynamics and economic interactions with the capitalist West; in their view, these policies only served to enslave Poland and undermine Polish socialism. They also strongly opposed any presence of "non-Polish capital" in Poland, and opposed the presence of Polish companies abroad. According to Endo-Communists, establishing economic presence in other countries was "the gradual sell-off of our country" in that Polish companies benefited foreign capital rather than the Polish one, and undermined the need to establish economic self-reliance of Poland. Endo-Communists frequently warned that the West did not wish well to Poland, but instead had plans to turn it into a "neocolony". Given its emphasis on national conditions and the need for self-reliance, the economic proposals of Endo-Communism were compared to the 'national road to socialism' of Peronism as well as Juche.

=== Views on religion ===
One of the unique characteristics of Endo-Communism was its reconsideration of religion - Endo-Communists believed that both Marxism and Catholicism worked 'for the good of humanity', with Catholicism being a 'spiritual plane' for materialist Marxism. While recognizing nationalism as revolutionary, Endo-Communists connected Catholicism to it, recognizing the Catholic faith as the cornerstone of Polish national identity. Bolesław Piasecki, the leader of PAX, went as far as promoting a "Marxist-Catholic-nationalist trinity" - Polish communists were to legitimatize their rule and gain popular appeal by allowing Catholicism to "enrich Marxism spiritually", while embracing nationalism was to deny the opposition the claim to represent national interests of Poland. The Endo-Communist circles included the "priest-patriot" movement, composed of left-wing nationalist Catholic priests who were supportive of the communist regime.

The ideas of PAX Association gained respect of some Catholic theologians, most notably French personalist philosopher Emmanuel Mounier, who considered the movement "genuine Christian revolutionaries". Mounier argued that Polish Catholics should establish a modus vivendi with the Soviet Union, adopt socialism "which in its Polish version was not anticlerical" and reconcile Catholicism with Marxism. This stance was shared by the Endo-Communists, who believed that Catholics should prove to communists that they are not "defenders of the bourgeoisie". Some Catholic priests who were critical of the anti-communist opposition were allied with the Endo-Communist movement. Endo-Communists portrayed capitalism as a system that destroys Catholic values, and argued that the preservation of 'traditional values' is a "common duty of both communists as well as Catholics". They also praised sermons critical of the opposition, stating that Solidarity only wants to use the Church, speculating that it will sideline religion once coming to power.

Endo-Communists regarded Catholicism very positively, and argued that that the Church must not allow itself to be instrumentalized by the pro-Western opposition; they dismissed accusations of communist persecution of religion as often fabricated, arguing the West was the true enemy of Christianity given its anti-clericalism, secularism, and disregard for Christian morality. Abortion was frequently cited as an example of the Western disregard for Christianity. Endo-Communism also stressed that the logical conclusion of the Catholic social teaching is to "fight capitalism and install socialism compatible with the principles of Catholic morality", and that Catholics must struggle against a system that is "socialist in name only, in reality being devoid of any socialism in its content".

The main Endocommunist organisation, the Grunwald Patriotic Union, would agree with the Catholic Church that the younger generation of Poles should be educated "on the principle of the primacy of spirit over matter". It also supported Christian personalism, arguing that building Polish socialism derives from "the necessity of fully implementing the principles of personalism and social justice, which unite both Christians and Marxists". The organisation also argued that the fact both Endocommunists and the Catholic Church had been accused of antisemitism amongst oppositionist and Western circles is further proof of the socialist closeness to Catholic teaching.

=== Comparison with other states ===
Michael Shafir describes endokomuna as a form of national communism with "the assimilation of ideas with direct linkage to the prewar Endecja". He argues that endokomuna was a part of a wider trend towards national communism that started in the Soviet Union and then spread to the rest of the Warsaw Pact under Joseph Stalin. According to Shafir, there emerged national communist interpretations of Stalin's socialism in one country doctrine, and chauvinist tendencies were further inflamed by the "highly anti-Semitic campaign against cosmopolitanism in the late 1940s and early 1950s" in the Soviet Union; afterwards, in Soviet countries "nationalism took the form of National Bolshevism".

Shafir wrote that endokomuna was "hardly peculiar", as with the exception of Czechoslovak Socialist Republic, all Warsaw Pact countries embraced similar forms of national communism. He points to Nicolae Ceaușescu in Romania, whose communist ideology adapted "the world outlook of the interwar Fascist Iron Guard encoded in all but official acknowledgment in party documents", as well as Enver Hoxha in Albania and Todor Zhivkov's "xenophobic communism" in Bulgaria. Shafir concludes that "national communism, though it may seem to be a political oxymoron, became increasingly the norm by the 1970s and certainly by the 1980s as the Marxist–Leninist regimes sought to hold on to power in face of collapsing political legitimacy", and that a "large part of the post-Communist East Central European political spectrum is occupied by parties of 'radical continuity' and – to a lesser, but not inconsiderable – extent by parties of 'radical return' to the values embraced by the interwar radical right".

Jozef Banáš makes a similar argument, writing that while Polish Endo-Communism developed unique characteristics on its own, it was a part of the larger trend in Warsaw Pact where communism had gradually become "brown" and transitioned into national communism. He also stated his belief that Endo-Communism represented a Polish form of Stalinism:

Polish Endo-Communism was not unique. Although it has developed distinctive traits of its own, it can claim among its antecedents the curious blend of fossilized orthodox Marxism, of oriental despotism, and of Great-Russian chauvinism and expansionism, which went under the name of Stalinism. […] Jew-baiting applied in moderation had already proved its usefulness during the interfactional struggles in the Soviet Communist Party during the 1920s and 1930s, especially as a corollary to Stalin’s Great Purges, and then again in the fight against ‘rootless cosmopolitans without a fatherland’ in the late 1940s. On the other hand, the planned mass resettlement of Soviet Jewry, epitomized in the case of the ‘Kremlin doctors’ (‘murderers in white gowns’) […] was to show that this had not been a passing aberration or perversion, but part and parcel of the system.

The transformation of communism into national communism has effectively taken place everywhere, in all countries where communists have seized power and probably in most parties still fighting for power. The new ideology has served different, sometimes even antagonistic, objectives: in the Soviet Union it provides a rationale for Great Russian chauvinism, for the oppression of other nationalities, and for world expansion. Among other peoples of the USSR, and in particular in the so-called satellite countries, it made resistance to enforced Russification easier, and even contributed to maintaining the vestiges of sovereignty (e.g. Yugoslavia or Rumania, and of course China); in those cases it has something to recommend it, even though it does not always contribute to relaxation of internal oppression. But elsewhere the incongruous marriage of Communism and chauvinism has only disguised total subservience to Moscow; such is the case in what we have called Endo-Communism in Poland, though parallels can be found in other countries too, such as Czechoslovakia and East Germany.

== Chamokomuna ==
Chamo-communism Chamokomuna
- Main people: Mieczysław Moczar; Władysław Gomułka; Bogdan Poręba
- Ideology: National Bolshevism; Polish nationalism Ethnonationalism
- Political position: Far-left
- Representatives: Natolinians; Partisans; Patriotic Union Grunwald; Rodacy Kamraci; Myśl Polska

A term parallel to endokomuna is chamokomuna, or chamokomunizm, translated as "boorish communism". Instead of Endecja, the first part of portmanteau comes from cham, in the meaning of "boor". Polish-Jewish sociologist Witold Jedlicki is considered to have coined this term, introducing it in his 1962 essay Boors and Jews (Polish: Chamy i żydy) to depict a faction of Polish communists that he associated with anti-intellectualism and boorishness in the sense of low-class mentality, unreflective conservatism and nationalism, as well as anti-Semitism. Jedlicki identified the Natolinians as chamokomuna, or the "Boors", while the Puławians were seen as żydokomuna — the Jews. The former were seen "as honest people, albeit agents of Moscow", while the latter were "striving to secure influential positions for years" and "embarked on a decisive struggle against Gomułka".

Chamokomuna was described as synonymous with Endocommunism, and Mieczysław Moczar; Moczar's faction, the Partisans, are also considered to represent chamokomuna. Chamocommunism was therefore also described as "Moczarism". In a translation of his work, Wojciech Muszyński described Chamocommunism as "Moczarite" and translated it as "boorish communists". However, he also argued that Chamocommunism should be separated from Bolesław Piasecki, who is regarded as the main representative of Endocommunism. In contrast, Piasecki-aligned journal Myśl Polska is called both Endocommunist and Chamocommunist.

Furthermore, Chamocommunism was identified with the Patriotic Union Grunwald, including the so-called "ex-grunwald" groups that continued activity in modern Poland. Within modern context, Chamocommunism is seen as a part of the Polish nationalist movement, and its followers are seen as "neo-Moczarists", or alternatively as "post-Moczarists". Bogdan Poręba, former member of the Grunwald Patriotic Union that became a prominent national communist and film director after 1989, is considered an "ardent Chamocommunist". He strongly opposed the dissolution of the PZPR in 1990.

Chamokomuna also has a class character in its meaning, as it referred to the social origins of its members and followers. Right-wing Polish journalist Leszek Żebrowski states that Chamocommunists were often poor, uneducated, came from the social fringes, and were considered the lumpenproletariat. This was contrasted with żydokomuna, associated with Jews, who in turn were seen as an affluent group in Poland. This also gave chamokomuna an ethnonationalist component, as its poor members were seen as connected to the Polish people; Żebrowski argues that prior to 1956, 40% of Security Office management staff were of Jewish descent and were not connected to Poland as they "did not fully feel that they were co-stewards sharing responsibility for the country". This was also emphasized by Marek Jan Chodakiewicz, who notes that Chamocommunists came from the lower strata of society, and while initially their identity was limited to their local communities, the German occupation of WW2 had radicalized them into a strong expression of Polish identity.

=== Faction ===
Although primarily linked to Natolinians, Chamocommunism was also described as "Gomułkist" and connected to Władysław Gomułka. From the perspective of 1956, the "żydokomuna" was identified with former loyalists of Bolesław Bierut, while chamokomuna was identified with Gomułka. Thus, Chamocommunism is considered to have won the power struggle against the former in the party. Chamocommunists were considered to have advocated for, and carried out, Polish intervention in the 1968 invasion of Czechoslovakia, as well as the 1968 Polish political crisis, during which purges and arrests against Polish Jews were carried out. According to journalist and Soldarność activist Jan Martini, Chamocommunists prevailed over the Puławians and their actions led to "the emigration of several thousand people of Jewish descent". The 1968 crisis is considered the event which ultimately concluded the conflict between "żydokomuna" and "chamokomuna" in favor of the latter.

According to Chodakiewicz, Chamocommunism was supported by the KGB, specifically by Alexander Shelepin, Vladimir Semichastny, and Yuri Andropov. The KGB trusted Mieczysław Moczar in particular, given his Orthodox Christian background as well as his long history of collaboration with the Soviets - he was a member of the interwar Communist Party of Poland, then after its dissolution was an agent of the Soviet GRU, and during WW2 he joined the Polish Workers' Party, People's Guard, and then worked in the Security Service after WW2. Moczar declared his loyalty to the Soviet Union, stating in 1948: "The Soviet Union is not just our ally; that is a saying for the people. For us, for party members, the Soviet Union is our homeland, and I am unable to define our borders today — today they are beyond Berlin, and tomorrow they will be at Gibraltar."

In 2016, Polish conservative weekly newspaper Do Rzeczy published an article by Piotr Zychowicz titled "Żydokomuna or chamokomuna?" In the article, Zychowicz identified żydokomuna with Jews and international communism, while chamokomuna was seen as a representative of national communism, being in an open struggle against the former. Zychowicz goes on to suggest that this struggle continues to take place in modern Poland, considering the right-wing populist party Law and Justice to correspond to the role of chamokomuna. The article was criticized for "legitimatizing open anti-Semitism" and repeating the stereotype of Judeo-Bolshevism.

=== Ideology ===
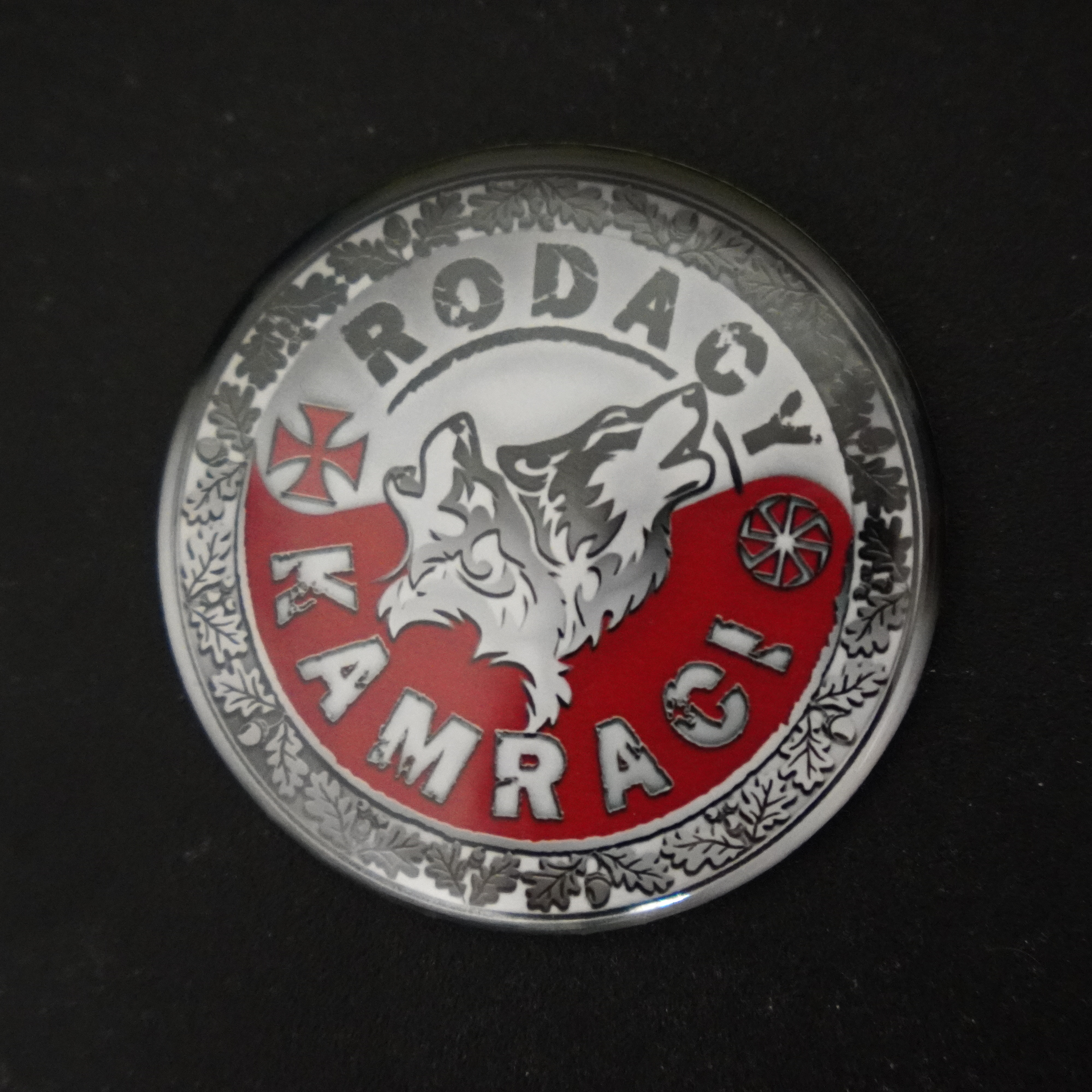
Pin of Rodacy Kamraci, a modern movement that has been described as a representative of chamokomuna.

Chamocommunism has been described as a faction of the far-left. Polish-American historian Marek Jan Chodakiewicz connected chamokomuna to National Bolshevism, arguing that Władysław Gomułka represented it. Gomułka was also considered an Endocommunist by scholars such as Jozef Banáš. Chodakiewicz argues Chamocommunism utilized nationalism in order to legitimatize communist rule in Poland, and promoted patriotism specifically towards socialist Poland. He contrasted Chamocommunism with żydokomuna, arguing that unlike the latter, Chamocommunism had a nationalist character:

Even though this “chamokomuna” originated and operated outside the borders of the Soviet Union, it continued to operate in the name of communism within a native context of the local majority: Polish, Latvian, Spanish, Italian, or American. Moscow remained the “home” and the main point of reference, but the assimilationist context of “chamokomuna” was its own, “national,” rather than foreign.

Chodakiewicz described Chamocommunists as neo-Moczarists, arguing that they "rely on reflexes, habits, and clichés from 50 years of Soviet occupation", and dating their origins back to the embrace of Polish patriotism by Polish communists in 1956. He states that this movement "had immersed itself in the classics of conservatism, monarchism, and nationalism", and draws heavily from the legacy of Western right-wing philosophers of the 19th and 20th centuries. According to Chodakiewicz, Chamocommunists "camouflage the main messages of national Bolshevism within pseudo-conservative phrases and clichés".

Chamocommunism is also considered ethnonationalist, and in contrast to Endo-Communism, it is associated with anti-clericalism. It seeks to limit Christian influence on Polish nationalism and promotes forms of neo-paganism. Chamokomuna is considered to have waged a campaign against the Catholic Church, and the communist celebrations of the Millennium of the Polish State are seen as an attempt to pit the Church's commemoration of Mieszko I's baptism against the nationalist anniversary of the foundation of Polish state. Conversely, modern movements that are considered Chamocommunists are neo-pagan.

It has also been associated with antisemitism, loyalty to the Soviet Union, and Stalinism. The victory of Chamocommunists in the PZPR power struggle had resulted in antisemitic persecution, including purges and arrests, that led to an emigration of several thousand Jews from Poland. Chamocommunists also supported the Soviet invasion of Czechoslovakia in 1968. The loyalty to the Soviet Union was also a trait of Chamocommunists such as Moczar. Polish sociologist Paweł Śpiewak stated that the dominance of Chamocommunists was the "heyday of the [neo-]Stalinism", and noted their policy of forced emigration towards Polish Jews.

==== Modern movement ====
Main beliefs of modern Chamocommunism include the idea that Wojciech Jaruzelski saved Poland, demonizing the anti-communist insurgents (żołnierze wyklęci) and their legacy, postulating an alliance with Russia, and supporting the Russian President Vladimir Putin. Chodakiewicz described it as "pseudo-conservatism", stating that modern representatives of Chamocommunism are active in right-wing spaces and spread communist sympathies amongst the conservative and nationalist movement. Tomasz Sommer argued that Chamocommunism "is still communism", and listed anti-Ukrainian and pro-Russian positions amongst its core elements.

Wojciech Olszański and his movement, Rodacy Kamraci, are seen as an example of modern Chamocommunism. They declared their admiration for the Polish People's Republic, Ivan Serov, Władysław Gomułka, Joseph Stalin, Wojciech Jaruzelski, Bolesław Piasecki, as well as the leader of North Korea Kim Jong Un. They also expressed their support for Belarus, Russian Federation, abortion, and communist agrarian reform. The movement has made anti-Catholic declarations, with Olszański stating that he "shits on the Bible". Because of this, Rodacy Kamraci are identified with Chamocommunism, and described as "a splinter group of the far-left".

== See also ==
- National communism
- Left-wing nationalism
- Socialist patriotism
- National Bolshevism
- Ba'athism
- Juche
- Strasserism
- Żydokomuna
