= Fessard =

Fessard is a surname. Notable people with the surname include:

- Denise Albe-Fessard (1916–2003), French neuroscientist
- Étienne Fessard (1714–1774), French engraver
- Gaston Fessard (1897–1978), French Jesuit theologian
- Jean-Marc Fessard (born 1969), French classical clarinetist
