= Druzhne =

Druzhne (Ukrainian: Дружне) may refer to several places in Ukraine:

- Druzhne, Crimea
- Druzhne, Volnovakha Raion, Donetsk Oblast
- Druzhne, Yenakiieve, Donetsk Oblast
- Druzhne, Kherson Oblast
- Druzhne, Khmelnytskyi Oblast
- Druzhne, Luhansk Oblast
- Druzhne, Rivne Oblast
- Druzhne, Sumy Oblast
- Druzhne, Vinnytsia Oblast
- Druzhne, Kamianka settlement hromada, Polohy Raion, Zaporizhzhia Oblast
- Druzhne, Orikhiv urban hromada, Polohy Raion, Zaporizhzhia Oblast
- Druzhne, Zhytomyr Oblast
