= 1985 Polish parliamentary election =

- 13 October 1985

All 460 seats in the Sejm 231 seats needed for a majority
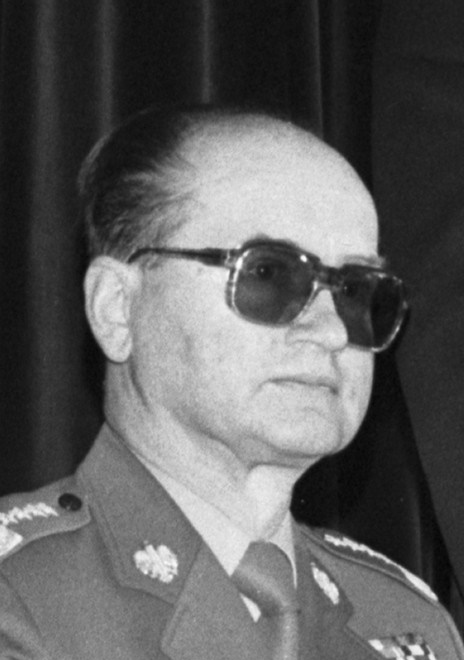

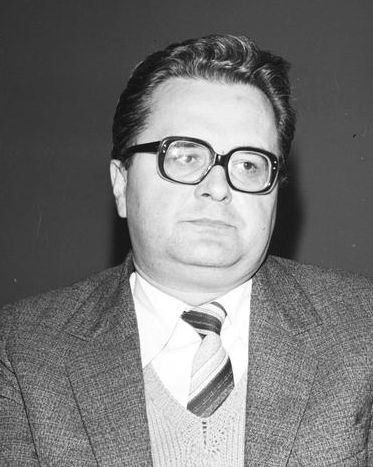

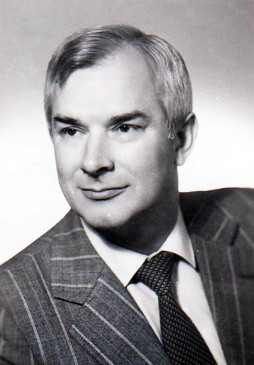
| | Majority party | Minority party | Third party |
|---|---|---|---|
| Leader | Wojciech Jaruzelski | Roman Malinowski | Tadeusz Witold Młyńczak |
| Party | PZPR | ZSL | SD |
| Alliance | PRON | PRON | PRON |
| Last election | 261 | 113 | 37 |
| Seats won | 245 | 106 | 35 |
| Seat change | ▼16 | ▼7 | ▼2 |

Parliamentary elections were held in Poland on 13 October 1985. According to the Constitution of 1952 the elections should have been held every 4 years, that is in the spring of 1984, but since the internal political situation was still considered "unstable" even after the repealing in 1983 of the Martial Law, the Sejm voted to extend its own term at first indefinitely (on February 13, 1984) and then until August 31, 1985 (on December 3, 1984), fixing the elections to be held not beyond the end of 1985. As was the case in previous elections, only candidates approved by the Communist regime (coalesced under the Patriotic Movement for National Rebirth, replacing the similar Front of National Unity) were permitted on the ballot. The outcome was thus not in doubt, nevertheless the regime was hoping for a high turnout, which it could then claim as evidence of strong support for the government among the population. The opposition from the Solidarity movement called for a boycott of the elections. According to official figures 78.9% of the electorate turned out to vote. This turnout, while relatively high, was much lower than the nearly 100% turnout which was reported in previous elections.

It was the last election in Communist Poland in which no real opposition candidates were allowed to participate. The following election in 1989, in which opposition parties could put up candidates for a portion of the seats, resulted in a convincing opposition victory followed by the downfall of the Communist system.

== TV Solidarity incident ==
In 1985, four college students at University of Toruń used a computer to hijack the signal of multiple state-owned television stations. They placed propagandist messages on the screen in an attempt to get the viewer to boycott the elections.

Enough price increases, lies, and repressions. Solidarity Toruń. It is our duty to boycott the election.

— "Telewizja Solidarność" (TV Solidarity)

== Results ==
The results, like with the other elections in communist Poland, were controlled by the communist government. The results of the 1985 election were duplicating, exactly, the results of the 1965 to 1972 elections, which were only marginally different from those of the preceding years.

| Party or alliance | | Votes | % | Seats | +/– |
|---|---|---|---|---|---|
| Patriotic Movement for National Rebirth | Polish United Workers' Party | 20,489,086 | 100.00 | 245 | –16 |
| Patriotic Movement for National Rebirth | United People's Party | 20,489,086 | 100.00 | 106 | –7 |
| Patriotic Movement for National Rebirth | Democratic Party | 20,489,086 | 100.00 | 35 | –2 |
| Patriotic Movement for National Rebirth | Independents | 20,489,086 | 100.00 | 74 | +25 |
| Total | | 20,489,086 | 100.00 | 460 | 0 |
| Valid votes | | 20,489,086 | 99.68 | | |
| Invalid votes | | 65,096 | 0.32 | | |
| Total votes | | 20,554,182 | 100.00 | | |
| Registered voters/turnout | | 26,065,497 | 78.86 | | |
Source: Nohlen & Stöver

As the other parties and "independents" were subordinate to PZPR, its control of the Sejm was total.

== Post-elections ==
Shortly after the elections, Jaruzelski resigned as prime minister and defence minister and became the Chairman of the Polish Council of State — a post equivalent to that of head of state of Poland. However, his power centered on and firmly entrenched in his coterie of "LWP" generals and lower ranks officers of the Polish People's Army.
