= Sprawy Narodu =

Sprawy Narodu was a Polish monthly magazine, dealing with the socio-cultural topics published in the occupied Warsaw from July 1943 to July 1944. It was printed secretly by the National Party (Stronnictwo Narodowe). Eleven issues were published. The editor was Jan Dobraczyński.
