= Piotr Moss =

Polish composer (born 1949)

Piotr Moss (born 13 May 1949 in Bydgoszcz) is a Polish composer of contemporary classical music.

Since 1981, he has lived in Paris and since 1984 has been a French citizen.

Moss studied in Poland with Piotr Perkowski, Grażyna Bacewicz, Krzysztof Penderecki and, from the late 1970s onwards, in Paris with Nadia Boulanger.

His important work as a composer is characterized by a permanent search for new sounds and new eclectic stylistic associations in a genre related to Alfred Schnittke's style of music.

In 2011, his concerto for clarinet d' un silence... was recorded by Jean-Marc Fessard.

See the Polish article to have a complete list of Moss' compositions.

== Awards and recognition ==
Piotr Moss received a number of main awards an various musical competitions in Poland, France, and elsewhere.

He is also a recipient of the following major awards and decorations:

- 2000: Knight of the Ordre des Arts et des Lettres (Order of Arts and Letters), France
- 2009 Decoration of Honor Meritorious for Polish Culture.
- 2009: Special award from the Ministry of Culture and National Heritage (Poland) on the occasion of the 60th anniversary and 40 years of musical work
- 2016: Officer of the Ordre des Arts et des Lettres (Order of Arts and Letters), France
