= Jean-Marc Fessard =

French classical clarinetist (born 1969)

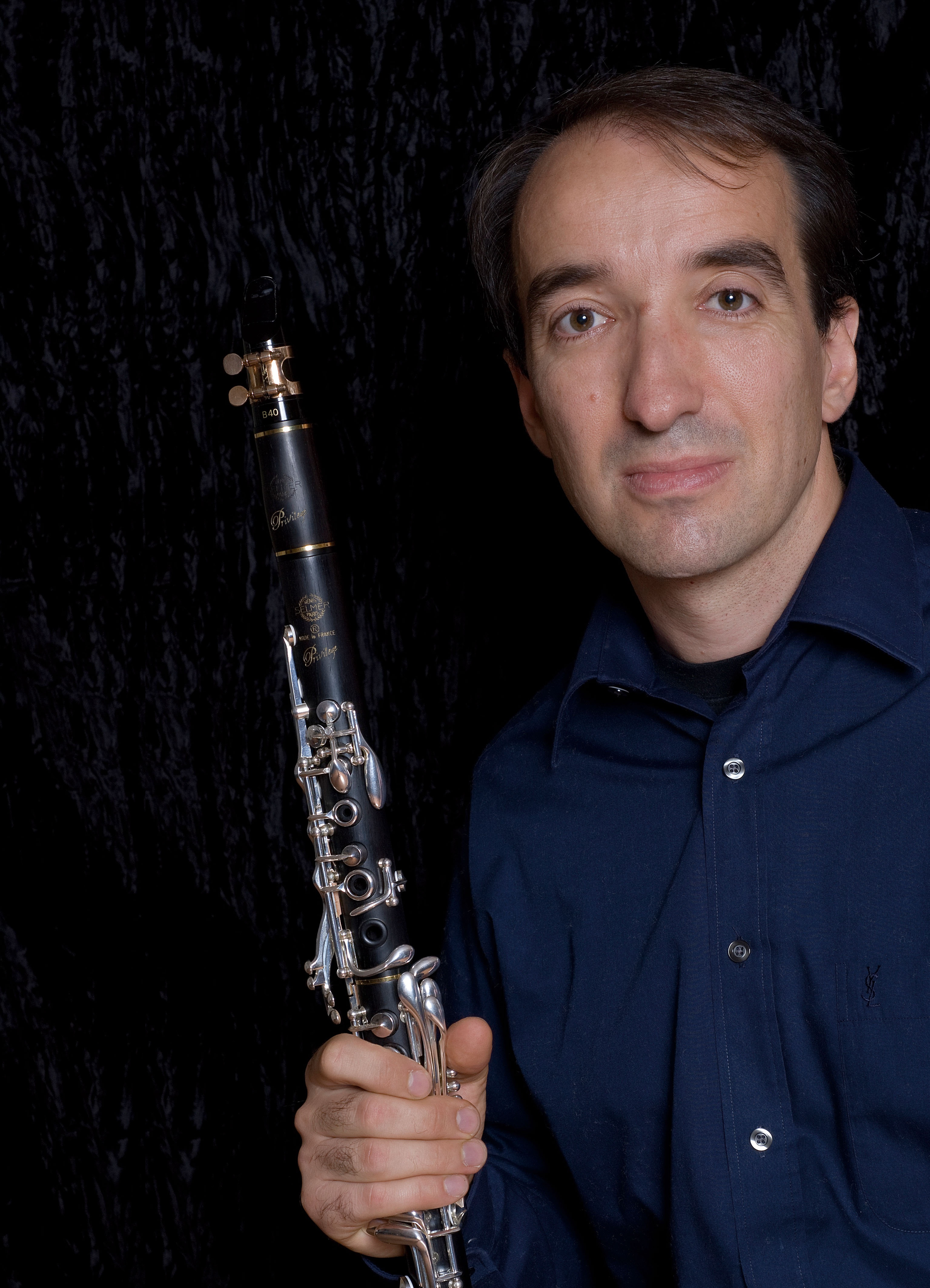
Jean-Marc Fessard

Jean-Marc Fessard (born 31 October 1969) is a French classical clarinetist.

== Life ==
Born in Étampes, Fessard studied at the Conservatoire de Paris (1st prize for clarinet, bass clarinet, and chamber music) at the Paris 8 University (master of musicology) and at the Higher Academy of Music in Gdańsk in Poland where he received the title of Doctor of Arts (PhD). He is the winner of the Paris International Competitions (3rd prize 1996), Illzach (1st prize 1997), Gdańsk (1st prize and Special Brahms-Preis 1997). Fessard received 1st prize in the Interpretation Competition Jacques Lancelot (1990). He has recorded about thirty CDs for labels such as Dux, Naxos, Signature Radio France, Triton, Kalidisc, Accord Universal, Clarinet Classics...Yvonne Loriod- (Dux 0459).

Fessard is particularly interested in the rare clarinet repertoire, notably recording Alexandre Tansman's clarinet music (concerto, concertino, chamber music with string quartets), Charles Koechlin's sonatas, Jacques Castérède, Jacques Bondon's and Henri Tomasi's concerti and Piotr Perkowski's pieces for clarinet and piano, Antoni Szałowski, Piotr Moss and Karol Rathaus. In 2011 he gave the Warsaw Radio Tansman's Concerto with the Silesian Chamber Orchestra and recorded Piotr Moss's clarinet concerto D'un silence..., a huge musical fresco of forty minutes in one movement, with the Polish National Radio Symphony Orchestra. In 2008, he collaborated with Krzysztof Penderecki for the premiere of his Sinfonietta for clarinet and string orchestra during the Yerevan festival in Armenia. He has dedicated and created numerous contemporary pieces for clarinet and bass clarinet such as the Bruno Letort's Clarinet Concerto, Shkodra inspired by the character of La frontière invisible by François Schuiten and Benoît Peeters and premiered at the Szczecin Philharmonic (Poland) and Michel Lysight's concerto for bass clarinet premiered with the Orchestre Royal de Chambre de Wallonie.

He has performed with the Polish National Radio Orchestra, the Poznań Philharmonic Orchestra, the Gdańsk Philharmonic Orchestra, the Katowice Philharmonic Orchestra, the Azerbaijan National Orchestra, the Szczecin Philharmonic Orchestra, the Czech Philharmonic Chamber Orchestra, l'Orchestre de chambre wallon, the Zagreb Chamber Orchestra, the Camerata Wrocław, the Élysée Quartet, the Ébène Quartet and the Wieniawski Quartet. He is a member of the Ensemble Sillages with whom he recorded a monograph dedicated to Allain Gaussin which received the Grand Prix of the Académie Charles-Cros in 2014 (Ameson) .

Fessard is invited for master classes by the Higher Academies of Prague, Poznań, Gdańsk, Katowice, Baku, the Royal College of Music in London, the University, the Chinese Central Conservatory of Music (Beijing) and the Orchestre Royal de Chambre de Wallonie. Fessard is also regularly invited as a member of the jury of the Alexandre Tansman International Competition in Lódz, the Johannes Brahms International Competition in Gdańsk, the Lódz Chamber Music Competition, the Kurpiński Competition in Włoszakowice and the Conservatoire de Paris Competitions. He is the author of L'évolution de la clarinette and a clarinet method Écoute, je joue!, published by Gérard Billaudot in Paris, a publisher for which he is collection director.

== Discography ==
- French Recital for clarinet and harp Gabriel Pierné, Jean-Baptiste Bedart, Laurent Coulomb, Serge Lancen, Paul Véronge de la Nux avec Rachel Talitman (Harp & Co)
- Beryllium de Michel Lysight, Yuhmi Iwamoto, soprano, Alain Van Kerckhoven, poèmes, Lionel Bams, piano, Marc Grauwels, flûte, Jean-Frédéric Molard, Red Jjeci, violons, Kela Canka, alto, Hans Vandaele, violoncelle (DUX)
- Effleurer le silence d'Anthony Girard avec Geneviève Girard, piano et Patrice Kirchhoff, flûte (CIAR Classics) "5 Diapasons"
- Camille Saint-Saëns:Sonates Françaises pour clarinette et piano, Jacques Castérède, Charles Koechlin, Francis Poulenc with Jadwiga Lewczuk, piano (Dux)
- Jacques Bondon and Henri Tomasi; Concertos pour clarinette et orchestre with the Philharmonic Orchestra of Poznań conducted by Jose Maria Florencio Jr (Dux)
- Olivier Messiaen's Quatuor pour la fin du temps with the Polskie trio (Dux) "Sélection Arte"
- Piotr Moss: D'un silence... Concerto for clarinet and orchestra with the Polish National Radio Orchestra conducted by Michał Klauza (Dux)
- Mikołaj Górecki: "Concerto for 2 clarinets" with the Polish Chamber Orchestra (Dux)
- Michel Lysight: Enigma with Ronald Van Spaendonck, clarinet, Éliane Reyes, piano (Dux )
- Ivan Bellocq's Obsession, Pierre Olivier Queyras, violin, Jean-Claude Henriot, piano (Dux)
- Artefact by Olivier Pénard with Marc Vieillefon, violin, Jonas Vitaud, piano, and Fabrice Bihan, cello (Dux)
- Allain Gaussin; Satori, Jardin Zen, Harmonie des sphères, Ensemble Sillages (Ameson) Grand Prix Charles Cros 2014
- Polish Music for clarinet and piano, Antoni Szałowski, Piotr Perkowski, Piotr Moss, Krzysztof Penderecki, Karol Rathaus, Witold Lutosławski, with Jadwiga Lewczuk, piano (Clarinet Classics London)
- French clarinet exports, works for 2 clarinets by Guillaume Connesson, Thierry Escaich, Ivan Bellocq, Jean-Marc Jouve, Christine Mennesson, Lucien Guérinel, Philippe Hersant, Bernard Cavanna, with Béatrice Berne, clarinets (Clarinet Classics London)
- In the light of Ravel, Ravel's Introduction and Allegro, Metcalf, Lysight, Groslot, Natra (Harp and Co)
- Ballades by Dominique Probst (Continuo classic)
- Départs by Piotr Moss (Signature Radio-France)
- Dédicaces for bass clarinet (Quantum classic)
- Alexandre Tansman: Concerto for clarinet and concertino for clarinet, oboe and orchestra, Silesian Chamber Orchestra, Jacek Błaszczek (Naxos)
- Alexandre Tansman: Chamber music with string quartet, Élysée Quartet (Naxos)
- Darius Milhaud's Suite en trio, Sonatine et Scaramouche, Éliane Reyes, piano, Frédéric Pelassy, violin (Naxos)
- Chamber music by Anthony Girard, Geneviève Girard, piano, Fabrice Bihan, cello (Naxos)
- Jean-Marie Simonis: works for clarinet or bass clarinet and piano (Kalidisc)
- Characters by Stéphane Joly (Kosinus Arts)
- Musique à 1, 2 ou 3 by Philippe Hersant (Triton) Music of the film Les Mains en l'air by Romain Goupil
- 12 Fantaisies for clarinet solo by Telemann, (Delatour-France)
- Thierry Escaich: American Trio with Arnaud Thorette, viola, and Johan Farjot, piano (Universal Accord)
- Philippe Hersant'sTo Be and to Have (music to the award-winning film at the Festival de Cannes) (Fred Leibovitz 2004)
- Dialogue de bêtes after Colette (Novaprod 2005)
- Mozart in new clothes by Fred Lagnau (BBC / Radio-France)
- Ouragan with the Edison Quartet (Corelia)
- Paul Cézanne, music by Louis Dandrel (Réunion des musées nationaux) Best CD Rom Recording Award 1995

== Publications ==
- L'évolution de la clarinette: Gérard Billaudot publisher, Paris (2014)
- Écoute, je joue!: Méthod of clarinet (3 volumes) in collaboration with Chantal Boulay and Cyrille, Gérard Billaudot publisher Paris (2015)
