= Patriotic Union "Grunwald" =

National communist association established in 1981

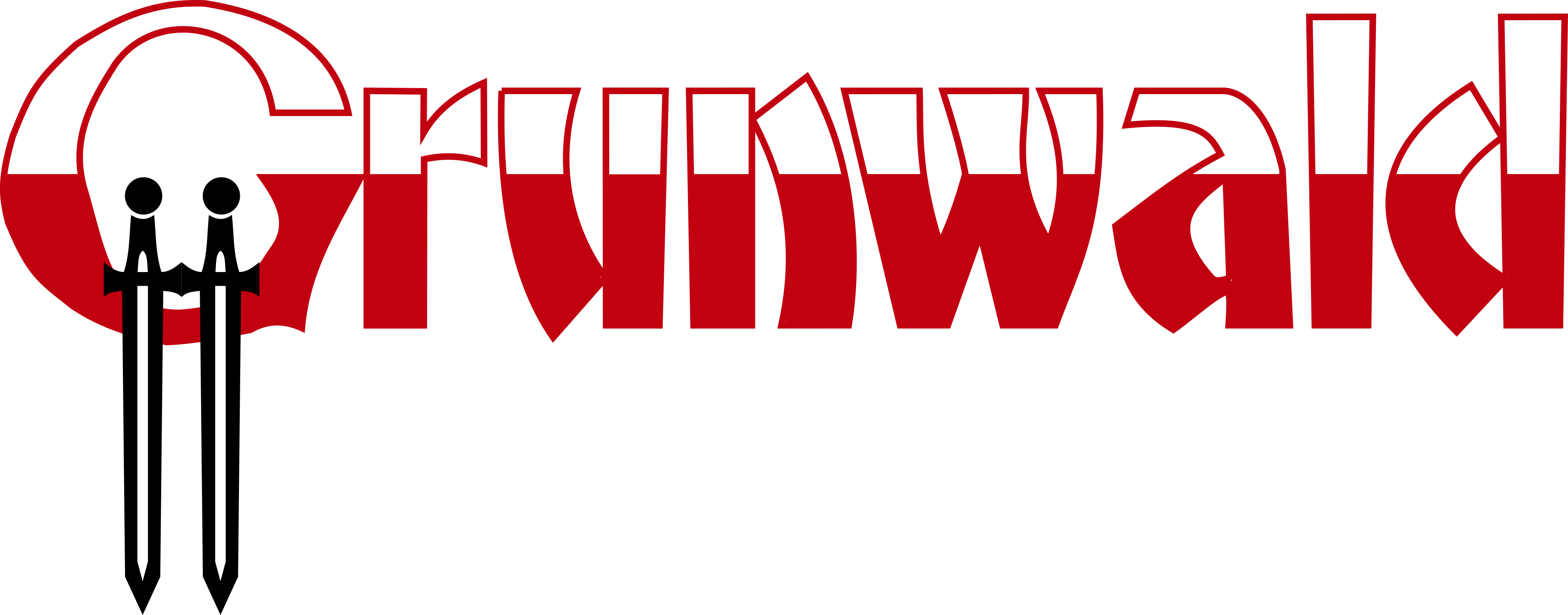
Logo of the Grunwald Patriotic Union

Patriotic Union "Grundwald" (Polish: Zjednoczenie Patriotyczne "Grunwald") was a national communist and endocommunist association founded on 25 April 1981. Its activists included Franciszek Cymbarewicz, Józef Kossecki, Bohdan Poręba and Mieczysław Trzeciak. Its name referred to battle of Grunwald (1410). In 1981 it consisted of circa 1200 members. The union's participants criticized Solidarity and Workers' Defence Committee. The union was labeled as antisemitic.

== Bibliography ==
- Gasztold-Seń, Przemysław (2012). Koncesjonowany nacjonalizm. Zjednoczenie Patriotyczne Grunwald 1980–1990. Instytut Pamięci Narodowej. ISBN 978-83-7629-335-6.
