= Jan Dobraczyński =

Polish writer, novelist and politician (1910–1994)

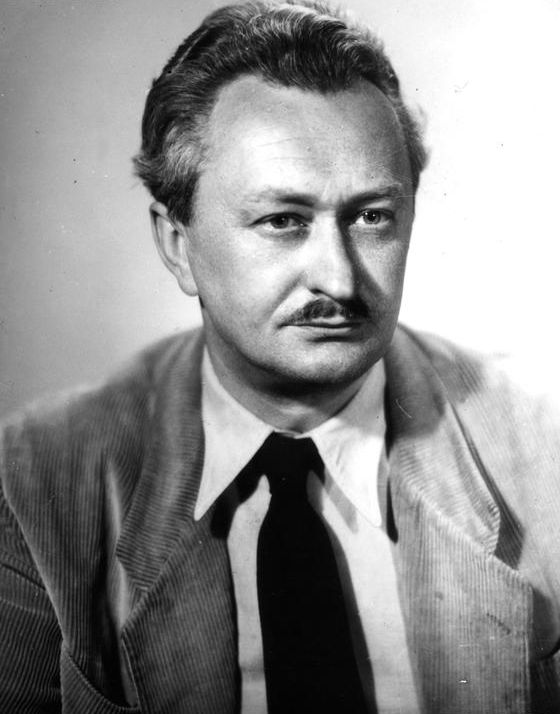

Chairman of the Patriotic Movement for National Rebirth
- In office 1982–1988

Personal details
- Born: 20 April 1910 Warsaw, Congress Poland, Russian Empire
- Died: 5 March 1994 (aged 83) Warsaw, Poland
- Resting place: Powązki Cemetery
- Party: PAX Association
- Awards: Virtuti Militari

Jan Dobraczyński (20 April 1910 – 5 March 1994) was a Polish writer, novelist, politician and Catholic publicist. In the Second Polish Republic between the two world wars, he was a supporter of the National Party and Catholic movements. During the 1939 Nazi–Soviet invasion of Poland, he was a soldier of the Polish Army and member of Armia Krajowa until the end of World War II. Dobraczyński participated in the Warsaw Uprising of 1944. After the war he supported the Polish communists. He was a member of parliament Sejms, as activist of the PAX Association and of the Patriotic Movement for National Rebirth from 1982 to 1985. He held the rank of general in the Polish military.

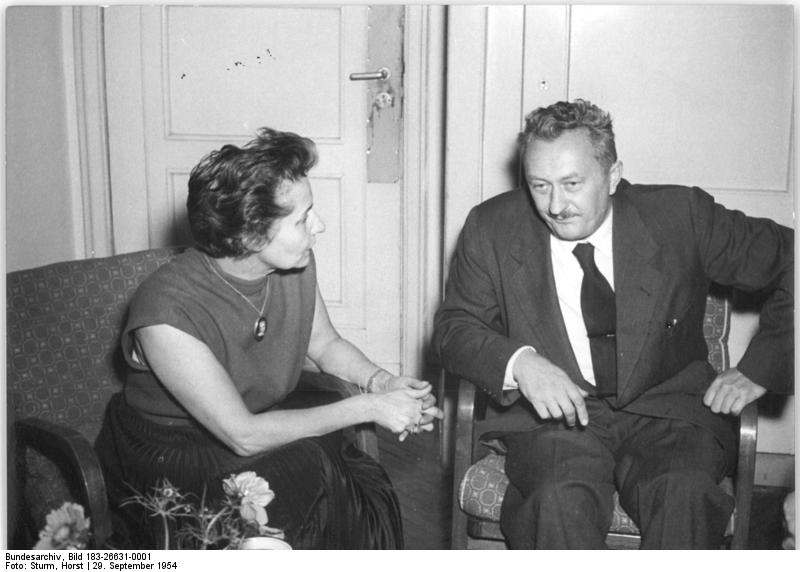
Jan Dobraczyński (right)

== The Holocaust rescue ==
During World War II, as the head of the Division for Abandoned Children at the Warsaw municipal welfare department, Jan Dobraczynski helped Żegota activists with procuring forged documents and placed several hundred Jewish children in Catholic convents. He was imprisoned in Bergen-Belsen following the Warsaw Uprising.

In 1985 Dobraczyński was awarded the Cross of Virtuti Militari. In 1986 he published his memoir titled Tylko w jednym życiu (Of One Life Only). In 1993 he was bestowed the title of the Polish Righteous Among the Nations by Yad Vashem in Jerusalem.

== Bibliography ==
- Jan Dobraczyński, Tylko w jednym życiu (Of One Life Only, memoir). Wspomnienia, 1986
- Aleksander Rogalski, Dobraczyński, 1986 (fr)
- Aleksander Rogalski, Jan Dobraczyński, 1981 (en)
- Jerzy Ziomek, Jana Dobraczyńskiego Księgi (bez) Wyjścia, in Wizerunki polskich pisarzy katolickich, 1963.
- Zygmunt Lichniak, Szkic do portretu Jana Dobraczyńskiego, 1962
- Jan Dobraczynski, "Najezdzcy" - Les Envahisseurs translated by Jean Nittman 1960

== See also ==
- Sprawy Narodu
- National Party (Poland)
- Patriotic Movement for National Rebirth
- PAX Association
