= Piotr Perkowski =

Polish composer (1901–1990)

Piotr Perkowski (17 March 1901 in Oweczacze (Овечаче, Ovechache, now Druzhne), Vinnytsia Oblast, now in Ukraine – 12 August 1990 in Otwock) was a Polish composer.

Perkowski studied at the Music Academy in Warsaw, and in Paris with Albert Roussel. He was a professor and a director at the Conservatory of Toruń (1936–1939). During World War II in occupied Poland he took part in the underground music movement, and fought in the Warsaw Uprising. After 1945, he was a composition teacher in Warsaw and Wroclaw. His pupils included Piotr Moss.

Perkowski composed film music (Żołnierz zwycięstwa, 1953), radio opera (Girlandy, 1961), five ballets, a cantata, two violin concertos and several songs.
