= Partisans (PZPR fraction) =

Informal group in the Polish United Workers' Party

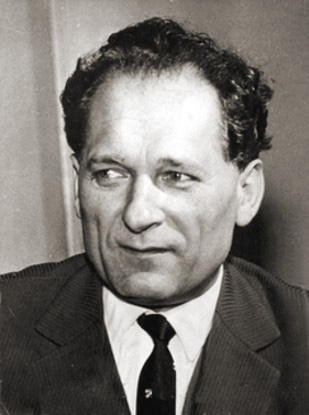
Mieczysław Moczar, the leader of the Partisans at the height of his political power in 1965.

The Partisans were an informal group in the Polish United Workers' Party. It was created in the 1960s, its main creators were Mieczysław Moczar and General Grzegorz Korczyński. The name comes from the Nazi occupation history of Moczar and Korczyński, when they commanded partisan troops and refers to the veteran ethos. The Partisans were the main representatives of Endo-Communism between the 1950s and 1970s, which was a Polish form of national communism that was seen as a mixture of Endecja ideology with Marxism-Leninism. The group was also called "the police faction" given that it controlled the security apparatus of socialist Poland, and turned it into "a well-organized and highly efficient power structure" and "a widespread network of agents and informers".

== Establishment ==
Mieczysław Moczar, as Deputy Minister and then Minister of the Interior, brought together a group of middle- and lower-tier state and party activists as well as former soldiers of the People's Army. Moczar and Korczyński also started to bring together young activists, mainly nationalist-oriented, deprived of opportunities for promotion as a result of blocking positions by the older generation. Those who did not participate in the fight against the German occupying forces due to their young age were called "patriots". Moczar also used the Society of Fighters for Freedom and Democracy to pursue his own goals, of which he was president since September 1964. Over time they gained support of members of the Political Bureau of the Central Committee of the Polish United Workers' Party, Zenon Kliszka and Ryszard Strzelecki. Grzegorz Korczyński, Franciszek Szlachcic, Teodor Kufel, Jan Czapla, Mieczysław Róg-Świostek, Tadeusz Pietrzak, Colonel Marian Janic and others were associated with the fraction of partisans. At some point, the faction was also supported by then chief of the General Staff of the Polish Army, General Wojciech Jaruzelski.

== Ideology ==
The ideology of the "Partisans" was called Endo-Communism, which Robert S. Wistrich described as "combining the assimilation of ideas with direct linkage to the prewar Endecja with proletarian rhetoric—producing a “peculiar marriage of authoritarian Communism and chauvinist nationalist tendencies". While under Władysław Gomułka the entire Polish United Workers' Party embraced ethno-nationalism to some extent, the "Partisans" represented the most radical and prominent example of ethno-nationalism, and their beliefs included a strong anti-Zionist element.

The "Partisans" preached a specific veteran ethos with elements of extreme nationalism (chauvinism). This chauvinism was directed mainly against Germans, Ukrainians, then also against Jews, following the course of the "natolinians", who were attributed a decisive role in Stalinist repression in Poland. In a more secretive manner they also directed their hostility towards the Soviets, opposing the communist partisan fighters to those who came to Poland with the Soviet army (in "greatcoats"). The faction presented itself as Communist nationalists. It has been described as national communist, antireform, and populist-nationalist.

The basis for the ideology of "partisans" was provided by numerous publications concerning the fights conducted by communist partisans, especially "Barwy Walki" by Moczar himself.

== Goals ==
Officially, the "partisans" proclaimed loyalty to Władysław Gomułka, while in unofficial contacts suggested replacing him with someone more energetic and younger.

In fact, the objective pursued was to increase influence in the Polish United Workers' Party, which was combined with the desire to remove the older generation of activists, often of Jewish origin, from their positions. For this purpose, anti-Semitism and postulates of fight against cosmopolitanism, contrasted with patriotism, were used. The support from people of Jewish origin for Israel during the Six-Day War in 1967 and the participation of children of some opposition activists in the student protests were exaggerated to this end. The actions of the "partisans" were directed mainly against the remains of the "Puławianie" group. It is not entirely clear whether the "partisans" were planning to overthrow Gomułka or whether they wanted to secure Moczar's position as a second person in the party. The climax of the role of "partisans" was constituted by anti-Semitic purges in the party and state institutions after March 1968.

The "Partisans" sought to reconfigure the national memory of the Holocaust where the ethnic Polish wartime martyrdom and suffering would be stressed instead of the emphasis of Jewish victims. This goal to change the narrative on the Holocaust resulted in the rewriting of the 8th volume of the Great Universal Encyclopedia. The original volume made a distinction between extermination camps in which almost all victims were Jews, and concentration camps where many prisoners were ethnic Poles instead. The "Partisans" accused the authors of anti-Polonism and had the volume rewritten - in the corrected version, it was instead stated that Poles and Jews suffered equally under the Holocaust.
