= Druzhne, Vinnytsia Oblast =

Village in Vinnytsia Oblast, Ukraine

Druzhne Дружне
- Village
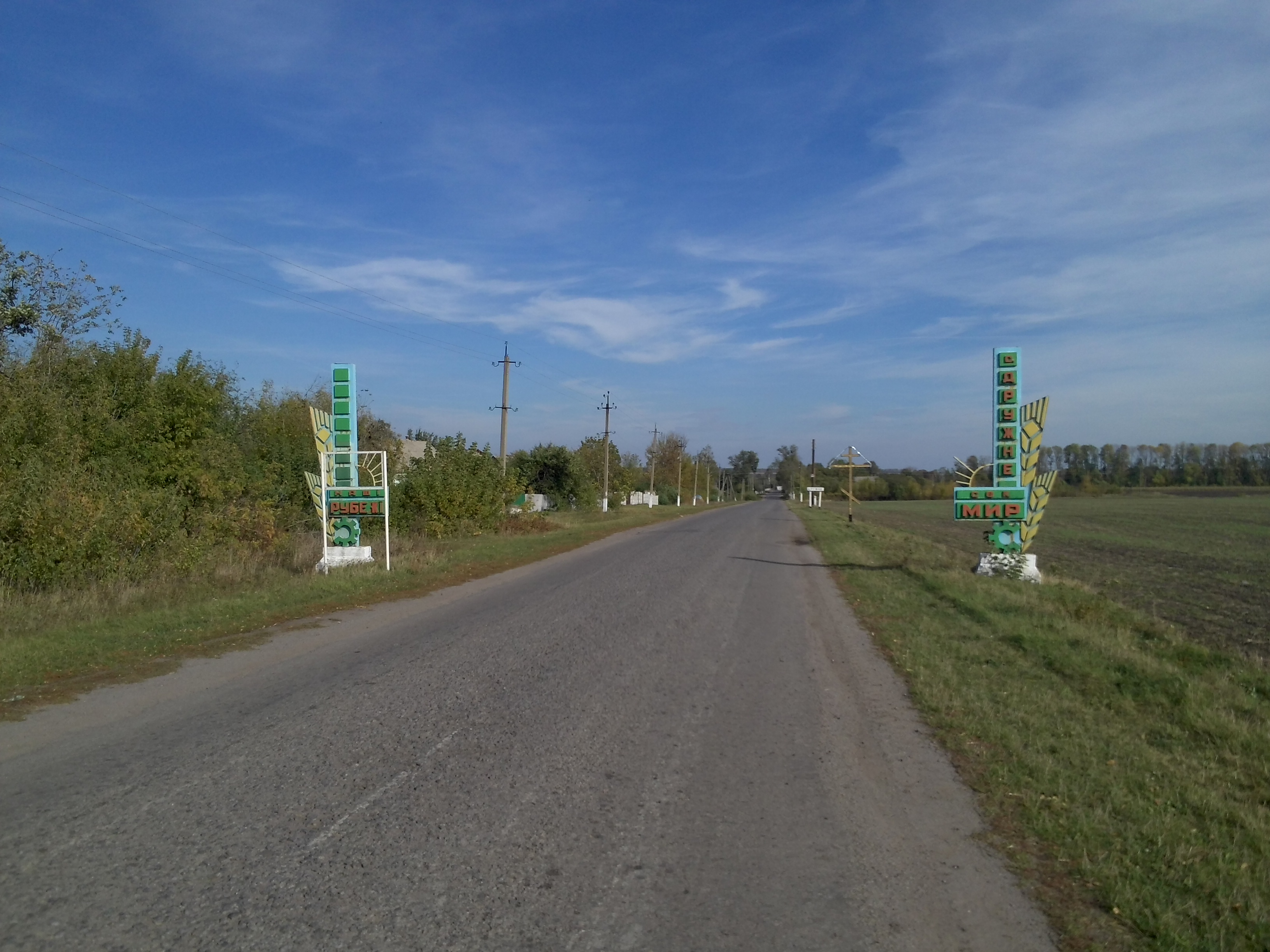

- Location of Druzhne within Vinnytsia Oblast#Location of Druzhne within Ukraine Druzhne (Ukraine)
- Coordinates: 49°27′55″N 28°48′35″E
- Country: Ukraine
- Oblast: Vinnytsia Oblast
- District: Khmilnyk Raion
- Elevation: 263 m (863 ft)

Population (2001)
  - Total: 789
- Time zone: UTC+2 (EET)
  - Summer (DST): UTC+3 (EEST)
- Postal code: 22453
- Area code: +380 4333

Druzhne (Ukrainian: Дружне) is a village in Khmilnyk Raion (district) (Note: Before the 2020 Ukraine administrative reform the place was part of the Kalynivka Raion.) in Vinnytsia Oblast of west-central Ukraine.

== Demographics ==
The distribution of native languages as of the Ukrainian Census of 2001 are:

- Ukrainian 98.73%
- Russian 1.27%
