= List of magazines in Poland =

The following is a list of notable current and defunct magazines in Poland. In the country, there are also English-language magazines in addition to those published in Polish.

In terms of frequency, the Polish magazines are mostly weeklies and monthlies. Magazines targeting youth and university students also exist in the country. As of 2013, women magazines were significant part of the press market in the country. In addition, Poland has a long tradition of architecture magazines. The first architecture magazine, Przegląd Techniczny, was published in Kraków in 1875. The country has also aviation magazines.

The number of magazines was 5,792 in 2001 whereas it increased to 6,261 in 2003. In 2014 the magazine market in the country was described as one of the higher-growth, smaller-scale markets.

== A ==
- Ahiasaf
- Archivolta
- Awedis

== B ==
- Bajtek
- Besida
- Brulion

== C ==
- Cztery Kąty
- Charaktery
- CKM
- Claudia

== D ==
- Delta
- Dialog
- Do Rzeczy
- Dobre Wnętrze
- Droga
- Dziś i Jutro

== F ==
- Fenix
- Film
- Focus
- Folks-Sztyme
- Forojs
- Forum Mleczarskie

== G ==
- Gazeta Polska
- Głos (1886–1905)
- Głos
- Gość Niedzielny
- Gwiazdka Cieszyńska

== H ==
- Hi-Fi

== J ==
- Jedność

== K ==
- Kaliszer Woch
- Kosmos. Problemy Nauk Biologicznych
- Krytyka Polityczna

== L ==
- Lotnictwo

== M ==
- Magia i Miecz
- Miasto Kobiet
- Midrasz
- Motor
- Mucha

== N ==
- Naj
- Newsweek Polska
- NIE
- Nowe Książki
- Nowe Widnokręgi

== O ==
- Odra

== P ==
- Pani
- Podróże
- Polityka
- Prosto z mostu
- Przegląd
- Przekrój

== R ==
- Rationalist
- Rycerz Niepokalanej

== S ==
- Science Fiction
- Secret Service
- Sieci
- Sprawy Narodu
- Strategie
- Świerszczyk
- Szpilki
- Sztuka i Naród

== T ==
- Teraz Rock
- Twój Styl
- Twórczość
- Tygodnik Angora
- Tygodnik Illustrowany
- Tygodnik Powszechny
- Tygodnik Solidarność
- Tylko Rock
- Tzafririm

== U ==
- Uczeń Polski
- Uważam Rze

== V ==
- Vogue Poland

== W ==
- Wanda
- Mówią Wieki
- Wprost
- Wszechświat

== Z ==
- Zwierciadło
- Zwrotnica
- Życie

== See also ==
- List of newspapers in Poland
