= Last Frontier Theatre Conference =

Renamed in 2021, the Valdez Theatre Conference is an annual conference on American Theatre held in Valdez, Alaska that focuses on playwrighting. Continually held each year since 1993, the conference puts out a call for play submissions, requesting playwrights from around the country to send one-act plays and full-length plays for consideration. Selected plays are read by actors in front of an audience, then each play is critiqued by professionals, academics in theatre, and audience members.

The Conference provides a series of workshops, symposia, theatrical productions, and panels at which participants have the opportunity to study with playwrights, directors, producers, and actors, as well as scholars and critics.

== List of notable playwrights honored and attended ==
- Edward Albee
- Robert Woodruff Anderson
- Kia Corthron
- Richard Dresser
- Scott Elliott
- Horton Foote
- Gary Garrison
- Jack Gelber
- Jessica Goldberg
- John Guare
- Rand Higbee
- Arlene Hutton
- Arthur M. Jolly
- Jon Klein
- Sherry Kramer
- Tony Kushner
- Siobhan Gilbert
- Romulus Linney
- Emily Mann
- Terrence McNally
- Scott McMorrow
- Arthur Miller
- Dawson Moore
- David Robson
- Philip Middleton Williams
- August Wilson
- Lanford Wilson
- Paula Vogel
- Y York

== List of notable actors honored and attended ==
- Angela Bassett
- Frank Collison
- John Heard
- Judd Hirsch
- Laura Linney
- Erin Dagon-Mitchell
- Patricia Neal
- Chris Noth
- Lloyd Richards
- Ron Rand
- Marian Seldes
- Libby Skala
- Courtney B. Vance
- Stockard Channing
- Jerry Stiller
- Anne Meara
