= Woch (disambiguation) =

Woch is a Polish surname.

Woch may also refer to:

- Die Woch, Yiddish-language weekly newspaper in Tel Aviv, Israel
- Kaliszer Woch, Jewish weekly magazine in Kalisz, Poland
- WOCH-CD, television station in Chicago, Illinois, United States
