= List of magazines named Focus =

Magazines with the name Focus include:

- Focus (German magazine), a German weekly news magazine
- Focus (Christian magazine), a Christian religion magazine published in the United States
- Focus (Italian magazine), an Italian popular scientific magazine
- Focus (Polish magazine), a Polish popular scientific monthly magazine
- Focus (Ukrainian magazine), a Ukrainian weekly news magazine in Russian language
- BBC Focus, a science and technology magazine published by the BBC in the United Kingdom

== See also ==
- Focus (disambiguation)
- Fokus (magazine), a Swedish weekly news magazine
