= Miasto Kobiet =

Women's magazine in Poland

- Miasto Kobiet magazine cover, issue 06/2011, November–December 2011.
- Editor: Aneta Pondo
- Staff writers: Hanna Bakuła, Karolina Macios, Monika Jurczyk Osa, Renata Kalarus
- Categories: Women's magazine Fashion magazine
- Frequency: Bi-monthly
- Publisher: ETNA (Poland)
- Founder: Aneta Pondo
- Founded: 2004
- Country: Poland
- Based in: Kraków
- Language: Polish
- Website: www.miastokobiet.pl
- ISSN: 1733-1536

Miasto Kobiet (Polish pronunciation: [ˈmjas.tɔ ˈkɔ.bjɛt], Women's City) is a Polish magazine dedicated to women. It has been issued bi-monthly since its founding in 2004. Miasto Kobiet is the organizer of recurring clothing swaps in Poland. The magazine is available in paper format as well as in electronic format, and has its own website. The founder and editor-in-chief of Miasto Kobiet is Aneta Pondo. Columnists for the magazine include Hanna Bakuła.

== Topics ==
The magazine is divided into three main sections: City, Style, and Body and Mind. Topics covered include fashion, with an emphasis on Polish fashion designers, and the lives of celebrities. Another focus of Miasto Kobiet is on events in the cities of Kraków and Warsaw; articles are directed especially to women from those cities, and there is coverage of procedures available in the local spas.

== Circulation ==
Miasto Kobiet is available, free of charge, in selected coffee shops, restaurants, office towers, spas and boutiques, and at events in Kraków and Warsaw areas.

== Staff ==
The writers of Miasto Kobiet include Hanna Bakuła, Karolina Macios, Monika Jurczyk Osa and Renata Kalarus. Aneta Pondo is the magazine's editor-in-chief.

== Social events ==
Miasto Kobiet organizes several recurring events: Szafobranie z Miastem Kobiet, Szafobranko, and Srebrne Lustra.

Szafobranie (English: wardrobe picking) is the first recurring swap event in Kraków, and is held every two months. The participants of Szafobranie exchange clothes between themselves.

Szafobranko (English: baby wardrobe picking) is a non-cash exchange for baby's and children's clothing and accessories, which is also held in the city of Kraków.

Srebrne Lustra (English: silver mirrors) is a plebiscite for the best beauty salons.

== See also ==
- List of magazines in Poland
