= TheatreWorks =

TheatreWorks may refer to:

- TheatreWorks (Silicon Valley), California
- TheaterWorks (Hartford), Connecticut
- TheatreWorksUSA
- Theatre Works (Melbourne)
- TheatreWorks (Singapore)
