= Odra (magazine) =

Polish magazine

- Front cover of Odra, №2/2015
- Editor: Mieczysław Orski
- Categories: Literary magazine
- Frequency: Monthly
- Publisher: Book Institute; Ośrodek Kultury i Sztuki we Wrocławiu
- Founded: 1961; 65 years ago
- Country: Poland
- Based in: Wrocław
- Language: Polish
- Website: Odra (archived version from 2007) okis.pl/miesiecznik-odra (currently)

Odra ([ˈɔ.dra] Polish: Miesięcznik Odra [mjɛˈɕɛnt͡ʂ.ɲik ˈɔ.dra]; Oder river in Polish) is a Polish monthly art and culture magazine which has the reputation of an opinion-maker. The magazine provides news and commentaries on art and culture in Poland and abroad.

== History and profile ==
Odra has been published in Wrocław since 1961. The publishers of the magazine, since its inception, are the Book Institute and Ośrodek Kultury i Sztuki we Wrocławiu. The magazine provides news on art and culture on monthly basis. It publishes poetry and prose, philosophical discourses, historical articles (mostly concerning the Lower Silesia and Wrocław), correspondence from abroad. It also reviews and discusses cultural events related to literature, fine arts, music and theatre. The sections inside have not changed much over the years. There is an extensive reviews section with descriptions of books, exhibitions, classical and popular records, concerts, etc. Also, there are regular columns which have included articles written by, for instance, Stanisław Lem and Wojciech Dzieduszycki. Periodically, Odra magazine is accompanied by a supplement presenting works of Silesian artists from the surrounding region.

The editor-in-chief of Odra from 1968 to 2000s was Urszula Kozioł. The magazine is edited by Mieczysław Orski.

Poets and writers who have been published by Odra are Hanna Krall, Czesław Miłosz, Zbigniew Herbert, Ryszard Kapuściński, Tadeusz Różewicz, Wisława Szymborska, Jan Miodek, Wacław Grabkowski and many poets of the younger generation such as Miłosz Biedrzycki, Jacek Dehnel, Aleksandra Ziółkowska-Boehm, Tadeusz Dąbrowski, Piotr Macierzyński, Jakobe Mansztajn, Przemysław Witkowski, Joanna Lech among others.

In October 2014 Odra was presented the Hedwig Award.

== See also ==
- List of magazines in Poland
