= Poland's response to the Russian invasion of Ukraine =

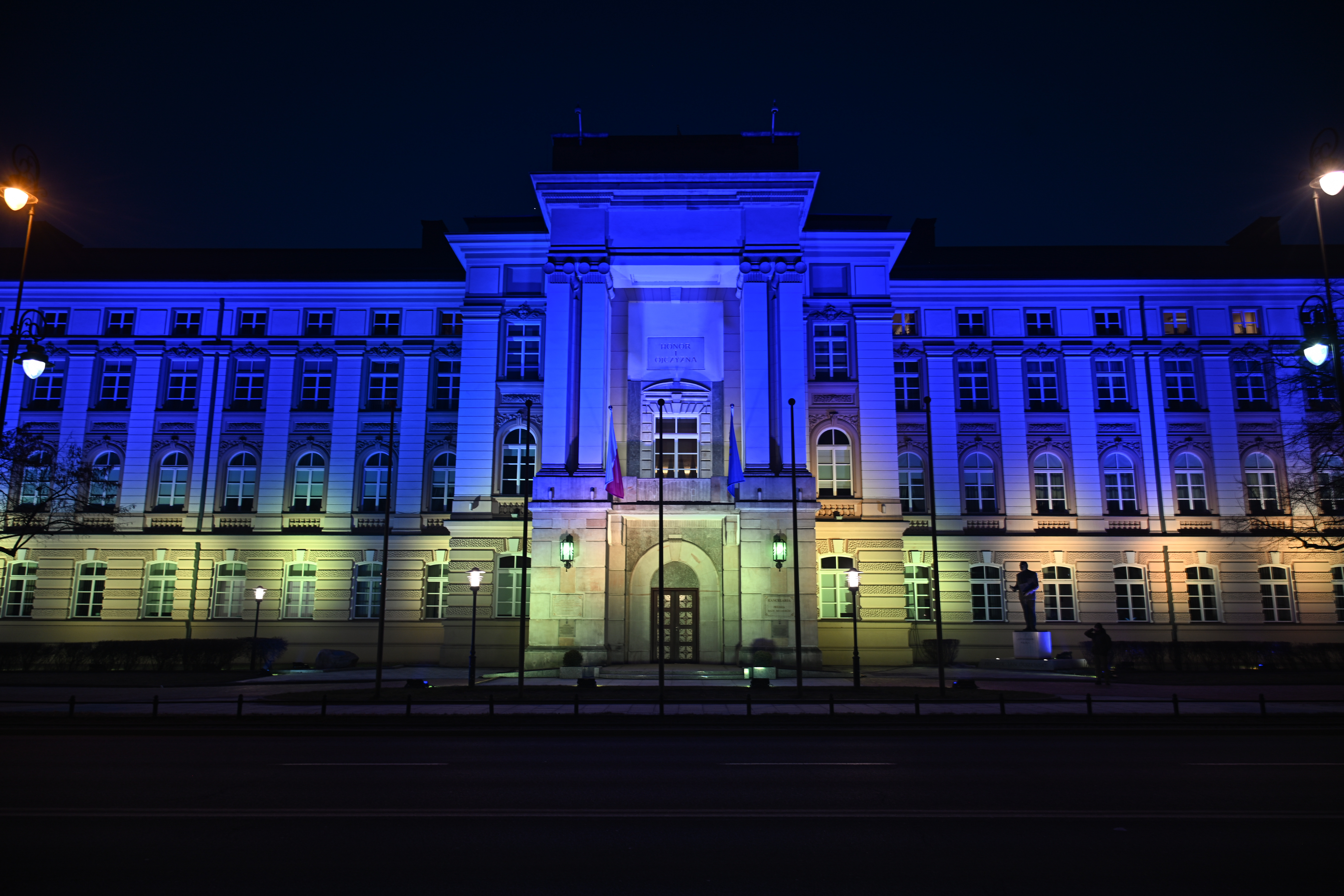
The Chancellery of the Prime Minister of Poland illuminated in the colours of the Ukrainian flag, 24 February 2025

Poland's response to the Russian invasion of Ukraine has included political, military, organisational and humanitarian support for Ukraine following the Russian invasion of Ukraine.

== Foreign and security policy ==
On 23 February 2022, the Sejm adopted by acclamation a resolution condemning all actions by the Russian Federation aimed at violating Ukraine's sovereignty. On the same day, one day before the invasion, President Andrzej Duda visited Kyiv. Later in 2022, he visited Ukraine three more times, including on 22 May, when he addressed the Verkhovna Rada. Bartosz Cichocki, Poland's ambassador in Kyiv, was the only ambassador from a European Union member state who did not leave Kyiv after the Russian invasion. In March 2022, Prime Minister Mateusz Morawiecki visited Kyiv together with the prime ministers of the Czech Republic and Slovenia and the leader of Law and Justice, Jarosław Kaczyński. It was the first high-level foreign visit to Ukraine after the outbreak of the full-scale war. Other members of the Polish government also visited Ukraine in the following months.

Political support for Ukraine continued after the change of government in Poland in December 2023. Prime Minister Donald Tusk made his first visit to Kyiv on 22 January 2024, one month after taking office. In September 2025, Kyiv was visited by Foreign Minister Radosław Sikorski and Minister of National Defence Władysław Kosiniak-Kamysz.

The Council for Cooperation with Ukraine operated within the Chancellery of the Prime Minister of Poland. From 9 April 2024 it was chaired by Paweł Kowal.

In July 2024, Poland and Ukraine concluded an agreement on security cooperation.

=== Support for Ukraine in international politics ===
On 28 February 2022, the presidents of eight Central and Eastern European states, including Poland, called for Ukraine to be granted European Union candidate status immediately and for accession negotiations to begin. Ukraine received candidate status in June 2022, and negotiations were formally opened in June 2024. During the Polish presidency of the Council of the European Union in the first half of 2025, Poland sought to open at least the first cluster in the accession negotiations and intended to present this as one of the presidency's successes. The decision, however, required unanimity and was blocked by Hungary.

Poland provided assistance to Ukraine and pressed for stronger support from its partners in numerous international formats, including the United Nations, NATO, the European Union and regional initiatives. Poland also supported strong sanctions against Russia. In April 2022, Poland adopted a sanctions act, later amended several times, and became the first country to ban imports of coal and coke from Russia and Belarus. Poland supported the confiscation of frozen European assets of the Central Bank of Russia and their transfer to Ukraine. Poland participated in the Ukraine Defense Contact Group (UDCG), including as co-chair of the armoured capability coalition. It also took part in recurring discussions within the Ukraine Recovery Conference on Ukraine's reconstruction.

=== Military support ===
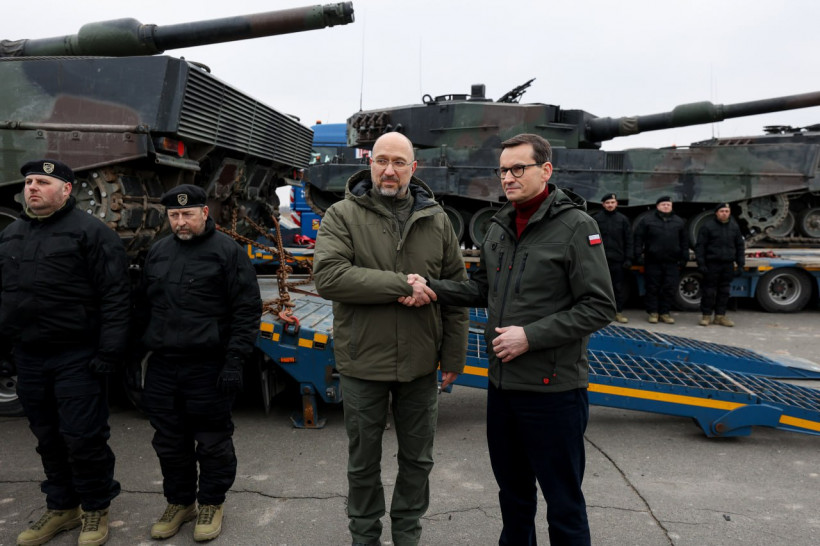
Meeting of prime ministers Denys Shmyhal and Mateusz Morawiecki on 24 February 2023 during the handover of the first four Leopard 2 tanks supplied by Poland

From the beginning of Russia's aggression against Ukraine to March 2025, the value of Polish military aid to Ukraine exceeded 18 billion złoty. Owing to its geographical location, Poland became a logistical hub for international military assistance to Ukraine; more than 90% of all military aid passed through Poland. Polish support included 318 tanks (T-72, PT-91 and Leopard 2). Poland declared the transfer of Leopard 2 tanks in January 2023, which marked a breakthrough in deliveries of modern heavy weapons to Ukraine. Polish military aid also included 536 combat vehicles of various types, mainly BMP-1 infantry fighting vehicles; 14 MiG-29 aircraft, which Poland declared in March 2023 as the first country to provide combat aircraft; 13 helicopters, including Mi-24 helicopters; and about 136 artillery systems, including AHS Krab and 2S1 Gvozdika. Poland also supplied portable anti-aircraft missile systems, including Piorun and Grom, FlyEye unmanned aerial vehicles, Warmate loitering munitions, Grot assault rifles, missiles, artillery and small-arms ammunition, medical and firefighting equipment, and personal protective equipment.

A significant part of this support was provided in the first year of the Russian invasion and was important during the early phase of Ukraine's defence against Russian aggression.

Internationally, Poland helped shape the discussion on assistance to Ukraine by opening debates on the transfer of Western-designed howitzers and tanks within the tank coalition, as well as combat aircraft.

From the Polish perspective, assistance on this scale created an opportunity to begin a major rearmament of the Polish Armed Forces and to move away from post-Soviet weaponry towards equipment meeting Western standards.

Poland also financed the operation of about 30,000 internet communication terminals, including the purchase of about 25,000 Starlink terminals.

=== Organisational support: logistics and training ===
Since February 2022, a logistics hub has operated at Rzeszów–Jasionka Airport near Rzeszów, playing a strategic role in supplying Ukraine with weapons and humanitarian aid. About 90% of military support for Ukraine, as well as humanitarian aid, passed through this hub, making it crucial for maintaining the continuity of deliveries of weapons, ammunition and spare parts for the Ukrainian army.

In addition to serving as a diplomatic hub, Rzeszów airport functioned as a medical evacuation centre for transporting Ukrainian soldiers to hospitals in Europe. A maintenance base for weapons used by Ukraine also operated in Rzeszów.

Poland took steps to include Ukraine in the European energy market. Polish state-owned companies, including Orlen and PGNiG, ensured stable supplies of liquid fuels and gas to Ukraine, stabilising the energy market in the first period after the invasion and helping to develop western supply routes. In 2023, Poland accounted for 50% of Ukrainian fuel imports from the European Union. In March 2022, the emergency synchronisation of the Ukrainian power system with the European grid was launched at high speed, with the participation of Polskie Sieci Elektroenergetyczne. Permanent integration followed at the turn of 2023 and 2024.

Work also continued on improving cross-border links. Border crossings were modernised as part of the Solidarity Lanes, and in December 2024 the new Malhowice–Nyzhankovychi road border crossing was opened.

Together with allies from NATO and the European Union, Poland carried out advisory and training activities for the Ukrainian military, including under the European Union Military Assistance Mission in support of Ukraine (EUMAM UA). Poland trained about 30,000 Ukrainian soldiers, and a key training hub, the Combined Arms Training Command (CAT-C), was located on Polish territory.

Poland also filled some positions in the command of NATO Security Assistance and Training for Ukraine (NSATU) in Wiesbaden, which coordinated material and training support for Ukraine. Since 2025, the NATO–Ukraine Joint Analysis, Training and Education Centre (JATEC) has operated in Bydgoszcz.

In 2024, under an intergovernmental agreement, Poland also offered to train Ukrainian volunteers from EU countries at Polish training grounds. In practice, however, the initiative encountered significant difficulties related to recruitment and enrolment on the Ukrainian side.

In September 2025, a training camp for Ukrainian troops was launched in Nowa Dęba.

== Migration policy and integration ==
After the start of Russia's full-scale invasion of Ukraine in February 2022, Poland became a key country of refuge for millions of Ukrainians.

=== Humanitarian aid ===
According to estimates by the Kiel Institute for the World Economy, as of June 2025 Poland ranked first in the world among countries supporting Ukraine as a share of gross domestic product when support for refugees was included. Poland provided assistance equal to 6.7% of its 2021 GDP, or about €40 billion in total, of which €35 billion was spent on supporting people under protection in Poland.

In October 2025, the Council for Cooperation with Ukraine at the Chancellery of the Prime Minister published a report on aid to Ukraine in 2022–2023. It estimated the total value of government aid expenditure in that period at 106 billion złoty.

On 25 February 2022, Poland opened the border with Ukraine by simplifying border checks and lifting the quarantine requirement for people crossing the border in the context of the COVID-19 pandemic. By the end of 2022, 8.8 million entries from Ukraine into Poland had been recorded.

By 1 July 2025, more than 2 million people had registered for temporary protection in Poland. To serve refugees, a network of reception centres was launched in all voivodeships. At its peak, the network comprised 39 centres, the largest number of them in Lublin Voivodeship. Temporary accommodation points offering meals and medical care were also opened. In 2022–2024, they were used by 546,000 people, the vast majority of them in 2022. Until mid-2024, people receiving assistance were entitled to a one-off start-up benefit of 300 złoty for basic needs. From 2022 to mid-2024, the government paid households that provided Ukrainian citizens with accommodation and meals a subsidy of 40 złoty per person per day. According to data from the Ministry of the Interior and Administration, almost 2.1 million applications were submitted in total, including 1.3 million in 2022 and 243,000 in 2024. These measures were accompanied by additional forms of assistance, including cash and in-kind collections and organised psychological support. Ukrainian citizens were also allowed to travel free of charge in second class on PKP Intercity TLK and InterCity trains in order to reduce pressure on the reception system.

=== Social policy ===
On 12 March 2022, Poland adopted a comprehensive act on assistance to Ukrainian citizens, commonly referred to as the special act. As a rule, it placed their legal situation on a similar footing to that of Polish citizens. From 16 March 2022, Ukrainian citizens who had come to Poland because of the war could apply for a PESEL-UKR number. By 2025, almost 1 million people had obtained one. People under temporary protection were granted, among other rights, access to the labour market and access to health-care benefits on the same terms as insured Polish citizens. They also received the right to use numerous social benefits, including the 500+ child benefit programme, replaced from 1 January 2024 by 800+. In subsequent years, the act was amended several times. The amendments tightened the rules, gradually phased out extraordinary measures such as subsidies for accommodation and meals, and limited the scope of rights granted to refugees. In general, the changes were intended to encourage activation and self-reliance among people under protection. On 1 July 2024, a condition was added that, in order to receive the 800+ benefit, a child had to attend school within the Polish education system. This was intended to strengthen integration into Polish society. In September 2025, a requirement concerning the parent's employment or economic activity was added. The special act established an Assistance Fund at Bank Gospodarstwa Krajowego (BGK). By mid-2025, about 31 billion złoty had been paid from the fund for social benefits, health-care benefits, accommodation and reception points, and the education of Ukrainian children. The amendment to the special act extended the legality of stay of people under protection until 4 March 2026.

=== Education policy ===
From 1 September 2024, Ukrainian children were required to attend public education on terms similar to Polish children. According to data for the first half of 2025, about 158,000 Ukrainian refugee children attended Polish educational institutions. This was an increase compared with 2022–2024, when the number ranged from 126,000 to 146,000.

According to a report by the Centrum Edukacji Obywatelskiej, if around 51,000 pupils who had started education as immigrants before 2022 are included, Ukrainian pupils accounted for about 4% of all pupils in Polish schools and were present in every third class. In the first half of 2025, there were also about 500 classes composed entirely of Ukrainian children. In 2024, the Minister of Education appointed a team for the educational integration of Ukrainian children, which dealt with their situation in schools. In 2025–2027, the EU-funded Friendly School programme, worth 500 million złoty, was implemented. Its aim was to support schools attended by pupils from Ukraine, including through co-financing the employment of intercultural assistants, available from September 2024, strengthening psychological and pedagogical support, and training staff to support pupils.

=== Integration policy ===
Integration measures were dispersed. While individual initiatives can be identified, there was no single comprehensive integration system. The main elements were access to humanitarian aid, the inclusion of people under protection in the general rules of social policy, and the introduction of compulsory education for Ukrainian children within the Polish education system. For school-age children, additional Polish language lessons were organised for 4–6 hours per week over a period of 24–36 months. According to data for the first half of 2025, 37% of children, or 71,000, attended such lessons. Integration activities for adults, including language learning, were organised on a project basis, including under the Asylum, Migration and Integration Fund (AMIF), local-government initiatives, projects run by non-governmental organisations and free university courses. One such initiative was the project "Together towards Independence", worth 93.5 million złoty and financed 90% by the European Commission. It was run in 2024–2026 by the Ministry of the Interior and Administration in cooperation with the Polish Red Cross and the Polish Center for International Aid Foundation. Ukrainian citizens under temporary protection who lived in collective accommodation centres could receive financial support, including rent subsidies, as well as vocational counselling and Polish language lessons.

== Economy and trade ==
=== Trade between Poland and Ukraine ===
From 2022, exports from Poland to Ukraine increased sharply. Their value was €6.3 billion in 2021, compared with €9.7 billion in 2022, €11.4 billion in 2023 and €13.1 billion in 2024, meaning that the value of exports more than doubled overall. In the first half of 2025, a further increase of 6.9% was recorded. At the same time, the share of exports to Ukraine in total Polish exports rose from 2.2% in 2021 to 2.8% in 2022 and 3.6% in 2025. Ukraine became Poland's seventh-largest export market, while Poland became Ukraine's second-largest supplier after China. The increase resulted primarily, though not exclusively, from supplies of war-related products, including fuels, vehicles, weapons and machinery. Imports from Ukraine to Poland fluctuated. Their value was €4.2 billion in 2021, rose to €6 billion in 2022 because of increased inflows of agricultural products following the easing of market-access rules, then fell to €4.4 billion in 2023 after Poland introduced import restrictions, and reached €4.8 billion in 2024. Poland became Ukraine's largest export market. In 2024, total trade in goods between Poland and Ukraine amounted to about €17.9 billion, with a Polish surplus of about €8.3 billion.

=== Conflict over agricultural trade ===
From June 2022 to June 2025, so-called autonomous trade measures (ATM) applied in Ukraine–European Union relations. They consisted of the European Union suspending customs duties and tariff quotas on exports from Ukraine. This was a solidarity measure connected, among other things, with Russia's blockade of maritime trade.

In 2023, agricultural imports became politically controversial in Poland because of disruptions on the domestic market. Suspicions of grain price undercutting concerned, among other things, shipments declared as "technical grain", such as animal feed, which later reached the food market. In April 2023, Poland unilaterally banned imports of a wide range of agricultural products from Ukraine, although after several days it allowed sealed transit under supervision. In May, the European Commission introduced narrower temporary safeguard measures, namely a ban on imports of four grains into five frontline countries. After these measures expired, the Polish government issued another regulation in September banning imports of selected agricultural products. This drew criticism from the European Commission and a complaint by Ukraine to the World Trade Organization (WTO).

From November 2023 to January 2024, Polish hauliers, soon joined by farmers, blocked border crossings with Ukraine, seriously restricting border traffic. In February 2024, farmers resumed the blockades, during which widely reported incidents occurred involving grain being dumped from Ukrainian transports. The farmers' protest was linked to allegations that shipments intended for transit were leaking in significant quantities onto the Polish agricultural market. A November 2023 report by the Supreme Audit Office stated that from January 2022 to April 2023 most of the 4.3 million tonnes of grain and oilseed crops worth 6.2 billion złoty that had arrived from Ukraine remained in Poland. This was, however, before the introduction of supervised sealed-transit rules by the National Revenue Administration.

From June 2024, new safeguard mechanisms applied under the ATM system, introducing import brakes for selected agricultural products once relevant quantitative thresholds were exceeded. The expiry of the ATM system in June 2025 meant a return to the more restrictive rules on agricultural trade provided for in the EU–Ukraine Association Agreement, based on customs duties and tariff quotas, which was in line with the position of the Polish government.

At the same time, Poland's role in transporting Ukrainian agricultural exports declined. According to European Commission data, 80% of grain was transported by sea and 20% through Solidarity Lanes, with only a minority passing through Polish territory. In further negotiations, Poland supported Ukraine's adjustment to EU standards and greater EU access to the Ukrainian market.

In October 2025, a new EU–Ukraine trade agreement entered into force. It updated the free-trade framework under the Association Agreement, introducing rules that were more restrictive than the ATM format but more liberal than the rules in force before 2022. The Polish government supported the new rules at EU level.

=== State support for Polish companies operating in Ukraine ===
According to an estimate by the Centre for Eastern Studies, about 600 companies with Polish capital operated in Ukraine. According to the Polish Investment and Trade Agency, Polish companies operated primarily in the agri-food, construction and infrastructure, medical and pharmaceutical, transport and logistics, energy, insurance and IT/ICT sectors. Poland undertook efforts to increase its economic presence in Ukraine, especially in connection with the country's reconstruction in the context of the expected end of the war. In July 2025, the Team Poland initiative was launched. It brought together Polish development institutions from the Polish Development Fund Group, including the Polish Development Fund, Bank Gospodarstwa Krajowego, the Polish Investment and Trade Agency, the Polish Agency for Enterprise Development, the Industrial Development Agency and the Export Credit Insurance Corporation (KUKE). The initiative integrated activities supporting the development of Polish business. Its first programme was Team Poland for Ukraine, under which participating institutions offered services for Polish companies wishing to invest in Ukraine, including bank guarantees and preferential loans.

The March 2025 amendment to the act on development cooperation enabled BGK to act internationally as a development bank. The bank planned activities under the Ukraine Facility, a programme run by the European Commission. The bank also provided loans to Ukrainian banks financing imports to Poland; by August 2025 it had financed letters of credit worth €8.9 million. The presence of institutions from the PFR Group in Ukraine also increased. In December 2024, BGK's representative office in Kyiv began operating. In August 2024, the Polish Investment and Trade Agency opened an office in Lviv, in addition to its Kyiv office, which had operated since 2018.

=== Work and business activity of Ukrainians in Poland ===
According to a Deloitte report for the UNHCR, about 69% of working-age refugees from Ukraine were employed in 2024, only slightly below the employment level of Polish citizens in the same period, which was 75%.

The contribution of Ukrainian refugees to GDP was 1.5% in 2022, 2.3% in 2023 and 2.7% in 2024. This would mean that their contribution to Polish GDP was more than half again as high as the cost to the state of supporting people under temporary protection. Median earnings were about 80% of the national median. According to data from the Polish Economic Institute, from 2022 to April 2025 about 88,500 sole proprietorships run by Ukrainian citizens were registered in Poland. By July 2025, Ukrainian citizens had also registered about 13,000 companies.

== Culture and memory ==
=== Activities of cultural institutions in support of Ukraine ===
Aid to Ukraine in response to the Russian invasion was widespread in the cultural sector. Cultural institutions also commonly organised activities for refugee children. Polish institutions offered scholarships and residencies to Ukrainian artists. For example, the National Institute of Music and Dance organised four editions of an artistic residency programme for Ukrainian citizens in 2022–2025, with a total value of more than 6 million złoty. Similar programmes were offered by the Adam Mickiewicz Institute, the Zachęta National Gallery of Art and the Zbigniew Raszewski Theatre Institute. In 2022, the Polish Film Institute allocated 10 million złoty to joint Polish-Ukrainian projects, with preference given to Ukrainian citizens who had arrived after 24 February 2022. The Book Institute printed more than 80,000 children's books in Ukrainian and delivered them to Polish public libraries. It also sent 30,000 books by Polish authors in Ukrainian translation to more than 1,400 libraries in Ukraine. In April 2022, the National Institute of Museums recorded that 116 museums had become involved in aid to Ukraine through 200 initiatives. Long-running programmes also continued, including the National Centre for Culture's Gaude Polonia scholarships for artists; in 2025, 26 of 48 recipients were from Ukraine. The National Centre for Culture organises annual Polish-Ukrainian youth exchanges.

In March 2025, the Polish public broadcaster Telewizja Polska launched the Ukrainian-language editorial office Slawa TV.

=== Protection of Ukrainian cultural works ===
Ukrainian culture was an important target of the Russian attack, which included denial of the independence and distinctiveness of Ukrainian national identity. At the time of the invasion, the Polish government regarded support for the protection of Ukrainian culture as a particularly important task. The activities of a team of the Ministry of Culture and National Heritage, established on 23 February 2022 to assist in the protection of cultural heritage, were coordinated by the Centre for Assistance to Culture in Ukraine at the National Institute of Cultural Heritage. The centre effectively ended its work in June 2024. These activities were carried out in cooperation with several international partners and in regular contact with the Ukrainian side, which identified its needs. In 2022, Poland allocated, among other things, €2 million to support 111 Ukrainian cultural institutions. In 2023, it allocated 4 million złoty to 60 institutions, providing materials for securing collections as well as practical expertise. The Polonika Institute secured more than 200 historic objects and prepared three-dimensional scans of 41 objects, mainly religious buildings. In 2022, Poland allocated €1 million to the digitisation of Ukraine's cultural heritage as part of work by the countries of the Lublin Triangle: Poland, Ukraine and Lithuania. In 2024, Poland, Lithuania, Latvia, Estonia and Ukraine signed an agreement in Lublin on cooperation and the protection of shared archival heritage. To express solidarity with Ukraine and promote knowledge of Ukrainian culture, numerous cultural institutions across Poland organised performances by Ukrainian artists and presented their works from 2022 onward. For example, in spring 2024 an exhibition of works by Maria Prymachenko was held at the Museum of Modern Art in Warsaw, and in 2025 the Royal Castle in Warsaw exhibited collections from the Khanenko Museum in Kyiv.

=== Documentation of crimes related to Russian aggression ===
On 28 February 2022, the Polish prosecutor's office opened an investigation into the war of aggression and war crimes committed by Russia on Ukrainian territory. The investigation was conducted in cooperation with the Internal Security Agency and the National Police Headquarters. More than 3,000 witnesses were questioned and nearly 40 incidents bearing the characteristics of war crimes were identified. On 25 March 2022, a Joint Investigation Team (JIT) of Ukraine, Poland and Lithuania was established to strengthen cooperation between prosecutors' offices. Estonia, Latvia, Slovakia and Romania later joined it, as did the International Criminal Court in The Hague and Europol. Poland took part in creating the Core International Crimes Evidence Database (CICED), run by Eurojust. Poland also joined work on a register of damage under the Council of Europe; a Polish representative sat on its board. Poland supported the establishment of a special tribunal to prosecute the crime of aggression against Ukraine. The Pilecki Institute established the Rafał Lemkin Centre for Documenting Russian Crimes in Ukraine, which collected about 1,600 testimonies from civilians.

=== Polish memory policy ===
Even before the Russian invasion, Poland had submitted applications in Ukraine for searches and exhumations of victims, including victims of the Volhynia massacres, in order to commemorate them with dignity. Since 2017, the Ukrainian side had not consented to such work. On 2 June 2022, the culture ministries of Poland and Ukraine adopted a memorandum of cooperation in the field of national remembrance. On 2 November 2022, the Freedom and Democracy Foundation received preliminary consent from the Ukrainian side to conduct searches in Puzhnyky. In May 2023, a diplomatic incident occurred when the spokesman of the Polish Ministry of Foreign Affairs, Łukasz Jasina, stated in an interview that President Volodymyr Zelenskyy "should" apologise to Poles for Volhynia, which provoked a sharp reaction from the Ukrainian ambassador in Warsaw. On 9 July 2023, Presidents Andrzej Duda and Volodymyr Zelenskyy attended a service in the cathedral in Lutsk, where, according to a joint declaration, they paid tribute to "the innocent victims of Volhynia". Critics viewed this as blurring the memory of the perpetrators. On 11 July 2023, the Sejm adopted a resolution stating that "conducting exhumations, dignified burials and commemorating all victims of the genocide in the Eastern Borderlands" was of fundamental importance for Polish-Ukrainian reconciliation. On the same day, Piotr Gliński and Oleksandr Tkachenko, the culture ministers of Poland and Ukraine, lit candles at the monument to the victims of genocide in Volhynian Square in Warsaw. In November 2024, Radosław Sikorski and Andrii Sybiha, the foreign ministers of Poland and Ukraine, issued a joint statement saying that there were no obstacles to Poland conducting search and exhumation work on Ukrainian territory in cooperation with the relevant Ukrainian institutions. In January 2025, the Ukrainian authorities consented to an exhumation in Puzhnyky. Work began in April, and in September funeral ceremonies were held for 42 victims of the Ukrainian Insurgent Army. In June 2025, President Andrzej Duda signed a law, adopted almost unanimously by the Sejm, establishing 11 July as the National Day of Remembrance of the Victims of the Genocide Committed by Ukrainian Nationalists against Citizens of the Second Polish Republic. In July 2025, President Karol Nawrocki appealed to President Zelenskyy for consent to "full-scale exhumations" in Volhynia.

== Public opinion ==
=== Public involvement in aid to Ukraine ===
The reaction of Polish society and Polish non-governmental organisations to the Russian invasion of Ukraine significantly helped to prevent a humanitarian crisis after February 2022. According to a report by the Polish Economic Institute, in the first months of the full-scale war 77% of Poles became involved in helping Ukraine, 35% in organisational assistance and volunteering, and 7% hosted refugees in their homes. Around 10% helped with learning Polish or finding work and schools. According to estimates by the Polish Economic Institute, in the first three months alone Poles allocated 9–10 billion złoty in private funds to aid. Fundraisers for humanitarian and military purposes were a popular form of assistance. One widely publicised example was the "Bayraktar for Ukraine" fundraiser launched by Sławomir Sierakowski, which raised almost 25 million złoty. In CBOS surveys, the share of respondents declaring that they had provided assistance, such as material or financial support, ranged from 63% in April 2022 to 32% at the end of 2023. At the same time, qualitative research showed that over time, roughly from the summer of 2022, people providing help and non-governmental organisations supporting refugees began to experience "aid fatigue", also described as compassion fatigue, and emotional burnout caused by overwork and long-term exposure to difficult problems. This is a known and documented process in similar social situations and means that helpers themselves also need support.

=== Growing Polish-Ukrainian tensions ===
From 2023, resentment towards Ukraine increased in the Polish public sphere. The main flashpoints discussed in Poland included statements by Ukraine's ambassador in Berlin, Andriy Melnyk, favourable to Stepan Bandera in July 2022; the explosion of a Ukrainian missile in Przewodów, which killed two Poles and whose origin Kyiv initially denied, in November 2022; farmers' protests connected with the liberalisation of trade with Ukraine in spring 2023; the summoning of the Polish ambassador to the Ukrainian foreign ministry in August 2023; and a statement by President Zelenskyy at the United Nations in September 2023 that Polish trade policy was helping Moscow. Apart from specific events, critical voices most often repeated claims that Ukraine had "not shown sufficient gratitude" for Poland's assistance, had not distanced itself from the criminal legacy of Banderism, had obstructed exhumations of victims of the genocide in Volhynia, had done little to reduce tensions, and that some of its diplomats or politicians behaved provocatively.

=== Poles on Ukraine in public opinion surveys ===
According to CBOS, in March 2022 94% of Poles supported accepting refugees from Ukraine, and for the rest of the year support remained above 80%. A clear decline began in spring 2023, around the same time as the first conflicts over agricultural trade. At the end of 2024, a majority of respondents, 57%, still expressed support, but in the September 2025 survey support fell to 48%. At the same time, a record 50% of respondents agreed with the view that the aid provided by Poland to Ukrainian refugees was too large, a sharp increase compared with earlier readings; since 2022, results recorded at half-year intervals had fluctuated between 18% and 30%. Sympathy towards Ukrainians reached a record 51% at the beginning of 2023, fell to 40% in 2024 and reached 30% at the beginning of 2025, the lowest result since 2018. The level of antipathy in 2025 was 38%, compared with 17% in 2023. This meant that a qualitative change occurred in 2025, when the level of antipathy exceeded the level of sympathy. In 2022–2023, about 60% of Poles believed that Ukraine should continue fighting and make no concessions, while 23–32% believed that Ukraine should primarily seek peace, even at the cost of territorial concessions or concessions concerning independence. These proportions began to change in 2024, and the turning point came at the end of 2024, when preferences reversed and 55% of respondents supported primarily seeking peace. Throughout the period studied, nearly 40% of Poles consistently believed that NATO's actions in relation to the war were too cautious, while the percentage of people who considered them too far-reaching increased from 3% to 13%. According to a June 2025 survey by IBRiS, 52% of Poles supported diplomatic support for Ukraine and 35% supported economic support. According to 35% of respondents, military assistance should remain at its current level, while 46% believed it should be reduced (26%) or stopped (20%). In turn, 37% of respondents supported Ukraine's accession to NATO and 35% supported its accession to the European Union; in both cases, 42% were opposed. Sixty-four percent opposed sending Polish soldiers to Ukraine as part of a peacekeeping mission. According to an August 2025 survey by the same polling organisation, 54% of respondents assessed the impact of the presence of Ukrainian citizens on the Polish economy positively. In surveys, voters of the coalition parties in the Donald Tusk government consistently held more favourable views of Ukraine than supporters of Law and Justice and Confederation Liberty and Independence.

=== Ukraine in the Polish media space ===
The image of Ukraine in the media evolved in a similar way to public opinion, although critical sentiment towards Ukraine appeared to be clearly weaker in mainstream media than in society as a whole. This was one of the areas in which traditional and social media diverged. In 2022, publications expressing solidarity with Ukraine dominated. They described the realities of war and the provision of humanitarian aid, with particular emphasis on the stories of individuals and communities affected by the Russian invasion. Content critical of Russia and expressions of recognition for Ukraine's highly effective international information campaign were also common. In the following years, there was no major change in the approach of traditional media towards Ukraine. The intensity of coverage decreased, but publications about the war and opinions stressing the need to support Ukraine in the face of Russian aggression continued to dominate. At the same time, internet researchers, including NASK, noted the growing importance of disinformation campaigns in social media. These campaigns used crisis situations to spread their message, with the main goal of making Ukraine and Ukrainians appear repellent to audiences. Among the alarming observations was that after Russian drones entered Polish airspace in September 2025, a high share of comments, probably partly amplified artificially, falsely attributed responsibility to Ukraine rather than Russia.

== Bibliography ==
- Lubow Akułenko; Ołeksandra Bułana; Sniżana Diaczenko; Serhij Herasymczuk; Maria Hołubycka; Jewhen Mahda (2025). "Ukraina-Polska: audyt współpracy i inicjatyw 2022–2025" [Ukraine–Poland: audit of cooperation and initiatives 2022–2025]. In Sariusz-Skąpska, Izabella (ed.). Solidarność i rozczarowanie: Bilans relacji polsko-ukraińskich w latach 2022–2025 [Solidarity and disappointment: The balance of Polish-Ukrainian relations in 2022–2025] (PDF) (in Polish). Stefan Batory Foundation. pp. 31–58. ISBN 978-83-68235-91-3.
- Sawczuk, Tomasz (2025). "Polityka Polski wobec Ukrainy w latach 2022–2025" [Poland's policy towards Ukraine in 2022–2025]. In Sariusz-Skąpska, Izabella (ed.). Solidarność i rozczarowanie: Bilans relacji polsko-ukraińskich w latach 2022–2025 [Solidarity and disappointment: The balance of Polish-Ukrainian relations in 2022–2025] (PDF) (in Polish). Stefan Batory Foundation. pp. 11–29. ISBN 978-83-68235-91-3.
- Siewiera, Jacek (2025). "Zarys polskiej polityki zagranicznej względem Ukrainy – współpraca wojskowa oraz zbrojeniowa" [Outline of Polish foreign policy towards Ukraine: military and armaments cooperation]. In Sariusz-Skąpska, Izabella (ed.). Solidarność i rozczarowanie: Bilans relacji polsko-ukraińskich w latach 2022–2025 [Solidarity and disappointment: The balance of Polish-Ukrainian relations in 2022–2025] (PDF) (in Polish). Stefan Batory Foundation. pp. 59–69. ISBN 978-83-68235-91-3.
