= Dialog (magazine) =

Polish literary magazine

Dialog (Dialogue) is the only magazine in Poland which regularly publishes contemporary Polish and foreign plays. This is not to be confused with the quarterly magazine with the same name Dialog; which focuses on Polish-German relations.

For years, it has been the most important source of the modern repertoire from all over the world for Polish theatres, and besides the plays themselves, it has also been providing information concerning the most important foreign premieres. It has been publishing articles dedicated to the theatre and the play writing and it has been working in the field of anthropology of theatre.

The magazine was founded in 1956 by Adam Tarn, a translator, playwright and journalist. The following editors of the magazine were, among others, Konstanty Puzyna and Jerzy Koenig. For over ten years, the magazine has been headed by Jacek Sieradzki. Dialog's task is to publish the newest Polish plays.

Each issue of the magazine contains one or two domestic contemporary plays, which were previously neither published nor staged. From here they reach the stages of Polish theatres. The magazine is therefore an important forum for playwright debuts; several generations of Polish playwrights begun their careers from a publication in Dialog. At the same time, the most important mission of the magazine is to provide quick and competent information to the Polish reader, concerning the current theatrical life outside Poland, and for many years Dialog was the only opening to the Western world for Polish directors, translators, literary directors, the community interested in theatre and theatrical literature. Other than Polish plays, each issue contained translations of the most important international plays and theoretical texts dedicated to the creation of the most outstanding western authors.

Dialog has published almost all of the most outstanding Polish playwrights, among others: Sławomir Mrożek, Tadeusz Różewicz, Janusz Głowacki, as well as accomplished foreign authors, including Samuel Beckett, Jean Genet, Eugène Ionesco, Heiner Müller, and from the younger generation Mark Ravenhill, Jon Fosse, Marius von Mayenburg, Sergi Belbel, and David Robson.

Since 2010, the publisher of Dialog is the Polish Book Institute.

== See also ==
- List of magazines in Poland
