= Wacław Grabkowski =

Polish writer

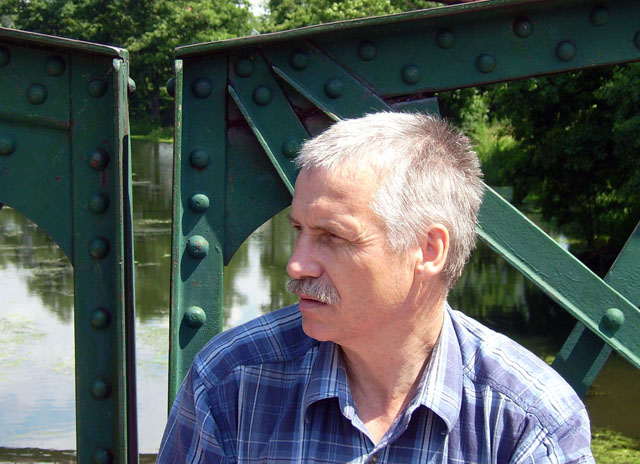
Wacław Grabkowski in 2007

Wacław Grabkowski (born 28 March 1953) is a Polish novelist, short story writer and poet. He is an author of books for adults and teenagers. He has been a member of the Polish Writers Association since 2000.

== Biography ==
Grabkowski was born on 28 March 1953 in Wrocław. His first published work was a collection of poems published in Sigma magazine in 1979. In 2000, his short story Wypalacz drutu ("A Man Who Burns Wire") won the First Prize from the Polish Writers Association and monthly magazine Odra. Another short story, Wrocław i trzy harmonie ojca ("Wrocław and father's three harmonicas"), won the First Prize from the Wrocław's Millennium Celebrations Office (Biuro Obchodów Milenium Wrocławia) and Odra magazine. In 2003, his second novel Dzieci z Wilczego Kąta ("Children of Wolf's Corner"), won the First Prize in the competition for a contemporary novel, awarded and published by the publishing house ATUT. His third novel Park Wschodni ("The East Park"), won the Second Prize in a national competition for a Polish contemporary novel awarded and published by Wydawnictwo Dolnośląskie (The Silesian Publishing) in 2006.

== Published works ==
Novels and short stories:

- 1979: collection of poems published by Sigma magazine.
- 1993: Szczupaczek i inne opowiadania ("Pike and other stories"), self-published
- 1998: Wchodzisz Gdy Świt ("You enter when the dawn"), published by the publishing house ATUT, is a collection of poems written between 1978 and 1982.
- 1998: Guz w Fiołkach ("Iron in the Violets"), self-published, a story about young Poles, Jews, Greeks and Germans living in the vicinity of Wolf Street in 1960's Wrocław, which has become their own little homeland.
- 2000: Wypalacz Drutu ("A Man Who Burns Wire"), published by the Library of the Association of Polish Writers (Biblioteka Stowarzyszenia Pisarzy Polskich), won the First Prize from the Association of Polish Writers (Stowarzyszenie Pisarzy Polskich) and monthly magazine Odra. It is a collection of short stories, which take place in a city struck by a great flood. It portrays a tramp-philosopher who fears for the future of a consumer driven world.
- 2002: Dziewczyna Kosmity i inne opowiadania ("Alien's Girlfriend and other stories"), published by Swiadectwo, is a collection of stories spanning 30 years of Communist Poland, and the formation of a new democracy. One of the stories, Wrocław i trzy harmonie ojca ("Wrocław and father's three harmonicas"), won the First Prize from the Wrocław's Millennium Celebrations Office (Biuro Obchodów Milenium Wrocławia) and Odra magazine.
- 2003: Dzieci z Wilczego Kąta ("Children of Wolf's Corner"), won the First Prize in the competition for a contemporary novel, awarded and published by the publishing house ATUT. The story portrays a boy of Russian and German descent, who is born after the conquest of the Fortress Breslau (Festung Breslau) by the Russians. After the death of his parents, he is raised by a Pole, and no longer sees himself as either Russian or German.
- 2006: Park Wschodni ("The East Park"), won the Second Prize in a national competition for a Polish contemporary novel awarded by Wydawnictwo Dolnośląskie (The Silesian Publishing) and was published in 2006. The novel is about an impending global catastrophe, predicted by ordinary people.
- 2007: Kapelusz i Bandana ("Hat and a Bandana"), published by the Library of the Association of Polish Writers (Biblioteka Stowarzyszenia Pisarzy Polskich), consists of four stories in which the author portrays two contrasting characters of a thinker and a rebel, questioning the traditions that suppress spiritual development in the Christian faith.
- 2007: Mało im naszych łez? Dziennik z czasów powolnego upadku komunizmu 1980-2007 ("Haven't we shed enough tears? Journal from the time of the slow collapse of Communism, 1980-2007"), self-published.
- 2021: Sernik i inne wypieki ("Cheesecake and other baked goods"), published by Bel-druk. A novel set in the present day with elements of fantasy.
- 2022: Ze snu na wyspę Hiva Oa ("From a Dream to the Hiva Oa Island"), published by Wydawnictwo Akwedukt Klubu Muzyki i Literatury, the novel combines fantasy and oneiric motifs with elements inspired by the anthropology of Pacific Islanders.
