= Droga =

Monthly magazine

Droga (Polish pronunciation: [ˈdrɔ.ɡa], Polish for 'road') was a monthly magazine dedicated to literary and social topics. It was published in Nazi-occupied Warsaw from December 1943 to April 1944. Its founders were Ewa Pohoska and Juliusz Garztecki.

== See also ==
- List of magazines in Poland
