= Naj =

Polish lifestyle magazine

- Categories: Women's magazine Lifestyle magazine
- Frequency: Fortnightly
- Circulation: 343,152 (2010)
- First issue: 1994; 32 years ago
- Company: Bauer Media Group
- Country: Poland
- Based in: Warsaw
- Language: Polish
- ISSN: 2299-2162
- OCLC: 749179488

Naj is a Polish language fortnightly lifestyle and women's magazine published in Warsaw, Poland.

== History and profile ==
Naj was started in 1994 by Gruner + Jahr company. The magazine has its headquarters in Warsaw. It was published on a weekly basis by Gruner+Jahr Polska. Later it began to be published fortnightly. The magazine was sold to Bauer Media Group, another German company, in February 2012. Then it became a supplement of Tina, a biweekly magazine.

Naj covers articles on health, fashion and beauty.

In 1997 Naj had a circulation of about 750,000 copies. In 2010 the circulation of the magazine was 343,152 copies.

== See also ==
- List of magazines in Poland
