= David Robson (playwright) =

American playwright and educator (born 1966)

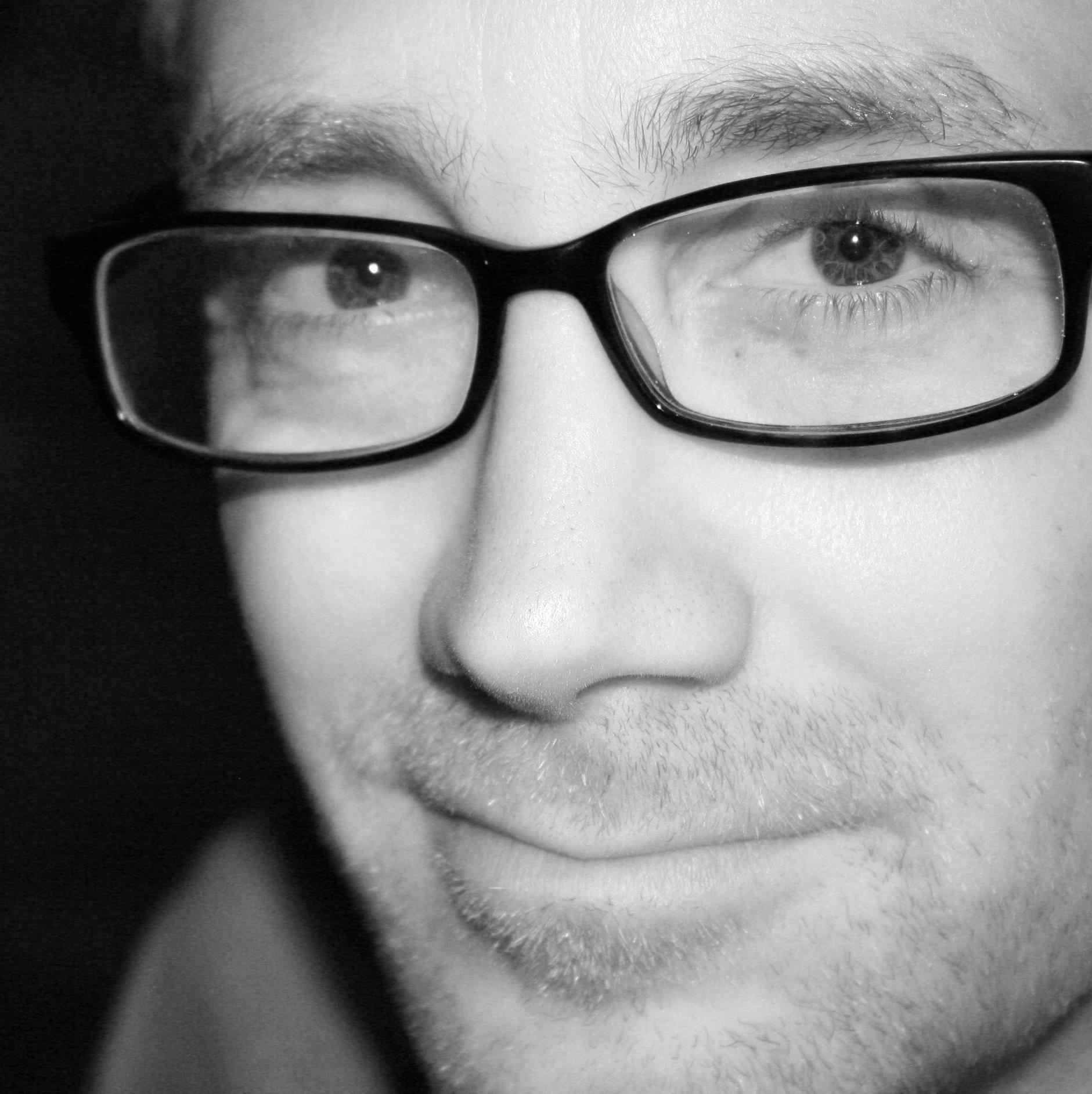
David Robson in 2010

David Robson (born September 11, 1966) is an American playwright, writer, and educator from Philadelphia, Pennsylvania. He has written more than thirty plays, including Playing the Assassin, After Birth of a Nation, Muleheaded, or Zora and Langston Write a Play, Blues in My Soul, Without Consent, Killing Neil LaBute, and Man Measures Man, and more than 20 books for young adult readers on subjects ranging from social justice to history to mythology. Robson is a professor of English at Delaware County Community College. He is married to actress and photographer Sonja Robson and is currently based in Wilmington, Delaware.

== Education ==
Robson attended the William Penn Charter School before earning a B.A. in Communications from Temple University, an M.S. in English Education from Saint Joseph's University, and an M.F.A. in Creative Writing from Goddard College in Plainfield, Vermont.

== Career ==
=== Theater ===
Some of Robson's earliest works were produced by InterAct Theatre Company. Since then, his plays have been produced and presented by TheaterWorks (Hartford), Penguin Rep, Delaware Theatre Company, the Last Frontier Theatre Conference, Act II Playhouse, The Lark, Theatre Exile, Passage Theatre, City Theater Company, Idiopathic Ridiculopathy Consortium, Bated Breath Theatre, Great Plains Theatre Conference, and New Theatre, among others. Robson credits his mother for his initial interest in theater, along with the work of Albert Camus, Edward Albee, Samuel Beckett, Sam Shepard, and Ted Tally.

=== Academia ===
Robson began his teaching career at Delaware County Community College in the fall of 2002. There he teaches courses in composition, creative writing, and film. He received the Gould Award for Teaching Excellence in 2010. At the 2014 Association of Writers & Writing Programs in Seattle, Washington, Robson and co-presenters Lloyd Noonan, Nancy McCurry, and Paul Pat presented "New Approach to Teaching Creative Writing to Senior Citizens".

== Works ==
=== Plays (selected) ===
- Man Measures Man, first produced by InterAct Theatre Company and The Lark
- Out of Place, developed at the Last Frontier Theatre Conference
- Killing Neil Labute, developed at the Great Plains Theatre Conference
- A Few Small Repairs
- After Denmark
- Playing Leni (with John Stanton), developed and produced by Madhouse Theater Company
- Playing the Assassin, first produced by InterAct Theatre Company as "Assassin" and by Penguin Rep as "Playing the Assassin"
- Priceless, first developed and produced by Penguin Rep
- Blues in My Soul: The Legend and Legacy of Lonnie Johnson, first developed and produced by City Theater Company and Passage Theatre Company
- After Birth of a Nation, first developed and produced by City Theater Company
- Muleheaded: Zora and Langston Write a Play, first developed and produced by Passage Theatre Company
- Clay Warrior
- Birthright, published in Polish by Dialog magazine in Warsaw
- The Passion of M., developed by Blank Theatre Company
- Without Consent, developed by Penguin Rep, Delaware Theatre Company, and Theatre Exile
- Ball N’ Chain: Big Mama Thornton Plays Monterey
- Comfort and Joy
- Russian Roulette
- The Stronger (Adaptation), first produced by Idiopathic Ridiculopathy Consortium
- Hammer of God
- The Maids (Adaptation), commissioned by Idiopathic Ridiculopathy Consortium
- Drummer: The Darkness and Genius of Jim Gordon
- Freud und Freud, developed by Delaware Theatre Company

=== Books (selected) ===
- The Black Arts Movement, Lucent Books. ISBN 9781420500530. (2008)
- The Kennedy Assassination, Reference Point Press. ISBN 9781601520364. (2008)
- Auschwitz, Lucent Books. ISBN 9781420501315. (2009)
- Racism, Lucent Books. ISBN 978-1420502282. (2010)
- The Israeli/Palestinian Conflict, Lucent Books. ISBN 978-1420502398. (2010)
- The Murder of Emmett Till, Lucent Books. ISBN 978-1420502138. (2010)
- Encounters with Vampires, Reference Point Press. ISBN 978-1601521330. (2010)
- The Decade of the 2000s, Reference Point Press. ISBN 978-1601522467. (2011)
- Colonial America, Reference Point Press. ISBN 978-1601522467. (2012)
- The Internment of Japanese Americans, Reference Point Press. ISBN 978-1601525925. (2013)
- Shakespeare’s Globe Theater, Reference Point Press. ISBN 978-1601525420. (2013)

== Awards and honors ==
- Pushcart Prize, Nomination (1995)
- Individual Artist Fellowship, Delaware Division of the Arts (1999)
- Barrymore Award, Nomination (2001)
- Julie Harris Playwriting Award, Finalist (2006)
- Individual Artist Fellowship, Delaware Division of the Arts (2006)
- Harriett Lake Festival of New Plays, Finalist (2007)
- Short and Sweet Festival, Featured Play (2007)
- Lincoln Boyhood Drama Association, Finalist (2007)
- Artist Opportunity Grant, Delaware Division of the Arts (2007)
- Harriett Lake Festival of New Plays, Finalist (2010)
- Hotel Obligado Audience Choice Award for New Work (2010)
- Artist Opportunity Grant, Delaware Division of the Arts (2010)
- Philadelphia Theater Critics’ Awards, Best Play Nomination (2013)
- Pulitzer Prize in Drama, Nomination (2014)
- Philadelphia Geek Award, White Mountains Project, Winner: Someone Else’s Life" (2015)
- Best Delaware Playwright, Broadway World Awards (2017)
- Artist Opportunity Grant, Delaware Division of the Arts (2022)
- Artist Opportunity Grant, Delaware Division of the Arts (2025)

== Critical reviews ==
The New York Times praised Playing the Assassin, writing: ‘Football executives, fans, coaches, and players at all levels would be well-advised to see — and ponder — David Robson’s Playing the Assassin. Its compelling dialogue and forceful characters provide significant theatrical energy, delivering a gripping story while offering a pointed critique of professional football.’

“A brutal gridiron drama...a thrilling production...will appeal to theatergoers who never watch football as much as die-hard fans who can now glimpse their game treated with understanding and depth.”—The Philadelphia Inquirer on Playing the Assassin.

"A quasi-historical farce loaded with sight gags, cross-dressing, snappy dialog and larger-than-life characters. The plot amusingly weaves from policy talk to social issues to religion to the arts...The wacky first act sets up a screwball second...After Birth of a Nation is a funny look at what might have happened in 1915, but many of the jokes and comical references are topical. Robson has crafted his historical farce for today’s audiences."—Delaware Arts Info on After Birth of a Nation.

"There is a scene in which Lonnie and Chris both play guitar. Before launching into a song, they try to get their instruments in tune with each other. It is a beautiful segment because it encapsulates the spirit of Blues in My Soul. Before they can collaborate to make music happen, they must — literally and metaphorically — find a way to get in tune with each other. The result is a riveting piece of theater."—Town Topics on Blues in My Soul.

“Tightly written, sometimes tense, and generally commanding work...It sure is good theater.”—The Philadelphia Inquirer on Playing Leni.

“A Few Small Repairs creates, in tiny increments, both admiration and pathos for Little Alice, this peculiar, hairless, middle-aged daughter who, with her `low threshold for guilt' finds her life has vanished in devotion to her demented mother. A charming and moving play. It lingers vividly in the mind because it created characters of subtlety and humanness, each of whom was a real individual. "—The Philadelphia Inquirer on A Few Small Repairs.
