= Uczeń Polski =

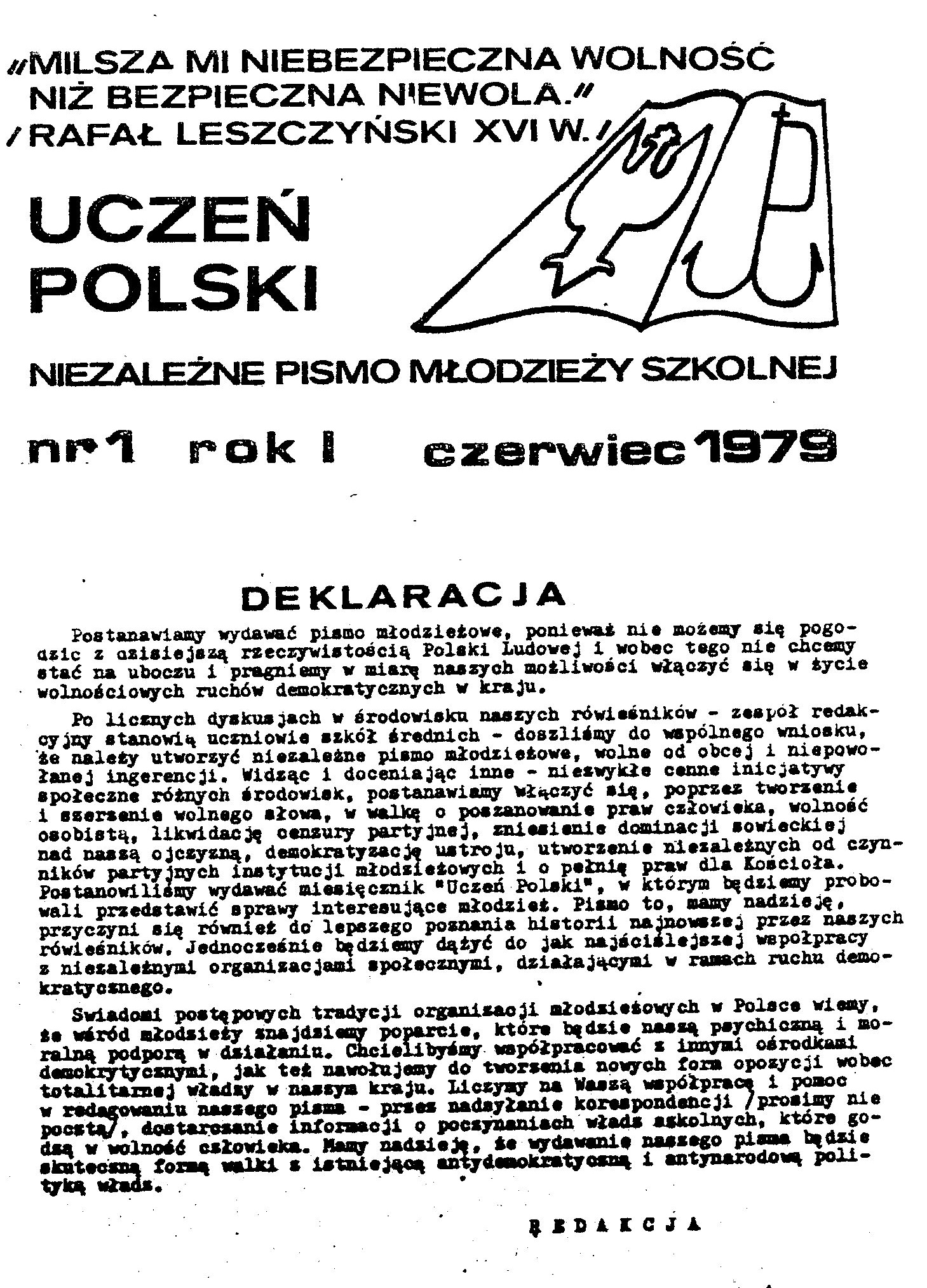
- Title page of the first edition of Uczeń Polski
- Frequency: Monthly
- Publisher: Andrzej Czuma
- Founded: 1978
- First issue: June 1979
- Final issue: 1989
- Company: Independent Students' Association
- Country: Polish People's Republic
- Based in: Warsaw
- Language: Polish
- OCLC: 717004918

Uczeń Polski (Polish pronunciation: [ˈu.t͡ʂɛɲ ˈpɔl.ski], Polish Pupil) was an independent monthly magazine addressed to Polish schools and published between June 1979 and December 1981, from 1982 to 1984, and 1988 to 1989. It had the widest circulation amongst any independent publications addressed to schools and one of the largest compared with other independent magazines published in late 1970s Poland.

== Editorial team and history ==
The magazine was created by a group of secondary school pupils from Warsaw in the autumn of 1978 (Wojciech Ciszewski, Wojciech Dutkiewicz, Piotr Kapuściński, Zbigniew Karaczun, Tomasz Mickiewicz, Piotr Rogóyski) associated with the Movement for Defense of Human and Civic Rights (ROPCiO). Maciej Igielski and Tomasz Sokolewicz joined in the autumn of 1980. Since July 1981, the magazine became affiliated with the National Commission of the Independent Student Union (NZS) and since October 1981, it became an official magazine of the Federation of School Youth (FMS). Until December 1981, the editors had been meeting at Tomasz Mickiewicz's home; however, the official address provided by the magazine was that of Andrzej Czuma, ROPCiO's spokesman. The first several issues were printed by the clandestine offset printing shop of Young Poland (Młoda Polska), and then by ROPCiO printers in Lublin and Warsaw. Between May 1980 and April 1981, the magazine was printed using the silk-screen method in Piotr Rogóyski's apartment in Warsaw. Between April 1981 and November 1981, the magazine was printed in the offset printing shop of the then-legal "Solidarity" in Kalisz. After the introduction of martial law (13 December 1981), and Tomasz Sokolewicz's arrest, the editing of Uczeń Polski was taken over by Krzysztof Czuma in cooperation with Maciej Kulesza and Irena Szymczak. The second editorial team published the magazine until 1984. The magazine was printed on a duplicator hidden near the house of Maciej Kulesza. Between 1988 and 1989 three more issues were published by Jarosław Włodarczyk, Piotr Suffczynski, Piotr Kraśko and Wawrzyniec Rymkiewicz.

== Contents ==
Since the beginning, Uczeń Polski was associated with the Movement for Defense of Human and Civic Rights. Its motto stated "We love unsafe freedom more than safe slavery", taken from a 16th-century Polish nobleman, Rafał Leszczyński. The magazine discussed school life under the communist system, corrected official and biased history textbooks and presented comments on the current political and social issues. In the 1981 secret instruction on fighting with the democratic opposition by the Public Prosecutor Czubiński, Uczeń Polski was named as one of the most dangerous independent publications. Its circulation was one of the widest amongst the independent democratic magazines in Poland in the late 1970s.

== See also ==
- List of magazines in Poland
