= Penguin Rep =

Nonprofit theater company in Stony Point, New York, United States

Coordinates: 41.23263°N 73.99423°W

Penguin Rep is a nonprofit theater company in Stony Point, New York, United States, now in its 42nd season. Penguin Rep, dubbed "the gutsiest little theatre" by The New York Times, was founded by Joe Brancato, artistic director, with the aim of adding a new kind of theatre to the local cultural landscape: a professional enterprise dedicated to promoting new voices and works which enrich the body of American drama; nurturing and developing new talent for the stage; and reaching new audiences for theatre.

== History and operations ==
Under the leadership of Brancato, cited by The New York Times as "one of America's insightful young directors", and executive director Andrew M. Horn, the company has attracted more than 150,000 audience members from the lower Hudson Valley and beyond to its intimate 108-seat theatre.

Penguin Rep has presented more than 100 critically and popularly acclaimed productions, including premieres by playwrights, including Warren Leight (author of Side Man), Arthur Laurents (West Side Story), Elizabeth Swados (Runaways), William Mastrosimone (Extremities), and Ronald Harwood (Taking Sides).

=== Past successes ===
From Door to Door by James Sherman, which opened Off Broadway at the Westside Arts Theatre.
Cobb by Lee Blessing, which won The Drama Desk Award, produced Off Broadway and in Los Angeles by Kevin Spacey.
Glimmer, Glimmer and Shine, by Tony Award–winner Warren Leight. Produced at Manhattan Theatre Club and at Mark Taper Forum.
2½ Jews by Alan Brandt, produced nationwide at dozens of theatres.
The Marriage Fool by Richard Vetere. Seen as a television movie starring Carol Burnett and Walter Matthau.
One Shot, One Kill by Richard Vetere, produced Off Broadway at Primary Stages.
The Man Who Was Peter Pan by Allan Knee, commission by Penguin Executive Director Andrew Horn and adapted to the screen as Finding Neverland starring Johnny Depp.
The Devil's Music: The Life and Blues of Bessie Smith by Angelo Parra, which moved to The Hartford Stage, Florida Stage, Cape Playhouse, and George Street Playhouse, among other prestigious venues, and will begin touring the country in 2010.
Playing the Assassin by David Robson, which moved to TheaterWorks Hartford and Delaware Theatre Company.

== See also ==
- List of theatres in New York (state)
