= Tygodnik Angora =

Tygodnik Angora (commonly known as Angora) is a Polish language weekly press review published in Łódź.

== History ==
The magazine was established in 1990. It is distributed in Warsaw, Dortmund, Chicago, Toronto and New York. In addition, the weekly also covers editorial columns. The magazine is published by Wydawnictwo Westa Druk Mirosław Kuliś.

In 2010 the circulation of Tygodnik Angora was 469,675 copies.

== See also ==
- List of magazines in Poland
