= Hanna Bakuła =

Polish painter

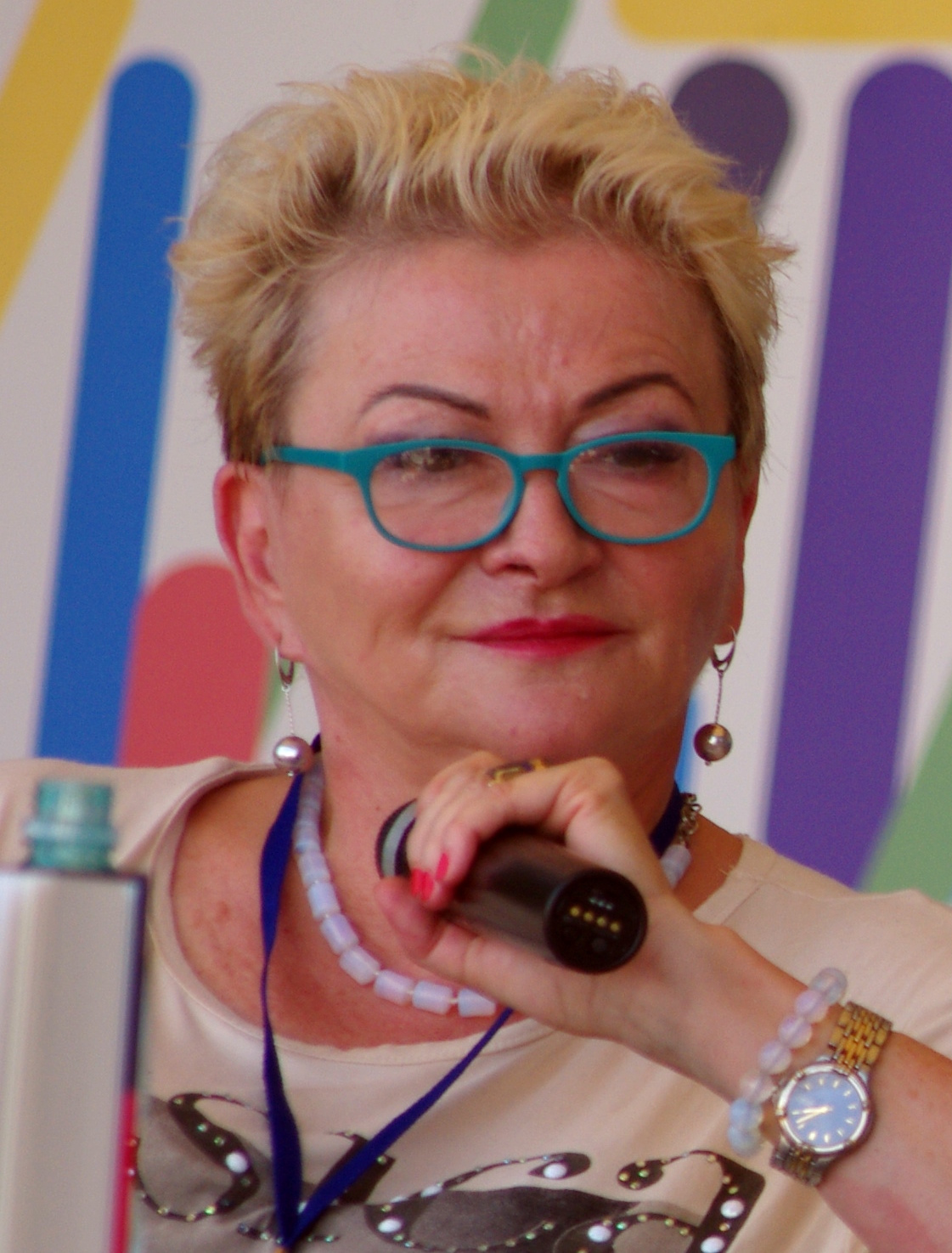
- Hanna Bakuła at Nadmorski Plener Czytelniczy in Gdynia, 2014
- Born: 30 March 1950 (age 75); Warsaw, Poland
- Occupation: Painter

Hanna Bakuła (born 30 March 1950) is a Polish painter, scenographer and Playboy columnist.

== Biography ==
Bakuła has graduated with honors from the Academy of Fine Arts in Warsaw, where she has studied under such Polish masters as J. Tarasin, E. Eibisch, A. Kobzdej. In 1981 she left for New York City and settled on Manhattan. She painted, designed scenography and costumes for the avant-garde theatre "The Kitchen". These designs were praised by "The New York Times" as the best of the Off Broadway projects and won the first prize.

In 1989 she came back to Poland. Since 1996 years Bakuła organizes Franz Schubert's Music Festivals. In 1997 she has established the Hanna Bakuła Foundation and later, the Women's Club.

Hanna Bakuła is an author of many portraits, including Grace Jones, Liv Ullmann, Yehudi Menuhin.

She is an atheist. Hanna Bakuła lives in Warsaw.
