= Archivolta =

Magazine

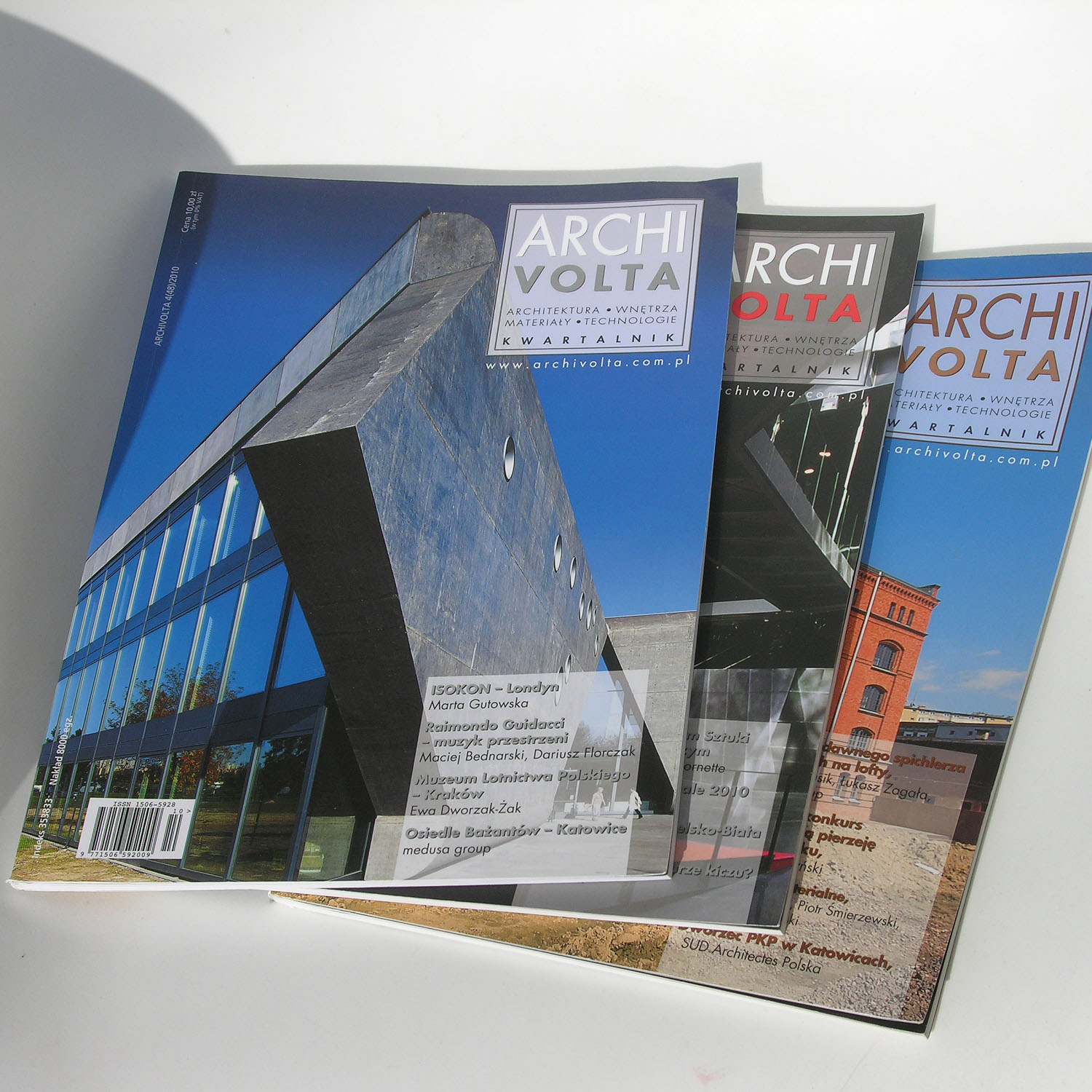
Archivolta

Archivolta is the Polish professional journal for architecture and construction produced by Wydawnictwo Archivolta publishers in Kraków.

== Overview ==
Archivolta first appeared in 1999. The magazine is a Polish professional journal for architects, construction engineers, conservation officers, building authorities and developers.

The magazine is aimed at professional architects and other design professionals and enthusiasts with news, design, building technology, design tools, environment, and building culture sections.

Archivolta is published on a quarterly basis.
