= Erin Dagon-Mitchell =

American dramatist

Erin Dagon Mitchell
- Born: September 28, 1965 (age 60); Princeton, New Jersey, U.S. (United States)
- Spouse: P. Shane Mitchell (1997 - )

Erin Dagon-Mitchell (born September 28, 1965) is an actress, director, and playwright from Anchorage, Alaska.

She was born in Princeton, New Jersey before moving to Anchorage in 1976.

== Awards and nominations ==
After graduating magna cum laude with a Masters in Theatre and Communications from Wichita State University (WSU), she lectured for the Department of Theatre at WSU as well as acted, directed and taught around the country for the Wichita Children's Theatre, Wichita Summer Rep, Bend Theatre for Young People, Kokopelli Productions, and the University of Alaska Anchorage.

== Directing credits ==
Mrs. Mitchell has directed over 40 plays including critically acclaimed productions of Into The Woods, Blithe Spirit, Dracula, Bat Boy: The Musical, Cotton Patch Gospel, The Big Slam, Much Ado About Nothing, and Between Daylight and Boonville. Her production of Should Old Acquaintance was selected as a special performance for the Kansas City American College Theatre Festival.

== Acting credits ==
As an actress she has performed the works of Edward Albee, Tony Kushner and John Guare for those Pulitzer Prize winning playwrights. Favored roles include Kate Keller in The Miracle Worker, Nora Flood in The Dark at the Top of the Stairs, Titania and Puck in A Midsummer Night's Dream, Frenchy in Grease and the title role in The Witch of Greythorn.

In May 2008, Dagon debuted the role of the evil witch in a newly penned musical version of Hansel and Gretel, a collaboration between her husband and Anchorage composer/lyricist Dennis Cleary.

== Playwriting credits ==
As a playwright her collaborative work Jolly Roger; King of the Pirates was published by Pioneer Drama Services and her short work Theodore Goodman was produced in the 2nd annual Don't Blink play festival.

Mrs. Mitchell is one of the founding directors of TBA Theatre Company in Anchorage, Alaska.
