= Focus (Polish magazine) =

Polish popular science magazine

- Editor: Łukasz Załuski
- Categories: popular science
- Frequency: monthly
- Format: A4
- Circulation: 98 thousand copies
- Publisher: Burda International Polska
- First issue: September 1995
- Final issue: February 2022 (print)
- Country: Poland
- Based in: Warsaw
- Language: Polish
- Website: http://www.focus.pl
- ISSN: 1234-9992

Focus is a Polish popular science monthly magazine which was a print publication between 1995 and 2022. It became online-only publication from February 2022.

== History and profile ==
Focus was first published in September 1995 by Gruner and Jahr Polska and then was owned by Burda Media Polska. The magazine has its headquarters in Warsaw.

It features stories on health, coaching, space exploration, technology, nature, society and history and produces a number of podcasts ran by the members of the editorial team.

== See also ==
- List of magazines in Poland
