= Podróże (magazine) =

Polish travel magazine

- Categories: Travel magazine
- Frequency: Monthly
- Publisher: TIME SA
- Founded: 1998
- Company: Grupa ZPR Media
- Country: Poland
- Based in: Warsaw
- Language: Polish
- Website: https://podroze.se.pl/
- ISSN: 1505-3601
- OCLC: 68761859

Podróże is a monthly magazine published in Warsaw, Poland, since 1998. The magazine presents travel tips and geographical information. It is one of the largest travel magazines in Poland.

== History and profile ==
Podróże was launched in 1998. The publisher of the magazine is TIME SA, a Polish media group. The company is part of Grupa ZPR Media. It was first published on a bimonthly basis and then, on a monthly basis. The headquarters of the magazine is in Warsaw. Filip Niedenthal is one of the former editors-in-chief of the magazine, who served in the post between 2008 and 2012.

In December 2017, Podróże had an average circulation of 19,600 copies.
