= Jedność (Polish weekly) =

Independent Polish weekly magazine

Jedność (Polish pronunciation: [ˈjɛd.nɔɕt͡ɕ], meaning Unity in English) was an independent Polish weekly magazine launched during the August 1980 strike in Szczecin Shipyard. Four months later it became the first opposition publication in the Soviet-dominated Eastern Europe to be allowed by the authorities.

== History ==
In the Communist countries, all publications needed a government license, in Poland called debit, and were subject to prior restraint. The rise of Solidarność created a kind of grey zone: hundreds of local bulletins were launched without "debits", thus formally illegal, yet rarely prosecuted. Jedność (full title: Nasz rodowód – sierpień ’80 JEDNOŚĆ, Our origin - August 1980 UNITY) was initially published and distributed in the Szczecin region in this way.

Unlike others, Jedność chief editor Leszek Dlouchy applied for a debit and surprisingly received it soon, with the first fully legal edition published on 3 January 1981. The countrywide Tygodnik Solidarność, the official weekly of the free union's National Coordination Committee, had to wait until May for its "debit".

Both papers struggled with the censors who would often ban half of a planned issue, and a sequence of dashes in square brackets, [----], marking the cuts, was often seen in each article. Yet the debit spelled the right of sale in kiosks of the monopolist, state-owned Ruch, while underground and grey zone bulletins could only be distributed hand-to-hand.

Out of 100,000 Jedność copies printed weekly, half was meant for Szczecin and the region, while union members in the national railway PKP would distribute the other half to several Polish cities. Jedność attracted several prominent Polish authors and illustrators, the most notable being Andrzej Mleczko.

The legal existence of both Jedność and Tygodnik Solidarność ended on 13 December 1981, when the Communists declared martial law in Poland. Jedność continued in the underground until the fall of Communism in 1989.
