= Scott McMorrow =

American playwright and actor

Scott McMorrow is an American playwright and actor. McMorrow's plays have been translated into Italian, and they have been produced extensively throughout the United States, including Off-Off Broadway. His award-winning plays and poetry have been widely anthologized, and McMorrow has published multiple books in the field of primary education. He earned a Bachelor of Science in civil engineering from the University of Massachusetts Amherst, and an MFA in creative writing from San Francisco State University.

Awards

- Calling Long Distance, Winner, Ivey Awards Play Competition
- Leftovers, Winner, Chameleon Theatre Circle’s New Play Contest
- Turtle Shopping, Silver Stage Award, New Voice Play Festival
- Turtle Shopping, Third Place, Havemeyer Playwright Competition
- Fishing the Moon, Semifinalist, Beverly Hills Theatre Guild Julie Harris Competition
- Future Sex, Second Place, Jim Highsmith Playwright Competition
