= Woch =

Woch is a Polish surname derived from the diminutive form of any of the names starting with Wo-: Wojciech, Wolimir, etc. Notable people with the surname include:

- Dawid Woch, Polish volleyball player
- Marek Woch, Polish politician
- Stan Woch, American comics artist
