= TheaterWorks (Hartford) =

TheaterWorks Hartford City Arts on Pearl
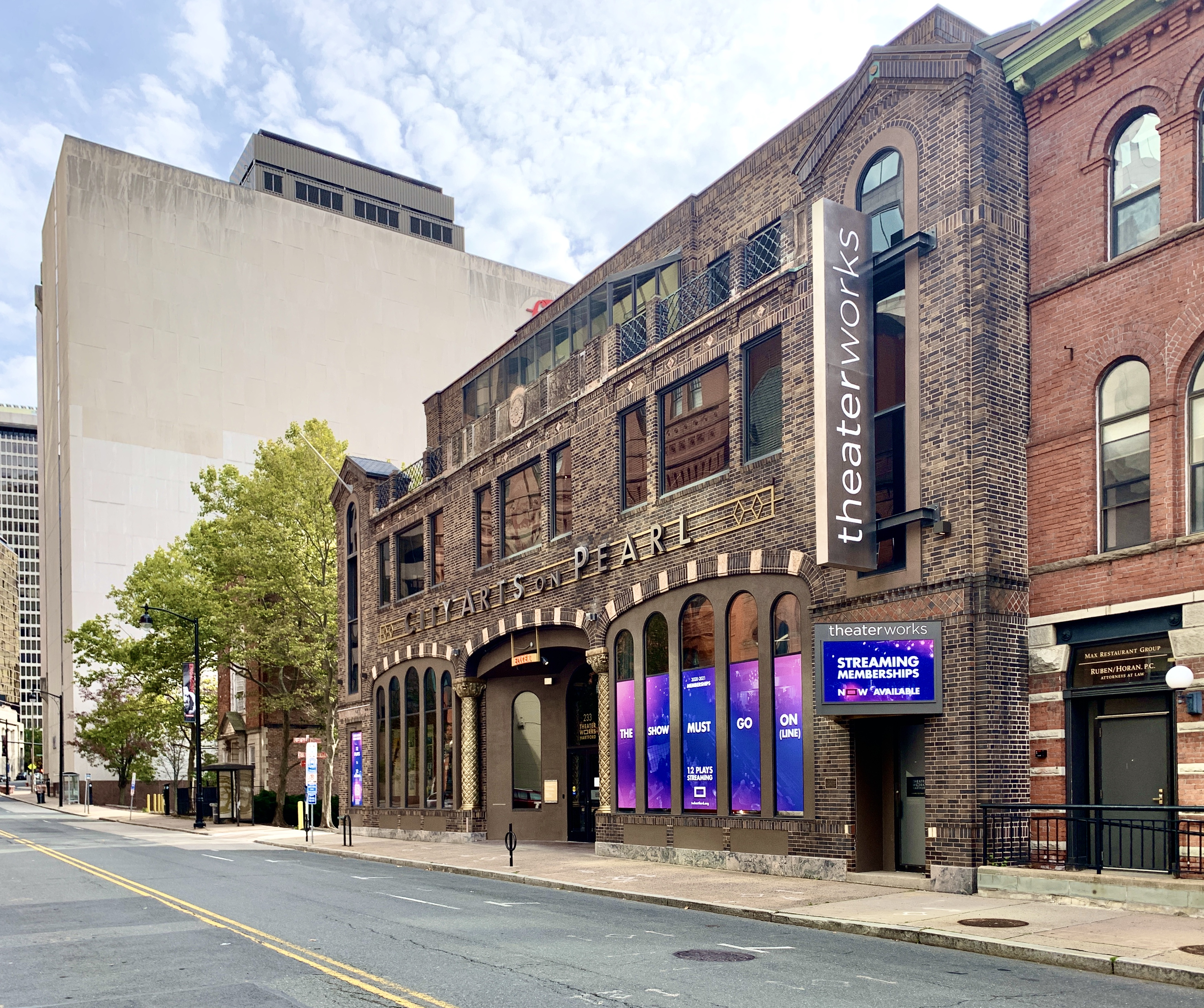
- Interactive map of TheaterWorks Hartford; City Arts on Pearl
- Address: 233 Pearl Street; Hartford, Connecticut; United States
- Coordinates: 41.7664°N 72.6774°W
- Owner: TheaterWorks
- Capacity: 195
- Type: Regional theatre

Construction
- Built: 1927

Website
- www.twhartford.org

TheaterWorks Hartford is a non-profit, professional theater company situated on Pearl Street in downtown Hartford, Connecticut. The company was founded in 1985 by Steve Campo and is currently run by Rob Ruggiero who serves as Producing Artistic Director. Since its founding in 1985, TheaterWorks Hartford has produced over 130 plays and presents approximately 225 performances per season. On average, TheaterWorks Hartford’s annual audience tops 40,000 of which more than 5,000 are subscribers.

== Notable Productions ==
In their 1986-1987 season, TheaterWorks Hartford produced Edward Albee's Who's Afraid of Virginia Woolf? Albee and Campo, being friends, frequently collaborated, and in 2004 TheaterWorks Hartford produced another of Albee's plays, The Goat or Who is Sylvia?

In 2008, TheaterWorks Hartford produced David Harrower's play Blackbird, which the Berkshire Eagle praised as "carefully calibrated, yet nonetheless riveting." In the same year, Jeremy Jordan and Chad Allen starred in The Little Dog Laughed, directed by Rob Ruggiero. The year before, but in the same season, Campo directed Doubt: A Parable.

TheaterWorks Hartford produced the John Cariani play Almost, Maine in 2013, a production called "Lovely, witty," by the New York Times, and the next year produced Love/Sick by the same playwright.

In 2015, TheaterWorks Hartford produced the David Robson drama Playing the Assassin, which the New Haven Review described as "expert and compelling theater that deserves to be experienced more than once."

In 2017, TheaterWorks Hartford produced the rock musical hit Next to Normal under the direction of Rob Ruggiero. The show originally ran from March 24 through April 30 before extending through May 14 of the same year in light of its great success. The show starred Christiane Noll as Diana Goodman, alongside David Harris as Dan Goodman. The cast also included Maya Keleher, John Cardoza, J.D. Daw, and Nick Sacks. The production garnered 10 nominations for the 2017 Connecticut Critic Circle Choice Awards, and won the awards for Outstanding Production of a Musical, Outstanding Actress in a Musical (Noll), Outstanding Director of a Musical, Outstanding Lighting, and Outstanding Debut (Keleher).

Joseph Harrison of BroadwayWorld wrote that the production "goes beyond entertainment, reaching in and touching you to your very core in a brilliant symphony of emotional energy." The Hartford Courant praised the show for "being done with such careful thought and expressive detail in such an intimate environment raises this already confrontational musical to a different level of emotional intensity" and praised Noll for being "a fearless performer [who] can switch from indomitability to vulnerability in a split second."

== Building ==
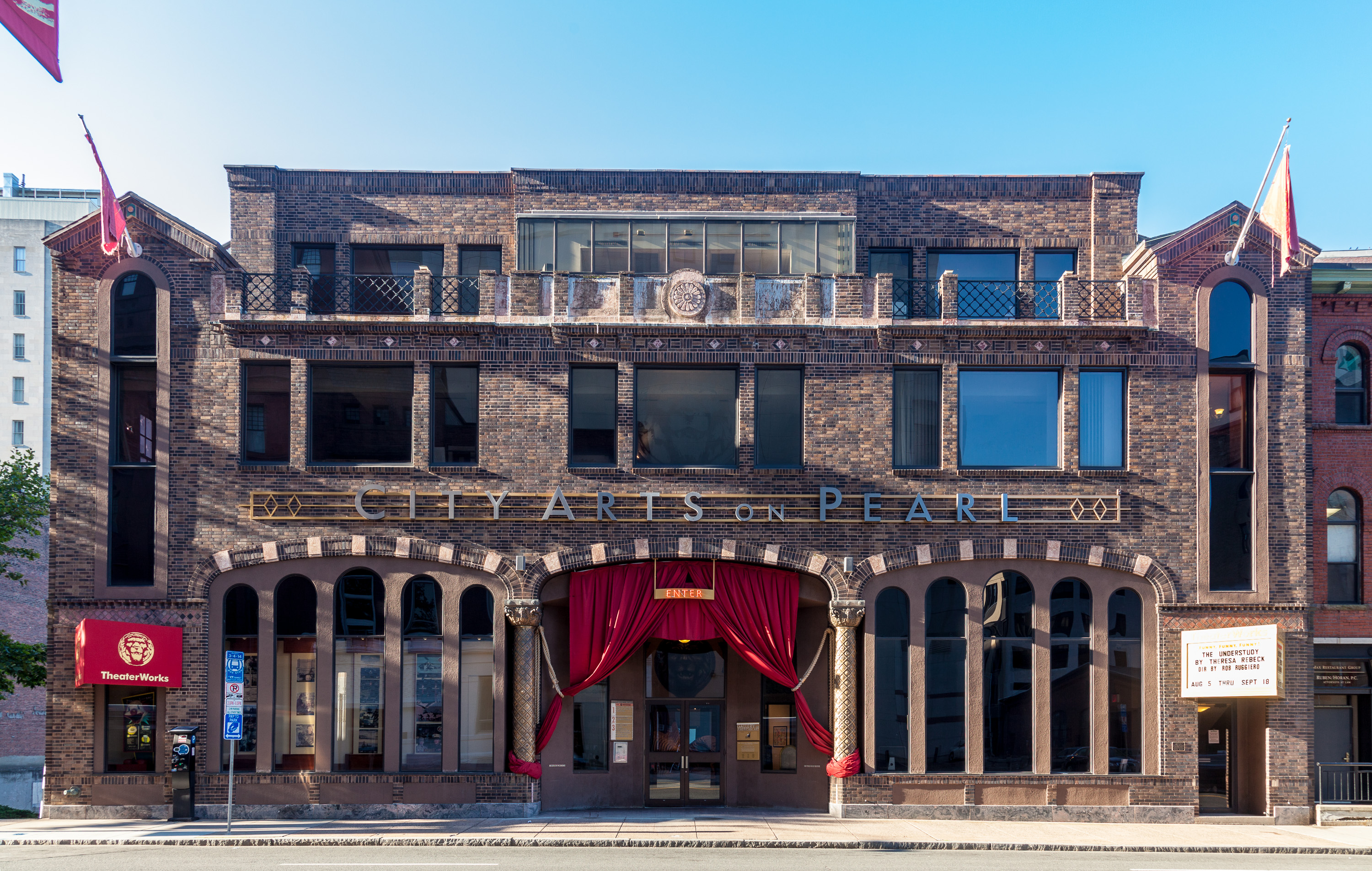
Pearl Street Facade

The historic Art Deco Building at 233 Pearl Street was built in 1927. TheaterWorks operated in the building in the 1980s, finally purchasing it outright in 1993. In 2008, the building was renamed City Arts on Pearl. TheaterWorks converted the building into an arts center, now home to numerous nonprofit organizations as well as performance, gallery, office, rehearsal, and storage spaces. The theater itself is in the basement of the building and is a small intimate space. It seats 195 people and is only 8 rows back in any direction. The large, brick building is in Art Deco style with decorative Moorish Revival touches.
