= Kaliszer Woch =

- Editor: Jakub Jarecki
- Categories: Political and economy magazine
- Frequency: Weekly
- Founded: 12 April 1930
- Final issue: 1939
- Country: Poland
- Based in: Kalisz
- Language: Yiddish

Kaliszer Woch (pol. Week Kaliski) - was a Jewish weekly social, political and economic magazine in the years 1930 - 1939 in Kalisz. The weekly published the news by some foreign correspondents like the other weekly Yiddish magazine Kaliszer Lebn.
