= Book Institute =

Polish national cultural institution

- Instytut Książki
- Headquarters of the Institute in Kleparz, Kraków
- Formation: 2004; 22 years ago
- Type: Cultural institution
- Location: Kleparz, Stare Miasto, Kraków, Poland
- Coordinates: 50°04′10.8″N 19°56′22.3″E
- Official languages: Polish, English
- Director: Grzegorz Jankowicz
- Website: instytutksiazki.pl

The Book Institute (Polish: Instytut Książki) is a Polish national cultural institution that was opened on 11 January 2004 in Kraków, Poland.

== History ==
The establishment of the Book Institute was initiated by the Minister of Culture, Waldemar Dąbrowski. The institution includes Polish literature. At the time of its inauguration, the Book Institute operated in the Villa Decius, and after renovation, it moved to the building at 1 Szczepańska Street.

On 1 April 2010, the Book Institute took over the publishing of magazines under the patronage of the Ministry of Culture and National Heritage.

Since 2005, the Book Institute has funded the Transatlantyk award in the amount of €10,000, awarded to ambassadors of Polish literature abroad. The award was presented for the first time during the Congress of Translators of Polish Literature in Kraków in 2005.

In 2015, it moved to a historic building purchased from Radio Kraków at 6 Wróblewskiego Street.

== Controversy ==
Following the 2015 parliamentary elections in Poland, the Book Institute underwent significant leadership changes. In April 2016, Minister of Culture Piotr Gliński dismissed the Institute’s director Grzegorz Gauden and appointed Dariusz Jaworski as his successor. Jaworski’s appointment was widely interpreted within literary circles as part of a broader political shift affecting national cultural institutions after the change of government.

Shortly after taking up the post, Jaworski became the subject of criticism from writers and cultural commentators, who argued that the Institute’s work was increasingly shaped by political considerations. In September 2016, he was questioned by the Senate Committee on Culture and Media, whose members voiced reservations about the ideological direction of the Institute’s programmes. At the same meeting, a statement by poet and essayist Adam Zagajewski was presented, expressing opposition to Gauden’s removal and cautioning against favouring literature aligned with current political messaging in the Institute’s activities.

Criticism also focused on changes to the Institute’s public events and international outreach. In 2016, the Book Institute organised literary discussions at the OFF Festival in Katowice that concentrated on themes such as Poland’s Christianisation, the so-called "cursed soldiers", and surveillance under the communist regime, with panels led by conservative commentators. Media reports noted low attendance at these events.

In 2016 and 2017, a number of experienced employees departed from the Institute, among them senior program staff and members of the communications team. Critics, including former employees and outside observers, characterised these departures as leading to a weakening of institutional knowledge and professional independence, contending that decision-making became increasingly concentrated at the level of the director. Those who left included figures closely involved in major initiatives such as the "Dyskusyjne Kluby Książki" (Book Discussion Clubs), a program previously regarded as one of the Institute’s most successful undertakings.

Additional criticism focused on the Institute’s activities abroad. Appearances by Book Institute delegates at the 2016 London Book Fair were described by literary agents and publishing professionals as lacking professionalism and as harmful to Poland’s standing in the international publishing sector. According to these commentators, the presentations risked eroding trust built over many years between representatives of Polish literature and foreign publishers.

By the early 2020s, parts of the Polish literary community either distanced themselves from the Book Institute or ceased cooperation altogether, organising initiatives independently of the institution. In early 2023, controversy resurfaced when the Institute appointed a new editor-in-chief of the literary monthly Dialog without consultation with its editorial staff, prompting the editorial team to publish an independent version of the journal.

Jaworski concluded his tenure as director of the Book Institute on 3 April 2024, after eight years in office. In a farewell statement, he defended the Institute’s record during his leadership and rejected what he described as misleading media and political criticism, while also expressing concern about the planned merger of the Book Institute with the Institute of Literature.

== Directors ==
- Andrzej Nowakowski (2004–2005)
- Magdalena Ślusarska (2005–2008)
- Grzegorz Gauden (2008–2016)
- Dariusz Jaworski (2016–2024)
- Robert Kaźmierczak (acting, 2024)
- Grzegorz Jankowicz (2024–present)
