= Andrzej Lepper =

Polish politician (1954–2011)

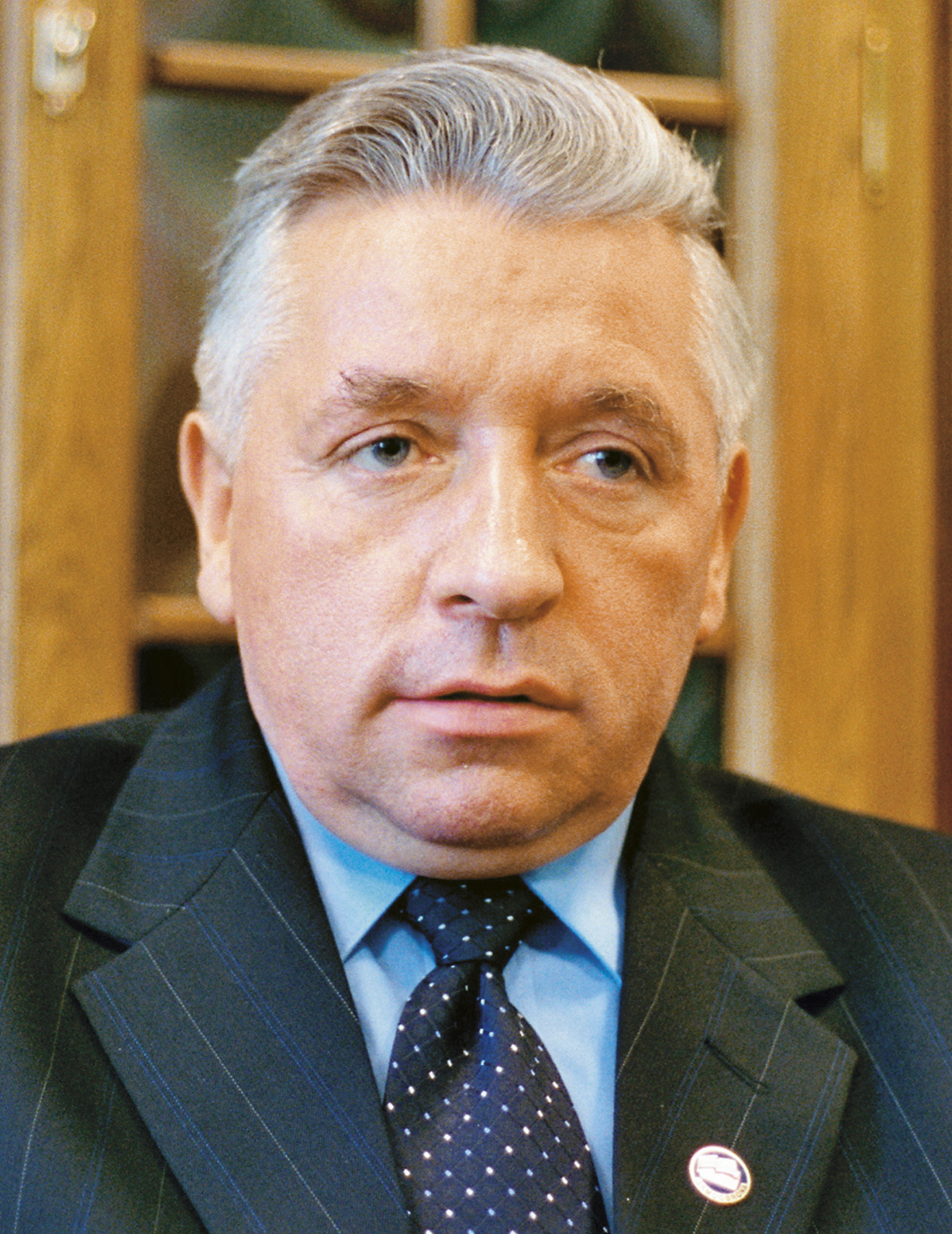

Deputy Prime Minister of Poland
- In office 5 May 2006 – 22 September 2006
- Prime Minister: Kazimierz Marcinkiewicz; Jarosław Kaczyński
- Preceded by: Zyta Gilowska
- Succeeded by: Ludwik Dorn
- In office 16 October 2006 – 9 July 2007
- Prime Minister: Jarosław Kaczyński
- Preceded by: Ludwik Dorn
- Succeeded by: Przemysław Gosiewski

Minister of Agriculture
- In office 5 May 2006 – 22 September 2006
- Prime Minister: Kazimierz Marcinkiewicz; Jarosław Kaczyński
- Preceded by: Krzysztof Jurgiel
- Succeeded by: Jarosław Kaczyński (acting)
- In office 16 October 2006 – 9 July 2007
- Prime Minister: Jarosław Kaczyński
- Preceded by: Jarosław Kaczyński (acting)
- Succeeded by: Wojciech Mojzesowicz

Deputy Marshal of the Sejm
- In office 26 October 2005 – 9 May 2006
- Preceded by: Marek Borowski
- Succeeded by: Genowefa Wiśniowska

Personal details
- Born: Andrzej Zbigniew Lepper; 13 June 1954 Stowięcino, Poland
- Died: 5 August 2011 (aged 57) Warsaw, Poland
- Party: Self-Defence of the Republic
- Other political affiliations: Polish United Workers' Party (1978-1980)

Andrzej Zbigniew Lepper (Note: Polish pronunciation: [ˈandʐɛj ˈzbiɡɲɛf ˈlɛppɛr]) (13 June 1954 – 5 August 2011) was a Polish politician, farmer, and trade unionist who led the Self-Defence of the Republic of Poland, an agrarian populist party that, between 2005 and 2007, was the third-largest political party in Poland; in 2006, he briefly formed a coalition government alongside the ruling Law and Justice party, serving in the roles of Deputy Prime Minister and Minister of Agriculture. He also served as Deputy Marshal of the Sejm in 2001 and from 2005 to 2006.

Considered a far-leftist, Lepper was heavily critical of capitalism and heavily integrated Catholic social teaching into his rhetoric; he thought positively of the Polish People's Republic. He led numerous farmers' protests; his supporters were known to frequently block roads. First rising to political notability in the early 1990s following his establishment of Self-Defence in 1992, he was elected to first political office, a seat in the West Pomeranian Voivodeship Sejmik, in 1998, being elected to the Sejm in 2001 and later removed from office in 2007. During this time, he ran for the office of President four times, in 1995, 2000, 2005 and 2010.

After he was unelected, Lepper lost much of his political prominence and fell into large debts, ultimately being found hanged in his office in 2011. Although it was ruled a suicide, it has been speculated to be a murder, although there is no common agreement regarding a perpetrator. During and after his career, he was compared to figures such as Hugo Chávez and Evo Morales.

== Early life ==
Lepper was born in Stowięcino, a tiny hamlet of roughly 200 people. Formerly a thriving community, it became a place of socio-cultural impoverishment and economic struggle since Poland's transformation into a market-based economy. During this transition period his farm, like most small businesses in Poland, found itself on the verge of bankruptcy but survived.

A farmer by trade, Lepper completed all coursework required at the State Agricultural Technical School in Sypniewo, yet did not undertake the final qualifying exam. He also had no formal higher education but was presented with several doctor honoris causa awards, including by the University of Kyiv (Ukraine) in recognition of his work, commitment and outreach.

Lepper was married and, together with his wife Irena, had three children.

== Political career ==
For two years (1978–1980), he was a member of the Polish United Workers' Party (PZPR), Poland's equivalent of a formal communist party during the Polish People's Republic (PRL; 1947–1989). In 1992 Lepper formed his own political party, an organisation of economically struggling farmers like himself, naming it Samoobrona (lit. 'self-defence'; SO).

The first time Lepper rose to a position of political leadership was in the summer of 1991, when he organised and led a farmer protest movement against the disastrous economic conditions in Polish agriculture and lack of state assistance to those impoverished by the ongoing capitalist transition. Already back then, Lepper was considering proposing an alternative economic system to the capitalist one. The voivodeships of Zamość and Koszalin became important centres of mobilisations around the issue of rural poverty and over-indebtedness. In Zamość, a protest committee was founded on 10 July, while on 27 July, the first iteration of Samoobrona, the Communal Agricultural Self-Defence Committee (Polish: Gminny Komitet Samoobrony Rolnictwa), was founded in Lepper's home village of Darłowo.

Rural protests quickly spread and attracted the attention and support of major rural trade unions, such as the Rural Solidarity. The regional president of Rural Solidarity in West Pomerania, Zbigniew Obrocki, coordinated protests together with the newly created movements and invited several representatives of the local protest committees in Zamość and Darłowo to join the Rural Solidarity's strike based on occupying the Sejm building on 5 October 1991. The representatives invited by Obrocki included Lepper, as a representative of the striking farmers of Darłowo. This action was considered very successful because of how much media coverage and support it gained, and soon divisions emerged between the representatives based on the protest methods. Rural Solidarity wanted to preserve their official and civil image by keeping to peaceful protests, while the group organised against Lepper insisted on more confrontational measures. As Gazeta Wyborcza reported on 11 October:

We came here [in front of Sejm] to discuss agricultural problems, not to demand anything. We don't want to organize a revolt, the peasants aren't going to demonstrate with pitchforks!", [Protest Committee leaders] told journalists at a press conference held yesterday [October 10, 1990]. Nevertheless, profound differences between the demonstrators became apparent at the press conference. Some of them, mainly from the Koszalin voivodeship (where a protest committee has been active since July), publicly stated that they did not believe in the effectiveness of these peaceful methods: "The government will only give in when there is bloodshed and dead bodies. The only solution is to show them our strength and invade the city". It was in an electric atmosphere that the press conference ended, without the protest committee being able to specify how long it will be prepared to wait for the government to enter into negotiations.

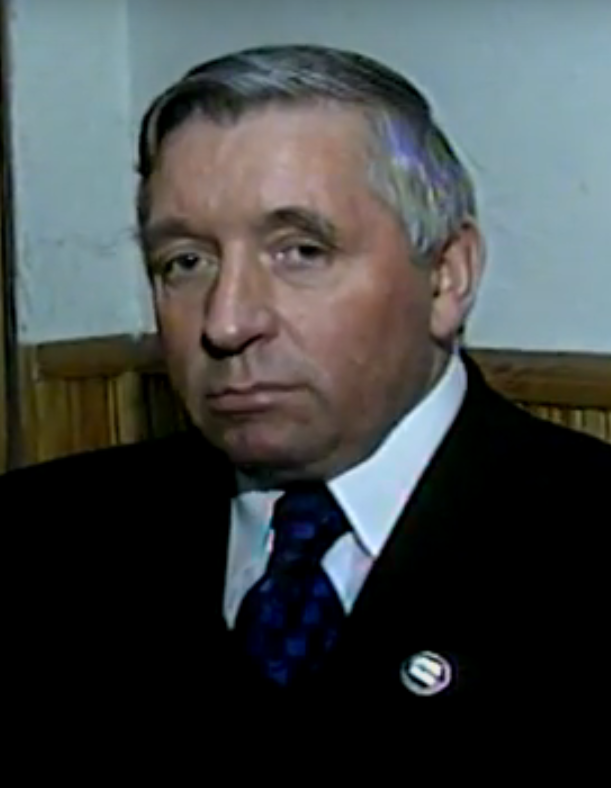
Lepper in 1999

This difference of opinion led to the formation of the National Committee for the Self-Defence of Agriculture (Polish: Krajowy Komitet Samoobrony Rolnictwa, KKSR), which was an informal formation with no official leadership but came to be dominated by Lepper. Open clashes with police that took place during the protests of KKSR gained much attention and made the group considered one of the main representatives of protesting farmers. Because of this, Lepper was invited to a meeting with Leszek Balcerowicz on 24 October. Balcerowicz was the Polish Deputy Prime Minister and Minister of Finance, whose name became synonymous with the neoliberal, monetarist and anti-social policies carried out in post-communist Poland. After a two-hour-long conversation, Lepper became convinced that the neoliberal reform pursued by Balcerowicz needed to be stopped at all costs.

As Lepper reported many years later, the idea to create a trade union and then a political movement was born after a meeting with Deputy Prime Minister Leszek Balcerowicz. Lepper said about the meeting: "Everything that happened afterwards – with me and Samoobrona – I therefore owe, to some extent, to that conversation of 10 years ago". Lepper's disdain towards Balcerowicz became a key element of his political rhetoric – in 2002, he described Balcerowicz as "the greatest pest, destroyer, traitor".

Lepper's Farmers' Self-Defence Committee first attempted to participate in the 1991 Polish parliamentary election on 27 October. The electoral law for the Sejm and Senate in force at the time allowed committees to register in only one electoral district. His run in the elections was unsuccessful, due – as Lepper claimed – also to his lack of direct participation in the campaign. The list of the Provincial Farmers' Self-Defence Committee opened by the group's leader received only 3247 votes in constituency number 21, covering the then Koszalin and Słupsk voivodeships.

While Lepper failed to win a seat, the fact he received over 3000 votes for his name was seen as a demonstration that he could mobilise local networks of farmers in his favour. Because of this, the Provincial Farmers' Self-Defence Committee, under which Lepper organised an electoral list together with other farmers, was not scrapped but instead transformed into a trade union and then a political party. According to Lepper, as late as in the summer of 1991, the farmer protest committees in Darłowo and Zamość that would form Samoobrona were not planning to become a trade union. However, the autumn hunger strike in Warsaw, as well as Lepper's electoral bid in the 1991 elections, made protesting farmers supportive of the idea.

On 6 November 1991, Lepper's group organised a hunger strike, which came to be considered "spectacular". According to Sciences Po, the Lepper's hunger strike "established a link between the visible suffering of the strikers and the cause they endorsed". In January 1992, the Trade Union of Agriculture 'Samoobrona' was registered. The political party, which initially appeared under the name Self-Defence Alliance, was instead registered on 12 June 1992. Its membership – apart from representatives of ZZR "Samoobrona" – also included activists from the Metalworkers' Trade Union and a Green faction headed by Jan Bryczkowski.

On 14 November 1991, an agreement was concluded between the protesters and the government, which provided for a halt to the bailiff executions threatening farmers and the establishment of a special Fund for Restructuring and Debt Relief of Agriculture. In November of the same year, an application was made to the court to register the Trade Union of Agriculture 'Self-Defence'. The ZZR 'Samoobrona' – which brings together farmers and people connected with agriculture – was registered on 10 January 1992. Subsequently, on 27 and 28 March 1992, the First National Congress of the union was held in Warsaw, with representatives of the PSL, the National Union of Farmers and the then Deputy Minister of Agriculture, P. Dąbrowski, among others, attending it as invited guests. Lepper was elected president of the trade union, and a decision was taken to tighten up the forms of protest, setting up, among other things, so-called 'anti-enforcement brigades', which were to deal with thwarting bailiff seizures on indebted farms. Leszek Józef Walkiewicz reported that the 'anti-enforcement brigades' of Samoobrona saved more than 1,000 farmers from eviction.

Led by Lepper, the trade unionists consistently demanded the implementation of agreements concerning indebted farmers. They also decided to assert their interests through legal means, applying to the Constitutional Court to examine the compliance of the current banking law allowing variable interest rates on loans. In the absence of appropriate government action, a 100-strong group of trade unionists occupied the Ministry of Agriculture building on 9 April. After a few days, the protesters went on hunger strike, demanding talks with government representatives and at the same time adding to their previous demands for the resignation of Minister G. Janowski. Around 150 ZZR Samoobrona activists broke into the Ministry of Agriculture building in Warsaw and set up camp in one of the reception rooms on the first floor. The demonstrators' demands were the implementation of the November agreements, in particular with regard to halting the seizure of the assets of over-indebted farmers; the introduction of agricultural loans at preferential rates, 12% maximum; and a meeting with the Prime Minister.

Lepper organised anti-government demonstrations and other actions, most significantly against the politics of the Suchocka and Buzek governments, both characterised by growing social and socio-economic injustice, especially experienced in the Polish countryside.

Lepper quickly attracted the interests of the media and politicians, as well as the courts. His party gained notoriety through road blockades, protests and spilling imported grain from trains to protest against the declining prices of agricultural products. While this forced Lepper to endure several arrests and lawsuits, it also allowed him to build a reputation as a defender of the common people.

As a party leader, he challenged Aleksander Kwaśniewski in the 1995 presidential election, receiving 1.3% of the vote. In 2000, Samoobrona organised campaigns blocking major roads to bring public and mass media attention to the growing impoverishment of Polish agriculture. Lepper won 3.05% of the vote in the 2000 presidential election. In the 2001 parliamentary election, Lepper's party entered the lower chamber of the Polish Parliament (Sejm). Lepper was elected from the Koszalin constituency.

Lepper's party received 11.4% of the vote and 56 seats in the September 2005 parliamentary election, making it the third biggest party in the Sejm. Andrzej Lepper stood in the October 2005 presidential election as the party's candidate and received 15% of the vote, the third-highest result.

After the SLD-PSL government collapsed, Lepper and the Samoobrona were growing increasingly supportive of the emerging Law and Justice party. The electoral collapse of the SLD, which as a fellow left-wing party was now the main competitor of Samoobrona, caused Lepper's party to become the most popular party in Poland, according to the 2004 polls. However, the polls gradually stabilised, and by the time of the 2004 European Parliament election in Poland, Samoobrona only won the amount of support it had in 2001.

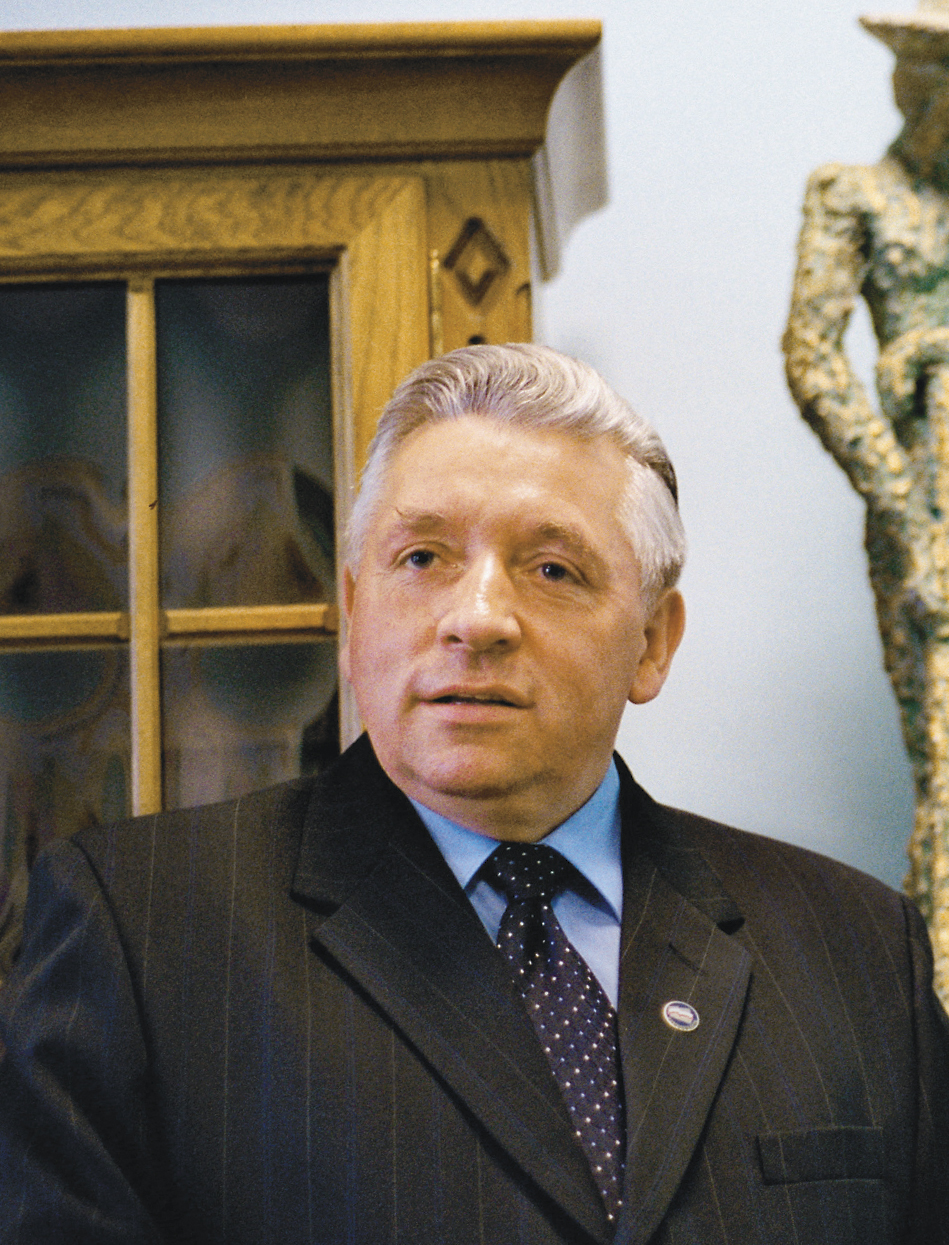
Andrzej Lepper in his office in 2002

In the 2005 Polish presidential election, Lepper finished third and won 15.1% of the popular vote in the first round, a result that impressed the media. It showed the ability of Samoobrona to win the support of a significant margin of the unemployed, farmers and low-income workers; his campaign was noted for left-wing themes that appealed to nostalgia for communist times, as Lepper's supporters often pointed to his socialist statements and biography, such as Lepper being a member of the Polish United Workers' Party, praising the communist secretary Edward Gierek, and recalling his 1990s protests against the government to guarantee state purchase of farm products at a high price. Lepper's margin was attributed to a "wake-up call" effect, as he performed the best in places with the lowest turnout, mobilising non-voters to participate in the election.

The second round was between Donald Tusk, the leader of the centre-right neoliberal Civic Platform, and Lech Kaczyński of Law and Justice. Lepper was initially opposed to both candidates, denouncing the election as a "sham democracy" of oligarchic character in which "Poles voted for different parties and still Balcerowicz jumped out of the ballot box". By Balcerowicz, Lepper meant that capitalist reforms would continue. However, Law and Justice framed the contest as a choice between "solidaristic Poland" and "liberal Poland"; to this end, Law and Justice started promoting state intervention in the economy and redistributive policies that were appealing to both the left-wing electorate and Lepper. This convinced Lepper to endorse Kaczyński, stating that it is necessary to defeat "the greater evil of a liberal presidency". This belief in the necessity to prevent neoliberal parties from governing again also led Samoobrona to form the coalition with Law and Justice in 2006, which it considered economically left-leaning. In his endorsement of Kaczyński, Lepper argued that left-wing voters must vote against neoliberalism and justified his decision on the basis of Kaczyński's declarations in support of funding social welfare, fighting unemployment and taking a tougher stance towards the European Union.

Lepper led the Samoobrona party to form a majority coalition with the Law and Justice (PiS) party in May 2006, assuming the office of the Deputy Prime Minister and Minister of Agriculture. His tenure was abruptly terminated in September 2006, but he was invited to rejoin Jarosław Kaczyński's cabinet on 16 October 2006.

In 2008, Lepper tried to salvage his political influence. He ran in the 2008 Polish Senate by-election in Krosno, which was contested by 12 other candidates. The election was organised because the incumbent senator of the Krosno district, Andrzej Mazurkiewicz of Law and Justice, suddenly died on 21 March 2008. Despite being a by-election to fill a Senate seat of the deceased senator, it attracted media attention as it was the only election of 2008 in Poland, and it fielded a few nationwide recognisable candidates such as Lepper. Lepper believed that he had a chance to succeed – he believed that since Krosno was overwhelmingly rural, 'a farmer will always get along with a farmer'. Polityka noted that Lepper "is the most recognisable politician of the dozen or so: wherever he appears, people want to have their photo taken with him." Lepper was undaunted by the criticism of the media and argued that support for him and his party in the region is high. He discussed his achievements when he served as Minister of Agriculture, highlighting his water management programme and aid for semi-subsistence farms. For Lepper, the by-election represented a chance to return to politics after the disastrous 2007 defeat; this made Lepper stand out by actively campaigning – he promised to bail out the indebted hospital in Przemyśl, help the laid-off employees of the Krosno glassworks factory, and improve the living conditions of Subcarpathian farmers. However, Maria Zbyrowska, the former leader of Samoobrona in the region, also ran in the election and criticised Lepper for running in the Podkarpackie region despite being born in Pomerania. Ultimately, Lepper won 3435 votes, which amounted to 4.1% of the popular vote; this gave him 4th place.

Commenting on Lepper's political career, Polish historians Jerzy Łukowski and Hubert Zawadzki note that Lepper won the support of those who had lost out from the post-communist changes since 1989 and became known as the protector of the poor against the "thieving elites" of Poland. On the other hand, Lepper alienated many by his blatant disregard for parliamentary procedures and his party's abusive behaviour in the Sejm and aggressive demonstrations and blockades across the country.

== Political style and views ==
Samoobrona (SRP) and Lepper successfully tapped into the disillusionment felt by millions of poor citizens who had not benefited from Poland's transition to capitalism and entry into the European Union. Lepper presented himself and his party as "the only one in Poland, which speaks in the name of all people" and made it his goal to "defend poor and unemployed people, honest and enterprising, but disadvantaged by the economic system". Lepper embodied the public discontent and social costs of the Balcerowicz Plan, an economic plan drafted by Jeffrey Sachs that dissolved the socialist planned economy in Poland in favour of a neoliberal market economy. This was achieved at the price of massive unemployment, layoffs and a 40% decline in real wages, as well as a large expansion of income inequality and slashed welfare. Polish political scientist Jarosław Tomasiewicz notes that Lepper showed that while internationally the Polish capitalist transformation was celebrated as successful, in reality it "took place against a backdrop of repression of the workers, kidnappings and arrests of trade unionists, violent clashes with protesters or a mass exodus of desperate workers". Lepper's popularity only grew even as the plan brought economic growth by 2000, as this growth did not trickle down to the impoverished masses.

Lepper was classified as a far-left populist and was dubbed "Polish Chávez" by the international media. He has also been compared to figures such as José Bové, Evo Morales, and Juan Perón in that regard. He was known for his anti-capitalist rhetoric, and the pamphlets distributed by this party included declarations such as, "Capitalism is by no means an immutable constant. It must eventually make way for new forms of human relations and a new environmental morality. The new post-capitalist era is already emerging." Lepper described himself as a "social leftist and proud national Pole" and called for the return of socialism in Poland, arguing that it had "not yet reached full maturity". Lepper promoted socialism on the basis of Catholic social teaching and the tradition of the Polish peasant movement, and his views were described as a mix of "folkish Catholicism and Polish socialism" by the media.

The political rhetoric of Lepper was also full of nostalgic references to the communist Polish People's Republic, especially in regard to the rule of reformist Edward Gierek. Lepper's main electorate became former communists as well as former employees of socialist rural cooperatives known as State Agricultural Farms. He divided the Polish society into the 'children of Balcerowicz', which he described as businessmen who built 'capital empires' on privatisation, as well as the 'victims of Balcerowicz', who "were robbed by Balcerowicz's financial politics", and were plunged into poverty by the neoliberal shock therapy reforms.

Lepper's communist background was also visible in his stances regarding foreign policy – he was critical of the European Union and favoured a pro-Eastern alignment of Poland. He accused pro-European parties of trying "to transform Poland into an outlet for the West's surplus production". He was a staunch opponent of the sentiment that Polish issues could be solved by integration with the West and the European Union, which he dubbed "a fashion for foreignness". Lepper argued that any arrangements with the West would be unequal for Poland and make Poland exploited as an economically inferior country; he warned that Poland would be "economically erased from the map of the world." In reference to neoliberal policies such as privatisation and austerity, Lepper considered them "economic genocide".

Referring to his membership in the PZPR (Polish communist party), Lepper said, "I have no regrets and absolutely no reason to be ashamed of being in the party." He defended Communist Poland as overall positive, noting that despite problems such as the overgrowth of the bureaucracy and anti-Catholic policies, it was a "semi-sovereign state" that had more achievements than faults, such as the post-war reconstruction, development of industry, infrastructure and housing, the development of education and health care, and social security, as well as "the social advancement of millions of formerly disinherited citizens". Lepper praised socialism as "a system which put man first" and which was "in line with the commandments of the Church". He also believed that the downfall of Communist Poland was caused by the anti-worker elites of the PZPR, while praising the rank-and-file members who stayed true to "genuinely socialist ideals and values". Lepper and his party were considered Catholic socialists, as well as agrarian socialists.

According to Polish political scientist Andrzej Piasecki, Lepper's anti-EU stance was not based on nationalist, anti-Western or religious beliefs, but rather on Lepper's analysis of social class – he argued that the neoliberal and laissez-faire policies of the EU exploit the poor and sought to defend disadvantaged social classes such as "farmers, the unemployed, pensioners and all those dissatisfied with the changes in Poland after 1989 from the [European] Union". Lepper was unsatisfied with the settlement Poland reached with the EU, stating in his address to the Sejm: "You have negotiated conditions that have led to the fact that today 5 million people in Poland are out of work, that 90 per cent of them are not entitled to benefits, that agricultural production has fallen by 40 per cent, and that pensioners have no money for medicine." Samoobrona also argued that the terms negotiated with the EU resulted in Poland being dominated by larger and richer countries, particularly Germany and France.

A few weeks before the referendum, Lepper declared it necessary "to renegotiate the arrangements concluded in Copenhagen". Lepper and his party insisted they are not anti-European but rather argued that the negotiated terms were unfavourable for the state and that Poland should enter the EU together with Ukraine, which for Lepper would have improved the negotiating position with Poland and ensured that Poland would be "a partner rather than a supplicant" to the EU. Lepper argued that within the EU, Poland fulfils "the role of a third category country in the European Union. A country that is, in a semi-colonial way, a provider of young workforce and a market".

However, Lepper and his party took a neutral stance towards the 2003 Polish European Union membership referendum, adopting a slogan: "European Union? The choice is yours!" Samoobrona stressed that joining the EU also entails dangers and drawbacks which are either downplayed or ignored. Lepper stressed that he personally "is in favour of the EU, but not under these conditions". The party treated the results of the referendum with scepticism – Lepper argued that with a much higher turnout, the no vote would have won. According to Piasecki, Lepper's analysis was likely correct, as the domination of pro-EU views in the media and endorsement of the EU by Pope John Paul II resulted in most EU opponents not voting in the referendum.

Lepper remained a Eurosceptic but later toned down his position. During his tenure as Deputy Prime Minister and Minister of Agriculture, Lepper worked to support Polish agriculture within European structures and on his departure was described by EU officials as pragmatic and professional. Janusz Wojciechowski, a long-standing Polish Member of the European Parliament, argued that contrary to his reputation as a vulgar populist, Lepper "was a really good minister of agriculture" whose conduct was professional yet tough. Wojciechowski credits Lepper with negotiating numerous concessions for Polish farmers and fruit producers from the European Union and sees this as proof that Lepper's "concern for the poor and excluded was not for show, but genuine".

Lepper was one of the few high-profile politicians who consistently opposed Poland's involvement in American global military operations. He was involved in promoting close relations with the country's eastern neighbours: Ukraine, Russia and Belarus.

The core of Lepper's views was opposition to globalisation, capitalism and neoliberalism, which Lepper considered epitomised by Leszek Balcerowicz. Lepper's party stressed the primacy of man before capital and used slogans such as "Man, Family, Work – a life of dignity". It called for a kind of socialism characterised by "respect for life in all its forms, recognition of the role of family, nation, moral tradition, social benevolence and solidarity". The party explicitly tied itself to the Catholic social teaching, declaring, "The Self-Defence of the Republic of Poland is guided by the social teaching of the Church and fully shares the indications contained in the encyclicals of the greatest moral authority of our time, as we recognise Pope John Paul II." However, Lepper himself criticised the Catholic hierarchy for what he considered siding with the rich and passively approving of capitalism. At the same time, Lepper considered the Church a moral authority and adopted the Church's stance on social issues such as abortion, euthanasia, or death penalty.

Some of his many infamous quotes include "There's too much talk about democracy – people can see it's only for elites. Only 5% of the population have made any money out of it at the expense of all the others", "Capitalism is shaped to serve a small group of states", "We are a radical party, open to all disadvantaged people who are starving at home", and "If the law works against people and generally accepted notions of legality then it isn't law. The only thing to do is to break it for the sake of the majority." Lepper himself appeared to be a restless man, not easily placated and not inclined to settle down as an officeholder, as his participation in Kaczyński's government showed. With the votes of the left-wing majority in the Sejm, in 2001 he was elected as Vice-Speaker of the Sejm (Wicemarszałek Sejmu), but after violating time constraints in debates, he was dismissed. Among Lepper and SO's undertakings in parliament were such incidents as the use of their own loudspeakers in the Sejm and claims that Robert Smoktunowicz of the liberal Civic Platform (Platforma Obywatelska) engaged in the gemstone trade with the Taliban.

The Interregional Academy of Personnel Management in Kyiv, a private institution that actively promotes antisemitism, awarded Lepper with two honorary doctorates and an honorary professorship. The Anti-Defamation League strongly condemned Lepper for accepting these titles.

== Criminal charges ==
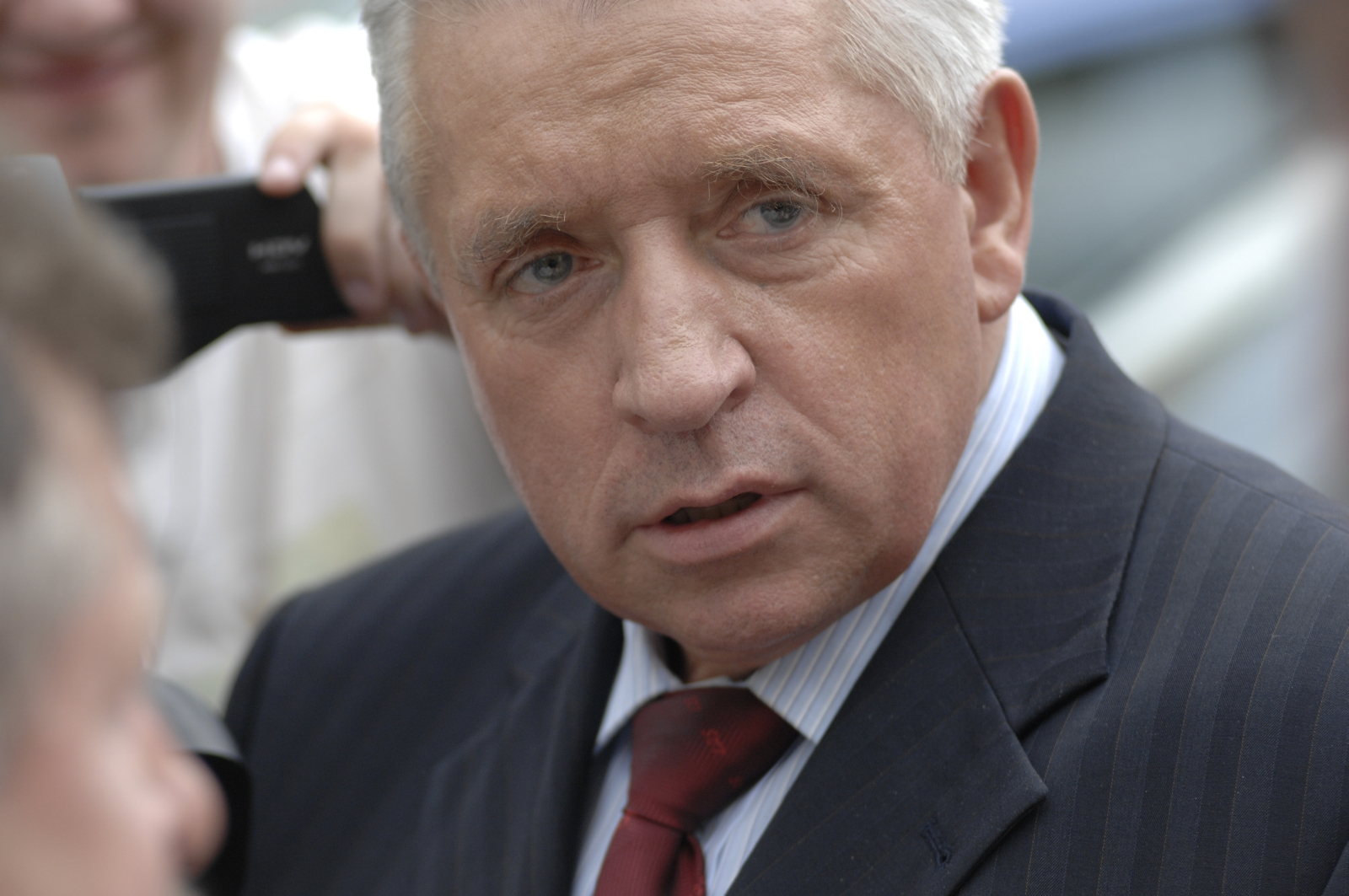
Andrzej Lepper in 2010

Lepper was charged with criminal offences, including assault, blocking roads and dumping grain on railroad tracks in the course of anti-government demonstrations (The New York Times, 2006).

In May 2001, Lepper was sentenced to sixteen months in prison. In May 2006, Polish students protested against the coalition government and also mocked Lepper's recent criminal conviction for slander, chanting "Lepper to prison".

As of 2007, Lepper faced criminal charges for slander and levelling corruption accusations against ministers and members of parliament (Financial Times, 2002).

In December 2006, a female party member claimed that Lepper and party deputy Stanisław Łyżwiński had demanded sexual favours in exchange for a job in a regional Samoobrona party office. After the publication of these claims in the Gazeta Wyborcza, several other women came forward with similar accusations. Poland's chief prosecutor, Janusz Kaczmarek, later launched an investigation into the abuse allegations against both men. In February 2010, Andrzej Lepper was sentenced to two years and three months in jail after being found guilty of demanding and accepting sexual favours from female members of his Samoobrona party. The district court in central Poland also sentenced former Samoobrona party deputy Stanisław Łyżwiński to five years for rape and taking sexual advantage of female members of his party. Lepper said that the entire case against him was "imagined" and that he would appeal the decision. In 2011, the court overturned the verdict against Lepper, citing procedural errors such as failure to take into account Lepper's alibi. At the same time, Stanisław Łyżwiński's sentence was reduced from five years to three years and six months.

== Fall, death, and controversy ==
On 9 July 2007, Prime Minister Kaczyński dismissed Lepper from the government, which Kaczyński said was due to suspicions that Lepper was involved in corruption. On 10 July, Lepper said that Samoobrona would withdraw from the ruling coalition but later on the same day said that the party would remain in the coalition conditionally. Lepper claimed to have been the victim of a politically motivated sting operation, initiated by Kaczynski and PiS, and he demanded that a parliamentary inquiry be conducted to investigate the legality and motivation of the Central Anticorruption Bureau operation mounted against him. This was one of the conditions put to PiS in return for Samoobrona remaining within the coalition.

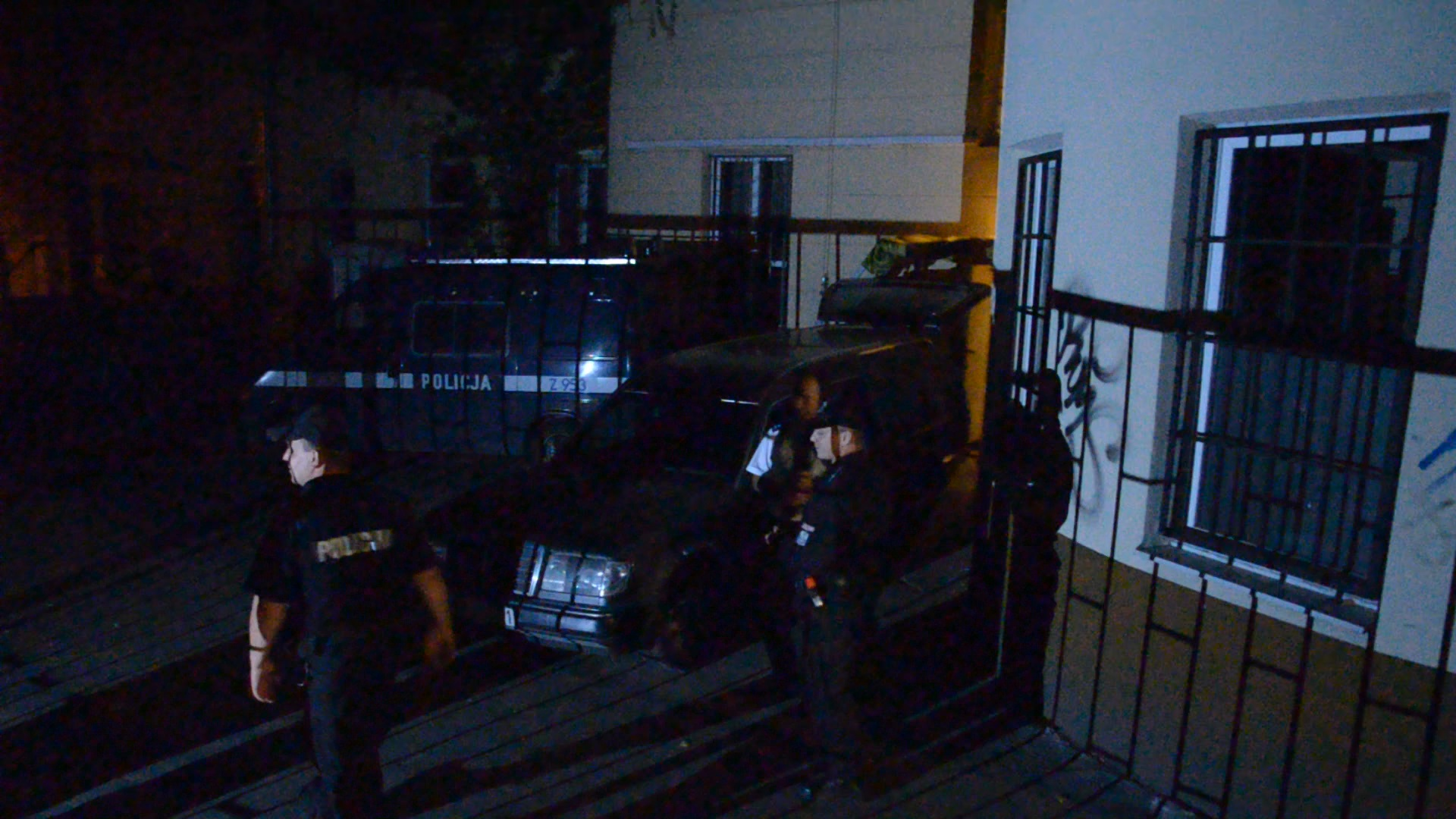
August 2011, police guarding the party headquarters as Lepper's body is transported from the scene

On 16 July 2007, Lepper, together with Roman Giertych, chairman of another junior coalition partner, League of Polish Families, announced a merger of their parties, to be called League and Self-Defence (LiS). On August 5, the party quit the ruling coalition, leaving it without a majority.

Early parliamentary elections for both houses of parliament (Sejm and Senat) were held on 21 October 2007, after the Sejm voted for its own dissolution on 7 September. The party suffered huge voter backlash and failed to cross the 5% electoral threshold for Sejm representation. Consequently, it lost all its seats. Lepper was a candidate in the 2010 Polish presidential election but received just 1.28% of the votes and so did not proceed to the second round.

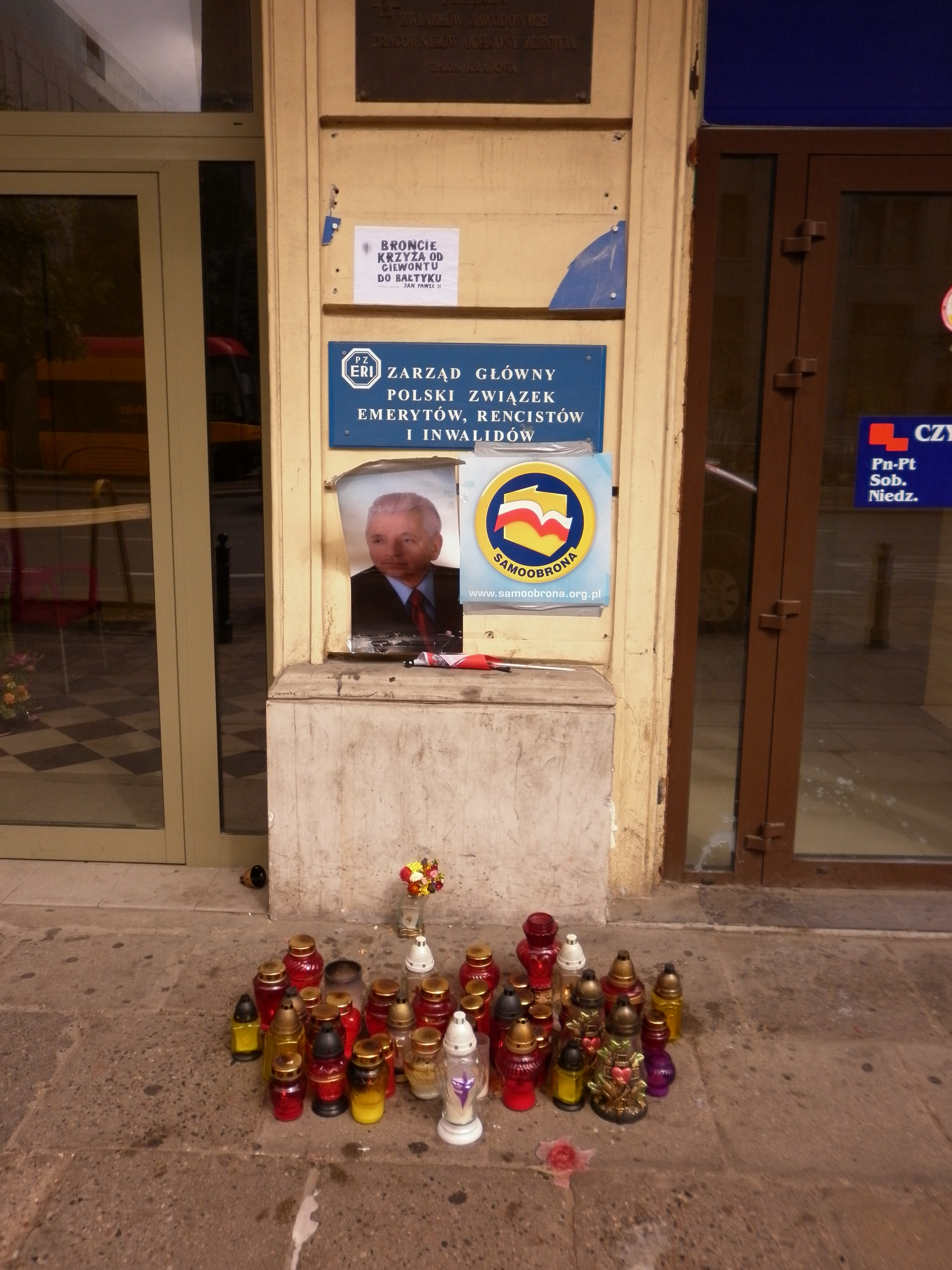
Tributes to Lepper in the days following his death outside the party headquarters where his body was found

Lepper was found dead in his Warsaw office on 5 August 2011. Police said that he likely committed suicide. The public prosecutor's office conducted a year-long investigation to determine possible motives for his suicide. Lepper was hanging from a ceiling hook for a punching bag. Since the death occurred on a Friday, an autopsy could not be conducted until the next working week began. After his autopsy, the involvement of a third party was ruled out, and the investigation ended in late 2012. It was determined that Lepper suffered from crushing depression due to his enormous debts on all fronts, including at his farm, his political defeat, and sex scandals. Party colleagues disputed this claim, stating there were no signs of his imminent suicide or any depression in the lead-up to his death. They pointed out that Lepper was said to be in good spirits and planning a political comeback, with his son having recently completely recovered from a near-death illness reportedly caused by pesticide poisoning that previously took a toll on Lepper's stress load. Sceptics were quick to argue that the postponement of Lepper's autopsy reduced chances to detect foul play, reminiscent of multiple other cases in post-communist Poland where suspicious deaths had been the matter of much controversy due to the alleged use of pancuronium bromide (known in Poland as Pawulon) as a 'fast and quick killer' that became undetectable after a number of days, most notably entering the popular imagination in the Skin Hunters case.

Moreover, immediately after Lepper's death, sceptics also pointed to suspicious details at the crime scene, such as a lack of fingerprints on the tools used in his death and his acquaintances' denial that he had any motivation to commit suicide. A scaffolding had been placed directly outside of the window of his office, which had been fully opened, and all CCTV cameras in the area had malfunctioned on the day of his death. The unexplained circumstances of Lepper's death fuelled popular urban legends ranging from the Belarusian KGB to an inside job by the Polish PiS party and special services, apparently related to his words in the Sejm that he had evidence about serious corruption and criminal activities involving high-ranking government officials. Lepper acted erratically prior to his death and claimed to fear for his life and to be targeted by surveillance drones and wiretaps capturing his private conversations. Reporters who dealt with the death of Lepper pointed out the deaths, including suicides, of three of his close co-workers and party members having preceded it: Róża Żarska, Ryszard Kuciński, and Wiesław Podgórski. Ultimately, an investigation found that the death was unmistakably a suicide by hanging, though popular opinion among many Poles and even some high-ranking officials, such as former prime ministers Leszek Miller and Jarosław Kaczyński, as well as other prominent politicians across the political spectrum, such as Radosław Sikorski and Sławomir Mentzen, support the theory claiming otherwise.

== Electoral history ==
=== Sejm ===
Election year	Party	# of votes	% of vote	District	Elected?
1991	Provincial Farmers' Self-Defence Committee	1,617	0.67%	Koszalin	No
1993	Self-Defence of the Republic of Poland	24,480	13.21%	Koszalin	No
2001	Self-Defence of the Republic of Poland	44,814	21.78%	Koszalin	Yes
2005	Self-Defence of the Republic of Poland	33,535	19.11%	Koszalin	Yes
2007	Self-Defence of the Republic of Poland	8,459	3.43%	Koszalin	No

=== Senate ===
Election year	Party	# of votes	% of vote	Voivodeship	Elected?
1997	Self-Defence of the Republic of Poland	24,614	15.86%	Koszalin	No
2008 (Note: On 22 June 2008, by-elections were held for the Senate seat no. 21 because of the death of the incumbent Andrzej Mazurkiewicz of Law and Justice party. The seat was won by Stanisław Zając.)	Self-Defence of the Republic of Poland	3,435	3.81%	Subcarpathian	No

=== Regional assemblies ===
Election year	Party	# of votes	% of vote	Sejmik	Elected?
1998	Social Alliance	24,614	15.86%	West Pomerania	Yes

=== Presidential ===
Election year	1st round		Elected?	2nd round endorsement
Election year	# of overall votes	% of overall vote	Elected?	2nd round endorsement
1995	235,797	1.3% (#9)	No	Aleksander Kwaśniewski
2000	537,570 (3,05%)	3.05% (#5)	No	No second round
2005	2,259,094	15.11% (#3)	No	Lech Kaczyński
2010	214,657	1.28% (#7)	No	Opposed Jarosław Kaczyński

== Notes ==
Political offices
Preceded by Zyta Gilowska	Deputy Prime Minister of Poland; 2006	Succeeded by Ludwik Dorn
Preceded by Krzysztof Jurgiel	Minister of Agriculture; 2006–2007	Succeeded by Wojciech Mojzesowicz
Preceded by Ludwik Dorn	Deputy Prime Minister of Poland; 2006–2007	Succeeded by Przemysław Gosiewski
Party political offices
Preceded by None	Leader of Self-Defence of the Republic of Poland; 1992–2011	Succeeded by Jerzy Piasecki
