= Bronisław Komorowski =

President of Poland from 2010 to 2015

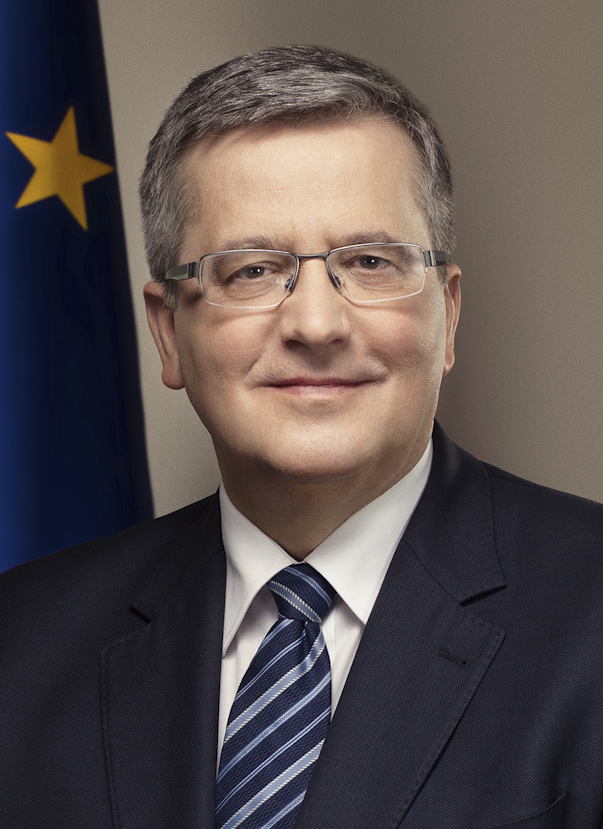
- Official portrait, 2013

President of Poland
- In office 6 August 2010 – 6 August 2015
- Prime Minister: Donald Tusk; Ewa Kopacz
- Preceded by: Grzegorz Schetyna (acting)
- Succeeded by: Andrzej Duda
- Acting; 10 April 2010 – 8 July 2010
- Prime Minister: Donald Tusk
- Preceded by: Lech Kaczyński
- Succeeded by: Bogdan Borusewicz (acting)

Marshal of the Sejm
- In office 5 November 2007 – 8 July 2010
- Preceded by: Ludwik Dorn
- Succeeded by: Grzegorz Schetyna

Deputy Marshal of the Sejm
- In office 25 October 2005 – 4 November 2007
- Marshal: Marek Jurek; Ludwik Dorn

Minister of National Defence
- In office 16 June 2000 – 19 October 2001
- Prime Minister: Jerzy Buzek
- Preceded by: Janusz Onyszkiewicz
- Succeeded by: Jerzy Szmajdziński

Member of the Sejm
- In office 25 November 1991 – 8 July 2010
- Constituency: 20 – Warsaw II (1997–2010); 32 – Piła (1993–1997); 36 – Katowice (1991–1993)

Personal details
- Born: Bronisław Maria Komorowski; 4 June 1952 (age 74) Oborniki Śląskie, Poland
- Party: Independent (2010–present)
- Other political affiliations: UD (before 1994); UW (1994–1997); SKL (before 2001); PO (2001–2010)
- Spouse: Anna Dziadzia (m. 1977)
- Children: 5
- Education: University of Warsaw

Bronisław Maria Komorowski (Note: Polish: [brɔˈɲiswaf kɔmɔˈrɔfskʲi]) (born 4 June 1952) is a Polish politician and historian who served as the 5th president of Poland from 2010 to 2015. Komorowski previously served as Marshal of the Sejm from 2007 to 2010 and in this position Komorowski exercised the powers and duties of acting president following the death of President Lech Kaczyński in a plane crash on 10 April 2010. Earlier, from 2000 to 2001, he served as Minister of National Defence.

Komorowski was then the governing Civic Platform party's candidate in the resulting presidential election, which he won in the second round of voting on 4 July 2010. He was sworn in as president on 6 August 2010. Komorowski thus became the second person to serve on two occasions as Polish head of state since 1918, after Maciej Rataj. On 24 May 2015, Komorowski was defeated in the second round by Andrzej Duda in the 2015 presidential election. As a result, Komorowski was succeeded by Duda on 6 August 2015.

Komorowski was the only president of the Third Polish Republic not to experience a cohabitation while in office. As of 2026, he remains the only Polish president elected with the backing of the Civic Platform party.

== Early life and education ==
Bronisław Maria Komorowski was born in Oborniki Śląskie to Zygmunt Leon Komorowski (1925–1992), professor of African Studies at the University of Warsaw and Jadwiga Komorowska (née Szalkowska) (1921–2025). Bronisław's grandfather Juliusz Komorowski was the last Komorowski family owner of the Kavoliškis Manor in the Lithuanian village of Kavoliškis near Rokiškis. Juliusz Komorowski fluently spoke in the Lithuanian language and taught it to his children. Six generations of the Komorowski family owned Kavoliškis Manor until 1940 when Lithuania was occupied by the Soviets. According to Bronisław Komorowski, while living in Poland his family continued some Lithuanian traditions: consumption of traditional Lithuanian Kūčios dish Kūčiukai and Christmas wafers, also they "decorated the Christmas tree like in Kavoliškis". Furthermore, Komorowski remembered that his grandmother, Maria Magdalena Gorska, sang songs in the Lithuanian language and told him about Lithuania.

From 1957 to 1959, he lived in Józefów near Otwock. From 1959 to 1966, he also attended elementary school in Pruszków. In 1966, he transferred to Warsaw and graduated from Cyprian Kamil Norwid High School no. 24. For many years, he was affiliated with the Scout Movement. During his studies, he was a Scout instructor in 208 WDHiZ "Parasol" Battalion in Mokotów. He met his future wife through Scouting.

Komorowski recalled that in his adolescent years, his father took him near the border, ordered him to kneel and to pray with the Lord's Prayer. Komorowski's father also told him that he should remember that his ancestors' land is behind the barbed wire and that he has to love it.

In 1977, he finished his studies in history at the University of Warsaw. From 1977 to 1980, he was an editor at the journal Słowo Powszechne.

== Dissident activity ==
In the Polish People's Republic, Komorowski took part in the democratic movement as an underground publisher and co-operated with Antoni Macierewicz on the monthly Głos (1977–1981).

In 1980, he was sentenced along with activists of the Movement for Defense of Human and Civic Rights to one month in prison for organizing a demonstration on 11 November 1979 (the judge who presided the trial was Andrzej Kryże).

From 1980 to 1981, he worked in the Centre of Social Investigation of NSZZ "Solidarity". On 27 September 1981, he was one of the signatories of the founding declaration of the Clubs in the Service of Independence. He was interned while Poland was under martial law. From 1981 to 1989, he taught at the Lower Seminary in Niepokalanów. In the spring of 1989, Bronisław visited the Lithuanian village of Kavoliškis and toured the Kavoliškis Manor complex, which was previously owned by his ancestors.

== Third Republic ==
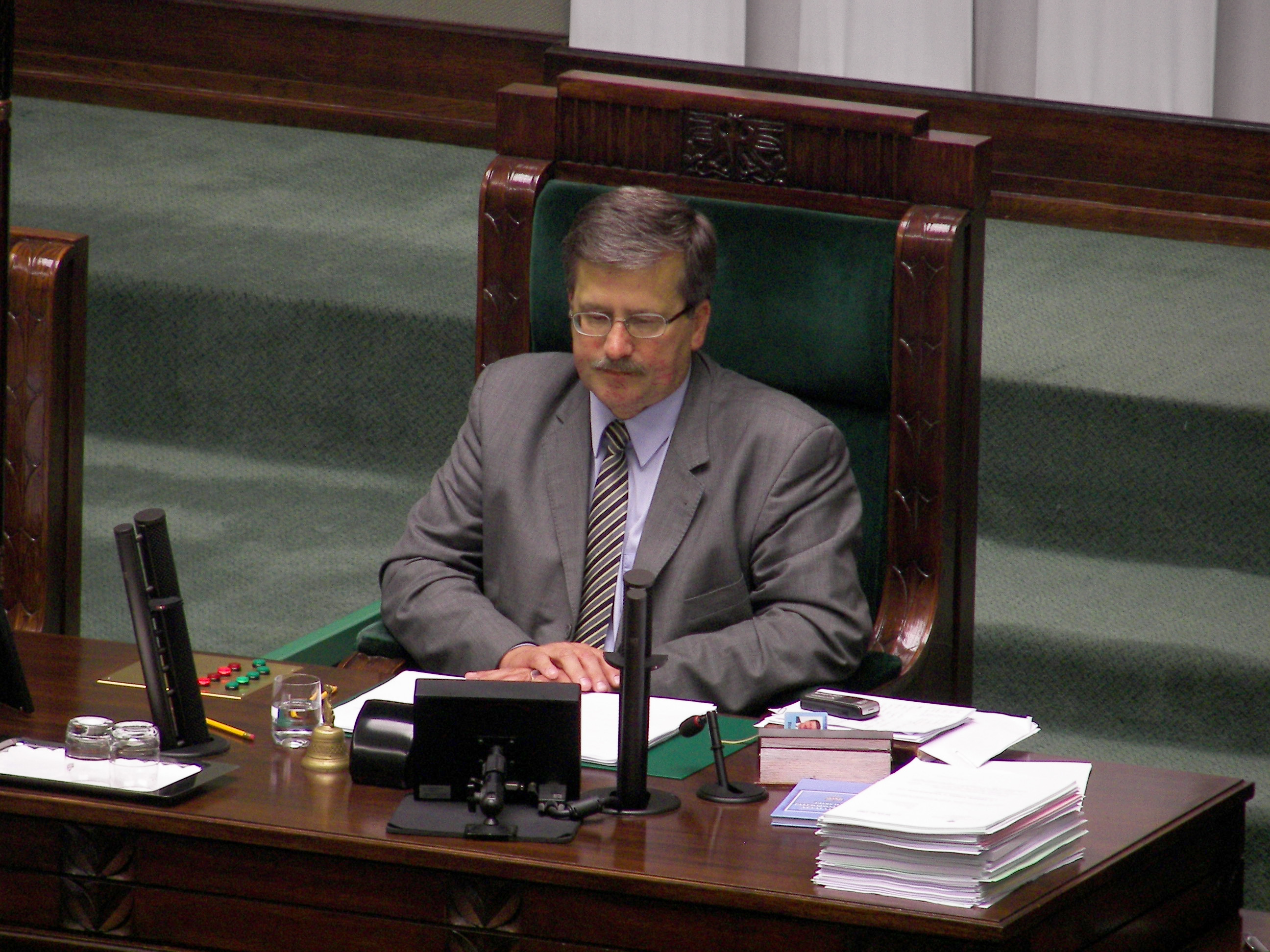
Bronisław Komorowski as Deputy Marshal in Sejm, September 2007

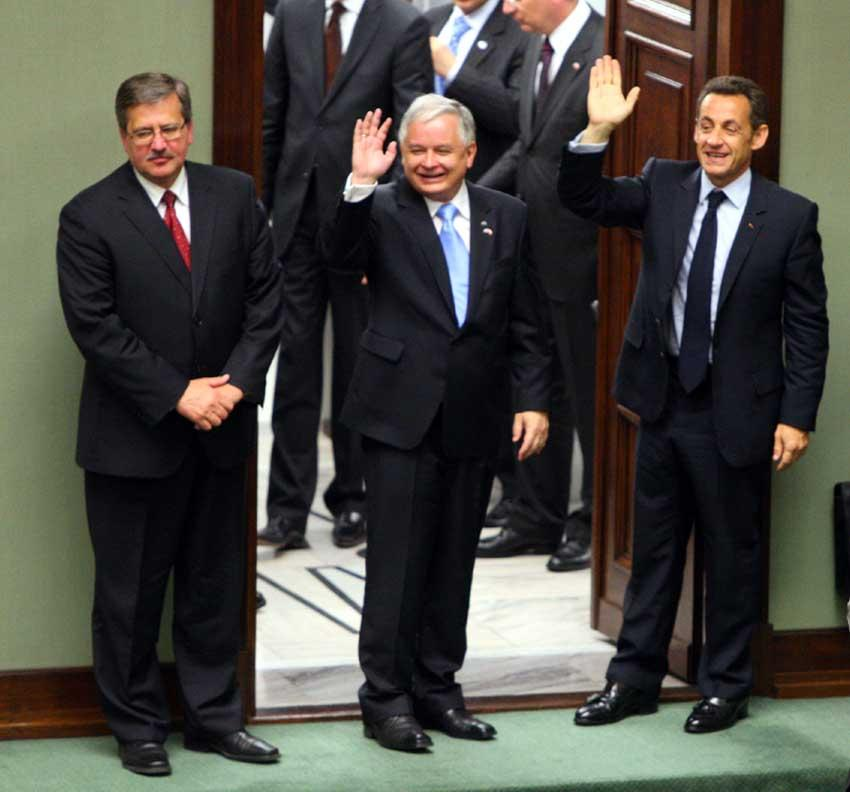
Bronisław Komorowski with Lech Kaczyński and Nicolas Sarkozy

From 1989 to 1990, he was the minister Aleksander Hall's office, and from 1990 to 1993, the civil vice minister of national defence in the governments of Tadeusz Mazowiecki, Jan Krzysztof Bielecki and Hanna Suchocka. In the early 1990s, he was involved with the Democratic Union and Freedom Union. From 1993 to 1995, he was the general secretary of these parties.

As a candidate of the Democratic Union, he was elected to parliament in 1991 and in 1993. In 1997, during the 2nd Sejm, together with a group of Warsaw University activists under the management of Jan Rokita, he created Koło Konserwatywno-Ludowe. In the same year Koło Konserwatywno-Ludowe joined the newly created Conservative People's Party (SKL), which joined Solidarity Electoral Action (AWS).

In September 1997 Komorowski was elected as a candidate of AWS. From 1997 to 2000, he presided over the Parliamentary National Defence Committee, and from 2000 to 2001 served as the minister of national defence in the government of Jerzy Buzek. In 2001, while still a minister in the minority AWS government, Komorowski, along with some activists from SKL, became a member of Civic Platform (PO). He stood for election to the 4th Sejm as a candidate of PO. Again, he was elected, this time for the Warsaw constituency.

After the inauguration of the new parliament, he resigned from SKL. Since 2001, he has been a member of the National Civic Platform Board. In the 4th Sejm, he was the deputy chairman of the Parliamentary National Defence Committee and a member of the Parliamentary Committee on Foreign Affairs.

He won election to the 5th Sejm in a district outside Warsaw. On 26 October 2005, he was elected Vice Speaker of the Sejm. 398 MPs voted in favour of his candidacy. His party had earlier recommended him as a candidate for Speaker. His candidacy, in defiance of precedent, was rejected by Law and Justice (PiS), which voted for Marek Jurek. This created an unfavourable climate for further discussions regarding a PO-PiS coalition.

After the resignation of Marek Jurek as Speaker of the Sejm on 25 April 2007, Civic Platform announced Komorowski's candidacy for Speaker. On 27 April 2007, the Sejm rejected his nomination, and Ludwik Dorn from PiS became the new marshal. 189 MPs voted for Komorowski. Komorowski became Deputy Marshal.

Komorowski took first place on the PO list for the Warsaw constituency in the 2007 parliamentary election and received 139,320 votes.

== Marshal of the Sejm ==
On 5 November 2007, in the first session of the 6th Sejm of the Polish Republic, Bronisław Komorowski was elected Speaker by 292 votes. He stood against Krzysztof Putra from PiS, who received 160 votes. Stefan Niesiołowski, Krzysztof Putra, Jarosław Kalinowski, Jerzy Szmajdziński were elected Vice Speakers.

On 27 March 2010, he was chosen by PO members to be their candidate in 2010 presidential election.

== President of Poland ==
=== Acting President ===
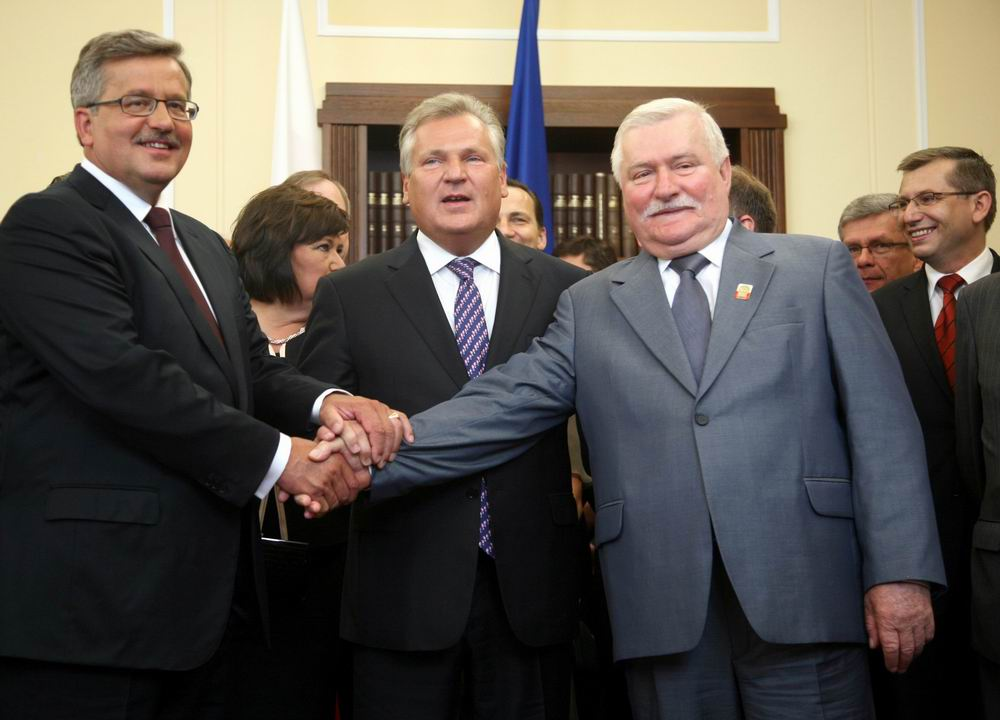
President Bronisław Komorowski with two former presidents, Lech Wałęsa and Aleksander Kwaśniewski

Komorowski became acting president on 10 April 2010 following the death of President Lech Kaczyński. His first decision was to announce seven days of national mourning beginning on 10 April.

According to the Constitution of Poland, Komorowski was required to set a date for the next presidential election within 14 days of assuming the position, the election date coming within 60 days of that announcement. On 21 April, his office announced that the election would be held on 20 June.

In the election, he got 41.54% of votes in the first round and then faced Jarosław Kaczyński, who got 36.46% of votes in the first round. In the runoff, Komorowski was elected president (8 933 887 valid votes, 53,01%) and formally took office on 6 August 2010.

=== Presidency ===
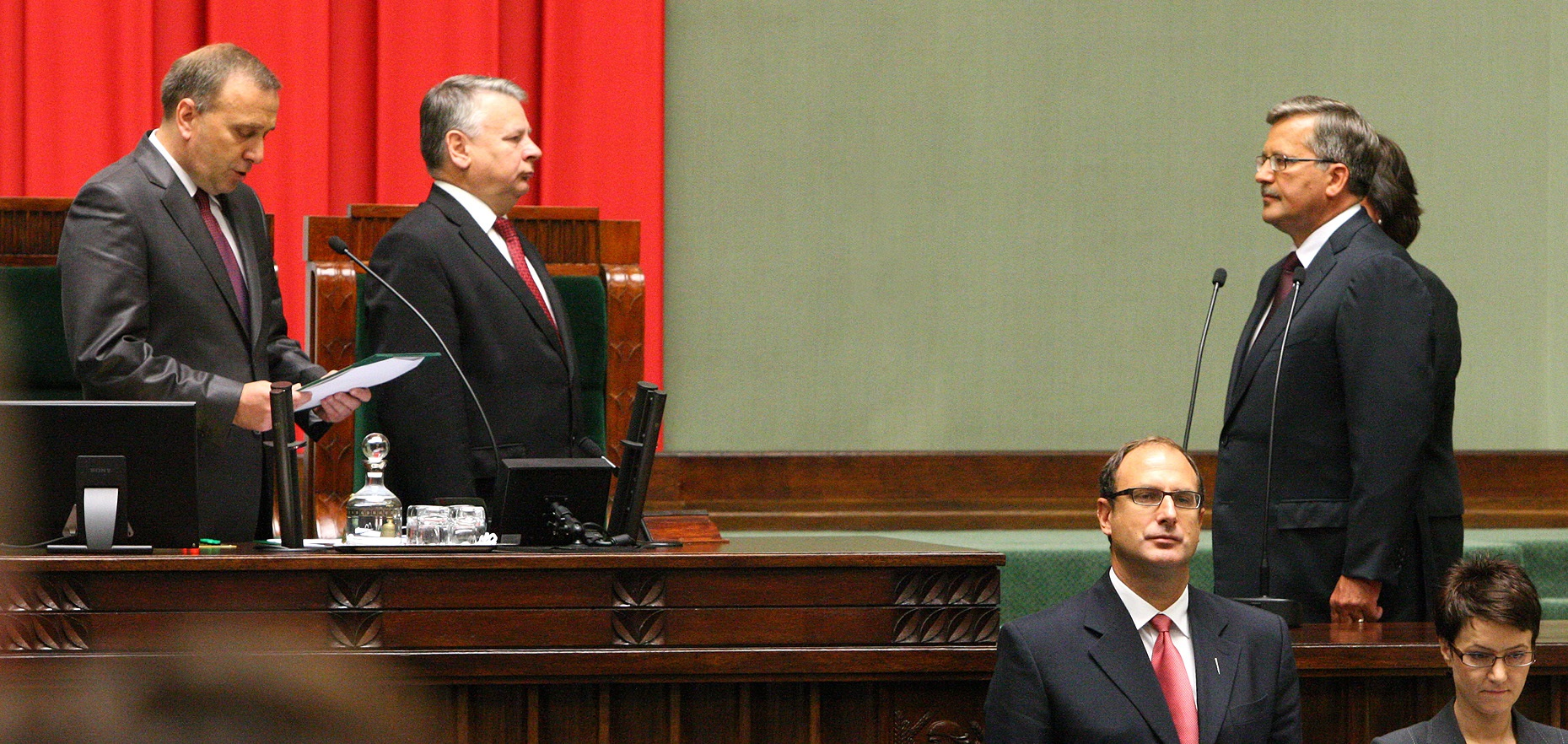
Bronisław Komorowski takes the oath of office as president in front of the National Assembly in Warsaw, 6 August 2010

Following the death of Władysław Stasiak, the chief of the Chancellery of the President of the Republic of Poland, Komorowski appointed Jacek Michałowski to succeed him on an acting basis. A high number of vacancies following the Smolensk crash necessitated numerous other appointments. On 12 April, he appointed retired General Stanisław Koziej head of the National Security Bureau in place of the late Aleksander Szczygło.

On 29 April 2010, Komorowski signed into law a parliamentary act that reformed the Institute of National Remembrance.

On 27 May 2010, Komorowski nominated Marek Belka, former Finance Minister and Prime Minister (2004–2005) of a then-leftist government, to be the president of the National Bank of Poland in place of the late Sławomir Skrzypek.

Following his election, Komorowski announced that he would resign from the Sejm on 8 July 2010, and thus cease to be a marshal and an acting president (his successor as an acting president was the next marshal of the Sejm Grzegorz Schetyna, who held the position for about a month before Komorowski's formal inauguration).

On 25 May 2015, following his defeat in the second round of the 2015 presidential election, Komorowski conceded the presidency to rival Andrzej Duda, after the latter won a 51.5% majority. His term ended on 6 August 2015, when Duda was sworn in as the new president.

==== Attitude towards Ukraine ====
On 22 February 2015 he supported the idea of the President of Ukraine Petro Poroshenko to introduce a UN peacekeeping mission in Donbas.

On 9 April, during a visit to Kyiv, he spoke from the rostrum of the Verkhovna Rada of Ukraine. During his speech, he stated: "There will be no stable, secure Europe if Ukraine does not become part of it, and only the blind can not see the presence of Russian troops in the Donbas." Politicians in Ukraine and Poland called the speech historic.

On 2 July, he visited Lviv, where he received an honorary doctorate from Lviv University. During a joint press conference with Poroshenko, he stated that he would create his own institute to deal with Polish-Ukrainian relations.

== Personal life ==
Komorowski has been married to Anna Dembowska (born 1954) since 1977. The couple has five children, Zofia Aleksandra (born 1979), Tadeusz Jan (born 1981), Maria Anna (born 1983), Piotr Zygmunt (born 1985) and Elżbieta Jadwiga (born 1987).

Komorowski is proud that his family is from Lithuania and he always sought to stress this. In 2015, during the awarding ceremony of the honorary citizen of Rokiškis Komorowski said that half of his heart is Lithuanian and that this land is very precious to him, as well as that he understand everything in the Lithuanian language. According to Komorowski, in the post-World War II years he felt "ripped from the roots" and that his children also have sentiments for Lithuania. Komorowski has no plans to return to Lithuania for permanent inhabitation, however he is always looking to visit Lithuania when there is an occasion. Komorowski expressed in 2015 that he wished that in his family their family's heritage would be more than just a sentiment and that it would stay, as well as that it would serve for the cooperation of Lithuanians and Poles.

A university department named the Bronisław Komorowski Centre for Political Practice was created at Collegium Civitas in Warsaw in 2015, and Komorowski gives lectures there to students, especially specialising in Journalism and New Media.

== Honours and awards ==
=== National honours ===
- Poland:
  - Knight of the Order of the White Eagle (ex officio)
  - Grand Cross of the Order of Polonia Restituta (ex officio)

=== Foreign honours ===
- Croatia: Grand Cross of the Grand Order of King Tomislav (8 May 2013)
- Estonia: Collar of the Order of the Cross of Terra Mariana (14 March 2014)
- France: Grand Cross of the National Order of the Legion of Honour (16 November 2012)
- Greece: Grand Cross of the Order of the Redeemer (8 July 2013)
- Italy: Knight Grand Cross with Collar of the Order of Merit of the Italian Republic (10 June 2012)
- Latvia: Commander Grand Cross with Chain of the Order of the Three Stars (23 November 2012)
- Malta: Honorary Companion of Honour of the National Order of Merit (2009)
- Monaco: Knight Grand Cross of the Order of Saint Charles (October 2012)
- Netherlands: Knight Grand Cross of the Order of the Netherlands Lion (24 June 2014)
- North Macedonia: Recipient of the Order 8-September (September 2013)
- Norway: Grand Cross of the Order of St. Olav (9 May 2012)
- Portugal: Grand Collar of the Order of Prince Henry (19 April 2012)
- Slovakia: Grand Cross of the Order of the White Double Cross (20 May 2014)
- Sweden: Knight of the Royal Order of the Seraphim (4 May 2011)
- Ukraine: Member 1st Class of the Order of Prince Yaroslav the Wise (2008)

=== Distinctions ===
- Lithuania:
  - Doctor honoris causa of the Mykolas Romeris University in Vilnius, Lithuania (14 January 2008)
  - Doctor honoris causa of the Vytautas Magnus University in Kaunas, Lithuania (June 2015)
  - Honorary citizen of Rokiškis

== State visits gallery ==
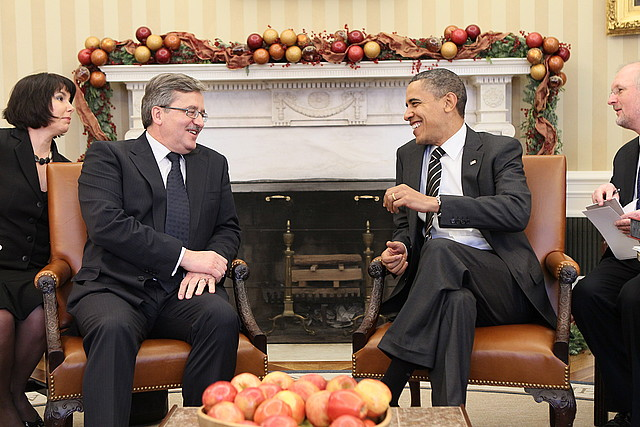
President Bronisław Komorowski with Barack Obama (Washington, 2010)

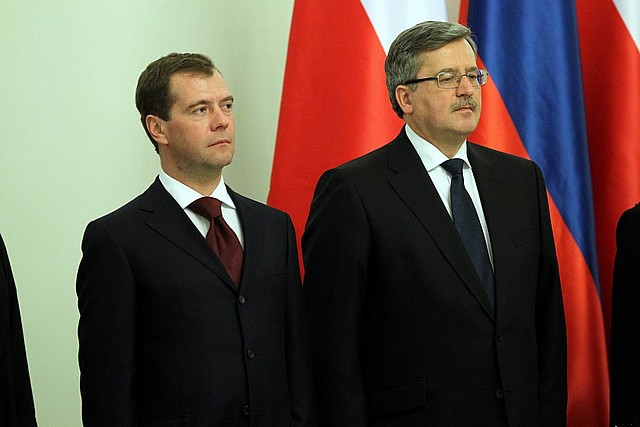
President Bronisław Komorowski with President Dmitry Medvedev (2010)

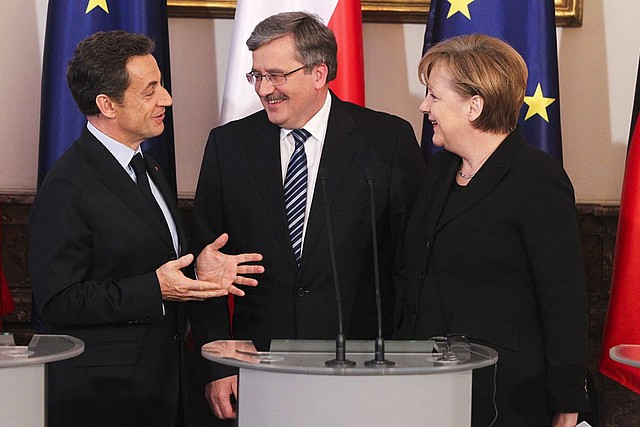
President Bronisław Komorowski with Angela Merkel and Nicolas Sarkozy (2011)

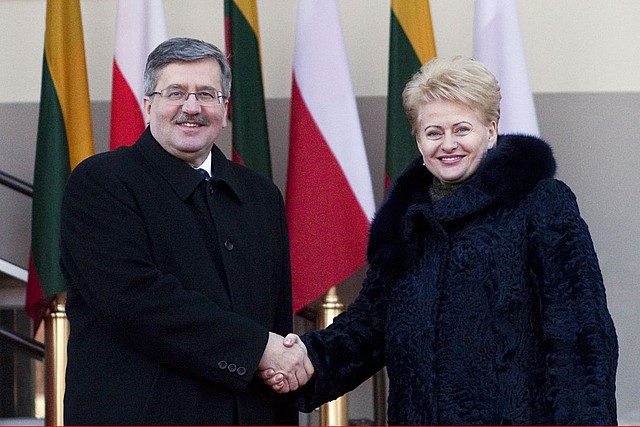
President Bronisław Komorowski with Dalia Grybauskaitė (2011)

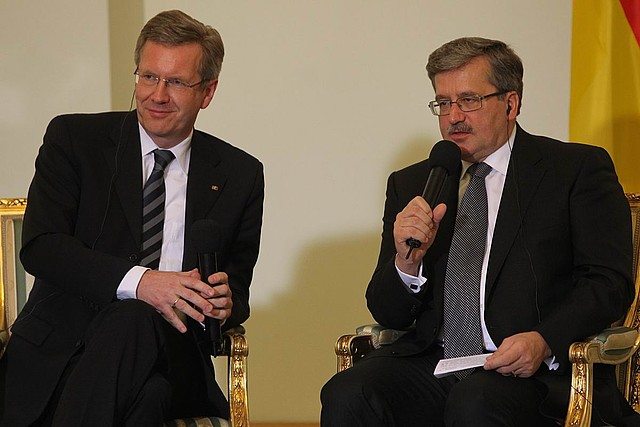
President Bronisław Komorowski with Christian Wulff (2010)

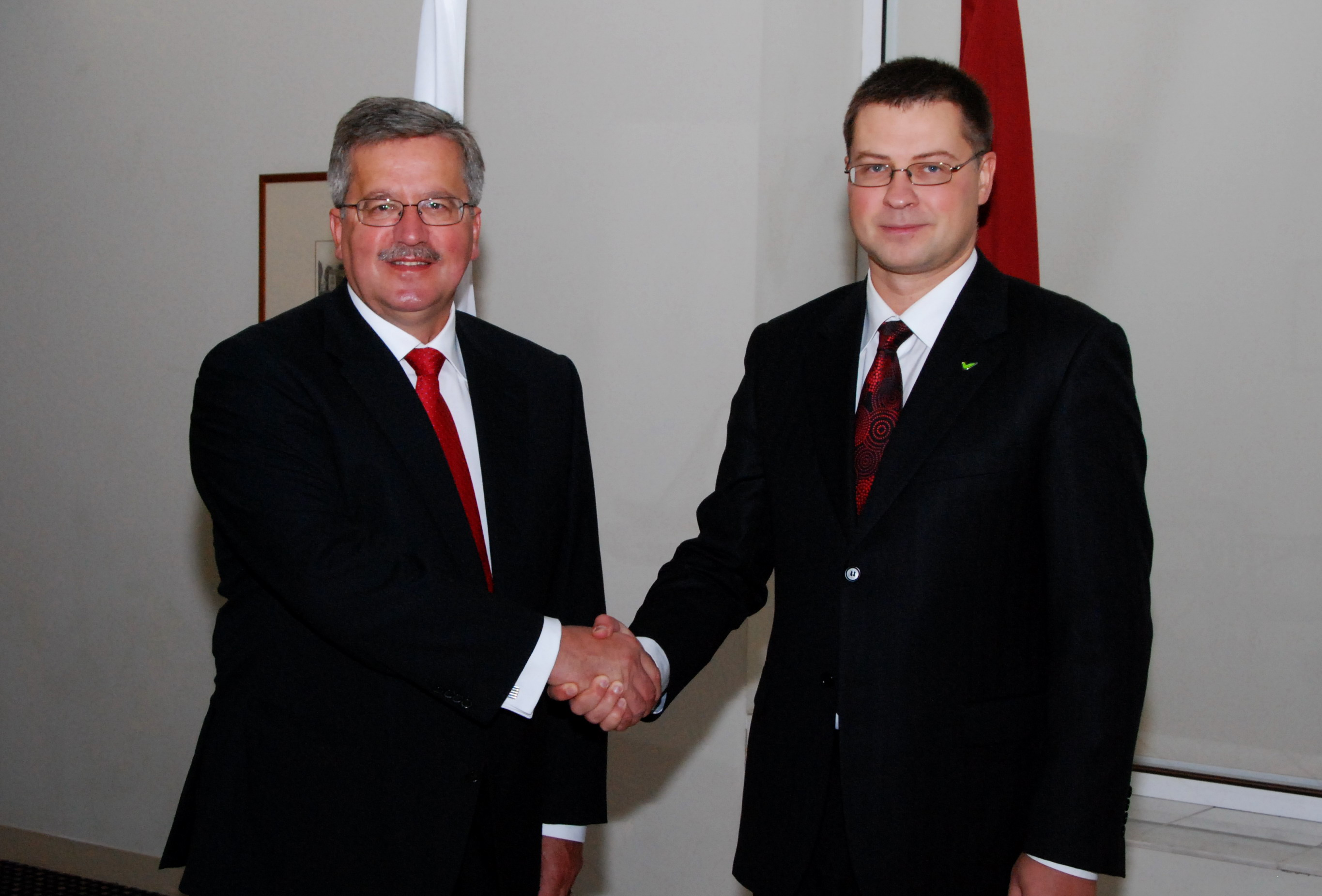
President Bronisław Komorowski with Valdis Dombrovskis (2010)

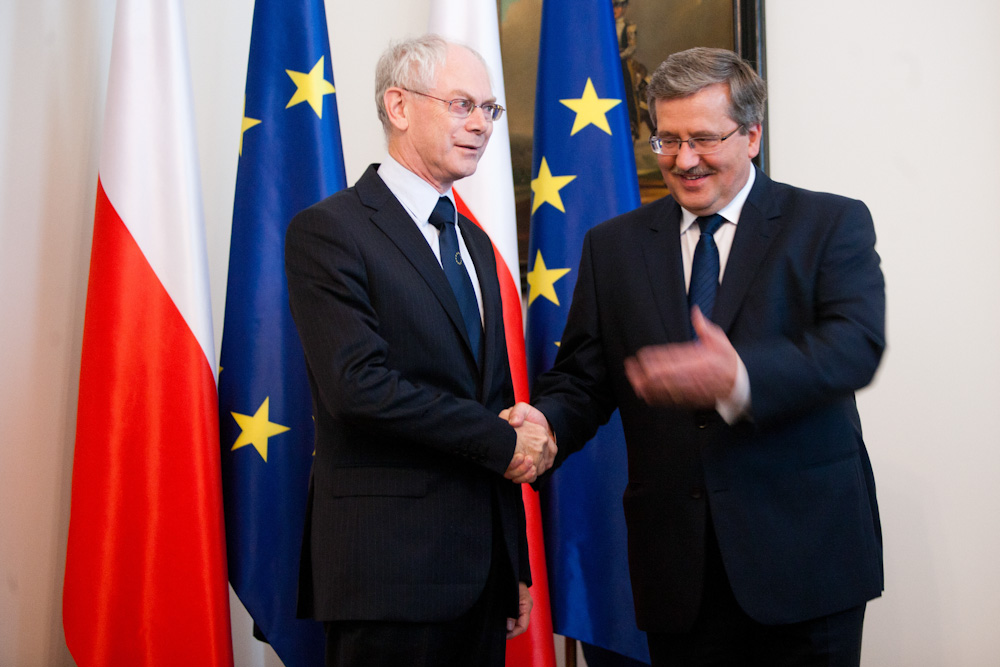
President Bronisław Komorowski with Herman Van Rompuy (2011)

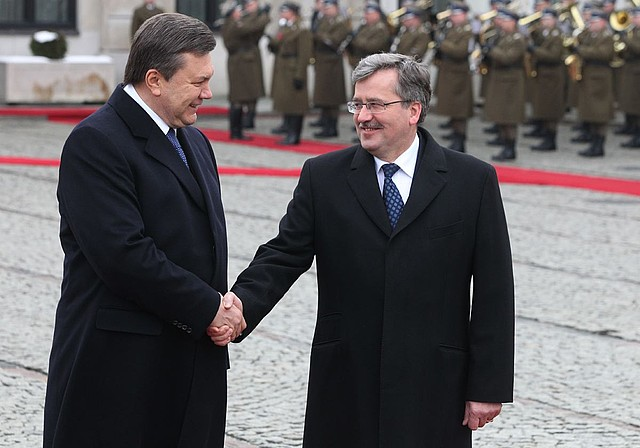
President Bronisław Komorowski with Viktor Yanukovych (2011)

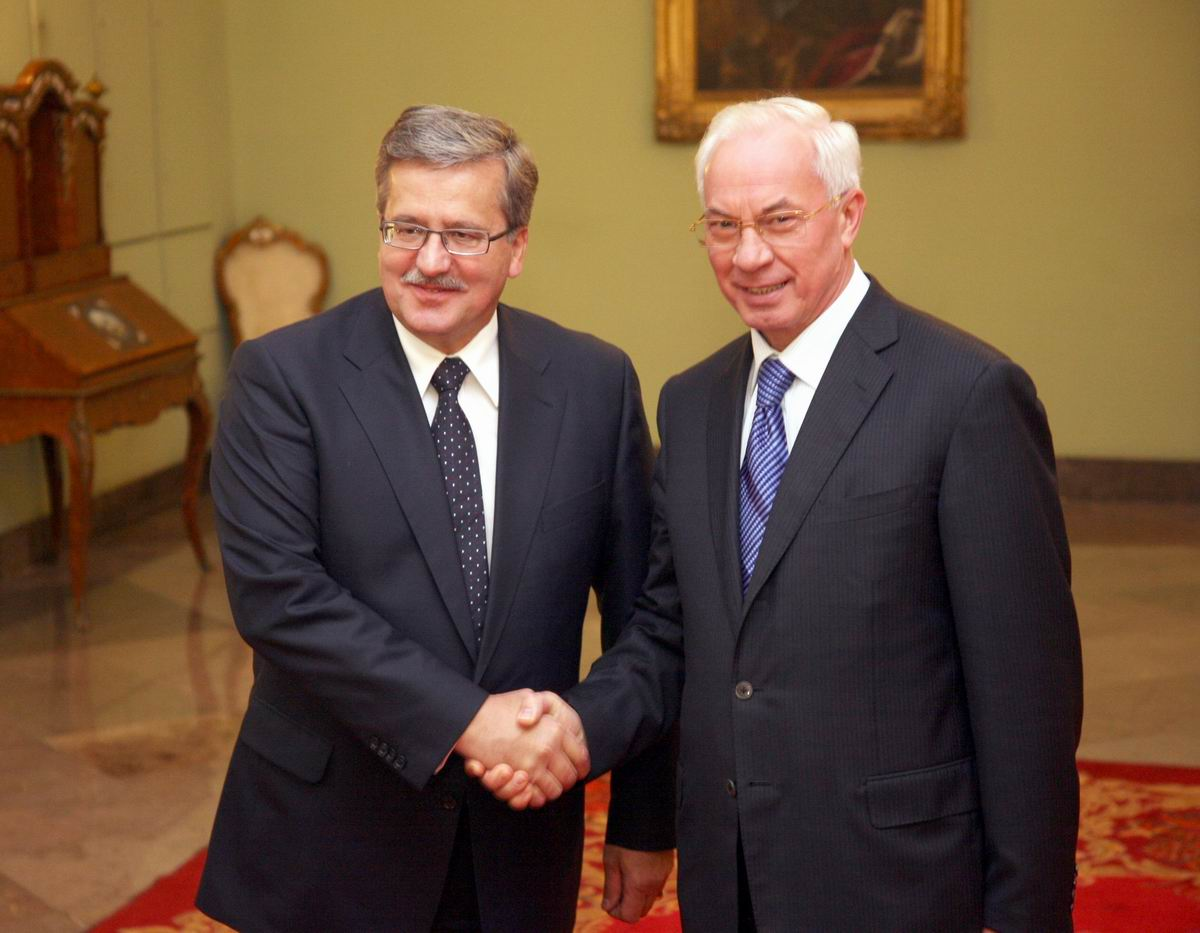
President Bronisław Komorowski with Mykola Azarov (2010)

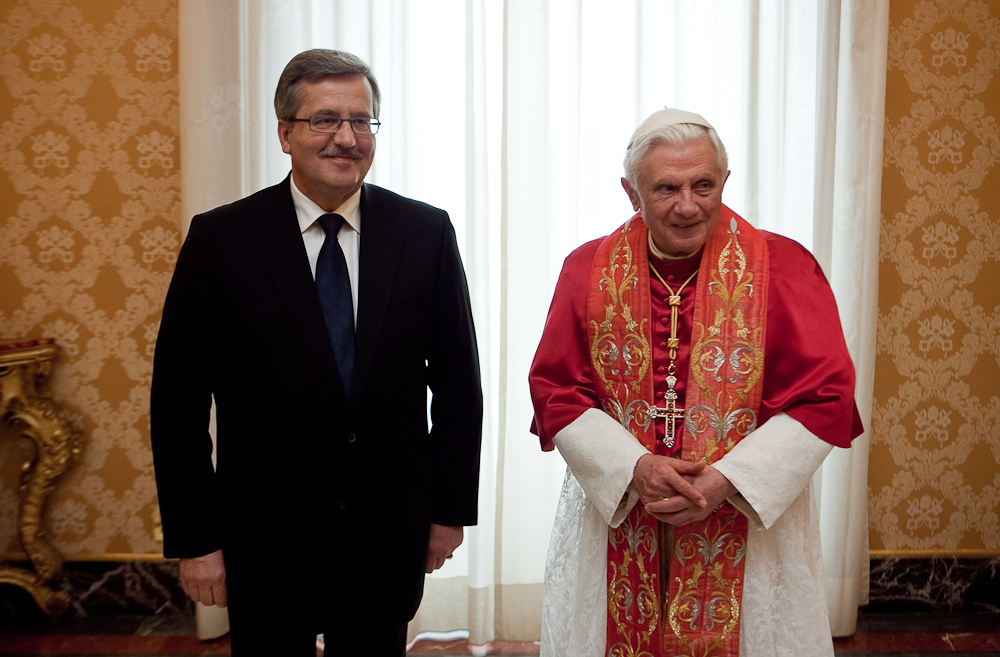
President Bronisław Komorowski with Pope Benedict XVI (2010)

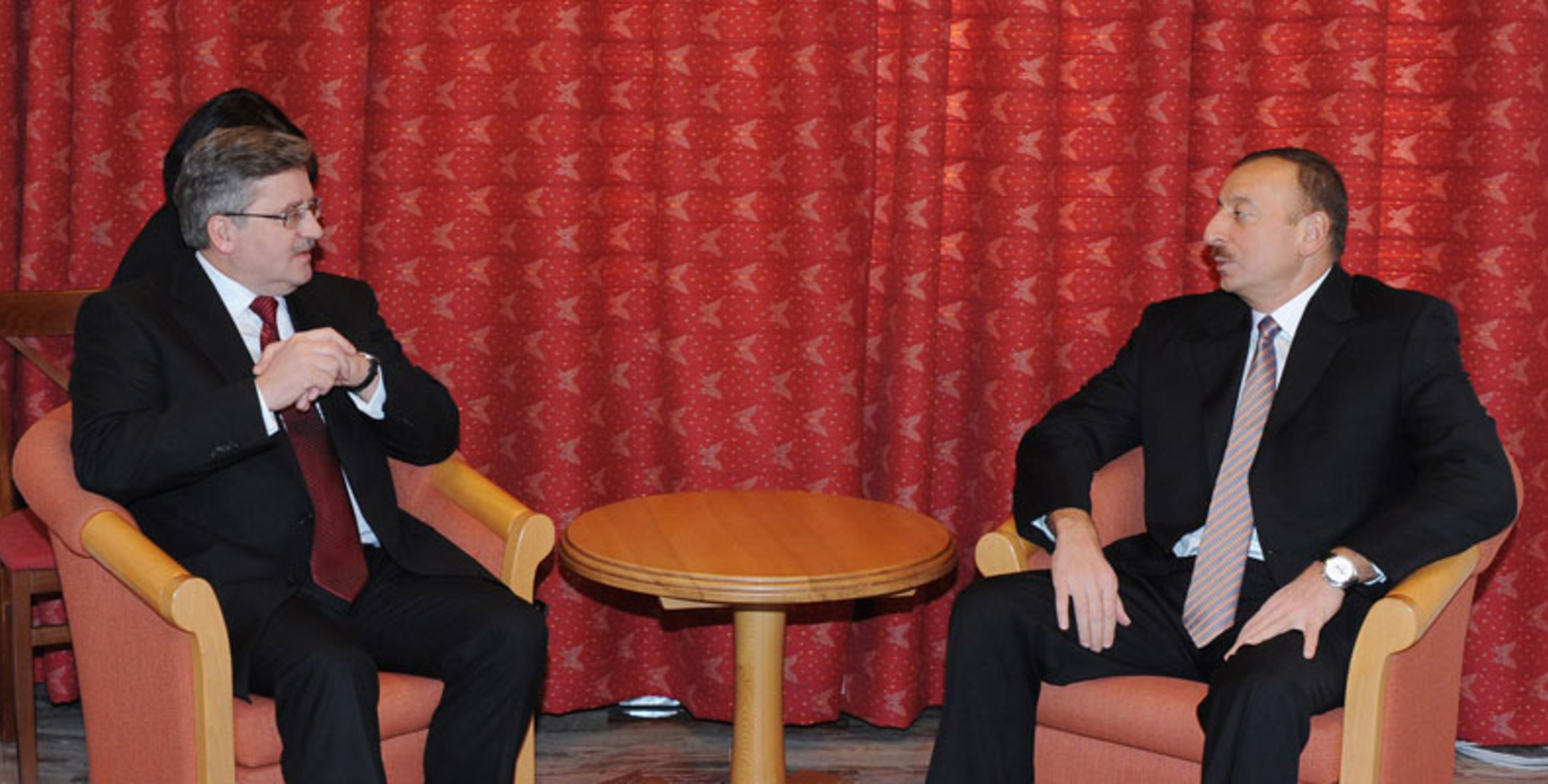
President Bronisław Komorowski with Ilham Aliyev (2011)

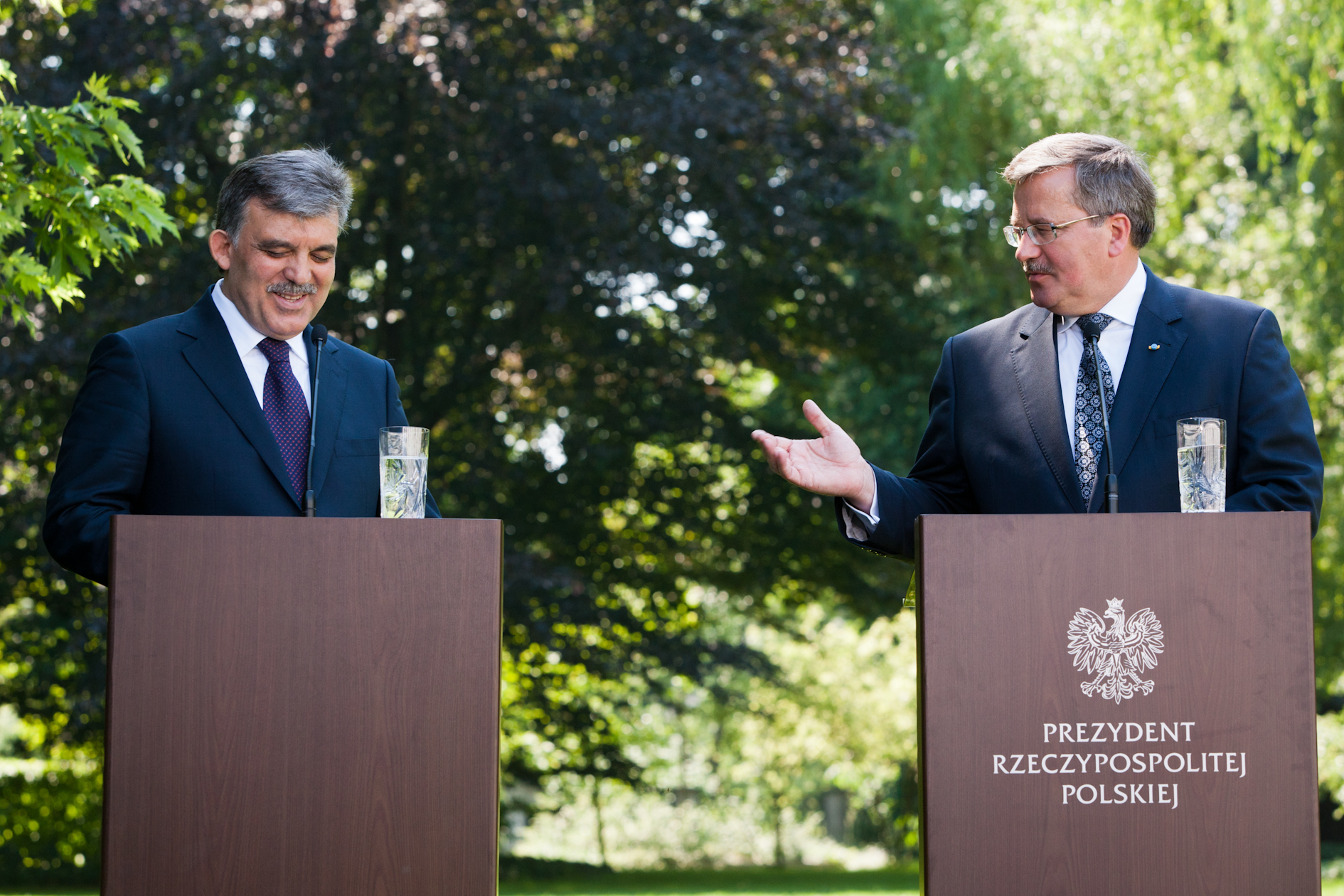
President Bronisław Komorowski with Abdullah Gül (2011)

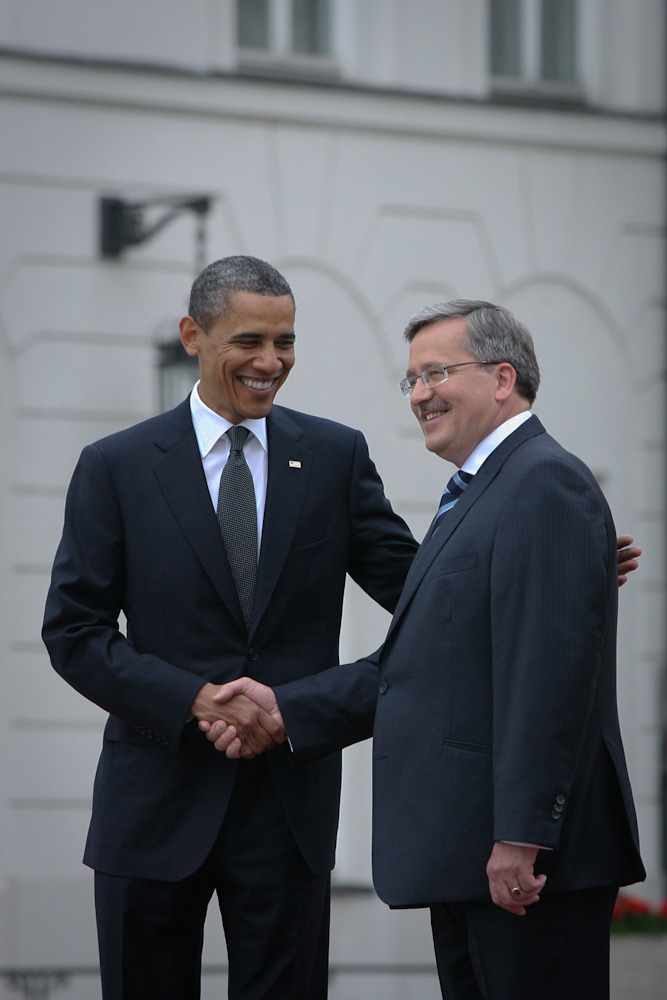
President Bronisław Komorowski with Barack Obama (Warsaw, 2011)

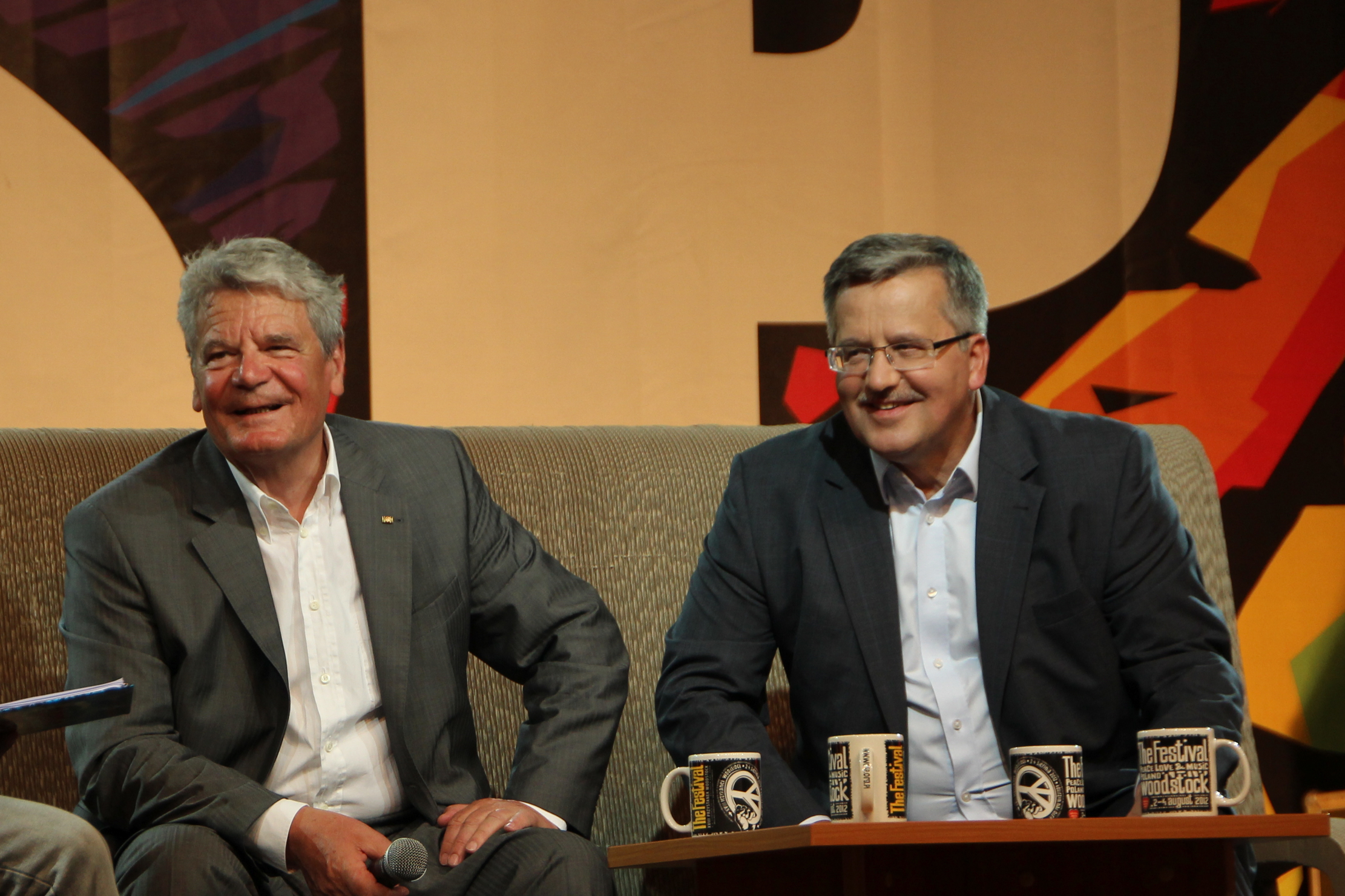
President Bronisław Komorowski with Joachim Gauck (2012)

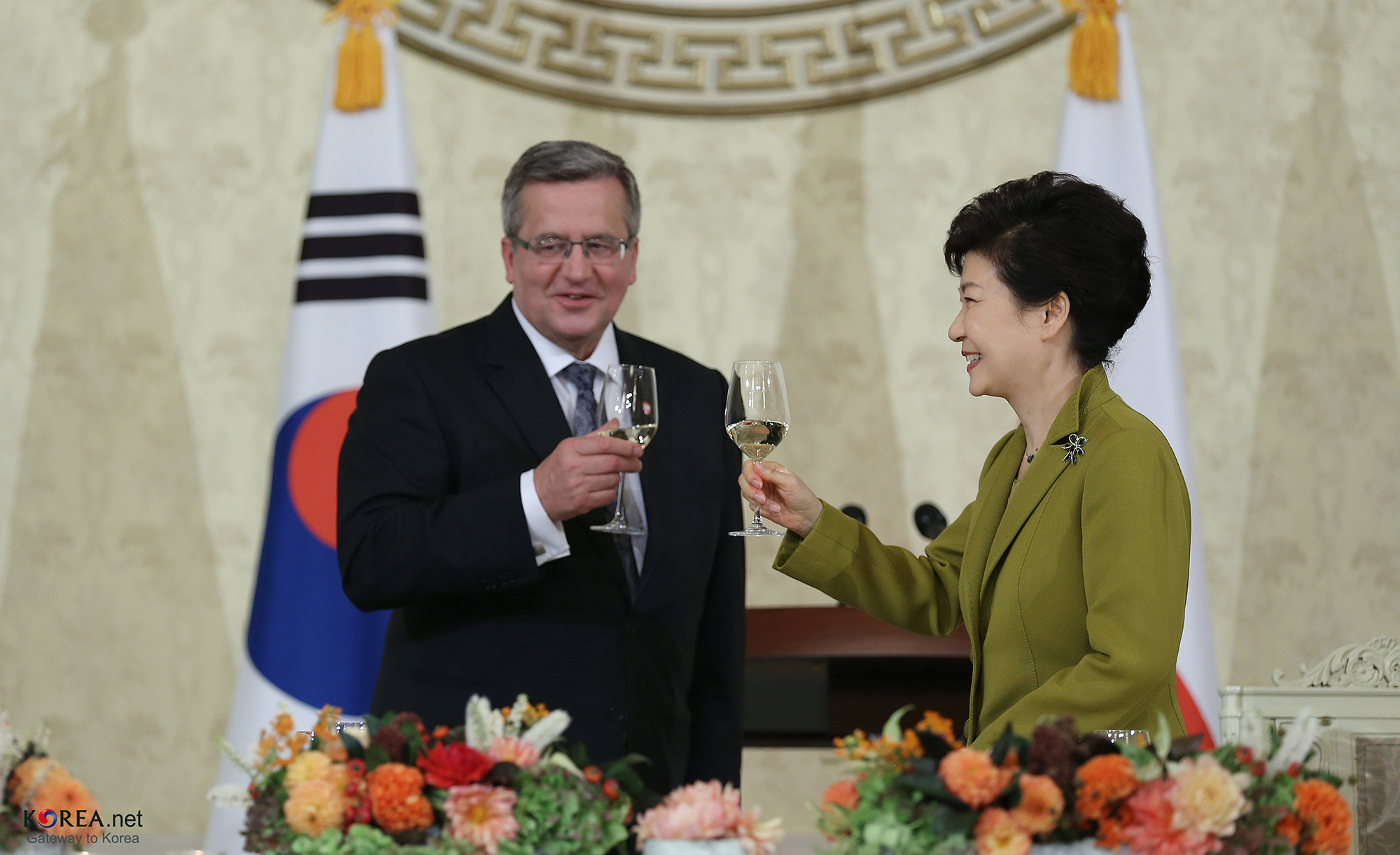
President Bronisław Komorowski with Park Geun-hye (2013)

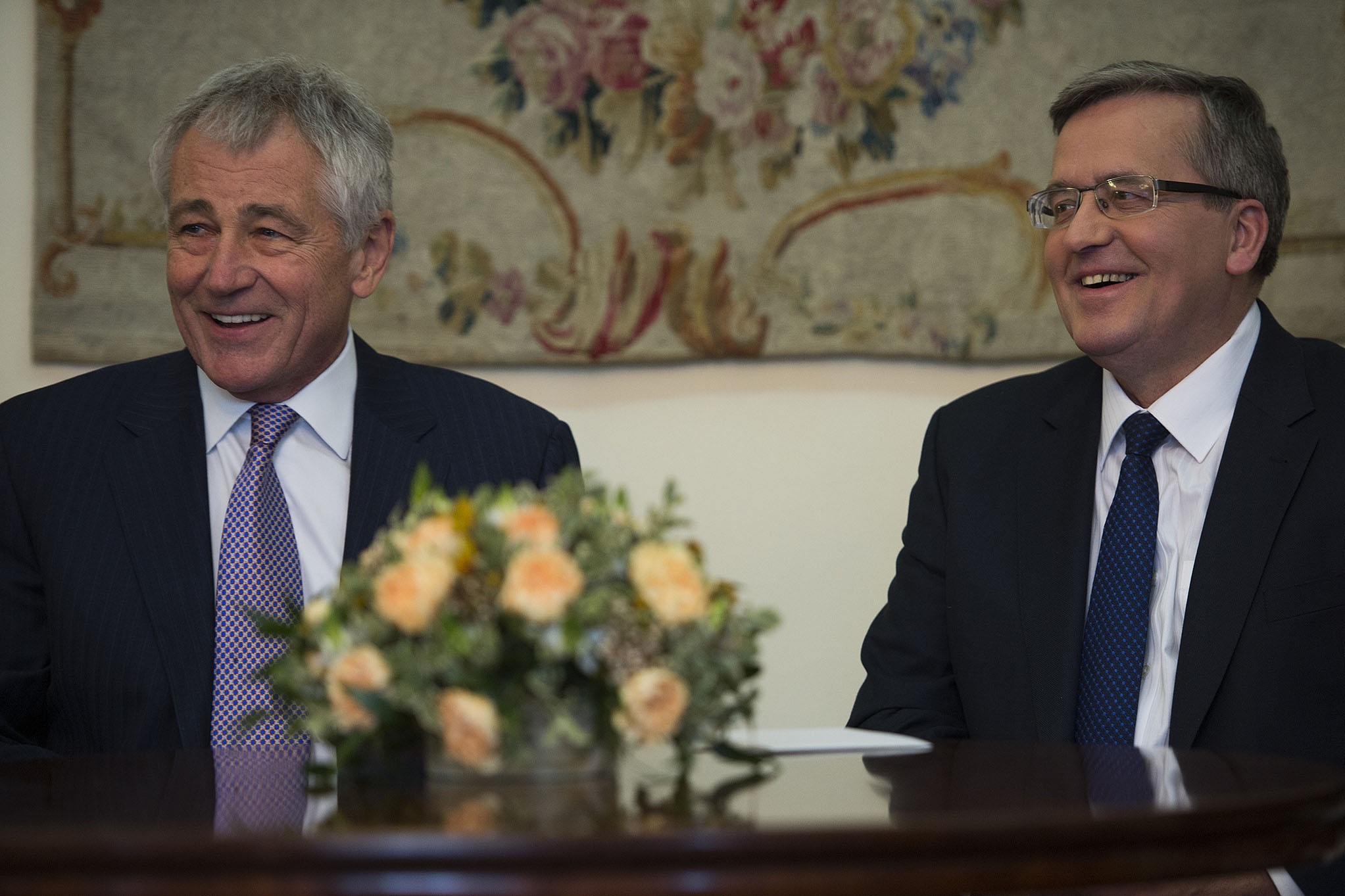
President Bronisław Komorowski with Chuck Hagel (2014)

== Notes ==
Political offices
| Preceded by Janusz Onyszkiewicz | Minister of National Defence; 2000 – 2001 | Succeeded by Jerzy Szmajdziński |
| Preceded by Ludwik Dorn | Marshal of the Sejm; 2007 – 2010 | Succeeded by Grzegorz Schetyna |
| Preceded by Lech Kaczyński; President | Acting President of Poland; 2010 | Succeeded by Bogdan Borusewicz; Acting |
| Preceded by Grzegorz Schetyna; Acting | President of Poland; 2010 – 2015 | Succeeded by Andrzej Duda |
