= Konrad Kornatowski =

Polish lawyer and policeman (born 1957)

Konrad Kornatowski (born 16 July 1957) is a Polish lawyer (prosecutor) and policeman; from 12 February to 8 August Polish Chief of Police. On 9 August 2007 he resigned as Poland's Chief of Police in protest of the sacking on the same day of Interior Minister Janusz Kaczmarek.

On 30 August 2007 Kornatowski was detained and publicly accused of obstruction of justice. The charges against Kornatowski initially were widely regarded in the Polish press and by politicians as nothing more than a political dirty trick intended to block Kornatowski's scheduled testimony before parliament about the present Polish government's secret program of wiretapping opposition politicians. Kornatowski's arrest, took place one day prior to his testimony, which was cancelled because of his detention. On 31 August 2007 Kornatowski was released on bail. Prosecutors presented to him charges of hampering the investigation and urging to false testimonies. At the press conference on 31 August prosecutors presented several pieces of evidence supporting the credibility of these charges.

Former Interior Minister Kaczmarek was arrested at the same time as Kornatowski on 30 August, and also released on 31 August. On 6 September 2007 a Warsaw criminal court judge declared the arrest of Kaczmarek to have been irregular and even illegal. Contrary to this, the same court on 10 October decided that the arrests of Kornatowski and Netzel were legal and regular.
