= Smoktunowicz =

Smoktunowicz is a Polish surname. Notable people with this name include:

- Agata Smoktunowicz (born 1973), Polish mathematician
- Hanna Smoktunowicz (born 1970), Polish television journalist
- Robert Smoktunowicz (1962–2024), Polish politician
