= Stowięcino =

- Village
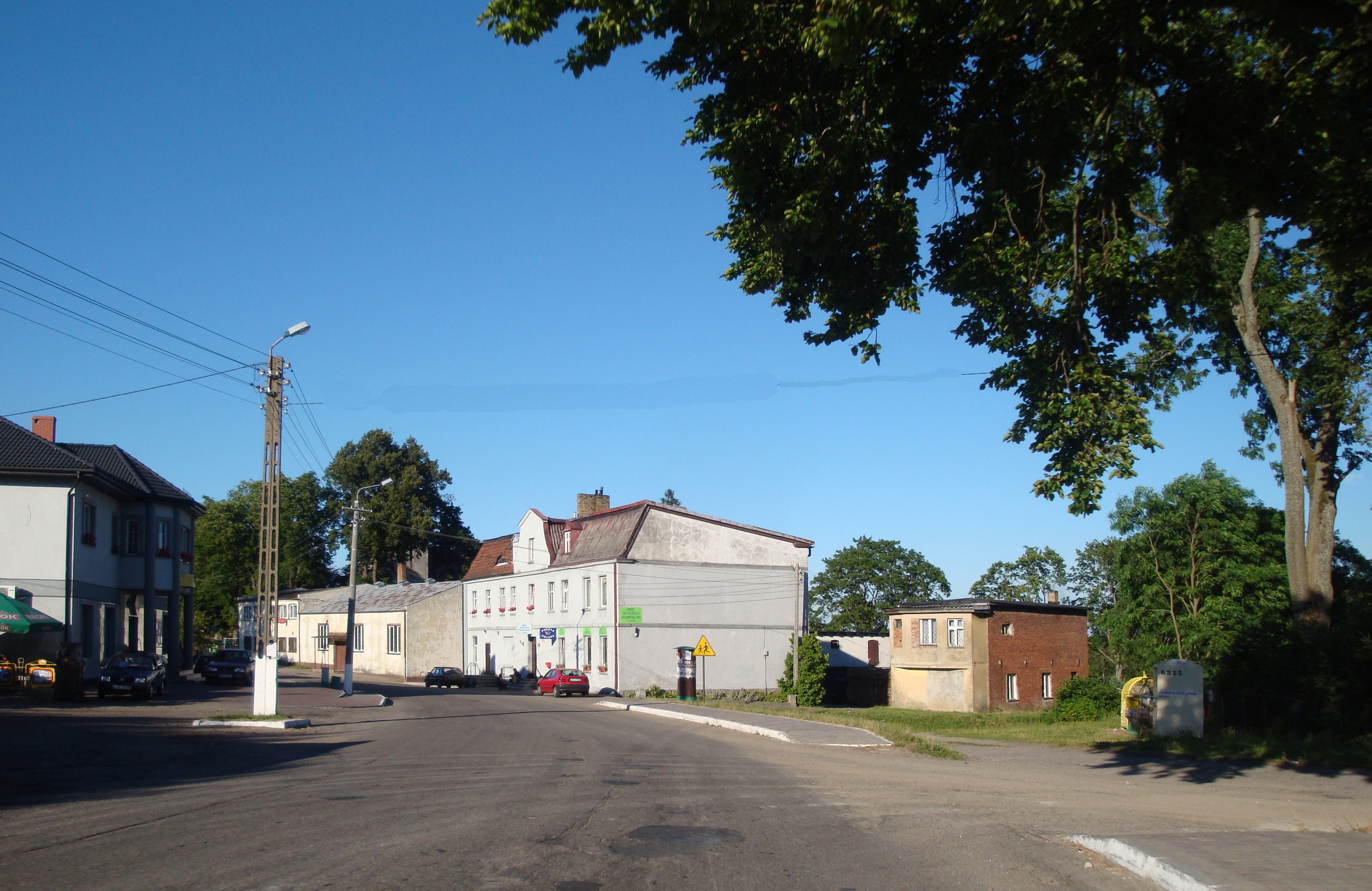

- Location within Poland
- Coordinates: 54°33′48″N 17°29′3″E
- Country: Poland
- Voivodeship: Pomeranian
- County: Słupsk
- Gmina: Główczyce
- Population: 416

Stowięcino [stɔvjɛɲˈt͡ɕinɔ] (German: Stojentin) is a village in the administrative district of Gmina Główczyce, within Słupsk County, Pomeranian Voivodeship, in northern Poland.

== History ==
The noble family of von Stojentin originates from the village which was mentioned in 1341 as the property of Bertold and Matzen van Stoyentin, in 1379 as property of Mertin and Barteke von Stoguntin and in 1402 as property of the olde Bartke van Stoyentyn. A church was first mentioned in 1519, it became Lutheran throughout the Protestant Reformation.

The estate was still in the possession of the Stojentin family in 1618 but was mentioned as property of Jürgen Ludwig von Wobeser's widow in 1732. The von Wobesers remained owners of the Stojentin estate until 1820, when it was handed over to Heinrich Jesco von Puttkamer. In 1853 it was bought by Ferdinand Scheunemann, whose family would own the manor until 1945.

In 1925, 16 inhabitants were Catholics, 6 Jewish. In 1933 the village had 500, in 1939 475 inhabitants.

Throughout the East Pomeranian Offensive the village was occupied by Soviet forces on 9 March 1945, it had not been evacuated before and many inhabitants and refugees from surrounding villages were killed. The last owner of the estate, Mrs. Scheunemann, was killed by Soviet soldiers on 27 March 1945.

After World War II the town again became part of Poland, under territorial changes demanded by the Soviet Union at the Potsdam Conference. Poles expelled from Polish areas annexed by the Soviet Union started to settle in the area. The remaining German populace was expelled in a transport on 27 November 1946 heading to Torgau.

== Notable residents ==
- Andrzej Lepper (1954–2011), founder of the Polish political party Samoobrona (Self-defence).
