= Marek Jurek =

Polish politician (born 1960)

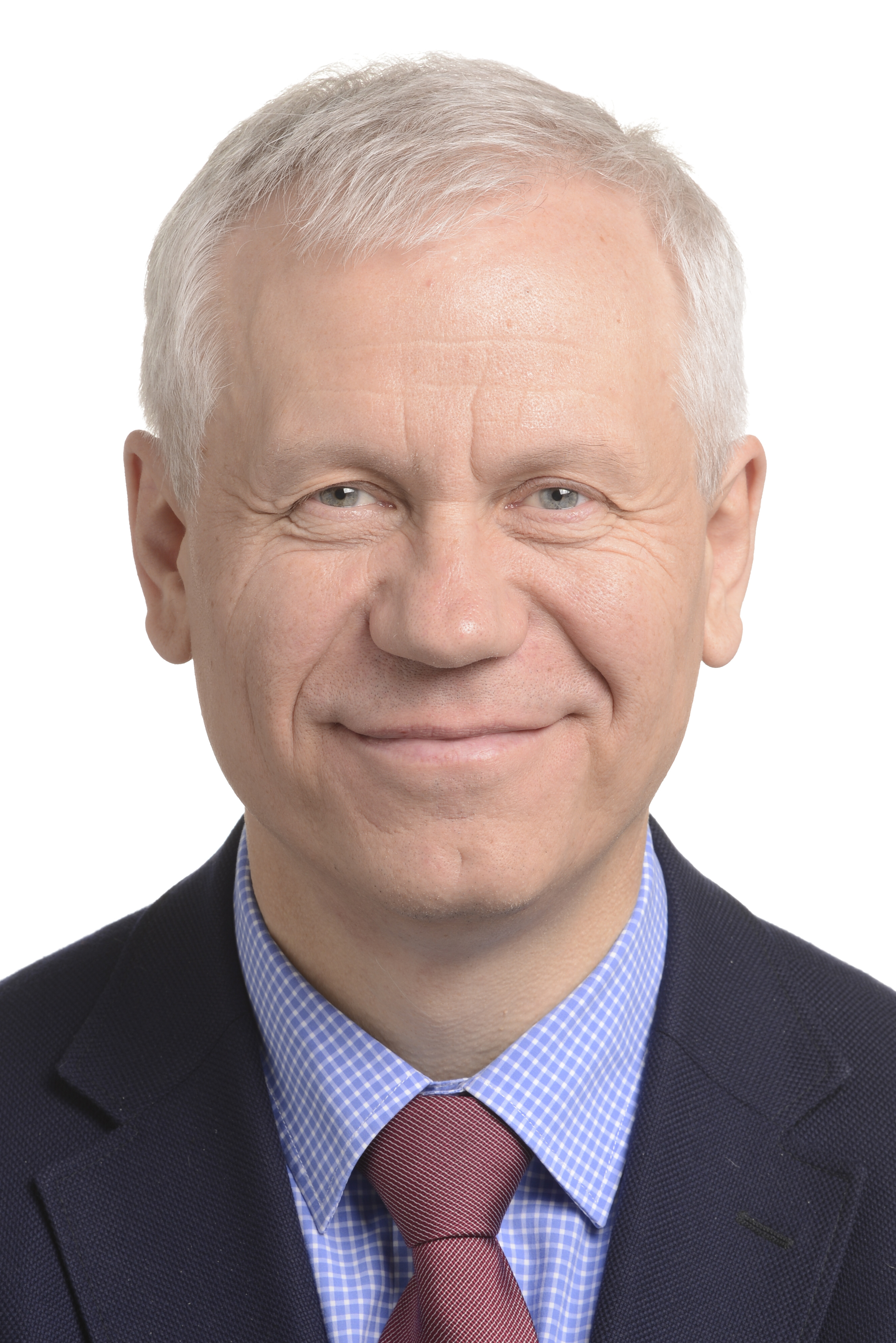
- Official portrait, 2014

Marshal of the Sejm
- In office 26 October 2005 – 27 April 2007
- Preceded by: Włodzimierz Cimoszewicz
- Succeeded by: Ludwik Dorn

Member of the European Parliament
- In office 1 July 2014 – 1 July 2019

Personal details
- Born: 28 June 1960 (age 66) Gorzów Wielkopolski, Poland
- Party: Right Wing of the Republic
- Spouse: Izabela Jurek
- Children: 4
- Profession: Historian
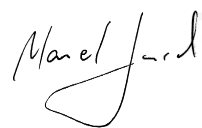
- Signature

Marek Jurek (Note: Polish pronunciation: [ˈmarɛk ˈjurɛk]) (born 28 June 1960 in Gorzów Wielkopolski, Poland) is a right-wing politician who was Marshal of the Sejm and Member of the European Parliament. Since 20 April 2007 he has been the leader of the aspirant party Right of the Republic. Politically, he is most known for being a Marshal of the Sejm in the years 2005–2007.

== Biography ==
He is a graduate in history from Adam Mickiewicz University in Poznań. In the 1980s he was an activist in the anti-communist movement in Poland. After the fall of the communism in 1989, he was one of the founders of the now defunct political party Christian National Union. He was a deputy in the Contract Sejm and later in the Sejm of the Republic of Poland from 1991 to 1993.

From 1995 to 2001 he was a member of the National Broadcasting Council.

In 2001, he was elected a deputy of the Sejm again, this time as a member of the Law and Justice party. On 26 October 2005 he was elected a Sejm marshal (parliament speaker) nominated by Law and Justice with 265 votes (133 votes were given to Bronisław Komorowski from Civic Platform). On 13 April 2007 he resigned from the post, following the Sejm's failure to amend the Constitution to protect prenatal life. On the following day, he left Law and Justice to found his own party, now known as the Right of the Republic. His resignation was accepted on 27 April 2007.

In the parliamentary election in 2007 his party did not win any seats in the Parliament as it found itself below the election threshold. On 22 June 2008 Marek Jurek took part in a by-election to the Senate, held in Krosno-constituency following the death of Senator Andrzej Mazurkiewicz. With 10 751 votes, he gained the third place after the winner Stanisław Zając (Law and Justice) and Maciej Lewicki (Civic Platform). As there was only one seat available in the Senate, Marek Jurek remains outside the Parliament.

On 27 September 2009, Jurek was awarded the Commander's Cross of the Order of Polonia Restituta for outstanding contribution to the independence of Polish Republic, for activities on behalf of democratic change, for achievements in undertaken for the benefit of the country and social work.

He was one of the candidates in the 2010 Polish presidential election, but received only 1.06% of votes and failed to get into the second round. In 2014 he was elected to the European Parliament from the lists of Law and Justice, where he served until 2019. From 2020 to 2023 he was part of the program board of the Institute for Legacy of Polish National Thought. He declared his support for Karol Nawrocki in the second round of the 2025 Polish presidential election.

== Political positions ==
Marek Jurek declared full support for the teaching of the Catholic Church as he opposes abortion, euthanasia, same sex unions and in vitro. He supports the traditional family model. He supports the Creighton Model FertilityCare System. Jurek is in favor of bringing the future back to the Polish and European traditions, cultivating a Christian civilization and Latin culture. He is a supporter of the "Tridentine Rite".

Political offices
Preceded by Włodzimierz Cimoszewicz	Marshal of the Sejm; 2005–2007	Succeeded by Ludwik Dorn
