= Andrzej Mazurkiewicz (politician) =

Polish politician (1963–2008)

Andrzej Tadeusz Mazurkiewicz
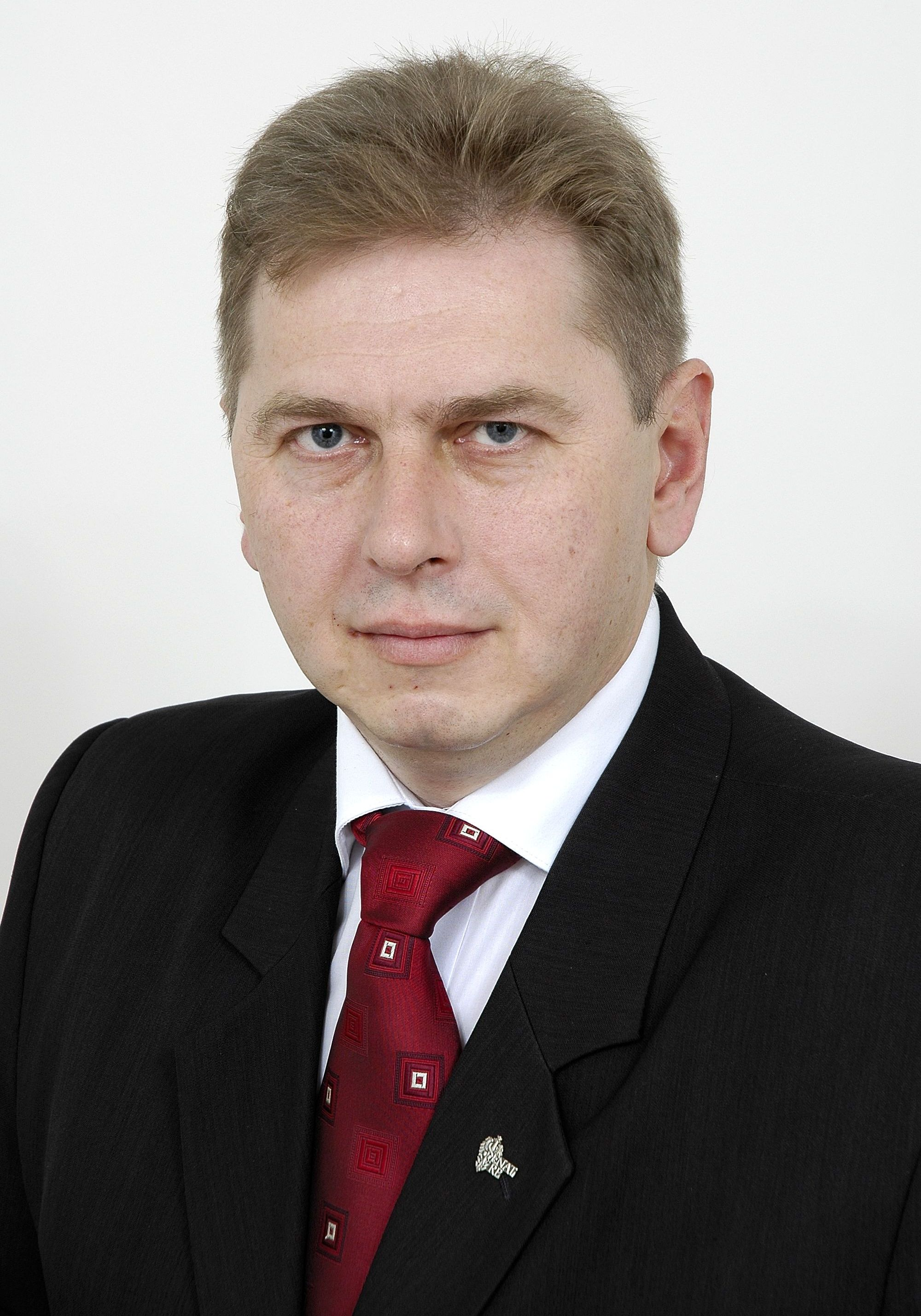

Member of the Senate
- In office 2005 – 2008
- Succeeded by: Stanisław Zając
- Constituency: 21 Krosno
- In office 1997 – 2001
- Constituency: Przemyśl

Deputy of the I Sejm
- In office 1991 – 1993
- Constituency: 30 Przemyśl

Personal details
- Born: 11 May 1963 Jarosław, Polish People's Republic
- Died: 21 March 2008 (aged 44) Warsaw, Poland
- Party: Law and Justice (since 2005)
- Other political affiliations: AWS (1997–2001); KPN (1991–1993)

Andrzej Tadeusz Mazurkiewicz (born 11 May 1963 in Jarosław; died 21 March 2008 in Warsaw) was a Polish politician.

From 1981 he belonged to the Confederation of Independent Poland. He was an MP for the first independent government between 1991 and 1993, and later a three-time senator (1997–2001 and 2005–2008). He was also the vice-mayor of his hometown Jarosław from 1994 till 1997. After his death he was awarded the Commander's Cross of the Order of Polonia Restituta.
