= Ludwik Dorn =

Polish politician (1954–2022)

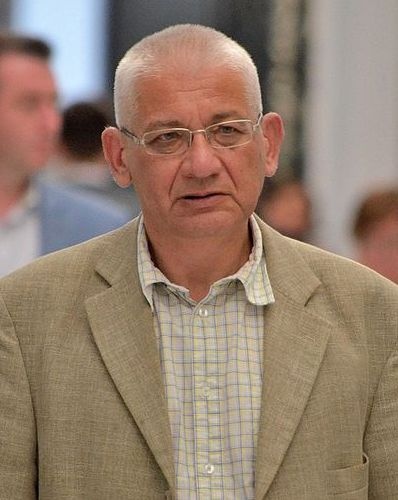
- Dorn in 2014

Marshal of the Sejm
- In office 27 April 2007 – 4 November 2007
- Preceded by: Marek Jurek
- Succeeded by: Bronisław Komorowski

Deputy Prime Minister of Poland
- In office 31 October 2005 – 27 April 2007
- President: Aleksander Kwaśniewski; Lech Kaczyński
- Prime Minister: Kazimierz Marcinkiewicz; Jarosław Kaczyński

Minister of the Interior and Administration
- In office 31 October 2005 – 7 February 2007
- President: Aleksander Kwaśniewski; Lech Kaczyński
- Prime Minister: Kazimierz Marcinkiewicz; Jarosław Kaczyński
- Preceded by: Ryszard Kalisz
- Succeeded by: Janusz Kaczmarek

Personal details
- Born: Ludwik Dornbaum; 5 June 1954 Warsaw, Poland
- Died: 7 April 2022 (aged 67) Warsaw, Poland
- Party: Law and Justice (2001−2008); Poland Plus (2010); Law and Justice (2010−2012); United Poland (2012–2014); Independent (2014–2022)
- Spouse: Izabela Śmieszek
- Profession: Sociologist

Ludwik Stanisław Dorn (Note: Polish pronunciation: [ˈludvʲik ˈdɔrn]) (5 June 1954 – 7 April 2022) was a Polish politician and sociologist who served as Deputy Prime Minister and member of Sejm elected on 5 November 2007.

== Biography ==
Dorn was born Ludwik Dornbaum, to Polish-Jewish parents Henryk Dornbaum (1910–1982), a socialist activist and Alina née Kugler (1915–2006), a doctor. All of his father's family was murdered during the Holocaust.

In the 1960s Dornbaum family changed their name to Dorn. He was raised agnostic, but he converted to Roman Catholicism at the age of 51. Dorn graduated with a degree in sociology from Warsaw University in 1978.

From 31 October 2005 to 7 February 2007 he was Minister of Interior and Administration, resigned after conflict with the Prime Minister Jarosław Kaczyński. Elected a Marshal of the Sejm on 27 April 2007, with 235 votes, after Marek Jurek's resignation.

On 4 November 2011, he, along with 15 other supporters of the dismissed PiS MEP Zbigniew Ziobro, left Law and Justice on ideological grounds to form a breakaway group, United Poland.

Political offices
Title jointly held	Deputy Prime Minister of Poland; 2005–2007	Title jointly held
Preceded by Ryszard Kalisz	Minister of Interior and Administration; 2005–2007	Succeeded by Janusz Kaczmarek
Preceded by Marek Jurek	Marshal of the Sejm; 2007	Succeeded by Bronisław Komorowski
