= Janusz Kaczmarek =

Polish lawyer, prosecutor and politician

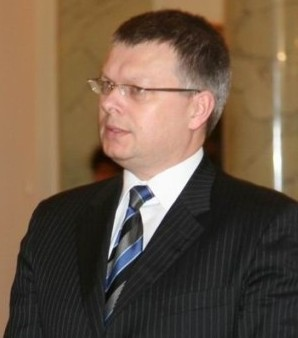

Minister of Interior and Administration
- In office 8 February 2007 – 8 August 2007
- President: Lech Kaczyński
- Prime Minister: Jarosław Kaczyński
- Preceded by: Ludwik Dorn
- Succeeded by: Władysław Stasiak

National Public Prosecutor
- In office 31 October 2005 – 8 February 2007
- Preceded by: Karol Napierski
- Succeeded by: Tomasz Szałek

Personal details
- Born: 25 December 1961 (age 64) Gdynia, Poland
- Profession: prosecutor

Janusz Kazimierz Kaczmarek (born 25 December 1961 in Gdynia) is a Polish lawyer, prosecutor and politician. He was National Public Prosecutor from 31 October 2005 to 8 February 2007, and Polish Minister of Internal Affairs and Administration from 8 February 2007 to 8 August 2007.

He graduated from the Faculty of Law and Administration of the Gdańsk University.

His term as interior minister in Jarosław Kaczyński's cabinet ended abruptly when he was dismissed because the accusations of warning Andrzej Lepper about an impending action of the Central Anticorruption Bureau action. Since then Kaczmarek has repeatedly criticized the government, especially Justice Minister Zbigniew Ziobro.

On 30 August 2007 Kaczmarek was detained for 48 hours on allegations of hampering the investigation and submitting false testimonies. Some observers in the Polish press initially regarded this arrest as a political dirty trick intended to silence critics of the Kaczynski government. However, on the press conference on 31 August 2007, prosecutors presented evidence supporting the charges presented to Kaczmarek.

On 6 September 2007 a Warsaw criminal court declared that the 30 August arrest of Kaczmarek was not necessary and irregularly made, although did not undermine the charges against him.
