= Władysław Stasiak =

Polish politician (1966–2010)

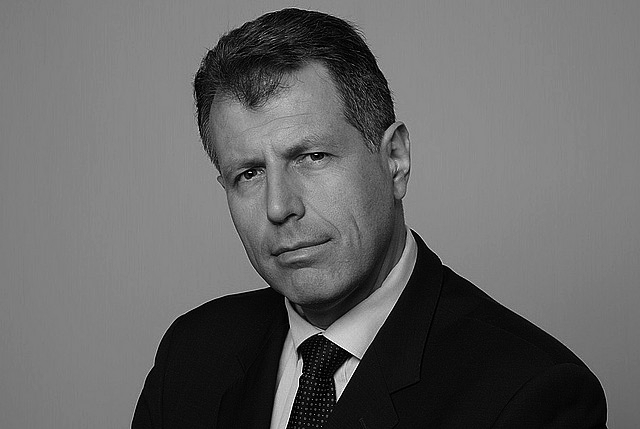
- Stasiak in 2010

Chief of the Chancellery of the President
- In office 27 July 2009 – 10 April 2010
- President: Lech Kaczyński
- Preceded by: Piotr Kownacki
- Succeeded by: Jacek Michałowski

Chief of the National Security Bureau
- In office 19 November 2007 – 15 January 2009
- In office 24 August 2006 – 8 August 2007

Minister of Interior and Administration
- In office 8 August 2007 – 16 November 2007
- Prime Minister: Jarosław Kaczyński
- Preceded by: Janusz Kaczmarek
- Succeeded by: Grzegorz Schetyna

Personal details
- Born: 15 March 1966 Wrocław, Poland
- Died: 10 April 2010 (aged 44) Smolensk, Russia
- Cause of death: Plane crash
- Education: University of Wrocław (1989); KSAP (1993)

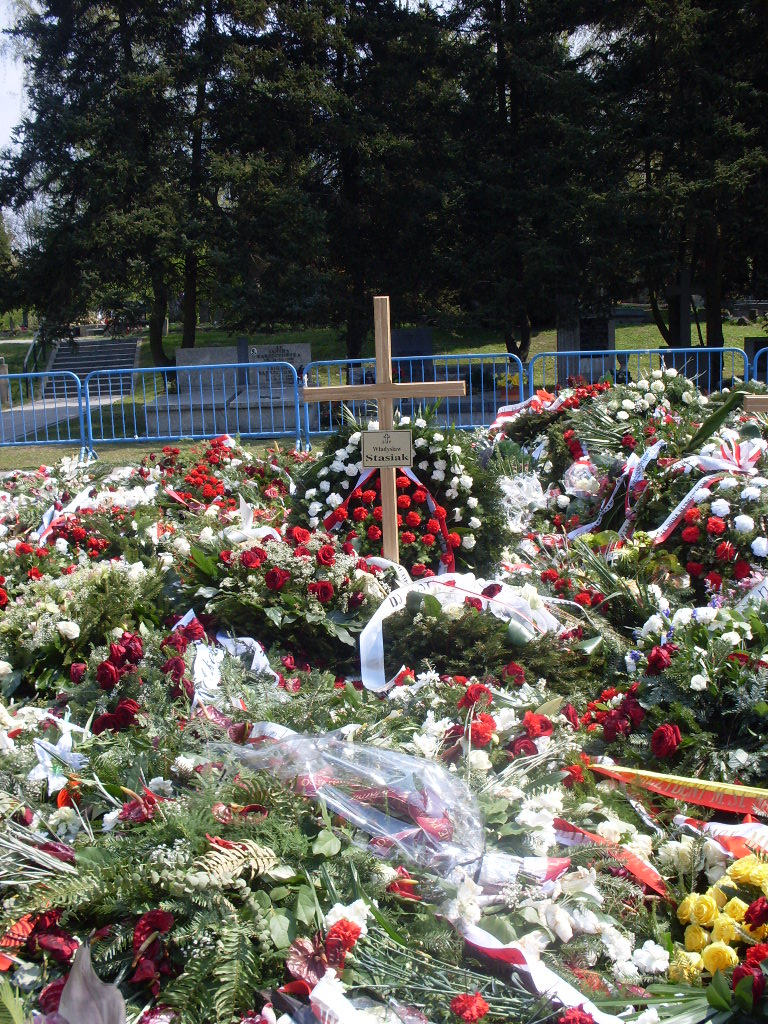
Grave of Władysław Stasiak at Military Powązki Cemetery in Warsaw, after burial

Władysław Augustyn Stasiak (15 March 1966 – 10 April 2010) was a Polish senior state and local government official.

== Biography ==
Władysław Stasiak was born on 15 March 1966 in Wrocław. He finished high school in 1984. In 1989 Stasiak graduated from the University of Wrocław in history. He then studied at the National School of Public Administration between 1991 and 1993.

Since April 1993 Stasiak had worked in the Supreme Audit Office, which was then led by Lech Kaczyński. After Kaczyński won Warsaw mayoral election in November 2002, Stasiak became his deputy, being responsible for public safety and administration.

He had served as the chief of the National Security Bureau since 24 August 2006 under the presidency of Lech Kaczyński, until on 8 August 2007 he was appointed Minister of Interior and Administration in the Jarosław Kaczyński cabinet. Stasiak left the office only two months later on 16 November 2007, as the new government was sworn in.

On 19 November he again became chief of the National Security Bureau and served until 15 January 2009. Then he worked as the deputy chief of the Presidential Chancellery of Lech Kaczyński, until he was elevated to chief on 27 July 2009.

Stasiak died in the fatal presidential plane crash on 10 April 2010 near Smolensk in Russia.

== Honours and awards ==
- Grand Cross of the Order of Merit (Portugal, September 2008)
- Commander's Cross of the Order of Merit of the Republic of Hungary (19 March 2009)
- Commander's Cross with Star of the Order of Polonia Restituta (posthumously, 16 April 2010)
- Honorary Citizen of Wrocław (20 May 2010)
- Merit for the City of Warsaw (9 September 2010)
- Honorary Citizen of Lower Silesia (9 September 2010)
