= Robert Smoktunowicz =

Polish politician (1962–2024)

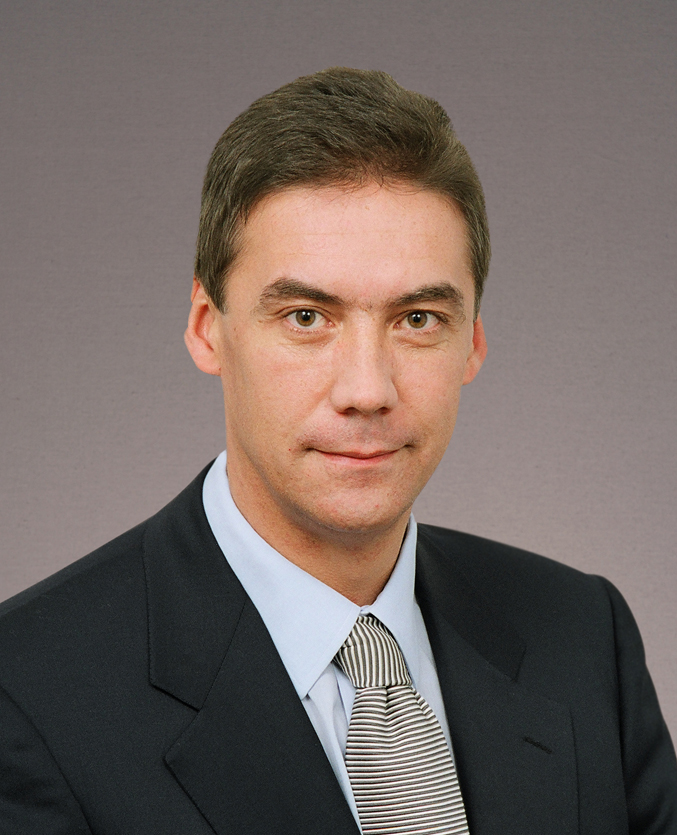
Robert Smoktunowicz

Robert Maciej Smoktunowicz (pronounced [ˈrɔbɛrt smɔktuˈnɔvit͡ʂ]; 30 January 1962 – 9 September 2024) was a Polish politician. He represented Civic Platform (PO) in the Senate from 2001 to 2007. He gave up the membership in PO on 17 September 2007. Later that year he ran for re-election to the Polish Senate from the Left and Democrats list but to no avail. Smoktunowicz died on 9 September 2024, at the age of 62.
