= Self-Defence Rebirth of Andrzej Lepper =

Self-Defence Rebirth of Andrzej Lepper Samoobrona Odrodzenie Andrzeja Leppera
- Abbreviation: SO
- Leader: Jerzy Andrzejewski
- Vice deputy: Bogdan Gasiński
- Founded: 8 January 2025
- Registered: 8 May 2025
- Headquarters: 20-412 Lublin, Kunickiego 48
- Ideology: Agrarian socialism Left-wing nationalism
- Political position: Left-wing
- Colours: Red
- Slogan: Poland for Poles (Polish: Polska dla Polaków)
- Sejm: 0 / 460
- Senate: 0 / 100
- European Parliament: 0 / 51
- Regional assemblies: 0 / 552
- City presidents: 0 / 117

Website
- samoobrona-odrodzenie.pl

Self-Defence Rebirth of Andrzej Lepper (Polish: Samoobrona Odrodzenie Andrzeja Leppera, SO), also known as Self-Defence Rebirth - Poland for Poles (Polish: Samoobrona Odrodzenie – Polska Dla Polaków), or just Self-Defence Rebirth (Polish: Samoobrona Odrodzenie), is a political party in Poland. The party aims to be the successor of Self-Defence of the Republic of Poland; it was founded in January 2025 by the members of the pro-Russian Polish Anti-War Movement (Polish: Polski Ruch Antywojenny) Jerzy Andrzejewski and Piotr Panasiuk, as well as former Self-Defence members Marian Sołyga and Bogdan Gasiński.

Following its registration in May 2025, the party is one of three parties active in Poland that call themselves Samoobrona. Its political program and postulates mimic those of original Samoobrona. It it also described as pro-Russian. In May 2026, the party sparked controversy by publishing a generative AI video of Andrzej Lepper (who died in 2011) endorsing the party and stating that he was murdered. Despite heavy criticism, the party defended the video and its use of AI. The party has been actively promoting the claim that Lepper was murdered, declaring that it is in possession of evidence that confirms this thesis.

== History ==
=== Early activity ===
Self-Defence of the Republic of Poland and its leader, Andrzej Lepper, who died in 2011, have gained a legendary status in Polish politics, with mainstream parties and politicians referencing Lepper, claiming that his death was not a suicide but a murder, calling for new investigations into his death, and lastly launching initiatives to build a monument of his. According to Rzeczpospolita, interest in Lepper and Samoobrona has increased in the 2020s. In 2024, the founders of the Polish Anti-War Movement, Jerzy Andrzejewski and Piotr Panasiuk, decided to find a party based on Samoobrona together with former Samoobrona member Marian Sołyga.

In December 2024 in Lublin, the founding meeting of the party took place. In January 2025, the party started the registration process. On 3 April 2025, Self-Defence Rebirth partook in a protest organized by Igor Stachowiak Foundation and families of police brutality victims, which culminated in a meeting with the Justice Minister Adam Bodnar. On 6 April 2025, the party presented its party statute, and was then formally registered on 8 May. In June 2025, the party filed a complaint to prosecutor's office against Jarosław Stawiarski, accusing him of abuse of power; similar complaint was filed by Civic Coalition MP Marta Wcisło.

=== AI video scandal ===
AI-generated video of Andrzej Lepper (1954-2011) promoting the party, published by the party's vice deputy Bogdan Gasiński.

In May 2026, the party published a video made by a generative AI text-to-video model of Andrzej Lepper standing in a wheat field and holding an ear of wheat in his hand. The video was published by Bogdan Gasiński, the vice deputy of Self-Defence Rebirth. In this video, Lepper's voice states:

I was murdered. But that's not the point. I have worthy successors. Support them, self-defence rebirth. Poland for Poles. Only this party can fulfill my goals. I've always trusted such people. And as for PiS, we'll find you!

The video sparked controversy, given that Lepper died in 2011 and the party used his image for self-promotion and for spreading the claim that his death was a murder. The party was accused of showing a lack of respect to its political patron, "desecrating" him, and "spitting on his grave". The leader of the party, Jerzy Andrzejewski, defended the video, stating: "This is a way of engaging voters. This is what political PR looks like these days. Everyone knows that Andrzej Lepper is dead, so this cannot be regarded as misleading."

The video and its implications have been heavily discussed in Polish media. Spider’s Web wrote an article on the incident urging Polish voters to "stop this madness" and arguing that it is a sign of "AI era in politics". Radio Kraków described the video as "pure necromarketing", claiming: "Today we have a digital Lepper in a field of corn. Tomorrow we’ll be presented with a newly discovered recording of some politician or other saying terrible things." Polish Press presented the video as the main example of "slopaganda", discussing the usage of AI in politics that was made prominent by Donald Trump and since then also made its way into Polish politics.

Some Polish media also questioned the legality of the video, while the Demagog Association warned that the video was not labelled as AI and could mislead voters. Ultimately, this event contributed to the Polish government decision to implement AI Act, which obligates content creators, companies, and policians to explicitly label materials created with the help of artificial intelligence, with failure to do so resulting in a fine.

=== Later activities ===
In May 2026, party leadership attended Victory Day celebrations organized by the Russian embassy in Warsaw and Russian ambassador to Poland Gieorgij Michno. This event was attended by other pro-Russian activists and parties in Poland, such as Krzysztof Tołwiński of Front, Mateusz Piskorski and Tomasz Jankowski of Zmiana, and Włodzimierz Rynkowski of Slavic Union. A month later, on 11 June, Self-Defence Rebirth also attended Russia Day celebrations organized by the embassy and personally met Michno; the event attracted media attention as it was also attended by Grzegorz Braun and activists of his party, the Confederation of the Polish Crown.

In June 2026, Self-Defence Rebirth also organized a demonstration in front of the Sejm, protesting the 2026 Minab school attack and requesting that the Sejm honors the victims with a minute of silence. In July, the party claimed that it has formulated a system that would provide a systemic solution to the issue of immigration. It requested a meeting with the government of the Lublin Voivodeship, offering to present the plan to it.

In August 2026, the party announced the beginning of its campaign ahead of the parliamentary election expected to take place in 2027. The party's vice deputy Bodgan Gasiński also stated that he talked with Lepper three months before his death, and that Lepper was in possession of recording related to the Podkarpacie scandal, including CCTV footage and phone bills. The party reported the information to prosecutor's office in Lublin. The party emphasized its links with the heritage of Andrzej Lepper and promoted a program based on the original Lepper's party. In September 2026, Self-Defence Rebirth was denounced by Lepper's son, Tomasz Lepper, who asked the party to stop using the name of Self-Defence and emphasized that Lepper's family only recognizes the surviving Samoobrona party (led by Jan Perkowski as of 2026) and the surviving ZZR Samoobrona trade union as legitimate.

== Ideology ==
The party describes itself as "political initiative drawing on the ideas and legacy of Andrzej Lepper — a leader who fought for the rights of ordinary people, farmers and workers." Its stated goal is "the revival of the spirit of Samoobrona as an authentic voice of social opposition to injustice, exclusion and the subordination of national interests to large corporations and foreign influences." Self-Defence Rebirth declares to be committed to promoting Polish sovereignty, the dignity of work, and social justice, emphasizing the need to curb the influence of foreign corporations and stating that “Poland needs the true voice of the people”.

Drawing on the legacy of Andrzej Lepper, who became known as the champion of farmers’ and workers’ interests, Self-Defence Rebirth seeks to focus on combating social exclusion and defending the interests of ordinary citizens against the political elite and large corporations. It follows the ideals of the original Samoobrona party, which consisted of agrarian socialism, left-wing nationalism, left-wing Catholicism, anti-globalism, and anti-capitalism. The party's founder Jerzy Andrzejewski, stated: "People increasingly see that something in our reality is wrong. Roads and cycle paths are being built and foreign companies are building skyscrapers in Warsaw, but at the same time, we have fundamental problems, including depopulation, deindustrialisation and a decline in the level of education, which the government is not solving."

The party claims that Andrzej Lepper, contrary to the official conclusion of the investigation, did not die by suicide, but was instead murdered. Such claims are common in the Polish popular opinion, as his death is commonly regarded as political murder. The party declares that it would take action to further investigate Lepper's death, and also claims to have evidence that confirms Lepper's murder. During the presentation of the party's program in August 2026, its vice deputy Bogdan Gasiński stated:

Andrzej Lepper had been receiving threats and was in possession of recordings relating to the Podkarpacie scandal of 2010–2011, which he had received from a man linked to the Ukrainian security services. We already have confirmed information, including from call records and security camera footage. It is clearly visible there that three men entered the Samoobrona office. These men are linked to a karate association. Not the traditional one in Poland, but other karate associations. I cannot give their surnames, but I can say that these men’s first names are Robert, Krzysztof and Rafał. They went inside, which is why, in our view, they murdered Andrzej Lepper. They must have sedated him, hanged him, and that is how it happened.

On defence, the party postulates increasing the number of bomb shelters and changing the Polish population defence system to be based on the Swiss militia system. Conversely, the party proposes to provide wider access to firearms to those meeting health requirements. At the same time, the party emphasizes its anti-war stance and seeks to prevent conflict. The party stated that while Switzerland has shelters covering for 136% of its population, Polish shelters would only provide space for 4% of its citizens. The party declared that it has a created a system that would provide a "systemic solution" to the issue of immigration.

On foreign policy, the party is considered pro-Russian, similarly to the Polish Anti-War Movement that the party leadership descends from. In 2026, members of Self-Defence Rebirth attended nationalist celebrations organised by the Russian embassy in Poland, including those on Victory Day, as well as on Russia Day. In August 2026, OKO.press noted the party's pro-Russian stance, noting that the party leaders "are regular visitors to the Embassy of the Russian Federation in Warsaw".

== See also ==
- Self-Defence of the Republic of Poland
- Patriotic Self-Defence
- Self-Defence Rebirth
- Self-Defence Social Movement
- Peasants' Party (Poland)
- Party of Regions (Poland)
- Self-Defence of the Polish Nation
