= Self-Defence Social Movement =

Self-Defence Social Movement Samoobrona Ruch Społeczny
- Abbreviation: SRS
- Leader: Sławomir Izdebski (2006); Henryk Dzido (2006-2007)
- Founder: Sławomir Izdebski
- Founded: 28 February 2006
- Registered: 12 March 2006
- Dissolved: 23 July 2007
- Split from: SRP
- Succeeded by: Self-Defence Rebirth
- Headquarters: Aleje Jerozolimskie; Śródmieście 34, 00-024 Warsaw
- Membership (2006): 2300
- Ideology: Agrarian socialism Decentralization; Laborism; Left-wing nationalism
- Political position: Left-wing
- Religion: Roman Catholic
- Colours: Green
- Slogan: "Lepper must go" Polish: Lepper musi odejść
- Sejm: 0 / 460
- Senate: 0 / 100
- European Parliament: 0 / 51
- Regional assemblies: 0 / 552
- City presidents: 0 / 117

Self-Defence Social Movement (Polish: Samoobrona Ruch Społeczny, SRS) was a political faction within Self-Defence of the Republic of Poland (Polish: Samoobrona Rzeczpospolitej Polskiej, SRP) and later an independent political party. Social Movement emerged as a political faction within SRP in early 2000s amongst the local activists of the party in Mazowsze. The faction placed particular emphasis on agrarianism and rural interests. It also fought for social justice and defended people against evictions. In 2006, Social Movement entered into conflict with party leader Andrzej Lepper over the party's electoral lists for the 2006 Polish local elections, which included many newcomers and non-members at expense of long-serving members of the party. The conflict came to a head when the leader of the faction Sławomir Izdebski demanded expulsions of Krzysztof Filipek from the party.

Lepper responded by expelling Izdebski from the party instead, prompting Social Movement to break away from SRP and become an independent political party in February 2006. The new party was registered and held its founding convention in March 2006, which took place in Czosnów near Warsaw. The convention was attended by 100 former members of SRP, including those expelled and disaffected with the leadership of the party. The new party then grew to 2,300 members, and wanted to challenge SRP in upcoming local elections. However, Lepper filed a lawsuit against the breakaway party, accusing it of being a plagiarism of his party; Social Movement was ruled to be a plagiarized party, which made it unable to participate in the elections. The party dissolved in 2007 and joined Self-Defence Rebirth, a larger Christian socialist SRP breakaway.

== History ==
Before it became a registered political party in 2006, Social Movement was a political faction within the Self-Defence of the Republic of Poland. It emerged in the 2000s amongst local party activists in Mazowsze, and became known for social justice actions such as protesting, legally challenging and obstructing evictions. The faction was devoted to rural and agrarian issues, which was something that Self-Defence started from as an agrarian trade union in the 1990s. The unofficial leader of the faction, Sławomir Izdebski, also led an agrarian trade union in the area. In result, the faction was considered a peasant movement and was particularly known amongst the farmers and in the countryside.

Conflict between Social Movement and the authorities of the party emerged after the 2005 Polish parliamentary election. As the party was preparing for the 2006 Polish local elections, electoral lists that the party would register excluded many long-time party activists in favour of new but connected members or independent candidates that the party established cooperation with. This made Izdebski enter a personal conflict with the leader of the region Krzysztof Filipek. Ultimately, Izdebski confronted the leader of the party Andrzej Lepper, demanding removal of Filipek from the structures of the party. Lepper dismissed the demand and expelled Izdebski from the party, which sparked the exodus of Social Movement faction from the party.

Soon, the problem of SRP's electoral lists turned into a scandal, as it was alleged that Lepper promised places on electoral lists and would exclude those who did not have enough money; this turned into a practice of candidates buying positions on the party's list. Izdebski declared that he was one of the victims to the party's electoral list trading, as it was demanded of him to be included in the list only to be excluded when someone paid more for his place. The existence of numerous irregularities within the party was to be confirmed by further reports of breaches of the law by Lepper and his associates; on the eve of the conclusion of the coalition agreement with the Law and Justice party in 2016, information emerged about recordings of MP Wiśniewski's telephone conversations, which were said to indicate illegal financing of the 2005 election campaign by sympathetic businessmen. Members of the faction now accused the party of being an "extortion sect" and replacing party veterans with wealthy businessmen, betraying the socialist ideals of the party.

Despite the emerging scandals and the expulsion of Izdebski from the party, Social Movement hesitated on creating a new party, hoping to exert pressure on Lepper and reach an agreement with him to reform the party. Other members also hoped to overtake Self-Defence from the inside and dethrone Lepper as the leader of the party. However, ultimately the faction decided to form a separate political party in February 2006, gathering 2300 members in total. The party was formally registered in March, and the national founding convention of the Self-Defence Social Movement was held on 12 March 2006, in Czosnów. It was attended by around 100 people - expelled by Lepper from the party and in conflict with the authorities of Samoobrona. Those taking part in the convention, in accordance with the new party's statute, democratically elected the authorities of Self-Defence Social Movement, with Sławomir Izdebski as chairman, former senator Henryk Dzido, former Samoobrona MP Tadeusz Wojtkowiak and Zbigniew Łuczak as vice-chairmen, former MP Zbigniew Witaszek became the treasurer.

The party presented itself as an alternative to the scandals and chaos in SRP, declaring that Self-Defence Social Movement is meant to be the rightful Self-Defence that will return to its ideals. Izdebski accused Lepper of delegitimatizing the party and its ideals, repeatedly violating the status of the party and illegally expelling activists from the party; he also called SRP a "private farm" of Lepper. Social Movement appealed to the old ideals of Samoobrona from the 1990s, promising a fair and democratic structure as well as to returning to agrarian protests and rural trade unions. The convention was also attended by regional leader of SRP in Świętokrzyskie Józef Cepil, who attended as a form of protest against neglecting his region's interests. Cepil was expelled from SRP as the result.

Social Movement adopted "Lepper must go" (Polish: Lepper musi odejść) as its political slogan, which was a reference to "Balcerowicz must go", a slogan popularized by Self-Defence in order to protest introduction of capitalist system in Poland initiated by the Balcerowicz Plan. Izdebski argued that Self-Defence forgot about its roots of being a movement dedicated to representing the poor, and pledged to re-embrace this concept. Members of the party accused Lepper of trading places on electoral lists for money, with businessmen such as Piotr Misztal being placed on top spots instead of experienced activists, and of moving away from rural problems. The party also attacked SRP for entering a government with right-wing Law and Justice, and rallied SRP members to join Social Movement and unite together to oust Lepper, uniting Self-Defence into a workers' party "just like the Polish United Workers' Party".

The party moved to challenge its parent party in the 2006 Polish local elections, hoping to claim a chunk of Samoobrona's electorate. Political commentators considered the party a viable opponent to Samoobrona in rural areas. To prevent fracturing of his support, Lepper decided to form a new party called "Andrzej Lepper's Self-Defence", intended to separate itself from impostor parties such as the Social Movement or the right-wing breakaway Patriotic Self-Defence. Ultimately SRP was able to prevent Social Movement from participating in the 2006 local elections, issuing a local complaint to the national electoral committee in which he accused Self-Defence Social Movement of plagiarizing SRP. The committee recognized Social Movement as an impostor party and declared their electoral lists invalid. The reasoning for the decision was that the name, abbreviation and logo of the SRS was not clearly distinguishable from those of SRP.

Following the 2006 election, the party initiated agrarian protests against Lepper. The Ministry of Agriculture was blockaded to protest falling prices of meat and grain. Social Movement also pressed SRP on the lists scandal, with Izdebski filing a notification on suspicion of committing a crime against Lepper. Izdebski accused Lepper of extorting money from Samoobrona candidates, forcing them to sign promissory notes worth hundred thousands of PLN and conditioning their inclusion of electoral lists on the basis of the sum of their party donations. In 2007, Social Movement disbanded and joined Self-Defence Rebirth, a much larger breakaway party founded in reaction to the attempt to form League and Self-Defence, a coalition between SRP and far-right League of Polish Families.

== Leadership ==
Party authorities were elected on 12 March 2006:

- Chairman - Slawomir Izdebski, former senator of Samoobrona;
- Vice-Chairman - Henryk Dzido, former senator of Samoobrona;
- Vice-chairman - Zbigniew Łuczak, former chairman of the Łódź Voivodship of the Samoobrona (former founder of the Inicjatywa RP party);
- Vice-Chairman - Tadeusz Wojtkowiak, former MP of Samoobrona;
- Treasurer - Zbigniew Witaszek, former member of Samoobrona.

In August 2006, Henryk Dzido became party chairman. The group's leaders included former Samoobrona MPs from the 4th Sejm: Marian Curyło, Stanisław Głębocki, Jerzy Michalski and Henryk Ostrowski.

== Ideology ==
The party was described as left-wing. Self-Defence Social Movement did not present an alternative program to the Self-Defence of the Republic of Poland, declaring that its main distinctive feature was to be a democratic and decentralized decision-making procedure, especially concerning the shape of electoral lists. The party declared a return to the roots of Self-Defence, and creating a movement free of corruption, something that the party considered Andrzej Lepper to be a representation of. The party declared to continue and follow the program of Self-Defence, defined by its commitment so socialism and agrarianism. The party promoted socialist, nationalist and protectionist policies and appealed to nostalgia for communist People's Republic of Poland.

Despite following the original program of Samoobrona and even being called "the patriotic left" (Lepper described SRP as "the patriotic left, a progressive left, modern, tolerant, without any extremes or deviations"), the party only represented a faction of Self-Defence, which allows for unique currents to be underpinned. The party put special emphasis on rural and agrarian issues, which was also stressed by making green the main party colour. The party also engaged with trade unions to a higher degree than Samoobrona did by the late 2000s, and despite only existing for a year, Self-Defence Social Movement had its own rural trade union. The party was highly regional and was particularly known in the countryside, which gave it a reputation of a peasant movement. This was largely consistent with ideology of Samoobrona, which was largely based on pre-war Polish Socialist Party and the Polish People's Party Wyzwolenie.

One of the main themes in party's ideology was stressing the need to return to the tradition of Samoobrona, that the party supposedly moved too far away from. The party defined returning to agrarian action and rural protests as the main part of Samoobrona's old tradition, which it did return to by organizing such protests in response to falling prices of agricultural products. The party also stated that Samoobrona had forgotten about the poor, which were the main constitutency of Samoobrona. Political scientist Rafał Pankowski wrote that "giving a voice to poor people" was always the overarching focus and idea of Samoobrona, and journalist Ola Wysocka recalled: "in 2006 at the V National Congress of Self-Defence, I asked members of the party to indicate who the party represented. Most of them pointed to “the people”. When prompted to be more specific, they added “disadvantaged people”". Social Movement enjoyed credibility in this regard, as it was known for fighting and challenging evictions when it still existed as a faction within Samoobrona.

The party frequently used class rhetoric. This was also consistent with the ideology of Samoobrona - Madalena Resenda wrote that "Samoobrona's ethos was based on an extreme interpretation of class", describing the party as based on a radical conception of economic class and representing those disadvantages by transition into capitalism, classifying Samoobrona as an extreme-left party. Social Movement devoted itself to this rhetoric while contrasting itself with the SRP, accusing it of having betrayed its values and consisting of "Andrzej Lepper and a group of businessmen who paid money and entered Samoobrona and parliament". According to SRS, Samoobrona had turned an elite that it was always supposed to be fighting for, as it "entered the salons, forgot about the poor and made our movement a money-making business". The party also attacked business in general and presented itself as an unconnected group of honest agrarian activists.

Social Movement downplayed the populist aspect of Samoobrona, and only issue in the context of anti-corruption. The party accused SRP of having become a "private farm" of Lepper, and stated the need to "cleanse" it, as well as promised to "throw out Lepper's entire court". Frequent mentions were made of "Tsar Lepper and his court in Warsaw", further creating the imagery of the fight between "the elite" and "the people". Samoobrona was portrayed as a "sect for extorting money", with honest activists being purged in favour of businessmen, and the problems of the poor and the countryside being neglected. SRS then contrasted it with the concept of "old Samoobrona" that it tried to represent, recalling the infamous road blockades that the party organised with farmers.

In regards to national politics, the party staunchly asserted its left-wing position, and attacked Samoobrona for cooperating with right-wing Law and Justice (PiS); Lepper was criticized for not organizing protests against PiS' policies that went against the interests of Samoobrona and its constitutency. Izdebski stated: "The father of the nation is on his knees before the Kaczyński brothers". The party also spoke positively about communist-era Polish United Workers' Party, and stated its goal to unite the trade union movement in the same way that PZPR did. Samoobrona was known for its friendly attitude towards communist Poland - Mirosław Karwat considered Samoobrona to be "probably the only political party that speaks well of Communist Poland"., and Piotr Długosz called the party an "heir of the communist regime".

== See also ==
- Self-Defence of the Republic of Poland
- Self-Defence Rebirth
- Self-Defence of the Polish Nation
- Patriotic Self-Defence
- League of Polish Families
- Andrzej Lepper
- Party of Regions (Poland)
