= Self-Defence Rebirth =

Self-Defence Rebirth Samoobrona Odrodzenie
- Abbreviation: SO
- Leader: Sławomir Izdebski
- Founder: Henryk Dzido
- Founded: 23 June 2007
- Split from: SRP
- Preceded by: SRS
- Headquarters: ul. Polna 3A lok. 14, 00-622 Warsaw
- Membership (2018): 7000
- Ideology: Agrarian socialism Catholic socialism Catholic left Laborism
- Political position: Left-wing
- Religion: Roman Catholic
- Colours: Blue
- Slogan: "Family, nation, faith" Polish: Rodzina, naród, wiara
- Sejm: 0 / 460
- Senate: 0 / 100
- European Parliament: 0 / 51
- Regional assemblies: 0 / 552
- City presidents: 0 / 117

Website
- http://samoobrona.mazowsze.pl

Self-Defence Rebirth (Polish: Samoobrona Odrodzenie, SO) is a Polish political party founded by the former Self-Defence of the Republic of Poland activists. The party was founded by the former lawyer of Andrzej Lepper, Henryk Dzido, who split off from the main Self-Defence party following numerous scandals and the electoral collapse of Samoobrona. Self-Defence Rebirth was also created over concerns that Samoobrona might form a coalition with the right-wing League of Polish Families. Zbigniew Witaszek is one of the key activists of the new party. The party describes itself as Catholic socialist, agrarian socialist, Soft Eurosceptic and left-wing.

The main goal of Self-Defence Rebirth to unite all movements that have distanced themselves from Lepper's party but are still based on the Samoobrona party. According to its founder Henryk Dzido, Self-Defence Rebirth is strictly left-wing and aspired to follow the original program of the Samoobrona movement from the 1990s. The party is concerned by the rise of right-wing movements in Poland such as the League of Polish Families. The party also focuses on promoting agrarian and rural interests, with the current leader of the party, Sławomir Izdebski, being a prominent member of a rural national trade union center All-Poland Alliance of Trade Unions.

== History ==
The party was formed in July 2007 from a merger of the Self-Defence Social Movement (Polish: Samoobrona Ruch Społeczny) party and several other marginal groups formed by splitters from the Self-Defence of the Republic of Poland. Other parties that participated in the founding of the party were Self-Defence of the Polish Nation (Polish: Samoobrona Narodu Polskiego), Patriotic Self-Defence, as well regionalist Self-Defence factions of Gorzów and Radom. The main reason behind the creation of Self-Defence Rebirth was to protest the concept of League and Self-Defence, which would be a merger of Self-Defence with far-right League of Polish Families. SO also seceded over the promissory notes scandal; the issue of promissory notes (Polish: weksle) in Self-Defence became notorious in late 2006, when several MPs left the Samoobrona parliamentary club. The party then announced the "launch" of promissory notes against the defectors, which the MPs had signed before the election. This obliged the defectors to pay compensation to the party, which often amounted to several hundred thousand PLN.

Self-Defence Rebirth stems from the Social Movement faction within Samoobrona, which emerged in early 2000s amongst local party activists in Mazowsze; the faction became known for social justice actions such as obstructing and proesting evictions. The faction also focused on rural and agrarian issues, and organized local rural trade unions. This made the faction be considered a peasant movement, which became popular in the countryside.

Conflict between Social Movement and original Samoobrona emerged in early 2006, as electoral lists that the party would register for the 2006 Polish local elections excluded many long-time party activists in favour of new but connected members or independent candidates that the party established cooperation with. This made Sławomir Izdebski, the leader of the faction, enter a personal conflict with the leader of the region Krzysztof Filipek. Ultimately, Izdebski confronted the leader of the party Andrzej Lepper, demanding removal of Filipek from the structures of the party. Lepper dismissed the demand and expelled Izdebski from the party, which sparked the exodus of Social Movement faction from the party.

Soon, the problem of SRP's electoral lists turned into a scandal, as it was alleged that Lepper promised places on electoral lists and would exclude those who did not have enough money; this turned into a practice of candidates buying positions on the party's list. Izdebski declared that he was one of the victims to the party's electoral list trading, as it was demanded of him to be included in the list only to be excluded when someone paid more for his place. The existence of numerous irregularities within the party was to be confirmed by further reports of breaches of the law by Lepper and his associates; on the eve of the conclusion of the coalition agreement with the Law and Justice party in 2016, information emerged about recordings of MP Wiśniewski's telephone conversations, which were said to indicate illegal financing of the 2005 election campaign by sympathetic businessmen.

The faction then decided to form a separate political part, gathering 2300 members in total. The party was formally registered in March, and the national founding convention of the Self-Defence Social Movement was held on 12 March 2006, in Czosnów. It was attended by around 100 people - expelled by Lepper from the party and in conflict with the authorities of Samoobrona. Those taking part in the convention, in accordance with the new party's statute, democratically elected the authorities of Self-Defence Social Movement, with Sławomir Izdebski as chairman, former senator Henryk Dzido, former Samoobrona MP Tadeusz Wojtkowiak and Zbigniew Łuczak as vice-chairmen, former MP Zbigniew Witaszek became the treasurer.

Party leaders included fifth-term senator Henryk Dzido, fifth-term MP Alfred Budner (and the party's only parliamentarian) and fourth-term MPs Marian Curyło, Waldemar Borczyk and Zbigniew Witaszek. The party also included Sławomir Izdebski, a prominent agrarian trade unions activists related to Polish People's Party and the peasant movement.

In the parliamentary elections in 2007, Alfred Budner and Sławomir Izdebski ran for the Sejm from the Law and Justice list, but did not obtain a seat as an MP. In Konin electoral district, Alfred Budner received 6736 votes, and Sławomir Izdebski in Siedlce electoral district received 3838 votes.

In November 2007, another new party that split from Samoobrona was created - the Party of Regions created out of the regionalist wing of Samoobrona. As Self-Defence Rebirth itself was closely aligned to Samoobrona regionalist, the party postponed their convention in order to start merger talks with the Party of Regions.

By the end of 2007, most of Samoobrona Odrodzenie's activists joined other groups - including Party of Regions, PSL and PiS. On 2 September 2008 it was deleted from the register of political parties.

Following the suicide of Andrzej Lepper in 2011, Self-Defence Rebirth under the leadership of Henryk Dzido sought to revitalise the Samoobrona movement by uniting various minor fractured parties and movements under the single banner of Self-Defence Rebirth. Dzido was considered a conciliatory figure acceptable to all former factions and wings of Samoobrona.

After an unsuccessful attempt to take over Samoobrona following the death of Andrzej Lepper in 2011, Henryk Dzido decided to relaunch Samoobrona Odrodzenie. An application for party registration was submitted in 2012, and as a result of a court order of 10 January 2013, the party was again listed in the register of political parties. The party tried to re-organize and revive the Samoobrona movement after the death of its leader - in an interview, Henryk Dzido stated that many sympathizers of Samoobrona became active after Lepper's and were interested in making it a political force again. SO stated its belief that while Polish political scene was becoming consolidated between two major parties (right-wing Law and Justice and centre-right Civic Platform), this situation would be temporary as "the dominance of two right-wing parties is not normal". In 2014, the party started cooperating with Stronnictwo Polska Racja Stanu, among others. At the time, it failed to agree on a joint run in the 2014 Polish local elections with Organisation of the Polish Nation - Polish League. The SO fielded one election list each for the mazowieckie and podkarpackie assemblies.

During the convention of re-registered Self-Defence Rebirth, its leader at the time, Henryk Dzido, emphasised that the party wishes to "continue the noble ideals and program" of the original Self-Defence of the Republic of Poland party, although Dzido emphasised that the program of Self-Defence Rebirth was "modified according to the times". The party released a statement stating that only grassroots support and local structures will allow the Samoobrona movement to enter politics again, and that Self-Defence Rebirth wants to dedicate itself to building "a solid and stable membership base". Regardings its ideology, Self-Defence Rebirth announced a return "to the best traditions of Samoobrona RP", although the party also stated that it wants to abandon the common image of Self-Defence as a protest party.

In 2011, the party became active in regional farmer councils, with party members such as Stanisław Izdebski becoming members of the Council of the Chamber of Agriculture in Siedlce. The party also reached out to Polish miners, considering them fellow allies of the agrarian movement and calling for protectionist measures that would allow the local mining industry to develop instead of importing coal from the East. SO continued the tradition of organizing prominent farmer protests - an action that original Samoobrona became infamous for in the 1990s. The party condemned fellow trade unionists that decided to negotiate with the government, and continued 2011 protests in order to extract further concessions.

In 2014, Self-Defence Rebirth accepted the invitation of Samoobrona's leader Lech Kuropatwiński, with the goal of the meeting being stated as "unity in the local government elections as well as in post-election activities". As a result of the meeting, the two parties agreed on a joint election committee called "Self-Defence ONP-LP". However, the planned coalition was cancelled a few days later because the activists of Polish Independence Assembly and the Organisation of the Polish Nation - Polish League withdrew from coalition-talks. As such, the electoral committee "Self-Defence ONP-LP" was annulled.

In the second round of the 2015 Polish presidential election, the SO supported Andrzej Duda of PiS (against incumbent President Bronisław Komorowski). In the 2015 Polish parliamentary election, the party did not run. The party extended its cooperation with agrarian trade unions in 2015, organizing the congress of Farmers and Agricultural Organisations at the Warsaw University of Life Sciences. The congress was attended by around 300 farmers, and several road blockades by agrarian activists were subsequently planned and carried out. SO demanded financial compensation to farmers by the government due to declining prices, compensation for crops destroyed by wild boards, as well as speeding up the payment of EU subsidies. Political commentators focused on the emergence of Stanisław Izdebski as a prominent figure within the party, portraying him as "growing into a Lepper".

Sławomir Izdebski became the head of the All-Poland Agreement of Trade Unions of Farmers and Agricultural Organisations, and also became a co-founder of the Social Movement of the Republic of Poland. The new organization was founded together with the far-left Social Justice Movement, and was to be an alternative to centre-left parties such as Democratic Left Alliance and Palikot Movement; it represents the interests of farmers, trade unions, disabled, unemployed and regionalist activists.

In August 2018, the party established cooperation with Samoobrona. On 7 October of the same year, the chairman of the grouping, Henryk Dzido, died. In the 2018 Polish local elections and in the 2019 Polish parliamentary election, SO did not run.

In the 2023 Polish parliamentary election, the new leader of the party Sławomir Izdebski attacked the leader of AGROunia, a left-wing agrarian party inspired by Samoobrona, for joining the Civic Coalition. Izbedski declared that "no one has ever before in history humiliated Polish farmers in the way that Michał Kołodziejczak has done", and invited AGROunia members to join Self-Defence Rebirth and the adjacent rural trade union All-Poland Alliance of Trade Unions of Farmers and Agricultural Organisations (Polish: Ogólnopolskie Porozumienie Związków Zawodowych Rolników i Organizacji Rolniczych). SO stated that it will continue to defend the interests of Polish farmers and trade unions. Izdeski also formed three main demands to parties competing in the election, which included less predatory credits for farmers, more accessible building credits and construction of additional agrarian warehouses.

The party formulated "The Farmers' Twelve Points" for the 2023 election in cooperation with representatives of agrarian trade unions. The points included long-term loans for farmers, land-leasing, increased investment in animal husbandry research and reduced imports of agricultural products from abroad. Three of main political parties agreed to these demands - Law and Justice, Confederation Liberty and Independence and Polish People's Party. The party spoke particularly warmly of Polish People's Party (PSL), but it refrained from making an endorsement because the coalition partner of PSL, Poland 2050, rejected the twelve points. Original Samoobrona (SRP) also made no endorsement and asked its supporters to vote with their conscience, although it criticized Law and Justice in its statement, arguing that the party betrayed Lepper and SRP back in 2007.

In 2024, Sławomir Izdebski and the party supported the 2024 Polish farmers' protests, and Izdebski's trade union also voted in favour of joining the protests. Izdebski criticized individual farmer groups that signed an agreement with the government, arguing that the agreements signed are worthless and do not take into account most of the problems that forced the farmers to protest in the first place. Izdebski demanded that the EU-imposed restrictions on fur farming be lifted, along with special subsidies to farmers. The demands of Self-Defence Rebirth farmers also included protectionist measures against the Ukrainian grain.

== Ideology ==
Coat of arms of Poland from 1919, that the party wanted to restore

Self-Defence Rebirth by and large follows the ideology of its original party, Samoobrona. The party utilises left-wing populist and anti-establishment rhetoric. Henryk Dzido stated: "The privateness that appeared in Samoobrona, the issue of pathology, corruption, are all alien to us". The party classified itself as left-wing, describing itself as "as left-wing as Samoobrona was when we founded it". Self-Defence Rebirth pledges to follow the left-wing, left-nationalist and Catholic socialist ideals based on those of the Samoobrona party. Members of the party described themselves as "true leftists by belief, Catholics by profession and with Andrzej Lepper as the role model". Leader of the party, Henryk Dzido, stated that Self-Defence Rebirth is a party that encompasses members and sympathizers who are "left-wing in their nature, although at the same time deeply religious".

While the program of Self-Defence Rebirth is identical to that of the Samoobrona party from the 1990s, the nature of the movement is different as it represents only some factions within the original party. Self-Defence Rebirth came from a faction of Samoobrona known as the Social Movement, which focused on blocking evictions, aiding pensioners and protesting deregulation and privatisation policies. The party is also closely related to agrarian trade unions, reflecting higher emphasis on rural issues and agrarian socialism in the new party. Self-Defence Rebirth is also aligned to the regionalist wing of Samoobrona, and wanted to form a merger with the Party of Regions.

Self-Defence Rebirth also heavily emphasises its Roman Catholic character, and portrays itself as a party committed to the principles of Catholic social teaching as well as Catholic socialism. This is in contrast to the original Samoobrona party, which would gradually transform itself from a traditional protest party to a "stabilised left-wing party", drifing closer to the mainstream post-communist left-wing parties. According to Piotr Długosz, Self-Defence Rebirth promotes a new kind of a socialist system based on agrarian and socialist ideals, while the Samoobrona itself focused made appeals to the nostalgia for the Polish People's Republic; as such, Długosz considers the latter an "heir of the communist regime".

It was reported that party meetings of Self-Defence Rebirth were started with a prayer, instead of the "folkish" character of the original Samoobrona party. Self-Defence Rebirth also cooperated with Political Catholic partie such as "Polska Racja Stanu" and "Samorządna Polska". The party supported a civic initiative that called for the Sejm of Poland to grant Jesus Christ a special title in Poland; the party also called for a restoration of the 1919 Polish coat of arms, which it defined as "a white eagle with a crown enclosed by eight arches surmounted by a cross, without stars on the shoulders of its wings".

Despite its more religion-oriented rhetoric, the new party is considered to be more left-wing than original Samoobrona, and was created in a response to the proposal of a merger with a right-wing League of Polish Families party. This proposal, unofficially known as League and Self-Defense, provoked an outrage in the Samoobrona party, as the majority of party members self-identified as left-wing and considered this union unthinkable. Upon founding Self-Defence Rebirth, Henryk Dzido emphasised that he intended the new party to be more "as left-wing as Samoobrona was when we founded it", reflecting the view that original Samoobrona had drifted away from its left-wing roots.

One of the main issues that differentiates Self-Defence Rebirth from post-2001 Samoobrona is its dedication to trade unions, focusing less on political campaigning and program in favour of promoting and organizing the labour movement. The current leader of the party, Sławomir Izdebski, was described as someone not of "the soul not of a politician but of a trade unionist". This is seen as a part of returning to the 'old tradition' of Samoobrona, given how the original party emerged as a trade union known for its radical agrarianism as well as infamous farmer protests. Between the 1997 and 2001 elections, Samoobrona became an iconic trade union that organized mostly at the local level and promoted grassroots activism and recruited new members. Lepper also touted his image as a revolutionary peasant leader, winning the support of socialist and nostalgic voters given his record - Lepper did not participate in the anti-communist Solidarity movement, and never took part in any protest against the communist regime. Samoobrona largely abandoned its trade union roots in favour of becoming a stabilized political party in 2001, and its "volunteer unionists were brutally turned into salaried politicians".

The party is critical of neo-liberal policies and argues that neoliberalism brought Poland to the brink of a collapse on an economic, social and moral scale. Running on a staunchly anti-establishment platform, Self-Defence Rebirth argues that large corporations "mercilessly exploit" Polish workers, leading to "economic totalitarianism, financial terror, information restrictions and bogus, corrupt democracy".

Self-Defence Rebirth promotes the ideals of egalitarianism, primacy of labour over capital, social ethics and aggressive economic interventionism. The party wants to restore state monopolies on most industries, especially the ones considered most strategic, including the defence industry, rail networks and telecommunications, and advocates for strict regulations on the financial and banking sectors. According to the party, money would be produced according to the need and prices of basic commodities would be heavily regulated. The role of the state is to intervene in order to keep commodity and energy prices low.

The party believes that consumerism and materialism should be replaced in favour of an agrarian socialist economy that would promote a closer relationship with the environment, humane treatment of animals and replacing big farms with small, family-owned ones. Similarly to the original party, Self-Defence Rebirth promotes the concepts of "econology" and "eco-development", based on a "new way of thinking based on theories of social systems, ecology and social ethics and morality in politics and economics".

The party closely worked with Social Justice Movement, a far-left socialist party. Two parties made an electoral alliance for the 2015 Polish parliamentary election Social Movement of the Republic of Poland (Polish: Ruch Społeczny Rzeczypospolitej Polskiej). The new coalition included community activists, organisers of agricultural blockades, disabled people and trade unionists. Self-Defence Rebirth stressed the need for an "authentic left-wing" party to enter the Sejm, and described itself as more radical than SLD and Palikot Movement. The party described itself as fighting for the rights of the unemployed, debtors, evicted tenants and employees working on so-called junk contracts (Polish: umowy śmieciowe).

Similarly to original Samoobrona, Self-Defence Rebirth followed the Marxist view of class warfare. According to political scientist Madalena Resenda, "Samoobrona’s ethos was based on an extreme interpretation of class", describing the party as based on a radical conception of economic class and representing those disadvantages by transition into capitalism, classifying Samoobrona as an extreme-left party. Self-Defence Rebirth argued that poor farmers have no representation in Poland at all. The party contrasted them to rich farmers, which are able to push through their demands by lobbying and well-funded protests. The party also strongly opposes capitalism and free market, stating that it is impossible to guarantee the welfare of farmers in a market economy.

In contrast to Self-Defence of the Republic of Poland, SO consistently places more emphasis on religion. Samoobrona had an ambivalent attitude towards religion, emphasizing its commitment to Catholic social teaching on one hand but making appeals to freedom of religions on the other. Andrzej Lepper argued that the disputes between the world of politics and the hierarchy were of a substitute nature and should not constitute the essence of the public debate. At the same time, the party condemned the attitude of Catholic hierarchy of Poland, accusing Polish bishops of abandoning social sensitivity and option for the poor in favour of materialism and a "financial empire" instead, with Lepper going as far as claiming that "they value money more than God". Self-Defence Rebirth offered a different view, declaring itself as a party staunchly committed to Catholic values; the party was described as deeply religious while espousing left-wing views at the same time.

== See also ==
- Self-Defence of the Republic of Poland
- Patriotic Self-Defence
- League of Polish Families
- Andrzej Lepper
- Party of Regions (Poland)
- Self-Defence Social Movement
- Self-Defence of the Polish Nation
