= Organisation of the Polish Nation – Polish League =

Organisation of the Polish Nation: Polish League; Polish: Organizacja Narodu Polskiego – Liga Polska
- Abbreviation: ONP-LP; ONP
- Leader: Stanisław Bujnicki
- Founder: Jan Pyszko
- Founded: 15 June 2000
- Registered: 25 October 2000
- Dissolved: 21 November 2025
- Headquarters: Al. Ujazdowskie 6a/25, 00-461 Warsaw
- Membership (2014): 2000
- Ideology: National Democracy; Political Catholicism; Protectionism; Economic nationalism Polish minority interests
- Political position: Centre-right
- Religion: Roman Catholicism
- National affiliation: Piast Faction
- International affiliation: Liga Polska
- Colours: White; Red
- Slogan: God, Honour, Fatherland

Website
- onp-lp.pl

Organisation of the Polish Nation – Polish League (Polish: Organizacja Narodu Polskiego – Liga Polska, ONP-LP or ONP) was a Polish centre-right political party founded in 2000 that participated in local and parliamentary Polish elections, bringing together activists from Poland and Poles in exile. The party was created with an aim to create a common front for Polish communities abroad, providing them legal and political representation. Ideologically, the party adhered to "national, cultural and Christian values born out of the over a thousand-year history of the Polish State". The ONP-LP considered itself to be based on the "Christian, agrarian, nationalist and anti-liberal" tradition. It had immigrant community clubs and cooperated with Polish diaspora organisations in Switzerland, Norway and Australia. The party participated in the 2005 Polish parliamentary election as well as the 2005 presidential election, albeit it only won a marginal number of votes. It also ran on electoral lists of nationalist parties until 2019. It was deregistered in 2025.

The party promoted Catholic, Christian democratic and corporatist values, considering "land, resources, property, landscape, environmental, cultural values" to be an integral good and following the Catholic social teaching. In its program, the party planned to fight "against the degeneration of the democratic system", promote Polish patriotic tradition, and to guide the Polish economy by the "national and state interest of Poland" through nationalization programs. It opposed abortion, and supported of Catholic media such as Radio Maryja. It praised the interwar Sanacja regime and promoted a new Polish constitution based on the 1935 April Constitution. One of the main priorities of the party were the Polish communities and repatriates from Russia and Kazakhstan, representing their interests. The ONP-LP was inspired by and claimed to be a successor of the liberal democratic Polish émigré organisation Liga Polska, founded in Switzerland by Zygmunt Miłkowski following the failure of the January Uprising.

== History ==
In 1990, the Polish Basel Forum was established to assist the transformation of the Third Polish Republic at the economic level. However, due to a lack of capacity, this did not materialise. It was therefore decided to establish a political party. On 25 October 2000, a grouping under the name "Polish League - Polish Nation's Organisation" was registered in the Register of Political Parties. The party was founded and developed by Polish nationalist communities in Switzerland and Chicago, including the newspaper "Our Poland" (Polish: Nasza Polska) and the Eugeniusz Kwiatkowski Maritime and Economic Association (Polish: Stowarzyszenie Morsko-Gospodarcze im. Eugeniusza Kwiatkowskiego). At the time of its declaration, the party was declared to be a "united front to save Poland" and was to represent "a refusal to expropriate Poles from their property, national heritage and religious heritage".

On 24 February 2001, a founding congress was held with the participation of delegates from Poland, Western Europe and North and South America. The creation of party structures began in the country, as well as abroad (in Norway, Chicago, France, Switzerland, Australia and Canada). In 2001, attempts by the party to co-operate with Stronnictwo Narodowe activists failed, and they subsequently formed Liga Polskich Rodzin. However, some members of the Polish League ran on LPR lists, failing to gain seats. In 2002 the party took part in the local elections, and in 2003 in the 2003 Polish European Union membership referendum it campaigned to vote against Poland's membership in the European Union.

=== Polish membership in the EU ===
After the 2003 referendum passed and Poland became a member of the European Union, the party continued to oppose the European Union as well as the Polish membership in it. The party argued that the European Union is dominated by Germany, and that Poland is an inferior member that will be exploited by the much wealthier Western countries. The leader of the party, Jan Pyszko, blamed the Democratic Left Alliance for pushing for the membership in the EU and for mismanaging the aftermath of entering the EU, writing: "Instead of the promised growing prosperity - a ‘return to normality’. - what followed was economic collapse, growing corruption at the highest levels of state leadership, further theft of national assets, robbery and all the symptoms of bankruptcy."

=== Patriotic Front of the Socialist Left ===
Despite being a right-leaning party, the Organisation of the Polish Nation – Polish League has friendly relations with some left-wing Polish parties, being particularly supportive of left-wing nationalist ones. In December 2003, the party became a part of a political alliance Patriotic Front of the Socialist Left (Polish: Patriotyczny Front Lewicy Socjalistycznej), composed of marginal left-wing parties and some right-leaning ones. The Patriotic Front was heavily critical of the 1990s reforms that transitioned Poland to a capitalist free market economy, arguing that while the Polish governments of the 1990s promised a "free, prosperous and democratic Poland", the reforms instead resulted in massive unemployment, loss of social rights, poverty, the collapse of health service and wealth inequality.

The alliance proposed policies such as taxation of 'excessive wealth', increasing the minimum wage, restoring the social benefits of the communist Poland, and state control of the economy. The Patriotic Front also argued that the Polish entrance into the European Union resulted into loss of economic sovereignty of Poland, which "may even threaten the loss of its own statehood". The parties of the alliance signed a declaration arguing that Poland has become dominated by foreign capital and is now a "quasi-colony". The parties also condemned policies such as privatisation and allowing foreign capital in Poland, and proposed protectionist laws as well as ban on foreign ownership in important industries. However, ultimately the Patriotic Front of the Socialist Left never carried out political activities.

=== Jankowski affair ===
In August 2004, the party attracted controversy by defending and claiming the innocence of Polish Catholic priest Henryk Jankowski, who was accused of child sexual abuse. Together with the Union of Polish Organisations in Switzerland (Polish: Związek Organizacji Polskich w Szwajcarii, the Organisation of the Polish Nation – Polish League issued a statement in which it strongly protested "against the slander directed against Father Henryk Jankowski" and declared its readiness to "stand in defence of his reputation, honour and truth". Jankowski was never convicted, and the issue remains unresolved; in 2023, the Polish court censored parts of a 2018 documentary showcasing the accusations against Jankowski, stating that the documentary included unverified and unproven information, and that there was no evidence to portray Jankowski's guilt as certain.

=== 2005 elections ===
In the 2005 Polish parliamentary election, The Polish Nation's Organisation - Polish League put forward six candidates for the Senate, but none of them obtained a seat. They were:

- Mieczysław Biliński. - Krosno District,
- Janusz Dobrowolski - Siedlce District,
- Marek Głogoczowski - Bialystok district,
- Michał Okrześ - Legnica district,
- Janusz Soroka - Zielona Góra district,
- Józef Wysocki - Wrocław district.

Together they won 61,038 votes. In the elections to the Sejm, 3 ONP-LP representatives ran unsuccessfully:

- Witold Kruszyński - Wałbrzych district, Patriotic Movement list, received 89 votes,
- Roman Urbański - District of Gdynia, list Dom Ojczysty, received 45 votes,
- Mieczysław Sass - District Bydgoszcz, Narodowe Odrodzenie Polski list, received 26 votes.

The ONP-LP candidate in the 2005 Polish presidential election was party chairman Jan Pyszko - he received 10,371 votes, i.e. 0.07%. The press noted that despite being a Polish émigré activist, Pyszko did not speak Polish well. Polish weekly Wprost compared Pyszko to the 1990s Polish populist presidential candidate Stanisław Tymiński, arguing that both Tymiński and Pyszko represented a kind of populist rhetoric that was outclassed by left-wing populists such as Andrzej Lepper. During the election, the ONP-LP was characterized as a nationalist and anti-EU party that promotes the 1935 Polish constitution and the interests of Polish diaspora. Pyszko summarized the views of his party as following: "We say an absolute ‘No! ’ to the European Union. We say absolutely no to abortion on demand. We say absolutely ‘no! ’ to the germanisation of our Polish land and national assets. Let us get the best Polish women and men into local government." His main campaign slogan was "Poland's future your future".

The party ran a low-profile campaign, spending about 6000 PLN on the presidential campaign in total; in contrast, the winning party, right-wing populist Law and Justice, spend 7.3 million PLN. Jan Pyszko became the oldest presidential candidate in Polish history, as he was 75 at the time. The election was marred with irregularities, as despite only winning 0.07% of the popular vote, Pyszko won 13% of the vote in the Silesiak gmina of Rudnik, while the left-wing populist candidate Andrzej Lepper did not gain a single vote there.

In the 2005 Polish parliamentary election, the party entered talks with the Self-Defence of the Polish Nation, a right-wing nationalist split from the far-left agrarian party Self-Defence of the Republic of Poland. The ONP-LP as well as Self-Defence of the Polish Nation planned to organize a joint list for the election. Ultimately the two parties did not participate in the parliamentary election, but Self-Defence of the Polish Nation endorsed Jan Pyszko in the presidential election.

=== Later activities ===
In 2006, the party put forward a proposal to create state-owned media that would target Polish diaspora. This media was to promote national consciousness amongst Poles abroad and establish a flow of information between the Polish state and Polish immigrant communities. In order to pursue this goal, the party created the All-Polish online newspaper KWORUM (Polish: Polsko-Polonijna Gazeta Internetowa KWORUM) the same year.

In 2007 to the Sejm and in 2009 to the Parliament, the party's candidate was the then chairman of the party's central board, Jan Eugeniusz Malinowski. In the Warsaw district, in the elections in 2007, running on the Law and Justice list, he received 266 votes, and in the elections to the European Parliament in 2009, running on the Libertas list, he received 128 votes.

In 2008, the party attended the party congress of an agrarian party Piast Faction, created in 2006. The congress was also attended by some former activists of the Self-Defence of the Republic of Poland as well as Polish People's Party. During the congress, the ONP-LP informally became a part of the Piast Faction, in an agreement that was based on the German CDU/CSU union. Both parties declared their intention to create a "Christian-popular-nationalist bloc" that would oppose liberal parties such as the Civic Platform. Some political proposals put forward during the congress including developing the mining industry in Silesia, improving the health service in Poland, and allocating additional funding to education. In February 2008, the Organisation of the Polish Nation – Polish League together with the Piast Faction supported farmer protests against exports of meat products from the European Union. The farmers demanded additional quality controls of imported meat, together with restrictions that would ensure that Polish meat is prioritized in the market.

In 2010, the party attended the funeral of Stefan Melak, Polish activist and journalist who died in the Smolensk air disaster. Together with the Organisation of the Polish Nation – Polish League, the funeral mass was also attended by the Confederation of Independent Poland as well as members of veterans’ organisations.

In the parliamentary elections in 2011, two ONP-LP representatives ran for the Sejm from the Right of the Republic list. Mieczysław Biliński in Krosno district received 34 votes, and Eugeniusz Murawski in Warsaw II received 25 votes. Before the local elections in 2014, the party was supposed to set up a joint committee with Self-Defence Rebirth, but the agreement was ultimately not reached. In the parliamentary elections in 2015, party member Jerzy Strzelecki ran for the Senate in Ostrołęka district on behalf of the Citizens for Parliament committee, coming third out of 4 candidates (he received 18,107 votes, i.e. 13.09%).

In November 2012, the party participated in a nationalist march organised by the ultranationalist far-right party National Revival of Poland. The march was organised under slogans such as ‘God, Honour and Fatherland’, ‘National Radicalism’, ‘Down with the European Union’ and ‘Here they come, here come the nationalists’. The ONP-LP and the National Revival of Poland participated in similar coordinated actions in 2012, including a protest demanding that Poland pursue an isolationist foreign policy that would seek distance from Russia, USA, as well as the European Union.

In 2015, the ONP-LP organised an anti-immigrant march together with the National Radical Camp with the motto ‘Yes to repatriates, no to immigrants’. The leader of the party, Stanisław Bujnicki, made a speech during the march in which he highlighted the hardships that Poles living in Kazakhstan experience, arguing that it is difficult for the Polish community in Kazakhstan to return to Poland.

ONP-LP cooperated with Normalny Kraj and Polska Patriotyczna. In the parliamentary elections in 2019, party member Adam Bednarczyk opened the Action of Disappointed Retirees and Pensioners list in the Siedlce district, receiving 398 votes. He also put forward his candidacy in the 2020 Polish presidential election, but did not collect enough signatures to register his candidacy.

The party did not participate in the 2023 Polish parliamentary election. On 5 May 2025, the National Electoral Commission declared that the party did not submit a financial declaration for 2024. As a result, the party was deregistered on 21 November 2025, after 25 years of existence.

== Party presidents and structure ==
The party's president until his death (18 October 2009) was Dr. Jan Pyszko, a candidate for President of the Republic of Poland in 2005. On 27 March 2010 he was replaced by Janusz Lech Siemiński, who died on 15 September 2012. He was succeeded by Stanisław Bujnicki.

The party was structured along a tripartite separation of competences - the supreme authorities of the party was congress of the party, the party's president, as well as the general council. The party also had a central review board. All organs of the party were elected by its members, and the party statute separated the tenure of council members into 4-years-long terms. The most important authority in the party was the congress.

== Election results ==
=== Presidential ===
Election	Candidate	First round		Second round	
Election	Candidate	Votes	%	Votes	%
2005	Jan Pyszko	10,371	0.07 (#11)	Endorsed Lech Kaczyński	

=== Sejm ===
Election	Votes	%	Seats	+/–
2001	1,025,148	7.9	0 / 460	New
2001	As part of the League of Polish Families, which won 38 seats.			
2005	160	0.1	0 / 460	Steady
2005	On the lists of Ancestral Home, National Revival of Poland and Ruch Patriotyczny.			
2007	266	0.1	0 / 460	Steady
2007	On the lists of Law and Justice.			
2011	59	0.1	0 / 460	Steady
2011	On the lists of the Right Wing of the Republic.			
2015	1,964	0.1	0 / 460	Steady
2015	As part of Obywatele do Parlamentu, which won no seats.			
2019	398	0.1	0 / 460	Steady
2019	On the lists of the Action of Disappointed Retirees and Pensioners.			

=== Senate ===
Election	Votes	%	Seats	+/–
2001	1,097,058	4.1	0 / 100	New
2001	As part of the League of Polish Families, which won 2 seats.			
2005	61,038	0.1	0 / 100	Steady
2007	10,208,412	31.4	0 / 100	Steady
2007	As part of Law and Justice, which won 39 seats.			
2011	82,115	0.6	0 / 100	Steady
2011	As part of the Right Wing of the Republic, which won no seats.			
2015	18,107	0.1	0 / 100	Steady
2015	As part of Obywatele do Parlamentu, which won no seats.			
2019	21,943	0.1	0 / 100	Steady
2019	As part of the Right Wing of the Republic, which won no seats.			

=== Regional assemblies ===
Election	Votes	%	Seats	+/–
2002	2,559	0.3 (#15)	0 / 561	New

=== European Parliament ===
Election	Votes	%	Seats	+/–
2009	128	0.1	0 / 54	New
2009	On the lists of Libertas Poland.			

== Ideology ==
The Organisation of the Polish Nation – Polish League described itself as a patriotic and Christian grouping of a social and national character, and claimed strict adherence to the teachings of the Catholic Church and the Catholic social teaching. It set the defence of the national identity of Poland as its main objective. It brought together activists from Poland and abroad. The party supported and proposed additional funding for Catholic media such as Radio Maryja, praised the Polish interwar Sanacja regime and advocated constitutional reforms based on the 1935 Polish constitution, supported additional vetting laws against former communist officials (known as lustration), and stressed the need to fight anti-Polonism abroad. The party was also considered to be a representative of the National Democracy movement, known as endecja or neo-endecja.

The party believed that state ownership in strategic sectors was to be maintained and protected by adopting a package of laws guaranteeing state control over strategic sectors of the economy. It called for nationalised agriculture, and proposed a protectionist package that would protect Polish farmers from competitive markets. The party also wanted to introduce a law that would prohibit the sale of Polish land to foreign legal persons and organisations. The party was critical of the free market and capitalism with powerful private sector, believing that the free market sees "the human being as an object, a necessary factor for economic effects" and promotes "the consumerist treatment of the world, the disregard for the natural needs of man and the materialistic conception of reality". The party was opposed to abortion on demand.

The main priority of the party was representing the interests of Polish diaspora; it argued that the Polish disapora is marginalised and ignored in Poland. The party stressed the need to prevent the Polish communities abroad from disappearing due to assimilation, and described the erosion of national consciousness and Polish patriotism amongst Polish diaspora as "alarming". The Organisation of the Polish Nation – Polish League proposed a program of "revival of national consciousness" to establish close cooperation and flow of information between the Polish state and Polish diasporas. The party proposed founding state-funded youth organisations abroad, together with projects that would promote Polish literature and education. The core proposal of the party in this area was an establishment of a media outlet for Polish diaspora which would include a newspaper, radio and a television station that would allow Poles abroad to have easily available Polish media.

=== Party program ===
The party's programme postulates included:

- creation of new jobs in Poland through social and private investment with the involvement of Polish capital;
- creating legal, institutional and financial bases for the functioning of small and medium-sized enterprises;
- ensuring Poland's energy security and the use of renewable energy in every municipality in the country;
- increasing the importance of Poland's maritime economy and maritime and inland fisheries;
- introducing free and generally accessible education in Poland;
- ensuring full range of medical services and availability of medicines for all Poles;
- improving working conditions and living standards of the Polish population;
- launching the Polish-Polish Investment Bank, the Polish-Polish Foundation, the Polish-Polish Exchange and other joint institutions;
- introduction of single-mandate electoral districts;
- introduction of a constituency for Polonia.

=== Conflict with the far-right ===
Despite being a nationalist party, the Organisation of the Polish Nation – Polish League represented the moderate right of the post-communist Poland. Because of this, the party had hostile relations with far-right parties such as the League of Polish Families (LPR). The ONP-LP faced numerous allegations and accusations from the far-right nationalist camp, such as the accusations of being a party controlled by Jews and Freemasons. In 2005, the ONP-LP condemned the League of Polish Families for the attacks and noted its association with antisemitic figures such as Jan Kobylański. In 2005, the party released a statement on League of Polish Families:

The role of the LPR in the opposition is not fundamentally different from the ‘opposition’ in the parliament of People's Poland. LPR MPs dazzle their own electorate with patriotic slogans, while for a parliament dominated by post-communists, they are a convenient ‘opposition’, lending credence to the political pluralism of the post-communist state. The League of Polish Families deliberately harms the ONP-LP. For example, Maciej Giertych spread lies that the Polish League of 1887, as well as the founder of the Polish-Polish ONP-LP and its members, were Freemasons. Similar lies were spread by Mr Wrzodak in Chicago. On similar deceptions and lies the LPR won its electorate especially in southern Poland. Many compatriots at home and abroad cannot understand how honest Poles could promote this artificial political creation, which, together with others in parliament, discredits us Poles and exposes us to ridicule.

=== Relations with the left ===
The party became a part of the Patriotic Front of the Socialist Left (Polish: Patriotyczny Front Lewicy Socjalistycznej) in 2003, a political alliance of small left-wing parties that sought to create a broad front with national formations, including the right-leaning ones such as the ONP-LP. The Patriotic Front sought to win over nationalist voters over to the left; one of its declarations included: "Let us not be fooled into thinking that the discussion around homosexuality, feminism or even abortion is a marker of the left!" One of the issues that the ONP-LP was able to find common ground with leftist parties on was opposition to globalization. One of the statements of the Patriotic Front repeated by ONP-LP argued that "globalism is the highest stage of capitalism and imperialism, based on the dominance of private property".

The Patriotic Front opposed the 1990s reforms that transitioned Poland to a capitalist free market economy, arguing that while the Polish governments of the 1990s promised a "free, prosperous and democratic Poland", the reforms instead resulted in massive unemployment, loss of social rights, poverty, the collapse of health service and wealth inequality. The alliance proposed policies such as taxation of 'excessive wealth', increasing the minimum wage, restoring the social benefits of the communist Poland, and state control of the economy. The Patriotic Front also argued that the Polish entrance into the European Union resulted in loss of economic sovereignty of Poland, which "may even threaten the loss of its own statehood". The parties of the alliance signed a declaration arguing that Poland has become dominated by foreign capital and is now a "quasi-colony". It also condemned policies such as privatisation and allowing foreign capital in Poland, and proposed protectionist laws as well as ban on foreign ownership in important industries.

=== Euroscepticism ===
Ever since its founding, the party was opposed to Polish membership in the European Union and campaigned for the 'No' vote in the 2003 Polish European Union membership referendum. The party continued to oppose Poland being a part of the Union after the referendum passed as well, arguing that the EU is dominated by Germany and renders Poland an inferior member that is subject to economic domination and exploitation by wealthier members. The ONP-LP decried, amongst others, the "theft of national assets" that it considered a consequence of joining the EU.

The party argued that international organisations such as the European Union seek to undermine the sovereignty of its member states, and that instead of serving the good of nations, they make their members dependent on their will. The ONP-LP claimed that Poland has become a "market of cheap labour" in the EU, as well as "a slum of Europe and a laundry for dirty money". Additionally, the party believed that the EU stifles domestic production of its member states because of the increased exports. As an alternative to the EU, the ONP-LP proposed a policy of neutrality where Poland would seek good relations with both the Western countries as well as Eastern ones like China and Russia, instead of aligning itself with the interests of a single bloc.

=== 2005 program ===
The political program of the party presented for the 2005 Polish presidential election used slogans such as ‘Together with Polonia’, ‘With Polonia into a better future’ and ‘A good host for Poland, caring for Poles at home and in exile’. The party mainly focused on economic nationalism, arguing that banks should be nationalized and that the Polish state should provide universal healthcare and provide free prescripted medicine. The ideological declaration of the party included points such as:

- holding "traitors and political impostors" to account and trial;
- restoring state ownership to strategic state industries and sectors;
- banning foreign ownership of Polish natural resources;
- creating an electoral constituency for the Polish diaspora;
- expanding state media to "represent the vital interests of the Polish people".

== See also ==
- Ancestral Home
- Self-Defence of the Polish Nation
- National Party "Fatherland"
- Catholic Electoral Committee "Fatherland"
- Patriotic Self-Defence
- Catholic Electoral Action
