= Self-Defence of the Polish Nation =

Self-Defence of the Polish Nation Samoobrona Narodu Polskiego
- Abbreviation: SNP
- Leader: Tadeusz Mazanek
- Founded: 27 July 2003
- Registered: 15 July 2005
- Dissolved: 6 February 2023
- Split from: SRP
- Headquarters: ul. Wczasowa 16E/5, 40-694 Katowice
- Membership (2006): 2000
- Ideology: National agrarianism National Catholicism; Anti-capitalism; Hard Euroscepticism
- Political position: Right-wing
- Religion: Roman Catholic
- Colours: Gold; White; Red
- Sejm: 0 / 460
- Senate: 0 / 100
- European Parliament: 0 / 51
- Regional assemblies: 0 / 552
- City presidents: 0 / 117

Website
- http://samoobronanarodupolskiego.friko.pl

Self-Defence of the Polish Nation (Polish: Samoobrona Narodu Polskiego, SNP), later Defence of the Polish Nation (Polish: Obrona Narodu Polskiego, ONP) was a minor political party in Poland. The party registered on 15 July 2005 and was a split of 70 members from the left-wing agrarian socialist Self-Defence of the Republic of Poland (Polish: Samoobrona Rzeczpospolitej Polskiej, SRP, referred to as Samoobrona), though the party already existed as a dissident faction within the party since 2003. The party tried to participate in the 2006 Polish local elections and act as a spoiler party against Samoobrona, but the Polish court struck the party off the ballot because of its name and logo being too similar to SRP. In response, the party changed its name to "Defence of the Polish Nation" in October 2006.

The Self-Defence of the Polish Nation was a right-nationalist split from Samoobrona and was found in response to the "social-democratisation" of the party, which transitioned from a populist protest party to an established, staunchly left-wing one. The SNP already held its own party convention in 2003, where it protested Samoobrona's decision to work together with social-democratic Labour Union and Democratic Left Alliance, but it remained a faction within the party until formally seceding and registering a separate political entity in 2005. It was the first of many splits within Samoobrona that occurred between 2005 and 2007, such as Patriotic Self-Defence and Self-Defence Social Movement. After the change name in 2006, the party would participate in subsequent Polish elections and win a marginal number of votes. It became inactive in early 2020s and was dissolved and deregistered in early 2023.

== History ==
Self-Defence of the Polish Nation first appeared in 2003, when 70 members of Samoobrona convened in Katowice. The convention criticized the confidence and supply agreement that Samoobrona reached with Labour Union and Democratic Left Alliance, two centre-left social-democratic parties. Convention members argued that vote of confidence for Leszek Miller was against the will of the portion of the party, as seven Samoobrona MPs were absent during the vote. However, no formal secession was declared from Samoobrona, and the convention merely declared itself an autonomous faction within the party.

Samoobrona was founded in 1992 and was not a conventional political party, but rather described itself as "peasants’ social movement emerging on the basis of peasants’ discontent". It steadily rose in popularity as an anti-establishment movement protesting the economic shock therapy and neoliberal Balcerowicz Plan, which carried out extensive free-market reforms in Poland and dissolved the socialist economy and welfare state. As the reforms led to numerous protests, road blocks and hunger strikes, Samoobrona rapidly developed through direct and grass-roots actions, and got involved in Polish trade union movement. Samoobrona positioned itself as an anti-establishment movement, running "against neoliberalism, against capitalism, against ruling elites, against the urban intellectual bias of Polish politics."

The party represented a big tent of the 'losers' of the capitalist transition, and its program mixed socioeconomic issues with moral ones. Amongst the early demands of the party was an economic system that would replace materialism and consumerism with a closer relationship with the natural environment, preservation of small family farms, and humane treatment of animals. Samoobrona promoted its concept of "econology", which it described as the introduction of social ethics and morality into economic thinking. Effectively the party called for a 'just' economy based on agrarian, ethical and anti-capitalist principles, which it more strictly formulated in its 1993 program, which stated: "We want a Poland, in which there will not be such drastic material differences: no so-called ‘ocean of destitution’ with tiny ‘islands’ of wealth and well-being." Capitalism introduced in Poland in the 1990s was denounced by the party as "economic genocide".

Despite the class-based rhetoric of the party, the far-left character of Samoobrona was not apparent to some of its supporters, and above its programmatic stances it represented a 'fresh wind' in Polish politics that stood above the post-communist and anti-communist political divide that defined 1990s and early 2000s Polish politics. Because of this, the party had a diverse coalition of supports, including not only socialists, but also the military and nationalists, who shared the party's aversion to the liberal international order that was now also present in Poland. Samoobrona tolerated the nationalist wings of its supporters as it pursued a strategy of developing a wide spectrum of interests, appealing to workers, the unemployed, pensioners and the poor, resulting in the party becoming a "loose organization that engaged in a non-conventional, protest profile"; the main ideology of the party was simply described as “healthy [economical] development, the care for disfavoured people and the national interest."

However, Samoobrona eschwed its vague position in favour of developing a clearly defined far-left ideology in 1999. That year, the leader of the party Andrzej Lepper called for a "worker-peasant alliance" and increasingly marginalized and dismissed the nationalist wing of the party. In February 1999, Lepper also called for return to socialism during his presidential campaign, arguing that it had "not yet reached full maturity". International media would describe Lepper as "Polish Hugo Chávez", comparing and finding similarities with their socialist and populist rhetoric. Samoobrona itself was described as a mixture of "social Catholicism and Polish socialism". After its triumph in the 2001 Polish parliamentary election, the far-left character of the party was also noted by political scientists - Andrzej Antoszewski described the party as a neocommunist party with unique ethical socialist and Catholic socialist characteristics - the party's program from 2001 called for 'economic revival' and the abandonment of "satanistic values" defined as "pursuit of profit, getting rich, cruel competition, degenerate consumerism, total commercialisation and disdain for the weak"; capitalism was described the party as "fiscal terror" imposed on the poor.

By mid-2000s, Samoobrona came to be considered to be on the extreme end of left-wing politics in Poland, and its voters were found to be more left-wing than those of any other political party in Poland, and of non-voters as well. Termed "social-democratization", this transformation of Samoobrona from a broad protest party to a far-left established formation further alienated Self-Defence of the Polish Nation, which already declared itself a dissident faction within the party in 2003.

The party held its second convention in Katowice in June 2005, this time as a separate, registered party. The head of the new party, elected as the chairman of the party's "supreme committee", was Tadeusz Mazanek. Mazanek was elected councillor of the Silesian Voivodship Assembly from the Samoobrona list in 2002 Polish local elections, and ran on the party list in the 2001 Polish parliamentary election, but did not win a seat. He became known amongst Silesian circles in 2000, when he led a nationalist demonstration through the streets of Katowice. Other party founders included Antoni Waleczek, Józef Pankiewicz, Czesław Kiernozek and Stefan Besz. By 2006, the party had three provincial representatives in regional sejmiks - these were Tadeusz Mazanek and Antoni Waleczek in the Silesian assembly, and Stefan Besz in the Opole assembly. Mazanek registered the party on 15 June 2005, two years after its first convention in July 2003.

In late 2005, the party published a public announcement in which it justified its decision to separate from Samoobrona, stating: "Andrzej Lepper's party Self-Defence of the Republic of Poland, which grew on a wave of social discontent, failed its rank-and-file members, so we decided to establish a new political formation called Self-Defence of the Polish Nation." The SNP then held another meeting in village of Chróścielów, where it elected its party council as well - Stefan Besz became the chairman of the party's council in the Opole regional assembly, and Tomasz Bedryj was elected his deputy. Jan Siniakiewicz became the secretary of the party, and Elżbieta Zapotoczna was elected the new party's treasurer. The party encouraged "all those who are not indifferent to the fate of Poland to join and actively work in the field structures of the newly established party".

In the 2005 Polish parliamentary election, SNP member Mirosław Chandrała ran for the Sejm in the Łódź constituency from the list of the All-Polish Civic Coalition (Polish: Ogólnopolska Koalicja Obywatelska), a minor electoral formation that called for the introduction of social market economy in Poland. He received 38 votes. In the presidential elections of 2005, the party supported Polish diaspora activists Jan Pyszko, who was the party leader of the Organisation of the Polish Nation - Polish League, a political Catholic that represented Polish minority interests abroad. The SNP also consolidated its position by absorbing the "Self-Defence of Merchants and Traders Association" (Polish: Samoobrona Kupców i Handlowców), which operated in opposition to Samoobrona in Lublin and had 500 members, who decided to disband the party and join the SNP. The party considered running together with the Organisation of the Polish Nation - Polish League for 2005 election, but this plan never materialized.

By 2006, the party had 2,000 members. The party leadership decided to participate in the 2006 Polish local elections and challenge Samoobrona for its seats in local councils. According to a poll from August 2005, the party polled 6% for parliamentary election and would enter the Sejm with 25 seats. For comparison, the parent party Samoobrona who formed an alliance with democratic socialist National Party of Retirees and Pensioners polled 8%, and would gain 44 seats. However, Samoobrona accused the SNP of trying to impersonate the party, and filed a lawsuit against the SNP which it accused of trying to disorient the voters with similar name and program. Shortly before the 2006 election, Polish court ruled in favour of Samoobrona and struck Self-Defence of the Polish Nation off the ballot for being a spoiler party. While the party was not allowed to field its own lists, it endorsed independent candidates, such as Roman Chomicki representing the "Electoral Committee of the Movement for the Elimination of Unemployment" (Polish: Komitet Wyborczy Wyborców Ruch Likwidacji Bezrobocia), who won under 1% of the popular vote.

SNP was also included in a corruption scandal in Samoobrona, as several of the SNP members accusing Samoobrona of using a "pay to run" system which demanded candidates to pay the party in order to be able to run on the party's electoral list. This accusation was lodged by Self-Defence of the Polish Nation against Samoobrona MP Alfred Budner, who was to demand money from local activists in order to secure a place on the party's electoral lists. In 2007, Bunder himself left Samoobrona and joined the newly-formed Self-Defence Rebirth. Self-Defence Rebirth wanted to consolidate Samoobrona splinters under its banner and reached out to all minor parties with "Self-Defence" in their name, including the SNP. However, the cooperation was never realized as Self-Defence Rebirth declared that it will be "as left-wing as Samoobrona was", therefore consolidating its nature as a left-wing splinter rather than a right-wing one.

The party continued to participate in elections after 2006. In the 2007 Polish parliamentary election, the party fielded a single candidate for the Senate in Bielsko-Biała constituency - Antoni Waleczek. Waleczek received 12,908 votes in total and came last out of 7 candidates for the seat. In the 2014 Polish local elections, the party's leader Tadeusz Mazanek was a candidate of the "Outraged " (Polish: Oburzeni) committee for the Silesian Sejmik, with the committee's lists also including people associated with minor conservative parties. In the 2018 Polish local elections, Mazenek was the first candidate of a minor political party known as the Labour Party in Katowice council. However, he received 0.3% of the vote and failed to gain a seat. The party did not participate in any elections after 2019 and stopped submitting financial reports to Polish courts aftwerwards. The party was then formally deregistered and dissolved in February 2023.

== Party leadership ==
Leader:

- Tadeusz Mazanek

Co-founders:

- Antoni Waleczek
- Józef Pankiewicz
- Czesław Kiernozek
- Stefan Besz

Secretary:

- Jan Siniakiewicz

Treasurer:

- Elżbieta Zapotoczna

== Ideology ==
The party was described as a right-wing nationalist split of the Samoobrona party. It split from Samoobrona over the party's decision to cooperate with social-democratic parties and increasingly apparent far-left nature of Samoobrona. The party itself claimed to continue the legacy of Samoobrona, and described itself as "patriotic" and "of peasant origin". This referred not only to the agrarian character of Samoobrona, but also echoed Samoobrona's statements - in 2005, Andrzej Lepper described Samoobrona as "the patriotic left, a progressive left, modern, tolerant, without any extremes or deviations". The SNP was anti-capitalist and followed the moralist rhetoric of Samoobrona, although devoid of left-wing slogans; Self-Defence of the Polish Nation argued that "there has been a degeneration of social and economic life in the country [of Poland]" and warned: "If the capitalists do not stop plundering us then a serious social crisis could occur."

The agrarian, nationalist and anti-capitalist of the party was stressed in an overwhelming majority of its statements. The party that the SNP seceded from, Samoobrona, was accused of "having forgotten the countryside". The SNP argued that both Samoobrona and the Polish economy are controlled by "latifundists" and called for redistributive measures that would nationalize the property of large landowners and redistribute it to the poor, envisioning small and family farms to be the ideal of Polish agricultural organisation. To this end, the party called for the reversal of privatisations carried out by the Polish government, calling them "unclean" and proposing to instate death penalty as a punishment for corruption.

The party had a national, Catholic, conservative and Eurosceptic policies, and it advocated Poland's exit from the European Union and NATO. It called for an ambitious program of nationalization of Poland, which the party advertised by slogans such as "land for peasants" and "factories for workers". The SNP opposed economic and political ties with the West, and was particularly opposed to the European Union and Germany. Instead, the party proposed to develop ties with Poland's eastern neighbours such as Belarus. It also opposed Polish participation in the Iraq War because of its anti-NATO sentiment, and argued that the Polish people had lost out on the war.

The SNP also echoed nationalist and populist sentiments, and referred to itself as a nationalist and patriotic party devoted to Polish nation. It presented itself as the 'real' Samoobrona, accusing its parent party (Self-Defence of the Republic of Poland) as betraying its own program and engaging in corruption. The leader of the SNP, Mazanek, stated: "It is Lepper's Samoobrona that is being impersonated. The newly established Samoobrona is called Samoobrona Narodu Polskiego [Self-Defence of the Polish Nation] because the nation is the subject and its good is the main objective of the party's activity. The programme that Mr Lepper is pursuing is at odds with his ideological declaration."

== See also ==
- Self-Defence of the Republic of Poland
- Patriotic Self-Defense
- League of Polish Families
- Self-Defence Rebirth
- Self-Defence Social Movement
- Peasants' Party (Poland)
- Party of Regions (Poland)
