= Party of Regions (Poland) =

Party of Regions Partia Regionów
- Abbreviation: PR
- Leader: Bolesław Borysiuk
- Founder: Krzysztof Filipek
- Founded: 24 November 2007
- Registered: 25 February 2008
- Dissolved: 16 January 2017
- Split from: SRP
- Headquarters: Szlachecka 48, 03-259 Warsaw
- Youth wing: Sekcja Młodych Partii Regionów
- Membership (2008): 2000
- Ideology: Agrarianism; Socialism; Anti-neoliberalism; Social market economy Regionalism; Left-wing nationalism
- Political position: Left-wing
- National affiliation: Democratic Left Alliance
- Colours: Blue; Yellow; Green

Website
- http://www.partiaregionow.pl/

The Party of Regions (Polish: Partia Regionów, PR) was a left-wing Polish non-parliamentary political party created in November 2007 and registered in February 2008. The Party of Regions was created by former members of Self-Defence and the Democratic Left Alliance after the parliamentary election in 2007, when Self-Defence support collapsed to far less than the 5% electoral threshold giving them no seats in the new legislature. Founders of the grouping included Krzysztof Filipek, Danuta Hojarska and Bolesław Borysiuk. For failure to disclose their financial records for the year 2015, on 16 January 2017 the party was struck off from the register of political parties.

According to the founders' declaration, the party was to be governed decentralistically, respecting the decisions of the field authorities and recognising the supremacy of the congress over the party board. In October 2008, Party of Regions activists linked to agriculture announced the establishment of the Trade Union of Agriculture and Rural Areas "Regions", which was formed a month later. (led, among others, by Renata Beger). Danuta Hojarska and Krzysztof Filipek left the party after some time. The party initially cooperated with (mainly national) right-wing parties, but then became an ally of the SLD. The party described itself as the "patriotic left".

The party strongly supported regionalism and wanted to revive local and regional traditions in Poland, as well as promote and encourage regional patriotism. The party envisioned a decentralised Poland full of "regional, small homelands", advocating a strongly decentralised, regionalised structure. The Party of Regions argued that Poland was too centralised and believed that poor Polish regions were being exploited by wealthier ones as cheap labour. The party's aim was to develop and invest in the poorest regions and make them seft-sufficient rather than dependent on bailouts from the wealthier regions. The power of national government was to be significantly reduced and the regions were to act as self-sovereign entities that would cooperate with each other on the basis of equal partnerships and "solidarity-based" support.

== History ==
The electoral defeat of Self-Defence of the Republic of Poland resulted in a significant reduction in party membership, both in the regions and among the well-known politicians of the hitherto dominating party. Krzysztof Filipek, hitherto deputy chairman of Self-Defence, parted ways with the party in 2007 by forming the Party of Regions.

The founders of the new party believed that the party of Andrzej Lepper was incapable of "incapable of post-election reflection and shows no will to change its image". The main goal of the Party of Regions was to create a party free of "politically and morally compromised persons". Because those who defected to the Party of Regions believed that Self-Defence was too centralised, the principle of Party of Regions' functioning was to be intra-party democracy and respect for the need for discussion before every decision was taken.

The defections from Self-Defence to Party of Regions varied heavily from region to region. In the Pomeranian Voivodeship, out of about 1500 members, 90% defected to the Party of Regions, forcing the local Self-Defence assembly to dissolve the party structure in the region. This was in stark contrast to Lublin Voivodeship, where the party only had 265 members by 2008. The new party also devastated the regional structure of Self-Defence in Świętokrzyskie Voivodeship, where Self-Defence membership fell from 1500 to 30. The founder of PR, Filipek, strongly emphasised that his party will be organised in a much more decentralised and democratic manner than Self-Defence, stressing that decisions would be made "at the bottom, in the districts of the provinces". The party was determined to decisively move away from the style of governance that existed in Self-Defence.

In December 2007, the party started cooperating with agrarian trade unions, and created the Farmers' Trade Union, a decision that was announced by Krzysztof Filipek, the chairman of the Party of Regions. Filipek stressed that new trade union is "not created for the party and the leadership will not overlap here", referring to the situation in trade unions associated with Self-Defence, where the head of both the party and the farmers' union was Andrzej Lepper. The trade union was created to pressure the Minister of Agriculture Marek Sawicki, believed to have been neglecting the interests of Polish farmers.

In the 2009 European Parliament election in Poland, the party ran jointly with, among others, League of Polish Families, Forward Poland, Piast Faction, Libertas Poland, Christian National Union and the Organisation of the Polish Nation - Polish League as part of the Libertas Committee, which did not reach the electoral threshold. Among the candidates of the Party of Regions, the best result was achieved by chairman Bolesław Borysiuk (1310 votes), while other party activists received the support of no more than a few hundred voters.

On 27 April 2010, the party's National Executive Committee called on party supporters and sympathisers to support the candidacy of Grzegorz Napieralski from Democratic Left Alliance in the 2010 Polish presidential election. The party stated: "The decision to support Grzegorz Napieralski was decisively influenced by the fact that he is a representative of the Polish patriotic left, effectively working towards goals that are important for the entire left-wing formation, and a representative of the young generation, striving to make the vision of a fair and evenly developed Poland a reality". In the second round, the party did not support any of the candidates.

Following the results of the election, the party congratulated Bronisław Komorowski on his victory in the election and congratulated Grzegorz Napieralski, whom the party endorsed, on achieving a relatively high number of votes. The party praised Napieraski as the candidate "of the modern, young, patriotic left". The party encouraged Komorowski to change his stance on "the future and place of the modern left in Poland". The party also praised Komorowski for recognising the negative consequences of privatisation and moving away from his plans to privatise health services. The party closed its statement by advising the president to address rural and youth poverty.

In May 2010, the party created its youth wing, Youth Section of the Party of Regions (Polish: Sekcja Młodych Partii Regionów), which declared that "as young people, we have a special right to demand equal opportunities and equal treatment of the development needs of the regions - our small homelands". The party also participated in the International Workers' Day with several other left-wing parties, proclaiming an informal political front that would bring back political left into relevance and prevent the apparent rightwards shift of Polish politics. Members of the joint front with Party of Regions were SLD, Social Democracy of Poland, Labour Union, Polish Socialist Party, Reason Party, 8th March Women Alliance, Greens 2004 and Edward Gierek's Economic Revival Movement.

In June 2010, the party mobilised its ranks and joined with associated agrarian trade unions in order to aid the victims of the 2010 Central European floods in Poland. The party participated in the relief effort and called for other parties and associations to organise help, declaring that Polish political parties "cannot remain indifferent to this misfortune".

Before the 2010 Polish local elections, activists of the Party of Regions decided to run jointly with the Democratic Left Alliance. On the basis of this agreement, Halina Molka, Alicja Lis, Józef Głowa, Anna Brózda and Tadeusz Urban were included on the Alliance's electoral lists as representatives of the Party of Regions. Both parties published a joint declaration explaining the reason behind their alliance: "Poland has wandered too far to the right. The values of the left are pushed to the margins of social debate. Instead, the ideas of the extreme right are resounding, bringing our country into disrepute and doing irreparable harm to it." Party of Regions candidates also ran on behalf of local committees. In total, the party fielded 467 candidates in the elections (in 9 provinces). They won a total of 82,818 votes, which gave 38 councillor seats in 7 voivodeships (8 seats in city councils, 14 in county councils and 16 in municipal councils). 1 party candidate was elected as mayor. All seats were won by candidates representing local committees.

In September 2010, the Party of Regions initatied a coalition with the Democratic Left Alliance (SLD) and formed a joint electoral bloc in Mazovia. Afterwards, the representatives of PR came to an agreement with Democratic Left Alliance to sign a joint programmdeclaration, which took place during the inauguration of the election campaign at the turn of September and October. The Party of Regions put forward 52 of its members to SLD, who were to be included on the electoral lists for the sejmiks. Bolesław Borysiuk declared that a total of 500 members of the Party of Regions ran on SLD electoral lists. Describing the decision to cooperate so closely with the SLD, Borysiuk explained that the Party of Regions is the "patriotic left".

On 22 March 2011, the Party of Regions signed an agreement to run jointly in the 2011 Polish parliamentary election with the National Party of Retirees and Pensioners and the Democratic Association (the Paweł Piskorski part of the Democratic Party opposing the leadership). In the end, a joint run-off did not take place and several representatives of the Party of Regions found themselves on the SLD lists. The candidates for the Sejm were: Anna Brózda in the Katowice district, Marian Curyło in the Kielce district and Bogdan Solarz in the Kraków district. Party chairman Bolesław Borysiuk became the SLD candidate for the Senate in the Lublin district. None of the Party of Regions activists gained a seat in parliament.

On 12 October 2013, the Party of Regions and its activist ZZRiOW "Regions" co-founded the Social Agreement "Zmiana" together with Polish Left, Polish Socialist Party and the Movement of Working People. The PPS (which entered into an alliance with the Green Party) was later replaced in "Change" by the RP Pensioners' Party. 'Change' organisations did not participate in the 2014 European Parliament election in Poland.

During the 2014 Polish local elections, the Party of Regions participated in the SLD-Left Together coalition; its activists were, among others, on the lists for provincial assemblies.

On 18 April 2015, the grouping signed a programme agreement under the name Alternative for Poland together with the Polish Left and the nascent Zmiana party (Polish Left later formed an alliance with other parties). In the 2015 Polish parliamentary election, these parties did not run.

In its final years, the party also participated in a joint conference of Polish left-wing parties organised by the Progress Forum. The conference included parties such as the SLD, PPS, Labour Union, Party of Regions as well as other left-wing associatins and foundations. The party signed a joint ideological declaration, stating commitment to left-wing values defined as the ideals of "social justice, a social market economy, self-government, the idea of a secular state". The statement also included heavy criticism of neoliberalism, and the declaration that "the left should criticise the historical policy of the right and respond with its own narrative concerning the past", especially "the attitude to the achievements of People's Poland".

As a result of failing to submit a financial report for 2015, on 16 January 2017 the Party of Regions was deleted from the register of political parties.

== Structure and activists ==
According to the party's statutes, the highest organ of the party was the National Congress. The other statutory organs of the party were the Political Council, the President, the National Executive Committee, the National Peer Court and the National Audit Commission.

The founder and first leader of the party was Krzysztof Filipek, who became the chairman of the party. Danuta Hojarska became the deputy chairman of the party, while Andrzej Grzesik became the general secretary. The party was founded together with former Democratic Left Alliance activists - Maciej Archaniołowicz, a former SLD member, became the treasurer of the Party of Regions. Other members of the new party included Andrzej Grzesik, Norbert Drozd, Józef Stępkowski, Bolesław Borysiuk, Lech Szymańczyk, Janusz Wójcik, Wiesław Marzec and regional activists from the Pomorskie, Mazowieckie, Świętokrzyskie and Kielce voivodeships.

The party had a heavily decentralised and regionalised structure, with strength of the party drastically varying from region to region. In the Pomeranian Voivodeship, the party had over 1000 members, as over 90% of former Self-Defence members joined it, leading Self-Defence to completely dissolve its local party structure in the region. The party was much weaker in Lublin Voivodeship, where it had 265 members. The party aimed to create "a new quality" and move away from "the style of governance that was in Self-Defence", announcing a democratic structure where decisions "at the bottom, in the districts, provinces, counties".

The basic organisational unit of the Party of Regions was a "circle" (Polish: koło), operating in a specific area or community. Circles could operate at the level of a municipality, district, village, or a city. Circles were allowed to join to carry out joint tasks. Each circle was required to have at least five members, and could be formed by the local District Party Council as long as there were at least five party members willing to join.

The party was organised on the principle of a term-limited democracy - all party authorities were term-limited and were elected by secret ballot, once every 4 years by simple majority. By-elections to authorities caused by vacancies were to follow the same procedure. Voting took place for individual candidates and the candidates receiving the highest number of votes were consecutively deemed elected. The party had regional, highly autonomous and self-governing councils, known as the Regional Congress (Polish: Kongres Regionu) and the Regional Council (Polish: Rada Regionu). Regional Congress was the legislative council, while the Regional Council had executive powers.

The party also had its youth wing known as the Youth Section of the Party of Regions (Polish: Sekcja Młodych Partii Regionów). The main declaration of the youth wing was: "As young people, we have a special right to demand equal opportunities and equal treatment of the development needs of the regions - our small homelands". The youth wing of the party closely cooperated with the left-wing SLD party - in 2010, the wing met with Marek Wikiński - chief of staff of the presidential candidate Grzegorz Napieralski, to whom they submitted the "Appeal of the Young Section of the Party of the Regions", calling on the young generation of Poles to support Grzegorz Napieralski, praising him as the youngest candidate for the highest office in Poland.

== Party presidents ==
- from 19 December 2007 to 18 April 2009 - Krzysztof Filipek (acting president)
- from 18 April 2009 to 16 January 2017 - Bolesław Borysiuk

== Ideology ==
Party of Regions was a left-wing party. The party closely cooperated with social-democratic parties such as the Democratic Left Alliance and the Left Together, while also having ties with Piotr Ikonowicz of the Polish Socialist Party. The founder of the party, Krzysztof Filipek, described the party as "the true left, the one that that stands on the side of ordinary people". The party defined itself as the "patriotic left", echoing the rhetoric of its original party, Self-Defence. In addition, PR also described itself as "the modern left" and a "new quality on the left side of the political scene". The party also expressed its respect for the communist Polish People's Republic, especially in regards to "the achievements of generations of people working in People's Poland".

The party is also considered socialist. The leader of the party, Bolesław Borysiuk, is a former member of the Polish–Soviet Friendship Society and was reported to "manifest his belief in the ideals of socialism". After joining Self-Defence in late 1990s, Borysiuk established himself as an economic expert and an ardent advocate of reestablishing economic cooperation with Russia and Belarus. The future members of the Party of Regions belonged to a post-communist wing of Samoobrona, composed of former Ministry of Interior and Administration. Self-Defence did consider itself socialist, and was also described as such by political scientists such as Sarah de Lange, Gerrit Voerman and Rafał Pankowski. Usage of socialist terms such as "comrades" and "party apparatus" was common in the Party of Regions.

The relatively positive attitude towards the communist era of Poland is largely consistent with the rhetoric and image of the Self-Defence party - Samoobrona was also considered to be the party closest aligned with the fallen pre-1989 communist regime; Mirosław Karwat called the party "probably the only political party that speaks well of Communist Poland", while Piotr Długosz considered the party an "heir of the communist regime". Sławomir Drelich notes that Self-Defence of the Republic of Poland also portrayed communist Poland as superior to the post-1989 capitalist one, and calls the party "the most post-communist party on the Polish political scene". A 2003 survey by CBOS found that the majority of party's supporters wished Poland could have retained communist economy.

The Party of Regions also reaffirmed its left-wing stance by joining parties such as the Polish Socialist Party and the Labour Union in a joint left-wing ideological declaration, pledging to include the following declarations in its program:

- the absence of left-wing values in state policy threatens the implementation of constitutional values based, inter alia, on the ideas of social justice, a social market economy, self-government, the idea of a secular state and democracy and individual freedom;
- the policy of the left so far, e.g. the state of realisation of social values, economic policy, the quality of democracy, the attitude to neo-liberalism, should be re-evaluated and changed;
- the left should criticise the historical policy of the right and respond with its own narrative concerning the past, e.g. the attitude to the achievements of People's Poland;
- the left should come to an agreement within its own camp over divisions (ideological, historical, attitude to the practice of transformation) and be together in important moments.

In its statute, the Party of Regions defined itself as a political party that "encompasses all strata of society with its political, social and economic activities, and has a special concern for the poorest people, those in need of assistance and those affected by disabilities"; additionally, the Party of Regions announced that it was "established to represent the interests and defend the rights of farmers who run a farm and their relatives permanently working on the farm, for whom the Polish countryside and agriculture are a part of the Polish national identity and tradition worth supporting and defending". Statute goals of the party were, amongst others, encouraging active participation of rural residents in local government activities, campaigning for universally accessible health care for the rural population, and promotion of the traditions of the Polish peasant and trade-union movements.

One of the main goals of Party of Regions was to focus mainly on agricultural and rural environments, and otherwise the party aspired to largely follow the ideology and program of Andrzej Lepper and his Self-Defence party. Krzysztof Filipek announced that the "theses, postulates and messages" of Andrzej Lepper are also to be followed by the Party of Regions. The party was also highly critical of the right-wing Law and Justice, accusing it of further impoverishing poor regions while also neglecting rural interests.

The party was anti-neoliberal, accusing the neo-liberal economic model and the associated Balcerowicz plan of leading to massive debt and the spectre of bankruptcy, stating: "The neo-liberal financial and customs policies pursued since 1990 have led state and cooperative enterprises into massive debt and the spectre of bankruptcy". The party also defended the interests of trade unions and blue-collar workers. The Party of Regions called itself "the modern left" and a "new quality on the left side of the political scene". The party also expressed its strong opposition towards privatisation, especially in regards to public media and health services. The party argues that under pressure from the World Bank and the International Monetary Fund, Polish governments accepted solutions that led to a crisis in the state's public finances and an inflationary stranglehold on Polish capital. Party of Regions believes that by adopting a neoliberal economic model, growth was prioritised over the well-being of Polish workers, and that the reforms pursued let to foreign ownership of Polish industry.

In its program, the party expressed its support for regionalist and localist movements, supporting strengthening local and regional traditions, the "patriotic regional awareness" of the inhabitants. The party regarded the sense of pride in belonging and attachment to the historical values of "regional, small homelands" as an important component of civil society. The party openly spoke for promoting regional initiatives, especially regional trade unions and agricultural associations, as well as local parties and leaders that could fight for regional interests and promote regional patriotism. Party of Regions envisioned self-sustainable Polish regions with powerful regional governments and regional control over the economy, with interactions between regions being passed on equal partnership rather than economical dominance of "metropolies".

Party of Regions specifically wished to address the gap between Polish regions that have emerged after 1991, which had only widened instead of narrowing. The party believes that the weaker regions became a source of cheap labour for wealthier ones, and called for a new regional policy to address that. The party advocated a radical change in the relations of Polish regions and regional governments regarding the central government; the party proposed new mechanisms and laws that would establish regional partnerships, "solidarity-based" support for underdeveloped regions, and a revamped socio-economic policy. The party argued that particularly industries such as agriculture, construction, transport, environmental protection, forestry and heavy industry should be managed by regional governments rather than the national one.

The party called for a new economic policy based on the social market economy and the principle of sustainable development. The party stated its intent to create a system that would prioritise human development, education and science over economic growth. In addition, the Party of Regions wanted to implement various regional socio-economic programmes, which would focus on grassroots initiatives in individual regions, "creating regional leaders who will create coherent and beneficial socio-economic programmes for the region and contribute to their effective implementation".

The Party of Regions also opposed stratification of wages and other incomes, criticising the progressive differentiation of living standards between urban and rural areas, and violations of the Polish Labour Code. The party saw the basis for the country's economic recovery in the development of the infrastructure of less developed regions, as well as a social market economy or the development of education and science. She was also opposed to the regions receiving financial aid from rich metropolises, demanding that Polish regions be put on the EU's economic map as significant or leading products:

- Lublin Voivodeship, Subcarpathian Voivodeship, Podlaskie Voivodeship and Świętokrzyskie Voivodeship - eco-agriculture, production of healthy food
- Warmian–Masurian Voivodeship - nature and tourism
- Lower Silesian Voivodeship - automotive industry
- Silesian Voivodeship - coal basin
- Łódź - logistics
- Warsaw - finance

In foreign policy, the Party of Regions was primarily in favour of cooperation with Slavic countries. It saw the moment of Poland's accession to the European Union as the end of a difficult and painful chapter in the systemic transformation, while pointing out that Poland still did not meet the standards of a state of social justice and the rule of law.

The party had a special autonomous sub-structure for Upper Silesia, a region known for its regionalist and autonomist sentiments. The Party of the Regions in Silesia adopted a separate program and separate authorities - Anna Brózda was elected president of the Party of the Regions in Silesia, while Ryszard Obuchowicz and Bogdan Surowiec were chosen to be the vice presidents. The party also had its own spokeswoman for Silesian matters, Jolanta Marondel, a former member of Self-Defence from Katowice.

During the 2010 convention, chairman Bolesław Borysiuk said that the party will seek opportunities for the Polish countryside, stating that the problem is not only in less developed areas, but that better-off areas also encounter difficulties in modernising industry or making use of scientific and technological facilities. In addition to its strongly regionalist rhetoric, the party also stated its commitment to feminism and the interests of those with disabilities. Party of Regions stated its intention to improve the situation of women, people over 50 and young people in particular, announcing a plan to encourage sick and disabled people to stand as candidates in local elections to fight for their interests.

== See also ==
- Democratic Left Alliance
- Patriotic Self-Defence
- Self-Defence of the Republic of Poland
- Self-Defence Rebirth
- Self-Defence Social Movement
- Self-Defence of the Polish Nation
- Politics of Poland
- List of political parties in Poland
