= Chróścielów =

- Village
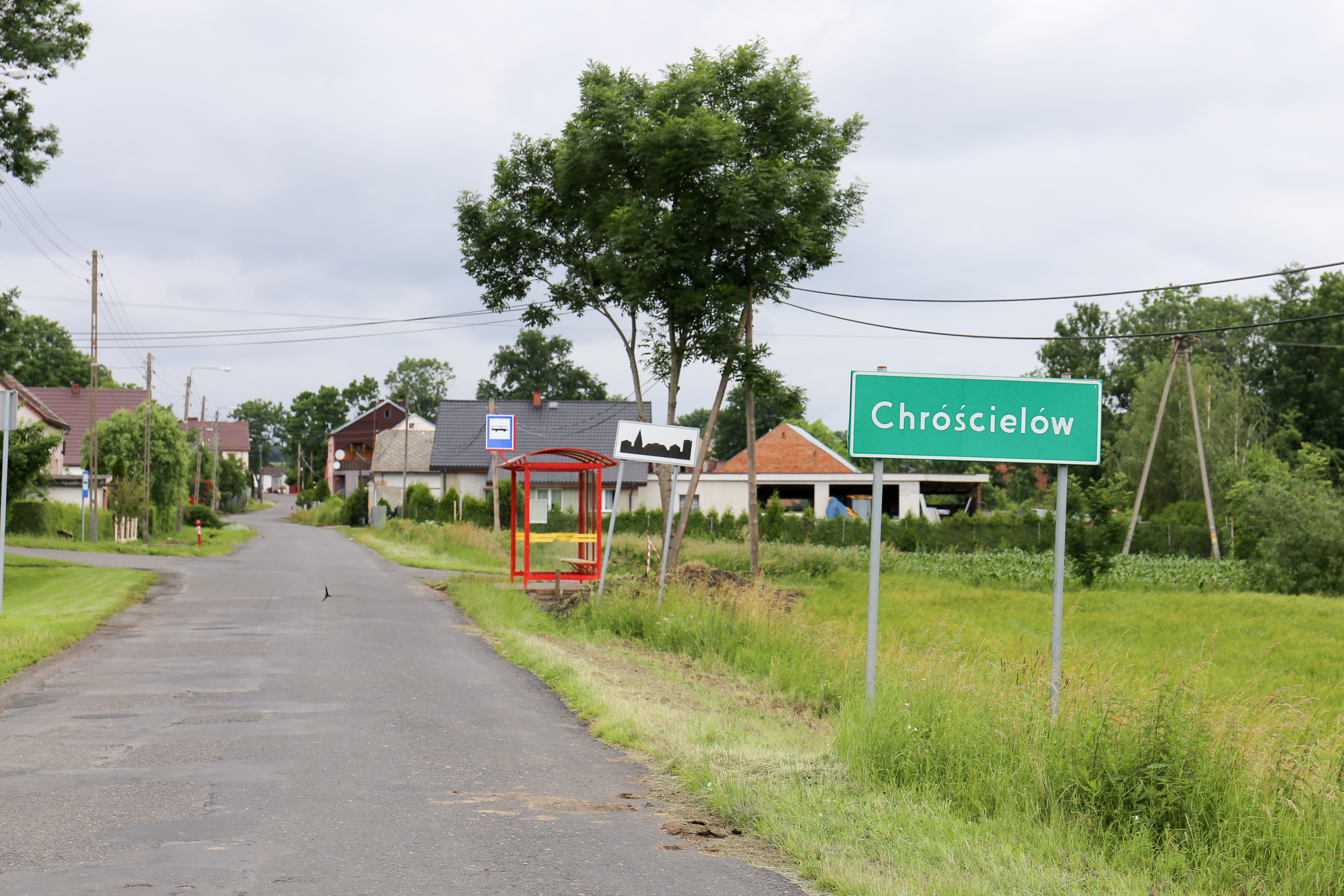
- Chróścielów in 2020

- Location within Poland
- Coordinates: 50°4′N 17°54′E
- Country: Poland
- Voivodeship: Opole
- County: Głubczyce
- Gmina: Kietrz
- Population: 468 (2,007)
- Postal Code: 48-130
- Car plates: OGL
- SIMC: 0495987

Chróścielów [xruɕˈt͡ɕɛluf] is a village in the administrative district of Gmina Kietrz, within Głubczyce County, Opole Voivodeship, in south-western Poland, close to the Czech border.
