= 2006 Polish local elections =

Election in Poland

2006 Polish regional assembly election
← 2002	12 November 2006 (first round); 26 November 2006 (second round)	2010 →

561 seats to regional assemblies
- Registered: 30,241,176
- Turnout: 13,884,295 (45.91%) ▲1.68pp
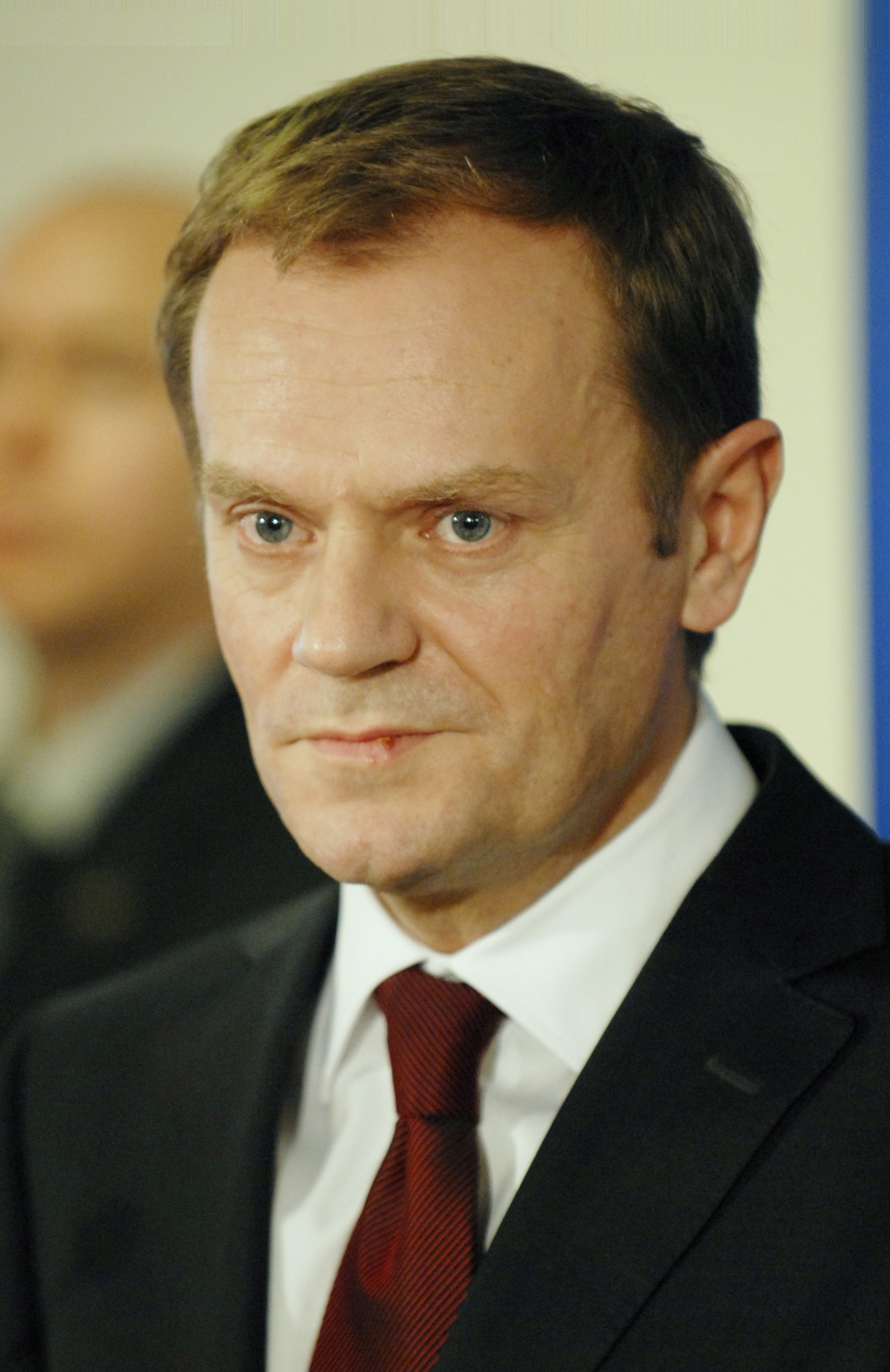

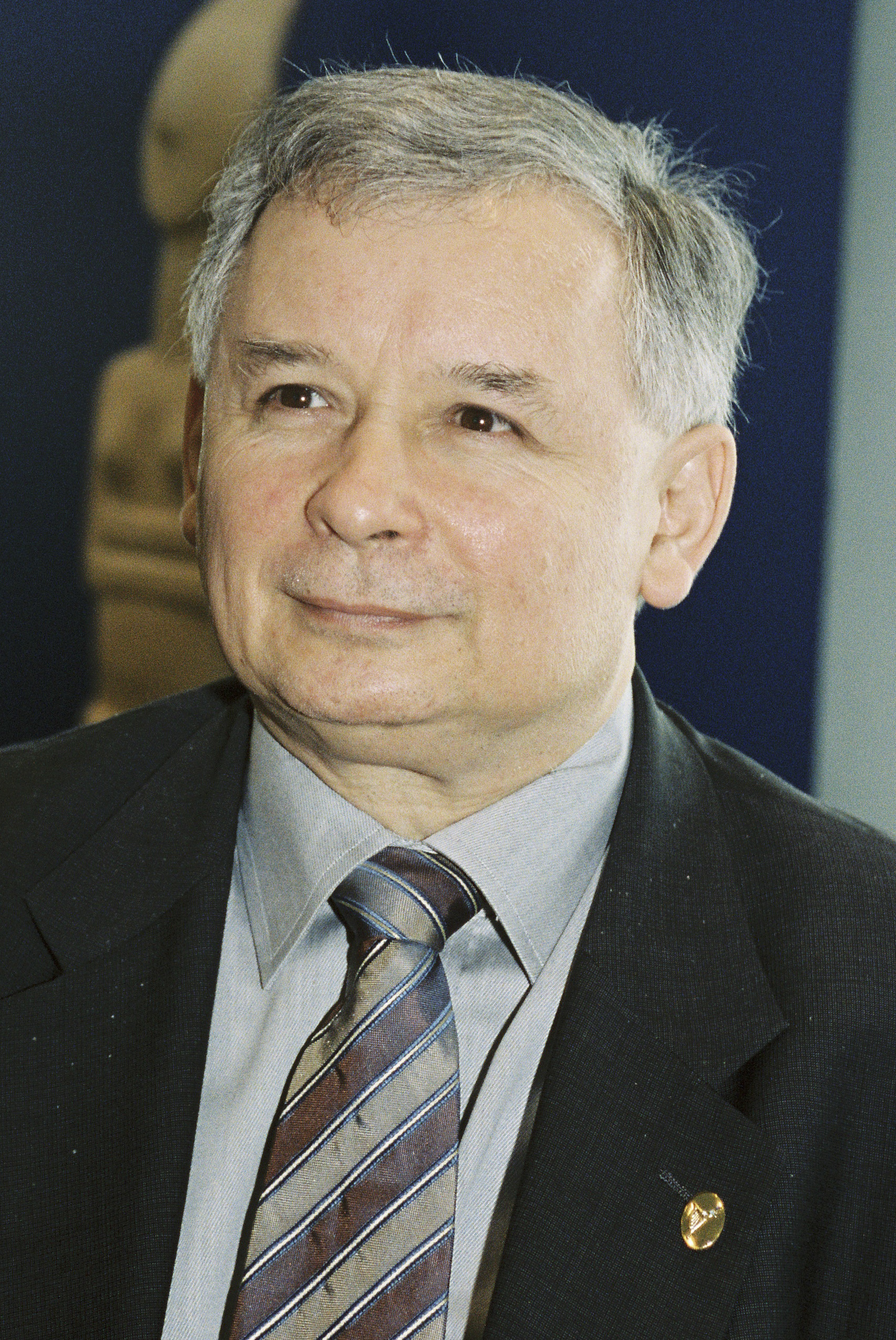

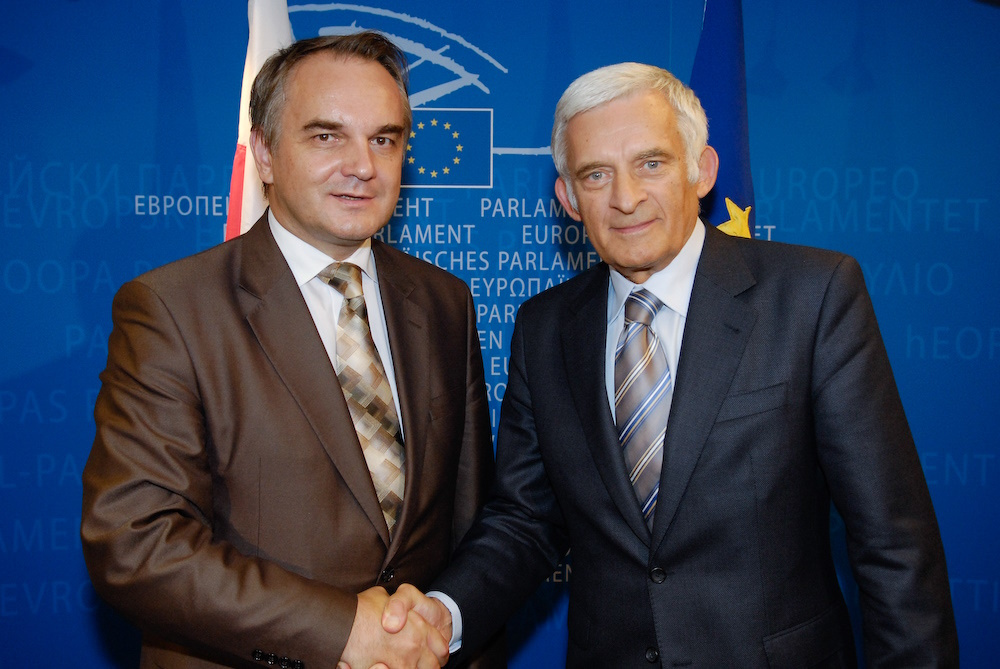

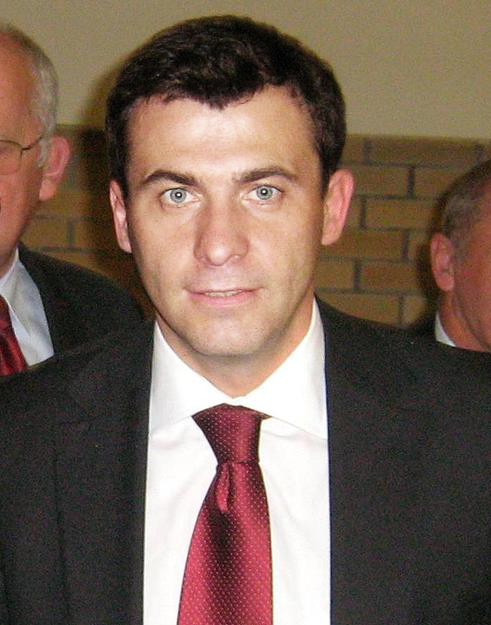

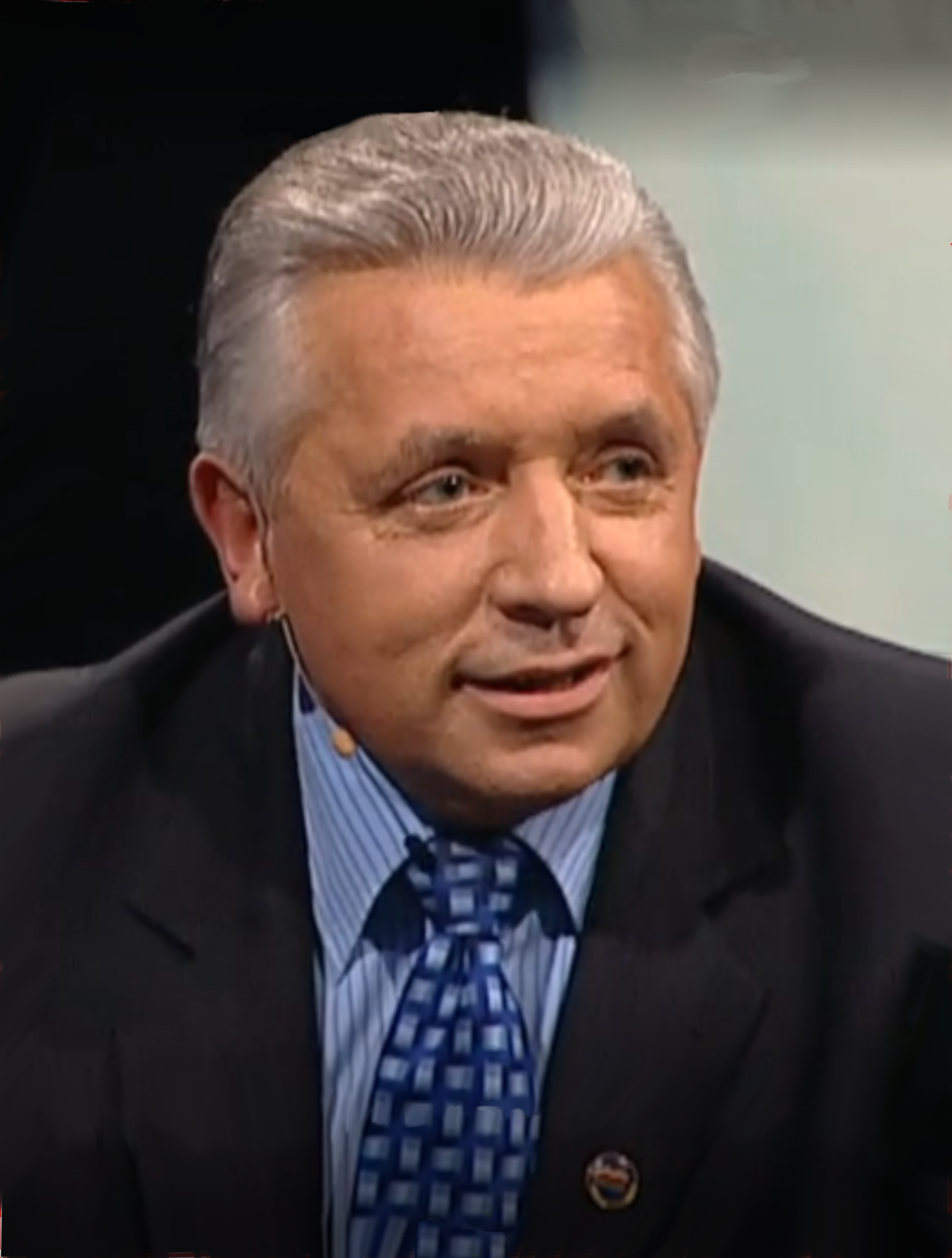

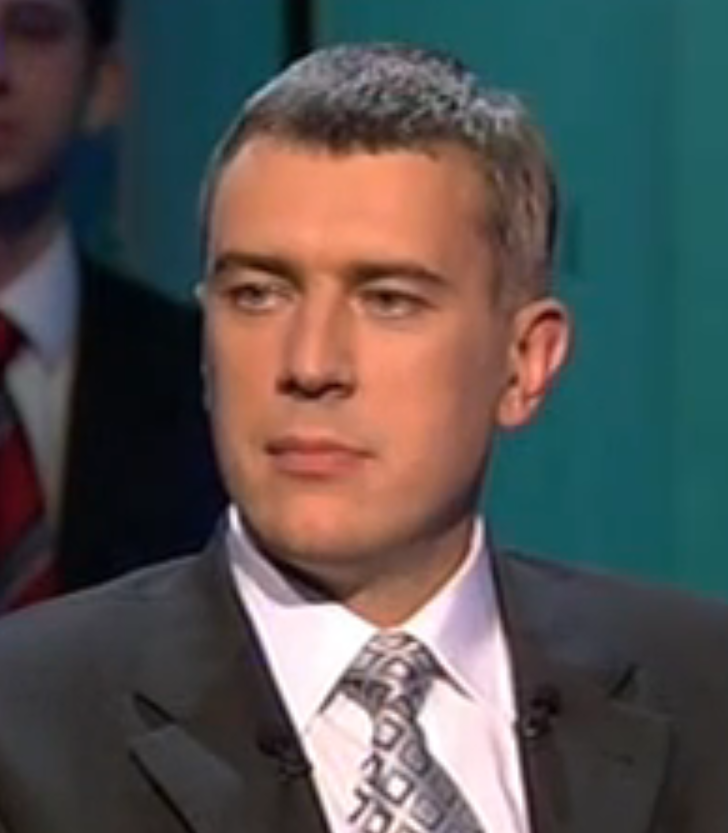
	First party	Second party	Third party
Leader	Donald Tusk	Jarosław Kaczyński	Waldemar Pawlak
Party	PO	PiS	PSL
Leader since	1 June 2003	18 January 2003	29 January 2005
Last election	13.2%, 84 seats (Note: Aggregate results of POPiS (12.1%, 79 seats) and Civic Platform running separately in the Masovian Voivodeship (1.1%, 5 seats).)	14.4%, 89 seats (Note: Aggregate results of POPiS (12.1%, 79 seats) and Law and Justice running separately in the Masovian Voivodeship (2.3%, 10 seats).)	10.8%, 58 seats
Seats won	186	170	83
Seat change	▲102	▲81	▲25
Popular vote	3,306,667	3,038,002	1,582,831
Percentage	27.4%	25.1%	13.1%
Swing	▲14.2pp	▲10.7pp	▲2.3pp
	Fourth party	Fifth party	Sixth party
Leader	Wojciech Olejniczak	Andrzej Lepper	Roman Giertych
Party	LiD	SRP	LPR
Leader since	29 May 2005	10 January 1992	11 March 2006
Last election	24.6%, 189 seats (Note: As Democratic Left Alliance – Labour Union.)	15.9%, 101 seats	14.3%, 92 seats
Seats won	66	37	11
Seat change	▼123	▼64	▼81
Popular vote	1,582,831	666,876	568,935
Percentage	14.4%	5.6%	4.7%
Swing	▼10.2pp	▼10.3pp	▼9.6pp
- Result of the voivodeship sejmik elections

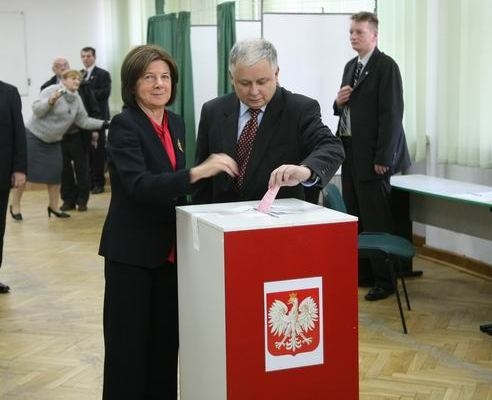
Lech and Maria Kaczyński

The 2006 Polish local elections were held in two parts. with its first round on 12 November and the second on 26 November 2006. In the election's first round, voters chose 39,944 gmina councillors, 6,284 powiat councillors and 561 deputies to provincial voivodeship sejmiks. Additionally, 2,460 city and town mayors, borough leaders and other officials were decided by direct or runoff elections in the second round. The elections were seen as a test to the government of Prime Minister Jarosław Kaczyński, whose coalition between his own Law and Justice party and its junior coalition partners, the Self-Defense of the Republic of Poland and the League of Polish Families, had undergone a severe crisis two months prior.

== Background ==
Following the appointment of Jarosław Kaczyński as Prime Minister following the resignation of Kazimierz Marcinkiewicz, the coalition between Kaczyński's own rightist Law and Justice, the agrarian Self-Defence of the Republic of Poland and the Christian right League of Polish Families parties experienced deep conflict. In September 2006, Self-Defense's leader Andrzej Lepper increasingly sparred with Kaczyński over the national budget, criticizing the prime minister's stance on rural infrastructure spending and sending extra troops to assist the War in Afghanistan. Kaczyński responded by asking for Lepper's dismissal from the government. In light of the political crisis, Kaczyński sought a new coalition partner in order to avoid early elections. One month later in October, Kaczyński and Lepper reconciled, returning Self-Defense to the coalition government and reappointing Lepper as both his deputy and as Minister for Agriculture. However, the coalition crisis dented the government's popularity in opinion polls.

In the midst of the crisis, Kaczyński aide Adam Lipinski was secretly filmed trying to coax Self-Defense Sejm MP Renata Beger to rejoin the coalition government with financial and legal assistance. Beger later handed the film to television networks. The opposition Civic Platform party seized on the scandal, organizing street demonstrations in Warsaw to demand early elections. The government countered the protests by drawing its supporters for demonstrations of its own, claiming the film demonstrated normal political bargaining.

== Results ==
In the aftermath of the local elections' first round on 12 November, Kaczyński's Law and Justice saw intermediate gains across voivodeship sejmiks and moderate results of powiat and gmina councillor seats. Law and Justice held provincial voivodeship sejmiks in Łódź, Podkarpacie, Małopolska, Lublin, and Podlaskie. In major municipalities, the party significantly lost its majority of councillor seats in Warsaw to Civic Platform, as well as suffered setbacks in Łódź, Poznań and Kraków. The party's candidate for the Warsaw mayoralty, former Prime Minister Kazimierz Marcinkiewicz, finished next to the strong showing of Civic Platform candidate Hanna Gronkiewicz-Waltz. However, in the second round of polls held two weeks later on 26 November, Gronkiewicz-Waltz defeated Marcinkiewicz. The defeat in Warsaw served as a blow to Kaczyński, whose brother Lech previously served as Warsaw's mayor until his election to the presidency in 2005.

The government's major opposition party, Civic Platform, emerged as the winner during the election, increasing its share of representation across seats in voivodeship, county and municipal administrations. In the election results, Civic Platform gained majorities in 10 voivodeships (Warmia-Masuria, Pomerania, West Pomerania, Lubuskie, Lower Silesia, Opole, Silesia, Wielkopolska, Kujawy-Pomerania, and Masovia).

The elections demonstrated a clear defeat for the Left and Democrats, the upstart coalition between the Democratic Left Alliance, Social Democracy of Poland, the Labour Union and the Democratic Party. Still suffering from the fallout of the Rywin affair and Orlengate, the Democratic Left Alliance and its leftist coalition partners lost all majorities in previously held voivodeship sejmiks and a vote decline in local races. However, the party elected candidates Jacek Majchrowski as Mayor of Krakow and Tadeusz Ferenc as Mayor of Rzeszów, though Majchrowski later suspended his party membership to become an independent.

The Polish People's Party fared well during the elections. Managing to increase its share of nearly 14 percent of all powiat councillor seats and 10 percent for all gmina seats, the party was the most elected partisan organization to receive seats in municipal councils.

Law and Justice's coalition partner, the League of Polish Families, suffered during the local elections. The government's coalition party mustered two percent of the vote in the voivodeship sejmiks, a little more than one percent in county councils, and nearly half a percentage point in gmina councils.

Independent politicians or local political activists enjoyed strong results in municipal councils and in city mayoralties.

Minor political parties that participated in the election and fielded candidates in more than one voivodeship include:

- People's Party “Patrimony” (Polish: Stronnictwo Ludowe „Ojcowizna” RP);
- Christian Local Movement (Polish: Chrześcijański Ruch Samorządowy);
- Polish Confederation – Dignity and Work;
- National Party of Retirees and Pensioners;
- National Revival of Poland;
- Polish Labour Party - August 80;
- Polish Socialist Party;
- Patriotic Self-Defence;
- Alliance of Democrats;
- Union of the Left;
- Real Politics Union;
- Self-Defence of the Polish Nation;
- Greens 2004;
- People's National Movement;
- Slavic Union.

=== Turnout ===
	12 November	26 November
voting districts	33,362	11,385
electors	29,877,983	14,643,543
ballots	13,742,032	5,812,667
turnout	45.99%	39.69%

=== Voivodship councils ===
Electoral committee	% of seats	Seats
Civic Platform (PO)	33.16%	186
Law and Justice (PiS)	30.30%	170
Polish People's Party (PSL)	14.80%	83
Left and Democrats (LiD)	11.76%	66
Self-Defense of the Republic of Poland (SRP)	6.60%	37
League of Polish Families (LPR)	1.96%	11
German Minority (MN)	1.25%	7
Regional committees	0.18%	1
Total	100.00%	561

Party	Votes	%	Seats
Civic Platform	3,306,667	27.35	186
Law and Justice	3,038,002	25.12	170
Left and Democrats	1,736,608	14.36	66
Polish People's Party	1,582,831	13.09	83
Self-Defence of the Republic of Poland	670,745	5.55	37
League of Polish Families	568,935	4.71	11
National Party of Retirees and Pensioners	358,708	2.97	0
Real Politics Union	147,153	1.22	0
Polish Labour Party	135,538	1.12	0
Patriotic Self-Defence	77,722	0.64	0
Silesian Autonomy Movement	63,070	0.52	0
German Minority Electoral Committee	49,131	0.41	7
Self-Governance Agreement W. Lubawski	42,119	0.35	1
National Revival of Poland	41,171	0.34	0
Christian Self-Governance Movement	40,306	0.33	0
Self-Governance Community of the Mazovian Voivodeship	36,873	0.30	0
Defence of the Polish Nation	21,577	0.18	0
Polish Confederation – Dignity and Work	19,153	0.16	0
Good Self-Government	17,853	0.15	0
Our Warsaw and Mazovia	16,895	0.14	0
Self-Governing Agreement of the Right	16,773	0.14	0
Our Podlasie	15,321	0.13	0
Firemens' Electoral Committee	12,610	0.10	0
Youth Together	10,131	0.08	0
Belarusian Electoral Committee	7,914	0.07	0
Independent Committee of Marian Jurczyk	7,422	0.06	0
Faithful to Poland	7,152	0.06	0
Driving Instructors' Association	5,602	0.05	0
Self-Government Platform Association	5,503	0.05	0
Now Częstochowa	5,408	0.04	0
Self-Governing Opole	4,546	0.04	0
Development and Work through the Future of Self-Governance Association	3,042	0.03	0
Voivodeship Self-Governance Movement	2,981	0.02	0
National Association of Social Activism	2,317	0.02	0
Sławomir Gąsiorowski - lawyer Electors' Electoral Committee	2,037	0.02	0
Ziemia Lubańska Doby Napoleońskiej	1,821	0.02	0
Janusz Nowakowski Electors' Electoral Committee	1,629	0.01	0
Jerzy Manduk "TIME" Electors' Electoral Committee	1,472	0.01	0
Warmia-Mazury Economic Party	1,332	0.01	0
Confederation of Independent Poland	1,227	0.01	0
Your Good Choice	1,082	0.01	0
LEFT - Young Socialists - Greens	990	0.01	0
Sowiński's List	851	0.01	0
Teresa Nawrocka "2b" Electors' Electoral Committee	598	0.00	0
"We Will Handle It"	553	0.00	0
Workers'-Peasants' Agreement	500	0.00	0
Total	12,091,871	100.00	561
Valid votes	12,091,871	87.09	
Invalid/blank votes	1,792,424	12.91	
Total votes	13,884,295	100.00	
Registered voters/turnout	30,241,176	45.91	
Source: National Electoral Commission

=== County councils ===
Electoral committee	% of seats	Seats
Local committees	42.12%	2,647
Law and Justice (PiS)	19.76%	1,242
Polish People's Party (PSL)	13.80%	867
Civic Platform (PO)	12.40%	779
Left and Democrats (LiD)	7.45%	468
Self-Defense of the Republic of Poland (SRP)	3.37%	212
League of Polish Families (LPR)	1.07%	67
National Party of Retirees and Pensioners	0.03%	2
Total	100.00%	6,284

=== Municipal councils ===
Electoral committee	% of seats	Seats
Local committees	71.92%	28,726
Polish People's Party (PSL)	9.74%	3,890
Law and Justice (PiS)	7.71%	3,079
Civic Platform (PO)	4.47%	1,784
Left and Democrats (LiD)	3.40%	1,357
Self-Defense of the Republic of Poland (SRP)	2.17%	867
League of Polish Families (LPR)	0.59%	236
National Party of Retirees and Pensioners	0.01%	5
Total	100.00%	39,944

=== Mayors ===
Electoral committee	% of mayors	Mayors
Local committees	81.87%	2,014
Polish People's Party (PSL)	10.28%	253
Law and Justice (PiS)	3.13%	77
Civic Platform (PO)	1.87%	46
Left and Democrats (LiD)	1.71%	42
Self-Defense of the Republic of Poland (SRP)	1.02%	25
League of Polish Families (LPR)	0.12%	3
Total	100.00%	2,460

== Post election controversies ==
Following the election, controversy erupted regarding a 2005 law, obliging the mayors of municipalities to publicly disclose their own, as well as their spouse's, financial circumstances. The law required the successful candidate's disclosure statement to be provided within 30 days after their inauguration, whereas the statement regarding the candidate's spouse was to be submitted within 30 days after the actual election. Due to the law, several elected officials resigned, while others refused. The highest profile figure affected newly elected Warsaw mayor of Hanna Gronkiewicz-Waltz, refused to offer her resignation. Waltz submitted her and her husband's statements on 2 January 2007, exactly 30 days after her inauguration. On 20 January the newspaper Dziennik reported that Waltz's documents proceeded past the deadline by two days. Based on this, Prime Minister Jarosław Kaczyński maintained that Gronkiewicz-Waltz's mandate had expired on 28 December 2006, calling for new municipal elections within her jurisdiction. Gronkiewicz-Waltz and Civic Platform argued that the prime minister does not carry authority to make a decision in this matter, and that the case instead be examined by a court. Legal experts maintained that by submitting their statements on the same day, Gronkiewicz-Waltz observed the spirit, if not the letter of the law. Also, having two different deadlines for the statements could be considered as an unconstitutional legal trap. In the meantime, the opposition Civic Platform party announced that it would renominate Gronkiewicz-Waltz should the elections be repeated. On 13 March 2007 the Constitutional Tribunal of Poland ruled against the government, striking down the law. However, those officials who previously resigned were not allowed to return to their posts.
