= Krzysztof Filipek =

Polish politician (born 1961)

member of Sejm 2005-2007 leader of Party of Regions (2007-)
- In office 25 September 2005 – ?

Personal details
- Born: 1961 (age 64–65)
- Party: Party of Regions

Krzysztof Filipek (born 1 August 1961 in Węgrów) is a Polish politician.

== Background and career ==
Filipek was born in Węgrów. He was elected to the Sejm on 25 September 2005, getting 16,515 votes in 18 Siedlce district as a candidate from the Self-Defence of the Republic of Poland list.

He was also a member of Sejm 2001-2005.

Filipek was a Member of European Parliament during 5th parliamentary term.

In 2007 Self-Defence lost the parliamentary election and Filipek left this party. Now he is a member and leader of the Party of Regions.

== Trivia ==
Before being elected to the Sejm, he was working as a janitor.

== See also ==
- Members of Polish Sejm 2005-2007
