= Patriotic Self-Defence =

Patriotic Self-Defence Samoobrona Patriotyczna
- Abbreviation: SP
- Leader: Marian Frądczyk
- Founded: 21 September 2006
- Registered: 10 July 2007
- Dissolved: 9 January 2013
- Split from: SRP
- Headquarters: ul. Lubelska 61, 26-920 Gniewoszów
- Membership (2006): 20
- Ideology: National agrarianism Social Catholicism; Socialist populism Anti-capitalism
- Political position: Right-wing
- Religion: Roman Catholic
- Colours: Yellow; Red; Blue
- Sejm: 0 / 460
- Senate: 0 / 100
- European Parliament: 0 / 51
- Regional assemblies: 0 / 552
- City presidents: 0 / 117
- Politics of Poland; Political parties; Elections; A: The party was regarded to be a right-wing breakaway from SRP, but it had also been described as left-wing populist.

Patriotic Self-Defence (Polish: Samoobrona Patriotyczna, SP) was a minor political party in Poland. The party was founded in September 2006 by former members of the Self-Defence of the Republic of Poland (Polish: Samoobrona Rzeczpospolitej Polskiej, SRP), who left the party following an argument with the leader of Self-Defence Andrzej Lepper. The party ran in the 2007 Polish parliamentary election, where it tried to take votes from their former party by using a similar name, logo and political program. Ultimately, the party's electoral lists were only accepted in one electoral district. The party won 0.02% of the nationwide vote. It disbanded in 2013.

The party consisted of about 20 Self-Defence members, who left the party after it consolidated itself into a far-left party. The name of the party referred to the fact that the SRP completely abandoned nationalism by 2007. The ideology of Patriotic Self-Defence became a mixture of nationalist, Catholic and social policies and tried to play into the main political values of Self-Defence such as agrarianism, populism and socialism. Because Self-Defence had a broad voter coalition including the army, ultra-nationalists, socialists and farmers, Patriotic Self-Defence wanted to win over voters dismayed by SRP affirming itself as a radically left-wing party.

== History ==
Self-Defence of the Republic of Poland was founded in 1992 as a political and social movement meant to protest Balcerowicz Plan and rural poverty. Starting as a rural trade union, it soon grew into a significant social force that represented not only farmers but also blue-collar workers, the unemployed, the pensioners and everyone impoverished or "left out" by the economic transition into free-market capitalism. Self-Defence utilized nationalist and populist rhetoric and was considered an independent party above the already existed post-communist and anti-communist divide, which allowed it to appeal to various social and political groups, including the military, socialists and even ultra-nationalist.

By the late 1990s, the party emerged as a household name and managed to extend its appeal beyond the countryside. However, beyond agrarians, socialists and post-communist social democrats, the party's support base also started including anti-communist radicals, Catholic fundamentalists and ultranationalists. At the time, the leader of the party Andrzej Lepper was mainly concerned with widening his appeal and did not reject anyone, despite amassing notable support from both the radical right and radical left circles. The party mainly advertised its anti-establishment credentials and ideological flexibility.

Lepper gained the sympathy of various nationalist and right-wing groups, such as the ultraconservative Radio Maryja or far-right millionaire Jan Kobylański. Lepper participated in various interviews held by Radio Maryja and other right-wing media, which resulted in Self-Defence attracting massive followings amongst several right-wing radicals. Amongst Lepper's followers were the Popular-National Bloc (based on the interwar-era Popular National Union), Free Trade Union "August 80" - Confederation, as well as Tadeusz Wilecki, far-right general known as the "Polish Pinochet". The party was also supported by a small paramilitarist Polish Front at the time, led by Marek Toczek and Lech Jęczmyk.

However, it was slowly becoming clear that Self-Defence was a left-wing party. As a candidate in the 1995 Polish presidential election, Lepper called for a return to socialism, arguing that it had "not yet reached full maturity". Lepper would also express his support for legalizing marijuana and allowing same-sex partnerships in the early 2000s, which was an anathema to his nationalist supporters. Ultimately, Lepper increasingly consolidated his party as a far-left one - he called for a “worker-peasant alliance” with fellow socialist parties, dismissed the right-wing and nationalist wings of the party, and established friendly relations with Jerzy Urban, the left-wing radical editor of the anticlerical weekly Nie. The party also invited several socialist politicians and activists to its electoral lists such as Leszek Miller and Piotr Ikonowicz. Self-Defence cemented itself as radically left-wing, Mirosław Karwat called the party "probably the only political party that speaks well of Communist Poland" by Mirosław Karwat, while Piotr Długosz considered the party an "heir of the communist regime".

The party managed to keep a small fraction of its former right-wing supporters by forming an anti-liberal government with (then centre-right) Law and Justice and far-right League of Polish Families (LPR). However, Self-Defence entered the government because it wanted to replace Democratic Left-Alliance as the mainstream left-wing party. By 2007, the government collapsed, and Law and Justice managed to oust both LPR and Self-Defence from the government. Both parties played with the idea of a querfront League and Self-Defence, but the idea was dropped in 2007 when ideological differences became clear. Lepper himself admitted that such an alliance was a bad idea and was only considered to be purely tactical and situational. According to Maciej Marmola, Self-Defence was considered to be on the extreme end of left-wing politics in Poland.

Patriotic Self-Defence was founded in late September 2006, and coincided with the collapse of the PiS-Samoobrona-LPR coalition government. It was formed by 20 former MPs of Samoobrona, who condemned "the adventurous politics of Andrzej Lepper". The party signed an agreement with a fellow SRP breakaway Self-Defence Social Movement (Polish: Samooobrona Ruch Społeczny), which would eventually form Self-Defence Rebirth (Polish: Samoobrona Odrodzenie) in 2007. However, both parties did not run together in the elections, and Self-Defence Rebirth declared that it will be "as left-wing as Samoobrona was", taking a different direction from Patriotic Self-Defence.

The main goal of the party was to run in the 2007 Polish parliamentary election and attract disaffected SRP voters. To this end, Patriotic Self-Defence adopted a very similar name and almost identical logo, and presented a similar program. The party tried to appeal to nationalist and right-wing voters who used to support Samoobrona before it affirmed its left-wing identity; members of Patriotic Self-Defence stated that their main ideological point was to "foster patriotism in the nation". However, the party soon ran into problems with registering its electoral committee; the national electoral commission would declare candidates' registration as invalid, which made the party unable to compete in many electoral districts. Given the issues encountered with registration of its candidates, the party was only able to formally enter the register of political parties in 2007. The party would run into further issues in other committees, as its list of candidates to the Sejm were invalidated in more districts. Patriotic Self-Defence blamed Andrzej Lepper for exerting legal pressure on the government to throw out its lists. Patriotic Self-Defence also tried to field candidates with similar or identical names to those of prominent activists of Samoobrona.

Ultimately, the party was only able to field an electoral list in a single electoral district. The party ran a largely invisible electoral campaign, and organized a protest against the arrest of Antoni Jarosz, a right-wing agrarian economist charged with corruption. The party called Jarosz a "victim of an anti-Polish provocation". Political commentators noted the sharp turn of SRP to "radical left", while Patriotic Self-Defence was assumed to appeal to the right-wing, nationalist fringes of SPR's electorate. However, Patriotic Self-Defence failed not only due to its registration failures, but also because Self-Defence supports were overwhelmingly left-wing, and were found to be more left-wing than voters of all other parties and non-voters. The majority of the party also wished for a return to communist economy. In the 2007 election, the party won 2531 votes, which amounted to 0.02% of the nationwide vote. The party managed to win a local seat - one of the members of the party, Ryszard Gerek, was able to gain a seat in the local council of Płock County. The party also fielded two candidates for the Senate:

- Leszek Michał Barwiński - in the Lublin electoral district (received 24,856 votes, coming 11th out of 14 candidates),
- Leszek Sułek (non-partisan, then MP for the People's National Movement) - in the Kielce electoral district (received 23,833 votes, taking 9th place out of 11 candidates).

In 2008, the leaders of the Patriotic Self-Defence established a party called Patriotic Poland, with Ryszard Jarznicki as chairman and Zbigniew Witaszek, Zdzisław Jankowski and Marian Frądczyk as vice-chairmen (the authorities were changed in 2018). Under the banner of this grouping, the Patriotic Self-Defence milieu, among others, took part in the 2010 Polish local elections. In the 2011 Polish parliamentary election, members of the party Joanna Szadura in constituency No. 15 (Świdnik-Kraśnik), Anna Rękas in constituency No. 19 (Zamość) and Zbigniew Witaszek in constituency No. 40 (Warsaw area) were among candidates for the Senate on behalf of the Polish Labour Party - August 80, but took the last places in their constituencies.

Patriotic Self-Defence refused to participate in the 2009 European Parliament election in Poland, registering an electoral committee but not fielding any candidates. The party said that its refusal to participate was a protest against the ‘anti-democratic lawlessness’ prevailing in Poland and Europe. The party's leader, Marian Frądczyk, stated: "If the elections were democratic, we would have run. What lawlessness is at stake? The rich parties are putting out propaganda with our money. And they are pushing us to the margins in the meantime."

The party disbanded in 2013.

== Party leadership ==
Leader:

- Marian Frądczyk

Vice-chairmen:

- Ryszard Geryk
- Ryszard Walenty Jarznicki
- Zbigniew Witaszek

== Ideology ==
Patriotic Self-Defence differentiated itself from its parent party Self-Defence of the Republic of Poland, which was plaused on the left fringe of Polish politics. Main values of the new party were nationalism and patriotism. Patriotic Self-Defence was described as a mixture of national, Catholic and social policies. The party heavily cooperated with nationalist and populist circles, and called for a nationalized economy, believing that the capital had been "taken away" from Poles and Poland. However, the party was also supported by socialist and left-wing parties and associations such as the Polish Labour Party - August 80.

The party was described as right-wing and "national-patriotic", and would later dissolve to form a new party together with former members of the far-right LPR. The party positioned itself as a right-wing populist, agrarian and nationalist party, wishing to replicate the initial success of SRP with the now abandoned nationalist and populist appeal; SRP is considered to have abandoned nationalism by 2007, and was classified as a socialist or a communist party. Piotr Długosz called Samoobrona an "heir of the communist regime" in 2008.

Despite its right-wing orientation, the party largely still campaigned on socialist ideals and entered negotiations with trade unions and minor left-wing parties. The party entered agreements with local parties such as Radom Citizens' Local Government, (Polish: Radomski Samorząd Obywatelski) and factions of the Independent Self-Governing Trade Union "Solidarity". The party also cooperated with and received the endorsement of the far-left Polish Labour Party - August 80. Similarly to original Samoobrona, Patriotic Self-Defence called for immediate halt of privatization and then renationalization of Polish industry. The party argued that the capitalist transition and free market reforms brought about "a degeneration of social and economic life in the country", with one of the members of the party warning: "If the capitalists do not stop plundering us, a serious social crisis may result". Because of its economic rhetoric, the party was also classified as social populist or left-wing populist, very similarly to the far-left SRP that Patriotic Self-Defence broke away from.

Another part of the SRP rhetoric that Patriotic Self-Defence stayed loyal to was agrarianism. The party called for an agrarian-based economy, stating that only small and medium-sized farms can ensure Polish food security; Patriotic Self-Defence argued that agriculture and farming are the economic flywheels of Poland, and believed that it was the only way to "recover from the economic collapse of the last 30 years". To this end, the party described itself as "patriotic of peasant origin". The party's platform was described as national-agrarian, and advocated for extensive increases of state benefits and support for agriculture while also condemning economic liberalism and consumerism, describing a return to agrarianism as a "moral and economic renewal" of Poland. Patriotic Self-Defence also collaborated with rural newspapers such as Zielony Sztandar (in publication since 1931), and campaigned for an economy that would address the issue of economic exclusion of Polish peasants and establish protective mechanics for small agriculture and family farms, especially those focused on ecological production.

In its populist rhetoric, the SP created the contrast and conflict of interest between "simple people" and the governing elites, with the latter lousing touch with ordinary citizens and derailing the economy by privatizing and selling off capital for their own personal benefit. The party presented an anti-capitalist and socialist program, demanding radical policies aimed at equality and redistriubtion. The party combined its populism with nationalism appeal, idealizing and romanticizing rural life and the figure of the Polish peasant as pure and only source of true Polish values. Rural Poland was described as "true, honest and traditional", but one that was vulnerable and had to be defended from capitalism and foreign interference. The populism of Patriotic Self-Defence was ultimately mainly economical, particularly focusing on protectionist, state-interventionist and socialist postulates.

On the issue of foreign policy, the party promoted a plan of improving both political and economic relations with all Polish neighbors, with a particular focus on Slavic countries. Patriotic Self-Defence also stressed the need to stabilize Polish relations with Russia, offering to pursue a moderate stance towards Russia in line with that of Hungary and Slovakia. The party also called for "an honest analysis of the real benefits" of Polish membership in the European Union, expressing doubts on whether Polish membership in the union was beneficial to Poland and did not infringe upon its economic sovereignty. The party believed that any policy that is harmful to Polish farmers should be considered a breach of the Accession Treaty. Despite its nationalist rhetoric, the party was not consistently Eurosceptic and had a mixed and inconsistent stance on the European Union. Its criticism of the EU was not focused on cultural and national issues, but rather focused on asymmetrical and exploitative economic relations of Poland with the EU.

Patriotic Self-Defence promised to immediately halt privatization and fully nationalize Polish industry. The party called for implementing social benefits that would be enough to enable the beneficients to live comfortably. Unemployment benefits were to be increased to match the social minimum, and the party also introduced a postulate to ban evictions completely; it also called for a social program that would guarantee a one-time payment of 10 minimum wages to every woman for each child born. The party also called for a more progressive tax, completely free healthcare and education up to higher education, and wanted to fully nationalize "big capital".

== See also ==
- Self-Defence of the Republic of Poland
- League of Polish Families
- Self-Defence Rebirth
- Self-Defence Social Movement
- Peasants' Party (Poland)
- Party of Regions (Poland)
- Self-Defence of the Polish Nation
