= Polish Communist Party (2002) =

Polish political party

Communist Party of Poland Komunistyczna Partia Polski
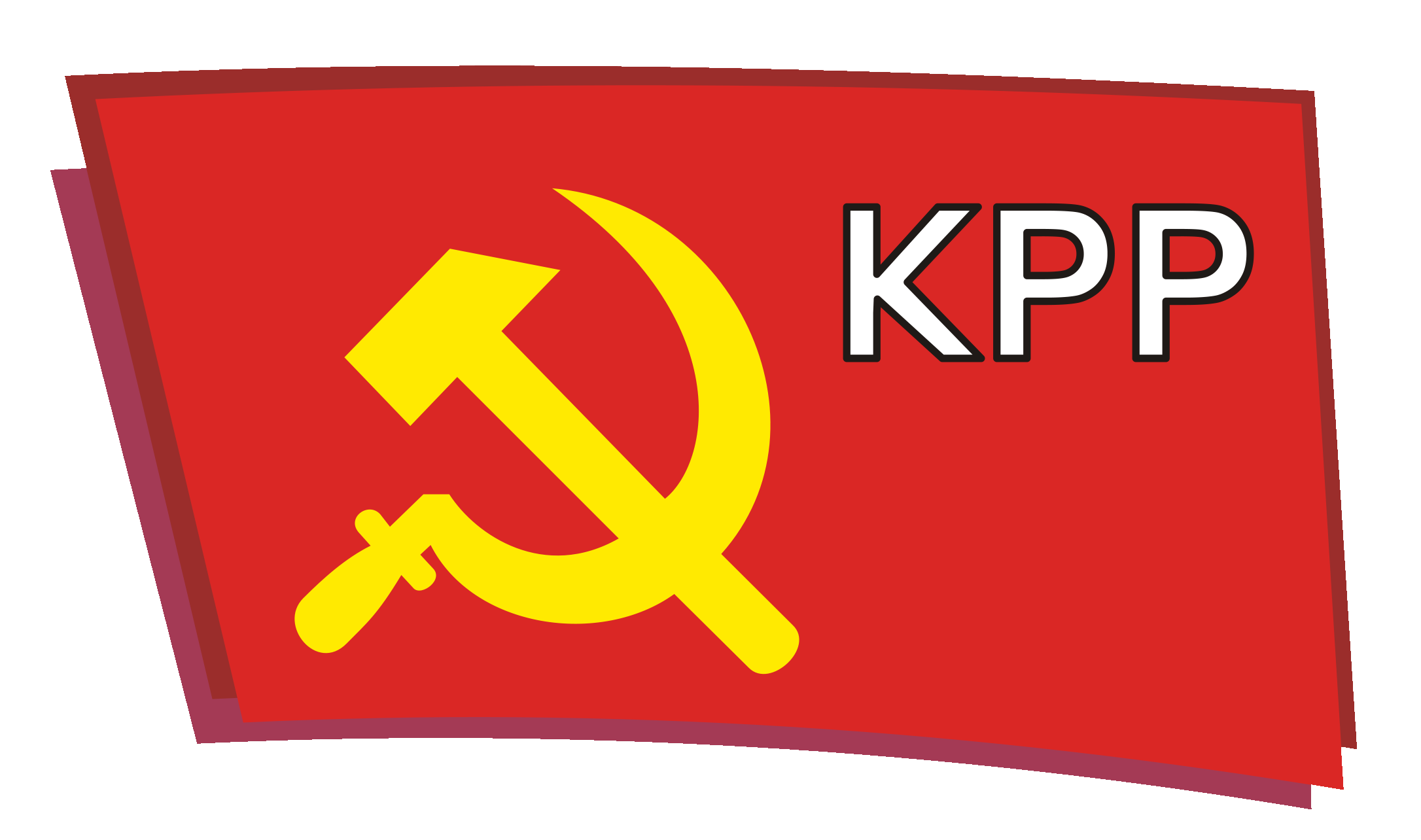
- Chairman: List: Marcin Adam (2002-2006) Józef Łachut (2006-2010) Krzysztof Szwej (2010-2023) Beata Karoń (since 2023)
- Founded: 20 July 2002
- Registered: 9 October 2002 (initial registration); 17 April 2026 (re-registered)
- Banned: 15 December 2025 (Note: The Warsaw District Court recognized the ruling of the Constitutional Tribunal from 3 December 2025 and ruled to outlaw the party on 15 December 2025, which came to effect on 30 December 2025.)
- Headquarters: ul. Trzeciego Maja, 41–300 Dąbrowa Górnicza
- Newspaper: Brzask
- Membership (2025): ~300
- Ideology: Communism; Marxism–Leninism; Left conservatism; Left-wing nationalism
- Political position: Far-left
- European affiliation: INITIATIVE (until 2023)
- International affiliation: IMCWP
- Colours: Red
- Slogan: Proletarians of the world, unite!
- Anthem: The Internationale

Website
- kom-pol.org/

The Polish Communist Party (Polish: Polska Partia Komunistyczna), or the Communist Party of Poland (Polish: Komunistyczna Partia Polski, KPP), is a Marxist-Leninist party in Poland. It was founded in 2002 by former members of the Union of Polish Communists "Proletariat" (Polish: Związek Komunistów Polskich „Proletariat”), a Marxist-Leninist party that functioned between 1990 and 2002, and was ultimately banned in 2002. In 2013, the KPP co-founded the Initiative of Communist and Workers' Parties, and cooperated with minor socialist and left-wing nationalist parties such as the Polish Labour Party, Polish Socialist Party, and the Democratic Party of the Left. The party battled constant attempts at outlawing it; on 3 December 2025, the Constitutional Tribunal declared the party's program to go against the 1997 Polish Constitution for promoting totalitarianism, and the KPP was formally banned on 30 December 2025. On 17 April 2026, the party was reinstated, as the Constitutional Ruling was deemed non-binding.

The party describes itself as "a Marxist-Leninist party that draws on the best patriotic and internationalist traditions of the Polish labor movement", and aspires to be the historical and ideological heir of the Communist Party of Poland, Polish Workers' Party and the Polish United Workers' Party. The KPP representes a conservative and nationalist tendency of communism, and upholds the legacy of the Polish People's Republic, including that of the Endo-Communist Mieczysław Moczar. It calles for restoration of Polish socialism, based on abolition of classes and private property, and socialization of the economy. It postulates Polish withdrawal from the EU and NATO, supports the Russian Federation in the Russo-Ukrainian War, and supports post-Maoist China, along with Vietnam, Laos, North Korea and Cuba as socialist states.

== History ==
=== Foundation ===
The Communist Party of Poland was founded in July 2002 in Dąbrowa Górnicza by activists largely derived from the Union of Polish Communists "Proletariat", which was founded by about 1000 members of the Initiative Group (Polish: Grupa Inicjatywna), an anti-reform socially conservative faction within the Polish United Workers' Party, in 1990. The Union of Polish Communists "Proletariat", was mainly active in Silesia, particularly in Dąbrowa Górnicza, as well as Gliwice, Knurów, Zabrze, Bytom. It opposed the Polish Round Table Agreement and called for a revolution against the Balcerowicz Plan, which it described as "a dogmatic programme of restoring capitalist relations" and "total privatisation" which resulted in "the transfer of national assets to foreign capital, without the consent of the nation", along with "the loss of economic sovereignty and the transfer of part of the national income abroad".

Since its creation, there had been numerous attempts to delegalize the Union of Polish Communists "Proletariat", which was ultimately successful in 2002. As a result, the former members of the party decided to form a new party, the Polish Communist Party. The first congress of the party took place in December 2002, the second in December 2006, the third in December 2010, the fourth in March 2015, and the fifth in July 2019.

=== 2000s electoral efforts ===
In the Polish parliamentary elections in 2005 and 2007, KPP members started from the lists of the Polish Labour Party (PPP). In the 2005 Polish presidential election, the party supported Daniel Podrzycki of the PPP (who died shortly before the election in a road accident). Before the 2010 Polish presidential election, the chairman of the party Józef Łachut expressed support for the candidacy of Grzegorz Napieralski from the Democratic Left Alliance (SLD) at the Congress of the Left Alliance, which then became the official endorsement of the party.

The party endorsed the Polish Labour Party in the 2002 Polish local elections, which as the successor of the Alternative Social Movement ran under the name of "Alternative Labour Party". In November 2005, the secretary of the Polish Socialist Party, Mateusz Ziembiński, defected to the Polish Communist Party, arguing that "only the KPP intends to consistently defend the interests of the working world and the principles of representative democracy, and to build a society free from conflict and rivalry." In the 2006 Polish local elections, the KPP fielded candidates on the electoral list of the Polish Labour Party, together with the Polish Socialist Party and the Democratic Party of the Left.

In 2006, the KPP's cooperation with the Polish Labour Party was its height, and the convention at which the new KPP leader, Józef Łachut, was elected, was attended by the leader of the Polish Labour Party Bogusław Ziętek. During the convention, Ziętek stated: "Our long-standing cooperation has convinced us of the ideological value and sincere dedication of your party's members to the struggle for the rights of workers, the poor and the marginalised. The system in which we live objectifies human beings, placing profit and capital above them. Capitalism turns people and their labour into commodities. We must oppose this by continuing our common struggle." The Polish Communist Party criticized the "alarmingly low number" of new housing built in Poland, and introduced taxation proposals, such as cutting the goods and services tax rate while increasing stock market transactions tax.

The party intervened in the 2009 European Parliament election in Poland by endorsing and speaking in support of Adam Gierek, co-founder of the Edward Gierek's Economic Revival Movement and a son of the former communist leader Edward Gierek. Adam Gierek sought to run in the election on the electoral list of Democratic Left Alliance – Labour Union in the Silesian Voivodeship; however, while Labour Union favoured Gierek to be put on the top of the list, local Democratic Left Alliance leaders wished to put him no higher than as the 3rd candidate on the list. Together with Edward Gierek's Economic Revival Movement, the Democratic Party of the Left, the Working People's Movement, and left-wing patriotic movements, the KPP spoke in favor of Gierek taking 1st place on the list. Eventually, Gierek was placed on the 2nd place, and successfully won a seat.

In the 2010 Polish local elections, the party formed an election committee (Red Wrocław Election Committee) and put forward candidates for the Wrocław city council. The committee won 135 votes in the city of Wrocław, which amounted to 0.07% of the popular vote there. In the 2011 Polish parliamentary election, an individual member of the KPP, Lech Fabiańczyk, ran for the Sejm from the SLD list in Sejm Constituency no. 40.

=== Later activity ===
In 2013, the party joined the International Meeting of Communist and Workers' Parties, and became one of the founding parties of the Initiative of Communist and Workers' Parties. Within these organisations, the party signed a declaration declaring is support for scientific socialism and opposition to the EU as a capitalist organisation.

The Communist Party of Poland called for a boycott of the 2015 Polish parliamentary election. In addition, it established contacts with the Polish Left. In the 2019 Polish parliamentary election, the KPP put forward one candidate to The Left for the Sejm, Lech Fabiańczyk. Before the 2020 Polish presidential election, the Communist Party of Poland supported the candidacy of Waldemar Witkowski from Labour Union. In the second round, the party advised to vote for the opponent of President Andrzej Duda, regardless of who it would be. The KPP subsequently detached itself from The Left political alliance.

The party declared its support for Polish farmers during the 2024 Polish farmers' protests.

On 4 November 2025, a declaration from "Comrade Damian J. Składanek and comrades from the CPP" appeared on the party's website, denouncing KPP's leader Beata Karoń for "oligarchic dictate,” “departure from the principles of Marxism-Leninism,” and a “nationalist deviation.” The declaration was taken down within hours, and the party made an official statement, stating that the post was a result of hacking and that the declaration's author, Damian J., attempted to reactivate the Polish Workers' Party (dissolved in 1946) as a rival party. The party identified Damian J. as the author of "Naukowy Socjalis" social media profile, where he labelled the KPP "Braunites, russophiles and Dmowski-loving National Bolsheviks".

=== 2025 delegalization ===
On 6 November 2025, Polish president Karol Nawrocki, appealed to the Constitutional Tribunal to delegalize the KPP, citing unconstitutionality. On 3 December, the Constitutional Tribunal ruled that the goals of the party are incompatible with the Polish Constitution which prohibits the existence of political parties that base their program on "totalitarian ideologies like Nazism, fascism and communism". Tribunal judge Krystyna Pawłowicz stated that KPP's communist ideology "goes against the fundamental human values and the traditions of European and Christian civilization". Given the ruling, the appeal to ban the party was forwarded to the National Electoral Commission.

Media speculated that the ruling may not be respected by government authorities because of the Polish constitutional crisis. After the 15 October Coalition came to power, in March 2024 it passed the law declaring that the Constitutional Tribunal functioned "in violation of the law" and that some of the Tribunal's judges were its members illegally. Since then, the Constitutional Tribunal's rulings were not published in Dziennik Ustaw.

On 5 December, the Polish Communist Party declared that it did not recognize the Constitutional Tribunal's ruling, arguing that given the Polish constitutional crisis, the Tribunal is considered illegal and thus "has no legal force". The party also claimed that the ruling failed to obey the law as the Tribunal did not consider request to adjourn the hearing, called no witnesses, did not conduct an investigation to gather evidence, did not seek any expert opinion, and ignored the requirement for the presence of the Attorney General during the ruling (the absence of Attorney General was the basis for rejecting the 2020 appeal). The KPP also declared that it would continue to function as a political movement even if it were deregistered as a political party, and that it would continue to admit new members.

On 20 December 2025, the party's website was cleared of all content and replaced with a "Statement and Second Open Letter to Left-wing Circles". The authors, Damian J. Składanek (responsible for the 4 November takeover) and Piotr Bednarek, claimed that they were motivated by a "sincere desire to save the idea", and that the website was not stolen, but was already owned by Bednarek. In the letter, they alleged that the party had "drifted toward conservatism", accusing it of supporting Grzegorz Braun and his "firefighting front". The statement claimed that the KPP contained former members of the Patriotic Union Grunwald, the main Endo-Communist organization of the Polish People's Republic, and that the party promoted the "thought of Roman Dmowski", "Russian disinformation", "ethnic hatred towards Ukrainians", "slogans of Serbian nationalists", "pre-war ONR and Moczarist currents", "rejecting class struggle in favor of chauvinism", and tolerating "open antisemitism and racism".

On 15 December 2025, the District Court of Warsaw affirmed the Constitutional Tribunal's ruling that the goals and activities of the Polish Communist Party were against the Polish Constitution, and formally banned the party. This decision sparked criticism, given that the government bodies previously refused to recognize the authority of the Constitutional Tribunal. On 30 December 2025, the ban became law and the party was struck off the register of Polish political parties. The party's website and social media accounts had also been taken over by its political opposition.

=== 2026 re-registration ===
On 17 April 2026, the party was successfully re-registered and reinstated into the official register of political parties. According to Rzeczpospolita, a note which stated that the ruling is not legally binding was added to the report on the Constitutional Tribunal banning the party. Former chairman of the KPP, Krzysztof Szwej, states that the party was most likely allowed to re-register because of its appeal, where the party argued that the ruling was non-legal given that the ruling 15 October Coalition refuses to publish the Constitutional Tribunal's rulings in Dziennik Ustaw, as it considers most of the body's members to have been illegally appointed by Law and Justice.

Szwej noted that the party's legal position might not yet be safe; in March, the Sejm elected six judges to the Constitutional Tribunal. President Nawrocki refused to swear in four of them, and the President of the Constitutional Tribunal, Bogdan Święczkowski. However, Szwej argues that should the situation in the Constitutional Tribunal be resolved, the ruling on the party's ban might then become law. The party also had battle internal problems, as the party's website had been taken over by the people hostile to the party, and was unavailable online.

On 1 June 2026, the party regained control of its website, and social media. On 20 June, the party supported the recall of Aleksander Miszalski in Kraków, criticizing his environmentalist policies such as the low-emission zone as "a scheme to rob motorists and discriminate." It also spoke against Aleksandra Owca, the candidate of Razem in the 2026 Kraków mayoral election, arguing that the program of the parliamentary left in Poland amounted to criticizing Miszalski for "not squeezing enough out of workers through this zone".

== Party program ==
The KPP proclaims anti-capitalist and anti-imperialist slogans. It seeks to introduce socialism and take over political and economic power by the proletariat. It claimed to represent the patriotic tradition of the Polish workers' movement. It calls for the replacement of capitalist property by social ownership through the nationalization of industry, trade and natural resources. They advocated broad social rights (including free and universal education and free healthcare). It postulates cessation of privatization and reprivatization and tax reform (progressive tax system, limitation of VAT), as well as property vetting. It criticizes the liquidation of the Polish People's Republic and the political transformation. The KPP is against Poland's participation in the European Union and NATO. In addition, the party strongly opposes the decommunization laws and the historical policy pursued by the Institute of National Remembrance. The party's minimal program postulates social reforms, shorter working hours, and Poland's withdrawal from the EU and NATO. The minimal program also includes the demands for halting privatization and reprivatization, laws to enforce wealth transparency and workers' right to unionize, free education and healthcare, state programs to relieve indebted farmers, and stopping the suppression of cooperatives. It rejects market economy, arguing that "market laws are the laws of the jungle", and "economic freedom does not create a free society" because "company profits take precedence over the rights to decent work and decent pay".

The party sums up its goals as abolition of social classes, socialist democracy, seizure of power by the proletariat, and socialisation of the means of production. It defines socialism as "the possibility for everyone who works to fully enjoy the fruits of their labour", provided through social ownership of the means of production and destroying the power of the propertied classes. The Polish Communist Party argues that it was futile to take over the bourgeois state apparatus through parliamentary elections. According to the KPP, parliamentary elections in Poland constitute a ‘field of manipulation’, noting the "incapacitation of the mass media", which the party saw as controlled by the bourgeoisie. At the same time, it does not declare the need for revolution, but rather "conscious interference through political means in the sphere of private enterprise ownership" and "the establishment of workers' councils in workplaces, as well as an alliance with peasants and part of the intelligentsia". According to Polish political scientist Paweł Malendowicz, the party has claimed to reject seizing power through a violent revolution in order to avoid state persecution, although in reality it does support it. The KPP proposes a model of socialist democracy based on the political system of Cuba.

The party's ideology was described as based on Marxist-Leninist thought, but "filled with the rhetoric of the past, and above all, sentimentalism towards People's Poland". The party focuses on criticizing the post-1989 developments in Poland, such as "the growing areas of poverty, the inability to meet material needs and limited access to education and cultural goods, as well as a growing sense of injustice". It rejects parliamentary democracy, arguing that it is anti-proletarian and heartless; the party wrote: "The nation should rejoice that it has been liberated from the shackles of communism, rejoice that we have expelled the Russian occupiers and give alms, and not bother the rulers with trifles. For example: how to feed their families. There is freedom, there is democracy, and everyone has freedom of action. These are the rules of democracy! And if someone cannot take advantage of freedom and democracy, that's their problem!". It sees capitalist restoration in Poland as colonialism, noting that 80% of Polish banks were sold to foreign entities.

On its website, the KPP glorified Joseph Stalin as the "Liberator of the Nations" and Kim Jong-Il as the "Great Leader", supported the leadership of North Korea, and denied Soviet agency in the Katyń massacre. The party declares People's Republic of China, Vietnam, Laos, North Korea and Cuba as socialist states; On China, the party affirms "with full conviction Chinese Marxism and the PRC as a socialist country with Chinese characteristics and Chinese features." It also supports Venezuela as a socialist-led state, describing it as a country that is in a process of moving "from classical capitalism to a pro-socialist orientation". The KPP supports Russia, explaining that the "Asian socialist countries, together with Cuba, survived among other things thanks to the ‘silent’ support of numerous formally capitalist countries, whose interests coincided in the fight against the imperial ambitions of the leading capitalist powers and attempts to subjugate the world to global capital in the context of rapidly advancing globalisation processes."

=== Position in Polish politics ===
The KPP was described as an anti-constitutional, anti-systemic, and a "classic revolutionary party". The party's stance towards the mainstream Polish left changed over time. While the KPP's predecessor, the Union of Polish Communists "Proletariat", worked together with the Democratic Left Alliance (SLD), the KPP became hostile to the SLD in the 2000s. In 2008, the KPP's leader Józef Łachut declared: "The Communist Party of Poland has no relations with the SLD; we operate within the framework of the Congress of the Left. The left-wing nature of the SLD is very superficial. After all, the leaders of this party, such as Leszek Miller and Aleksander Kwaśniewski, involved Poland in a colonial war in the name of American capital interests in Iraq and prepared our participation in the war in Afghanistan." However, the party supported the Polish Labour Party - August 80, and ran on its electoral list in the 2005 Polish parliamentary election and 2006 Polish local elections, together with the Polish Socialist Party and the Democratic Party of the Left. The KPP "fundamentally disagrees" with anarchism, although it participated in May Day marches with anarchist parties. The sole non-communist party that the KPP declared admiration for was the Self-Defence of the Republic of Poland (Samoobrona). When Samoobrona's leader, Andrzej Lepper, died in 2011, the Polish Communist Party praised him as "a prominent politician, statesman and man of purpose", and argued that he did not commit suicide, but was murdered by Polish political elites. On Samoobrona itself, the KPP wrote:

Samoobrona RP is a party that recognised and dared to publicly oppose the social injustice that has engulfed Poland. It exposed the behind-the-scenes internal and international games played by capitalism with Polish society. It bravely endured considerable pressure, which it was subjected to because of this. Samoobrona RP is needed by the country, society, workers and farmers.

The party is in active contact with communist parties in Greece, Germany, and Türkiye. The KPP and its newspaper, Brzask, are also affiliated with the party Zmiana of Mateusz Piskorski. According to Gazeta Wyborcza, both parties organize joint demonstrations and also share a parallel political program, claiming to represent ‘the interests of working people, the unemployed, young people, and pensioners.’ In 2025, the National Executive Committee of the KPP condemned the Greek Communist Party for claiming that "contemporary China and Russia are imperialist countries", stating that this claim "has not been shared by any Communist Party in socialist countries and they were criticized by the international communist and workers’ movement." The party expressed support for the World Anti-Imperialist Platform (WAP), an alliance of communist parties such as the British CPGB-ML, Russian CPRF and the American ACP.

It fully supports and upholds the legacy of the Polish People's Republic, writing in 2013: "We consider the years of the Polish United Workers' Party's existence and its exercise of real power in Poland to be the most beautiful, most successful and most fruitful period in the history of our state and our nation. [...] Unquestionable respect is due to all First Secretaries of the Central Committee: those still living, Stanisław Kania and Wojciech Jaruzelski, and those who have passed away, Bolesław Bierut, Edward Ochab, Władysław Gomułka, Edward Gierek and Mieczysław Rakowski". The party also praises and upholds the legacy of Mieczysław Moczar despite his controversial Endo-Communism and role in the 1968 Polish political crisis, writing: "It is said that he was a controversial figure. Agreed, but he was as controversial as he was principled in his adherence to the Marxist worldview and its application in everyday life – in his party and professional work, in his social and personal life. In professing his Marxist worldview and adhering to it on a daily basis, Mieczysław Moczar was principled, unambiguous and therefore worthy of deep respect." It denies the accusations of Moczar and his Endo-Communist Partisans being antisemitic, arguing that "the authors of history written to [capitalist] political order and tailored to the needs of political correctness confuse anti-Semitism with anti-Zionism".

=== Social issues ===
Amongst the radical left parties, the KPP was classified as conservative, and nationalist. It supports Polish patriotism, and opposes Poland's integration with NATO and the EU on the basis of Polish nationalism, decrying it as a threat to Polish national identity. The party is friendly towards religion, and published an article titled "Communists and Catholics - working people - united by a bond of solidarity and fraternity" in which it argued: "It is not that the Communists were and are opposed to Catholics. On the contrary..." It states that instead of being anti-theist, the Polish People's Republic was strongly religious in terms of customs, and that the Vatican had authority over the priests on religious matters. It demands a fairer agreement between the Vatican and the Polish state. According to the Polish political scientist Paweł Malendowicz, the party refrains from criticizing the Church's teachings from Marxist materialist grounds, and recognises the Church's role in Polish society while postulating its detachment from the political sphere.

The party wrote an analysis of Divini Redemptoris, the encyclical of Pope Pius XI against "atheistic communism". The party argued that "the Pope acknowledges the validity of the communists' economic slogans and demands, which means that they are right as long as they do not involve depriving the Church of its position and privileges" and that "it is difficult to criticise the communists when it is known that the people may recall Jesus' words, ‘Blessed are those who hunger and thirst for righteousness.’" It praised the encylical for condemning ‘liberal economic system’, noting that Pius XI presented "a view that is left-wing from today's perspective". At the same time, the KPP stated that the Church appeared powerless and ineffective against the evils of capitalism that it condemns, and it also criticized Pius XI for citing Marx's "opium of the people" remark, arguing that Marx only "described religion in Europe in functional terms, comparing it to the opium that the poor in China smoked to forget their hunger and poverty".

The KPP has spoken against same-sex partnerships, criticizing the political culture of Polish centre-left parties in which "the pinnacle of leftism has become the fight for the rights of sexual minorities". The party argues that centre-left parties are "full of people who are wealthy and therefore absolutely uninterested in the fate of the poorer social classes", and criticized same-sex partnership proposals as "a priority for the homosexual lobbies based on the ideology of the European Union". The party condemns "moral degeneration, which has proved to be the most terrible evil, incomparably worse than all the economic scandals raging in our country". The Polish Communist Party also argues that "who equates the vision of the left with the defence of sexual minorities, feminism, abortion and euthanasia reveals the lack of ideology [...], clearly betraying the entire left". It wrote:

Since the early 1990s, the rivalry between political parties, which have failed Polish society in the 21st century, has focused on abortion, religion in schools, crosses in the Sejm and other public places, and more recently, gender and animal rights. These petty bourgeois parties and their leaders argue about this instead of issues that are relevant for a society that has "broken free" from communist "oppression".

The party also rejects Luxemburgism and anarchism:

We cannot allow Marxism-Leninism to be pushed aside in favour of Luxembourgism, which is patiently, like a drop of water wearing away a rock, being smuggled into Poland, as well as in favour of various anarchist and Trotskyist groups. At present, Luxemburg and Trotsky are the most recognisable icons of the global left, while Lenin, Dzerzhinsky and Stalin are being consigned to the dustbin of history. Attempts are also being made to rewrite Marx, cutting him off not only from Lenin but also from Engels. The so-called ‘Althusser school’ is becoming an increasingly popular Marxist philosophical school.

In 2025, the party has reiterated its position on feminism and the LGBT movement:

Our position on LGBT and other issues such as quotas and feminatives has remained unchanged for many years. These topics have dominated the activities of organisations and many parties in the West, in our opinion diverting public attention from the real causes of social problems and tensions. [...] Everyone should have the right to their own views, including those who do not like people of a different orientation. Currently, even those who express their views on these topics very cautiously are immediately classified as backward, and their words are labelled with the overused term ‘hate speech’.

The party was accused of participating in "red-brown" alliances by the anarchist libcom.org platform, especially given the activities of its former youth wing, the Communist Youth of Poland (Polish: Komunistyczna Młodzież Polski), which participated in a march led by the Polish Falanga. It participated in the creation of the Zmiana party of Mateusz Piskorski in 2015 along with figures like Bartosz Bekier, the leader of Falanga. A member of the Communist Youth of Poland, Dawid Kenert, became the founder of Zmiana's trade union, Free Trade Union ‘Zmiana’ - Unity of Labour (Polish: Wolny Związek Zawodowy „Zmiana” – Jedność Pracownicza). Kenert gave an interview to a National-Bolshevik media as the representative of the Communist Youth, where he stated: "It is impossible to mix Islam with Marxism which is a materialistic ideology but I think that mixing Shariah law with some elements of planned economy would be a great system for the whole world civilisation, especially for the Middle East". Polish socialist Damian J. Składanek, who attempted to take over the party in 2025, claimed that the Polish Communist Party is "Braunite, russophilic and Dmowski-loving National Bolshevik".

=== Foreign policy ===
It denounces the NATO bombing of Yugoslavia, stating: "We must remember the victims of NATO aggression since 1999, the ongoing persecution of political and military leaders who were sent to the legally unfounded Hague Tribunal for defending their country – President Miloševic and others who died there." In 2005, the party signed a joint statement of communist parties, which declared: "Slobodan Milosevic is prosecuted by the Hague tribunal because he defended his country and his people, because he did not betray Yugoslavia, because he did not submit to the US aggressive globalism." The party opposes the independence of Kosovo, and considers its secession an imperialist action done in order to achieve the "destruction of the territorial integrity" of Serbia and to allow the USA to exert military control over the Balkans through the establishment of Camp Bondsteel in Kosovo. The party is also against NATO expansion, demanding "the dismantling of all American and NATO military bases and the dissolution of NATO" as well as removal of NATO and US missile defence shields from Europe. It also opposes the European Union, writing:

The EU is a creation of the ruling classes and Western European monopoly capital. It promotes neoliberal methods of capital concentration that benefit monopolies. The EU cannot become a European counterweight to the US. With the Treaty on Reforms and its new structures, it is gradually becoming an imperialist economic, political and military bloc. New measures are being taken in the EU against the interests of workers and entire nations. The sovereignty and independence of nations and states are increasingly being undermined.

On the Poland's accession to the EU in 2004, the party wrote that Poland had lost its economic and financial sovereignty and had also become politically dependent on the EU, becoming a "vassal of the imperialist globalisation". The KPP declared that joining the EU meant surrendering Polish sovereignty and economic independence to "large monopolies and banks"; it also condemned European integration as the "main instrument" of German imperialism, of which Poland and other Central European countries would be the target of. Ever since, Polish Communist Party has been advocating for Polexit, arguing that Polish membership in the EU means "the culmination of Poland’s complete political and economic disempowerment", and that "an independent economic, customs and fiscal policy will be of far greater benefit to Poland than dubious EU subsidies".

The party considers the Russian invasion of Ukraine to be a "de facto defensive war" of Russia against NATO. According to the party, Russia is defending itself against the "imperialist NATO campaign" and the "pro-fascist forces, financed by the United States, NATO and the European Union". The party summarized the war as such: "The main reason for the current war in Ukraine is the desire of the forces that have been in power in Ukraine since 2014 (i.e. those who prepared the coup and overthrew Ukraine's legitimately popularly elected President Yanukovich) to join NATO, the immediate consequence of which would be a threat to Russia's international security", and warned that "the collapse of Russia through the assumption of its potential defeat in Ukraine, will be a prelude to a final showdown with China, which US imperialism sees as the main and strategic threat and bulwark to its world domination." The KPP condemned "propaganda about Russian “aggression” against Ukraine", and argued that "NATO is trying to encircle Russia, contrary to the US promises made in 1990 not to move its forces eastwards".

The KPP supports multipolarity, arguing that a multipolar world "offers a more optimistic outlook for world peace and the struggle for socialism and social progress." Writing on Russia, KPP stated that its ruling class is the national bourgeoisie, and argues that it seeks to prevent the encroachement of Western imperialism and to reform the USSR in new form. The party sees Russia as a peripheral state:

The US and Western imperialism are keen to further weaken and fragment Russia. Under President V. Putin, the ruling force is the national bourgeoisie, which is determined to prevent this from happening and is even seeking to rebuild the former USSR in new form, namely the Commonwealth of Independent States and the Eurasian Union. […] Russia has lost the position held by the former USSR; its non-military industry is technologically backward, and the main source of wealth accumulation is its vast reserves of oil, gas and other natural resources, which save the country from collapse but, at the same time, systematically transform it into a raw materials base and a periphery of highly developed nations.

It denounced the Euromaidan protests as a "fascist coup", arguing that it represents only "the small and medium bourgeoisie, not from all of Ukraine, but mainly from the west and centre of the country and the city of Kiev" and noting "the lack of support among workers" as "evidenced by the failed attempt to organise a nationwide general strike". It described the post-2014 Ukrainian governments as an "alliance of neoliberals and neofascists", and argued that Euromaidan "was aimed to move imperialist zone of influence eastwards and create new markets for western monopolies." In contrast, the party supports the Donetsk People's Republic and considers it to be of proletarian character, writing:

The Donetsk People's Republic (DPR) has not explicitly defined itself as a socialist state, but provisions to that effect are included in its declaration. The economic system of the DPR is to be based on ‘collective forms of ownership’. Poor and poorly dressed people – workers and youth from the suburbs – gathered with red flags, Russian tricolours and St. George's ribbons. They took their first steps towards the collective defence of their interests. They responded to blows with blows, aggression with aggression, evil with evil. Because that is what class struggle is all about. For the first time in the history of the former Soviet Union, the working class is beginning to act. The short text of the Donetsk People's Republic's declaration contains words about collective ownership, equality and the social interest.

Commenting on the Syrian civil war, the party condemned anti-Assad opposition as "jihadists" and "reactionary gangs", arguing that its rebellion against Assad amounted to an "imperialist occupation led by the USA". The KPP declared its support for the Communist Party of Belarus and Belarusian president Alexander Lukashenko. The party condemned the 2020–2021 Belarusian protests, declaring that it views the protests "as inspired from abroad and, in essence, as imperialist aggression against the sovereign Republic of Belarus", adding that their aim is "to subjugate another country to Western imperialism and subject it to neo-colonial exploitation". It argued that Belarusian people must reject the riots and stand behind the Belarusian government to preserve "the social and economic achievements of the USSR". Along with the Communist Party of Belarus, the KPP endorsed constitutional reforms announced by Lukashenko, which included constitutional guarantees for the dominant role of the state and social ownership in the economy, and a ban on privatization.

The party supports the People's Republic of China, and considers it a socialist country. It praised the reforms of Deng Xiaoping, arguing that Deng brought prosperity and rapid development while remaining on a socialist paths, and praised him for suppressing the 1989 Tiananmen Square protests, which the KPP denounced as a counterrevolution and an attempt to abolish socialism in China. The party states that Socialism with Chinese characteristics was an adaption of Marxist theory to the Chinese national conditions, and constituted a "historical and dialectical approach that was highlighted by Marx and Lenin when exploring the question of the transition to socialism of the peoples of Asia". It wrote:

The private sector's share of the Chinese economy has exceeded half of GDP and continues to grow slowly, with the regrettable socio-economic ills typical of capitalist countries clearly visible, and life in large cities at first glance resembling similar landscapes in the traditional capitalist world. And yet, according to all studies and observations, the Communist Party's power in China remains very strong, key sectors of the economy and finance are in the hands of the state, major companies are mixed ownership, and strong state intervention in socio-economic mechanisms is a decisive factor. There is no doubt that the Communist Party's power is exercised consistently in the interests of the vast majority of citizens. The alleged harshness (and even cruelty) of the Chinese communists is undermined by insightful public opinion polls (conducted by Western institutes that are not sympathetic to them), which clearly show that the modern Chinese people consider themselves to be among the happiest in the world. These and other circumstances make it difficult for China to ‘undo’ its status as a socialist country.

The reason for allowing such far-reaching political changes in China was the desire to revive the economy, even at a huge cost. This allowed for the gradual introduction of a kind of socialist market economy, which in turn enabled the country to better adapt to the mechanisms of the global economy. Previously, links with the powerful economic (and especially financial) machine of the capitalist world had, in a sense, finished off the European countries of real socialism. The Chinese, however, have so far managed to successfully exploit these links to maintain an extremely high rate of production growth and comprehensive civilisational development.

The party also supported the Venezuelan government of Nicolas Maduro, stating that it "condemns the actions of the imperialists and speaks out in defence of the Bolivarian Revolution." It expressed "full solidarity with the people of Bolivia, President Evo Morales, the Communist Party of Bolivia, the MAS-IRSP movement and all progressive and anti-imperialist forces and movements in their great battle to defend progressive achievements and in the struggle to deepen change." It also supported Palestinian independence.

== Chairman ==
- 14 December 2002 to 8 December 2006 – Marcin Adam
- 8 December 2006 to 11 December 2010 – Józef Łachut
- 11 December 2010 to 28 October 2023 – Krzysztof Szwej
- since 28 October 2023 - Beata Karoń

== Structure and activists ==
The number of activists of the Communist Party of Poland over the years ranged from several hundred to over a thousand activists. In 2025, the party had around 300 members, although the party stated that only "several dozen" people were active in the party.

The KPP's highest executive body is the National Executive Committee. The central control body of the party is the National Statutory and Audit Commission. The body appointed to deal with individual cases of party members arising from appeals against resolutions of organs, including resolutions on exclusion from it, is the National Peer Court.

The party has minimal income - throughout 2024, its income totalled 6553.63 PLN, which was about 150% of 4300 PLN (minimum wage in Poland in 2024). It received no state subsidies, 220 PLN from donations, 2963.63 PLN from membership fees, and 3370 PLN from own activities - mainly sales of its newspaper Brzask. Polish newspaper Goniec found that the party is sustained by only about 25 people nationwide. The party also received no grants from the Election Fund, despite 2024 being an election year, indicating that the party ran no political campaigns. Goniec argued that the KPP "is more of a journalistic entity than a real political party."

== Newspaper ==
The official newspaper of the party is Brzask, published in subscription and available on the Internet. Its stated goal is "protecting the achievements of People's Republic of Poland and undertaking various initiatives to save Marxist philosophy in the face of anti-communist fury". Brzask has been published since 1991, and initially functioned as the newspaper of Union of Polish Communists "Proletariat" (Polish: Związek Komunistów Polskich „Proletariat”). The Union of Polish Communists "Proletariat" was founded in 1990 and functioned until its ban in 2002. In 2002, its former members created the Polish Communist Party, and continued the publication of Brzask. The Polish Communist Party praised Brzask as "a phenomenon in the history of the Polish press", stating that it was edited communally with over 160 authors in total by 2022.

== Outlawing procedures ==
Ever since the creation of the Polish Communist Party, there have been attempts to outlaw it, often in the form of lawsuits and legal requests made by Polish MPs and ministers. The KPP argued that they "have been persecuted since the dawn of their history for promoting communist ideas in capitalist Poland." The existence of communist parties in Poland and their activities were legal until 2023 as long as they refer to the ideology of the communist system, bypassing totalitarian methods and practices. Similarly, communist symbolism were not prohibited in Poland. The Polish Communist Party completely dissociated itself from the use of totalitarian methods.

In 2009, the government of Civic Platform and Polish People's Party planned to ban communist symbols and books. Elżbieta Radziszewska, the government's "Plenipotentiary for Equality", announced the plans to expand the Polish Penal Code by adding new offences such as "promotion of fascism or other totalitarian systems" and "production of materials associated with totalitarianism". The hammer and sickle and the swastika were to be banned as totalitarian symbols, along with Lenin's works. The Polish Communist Party condemned these plans, and the party's leader Józef Łachut defending public display of both hammer and sickle as well the swastika, arguing that th former "originated during the struggle of Israeli peasants against the Romans", and speaking of the latter: "It is a symbol of happiness for the people. Hindus and Muslims have used it since time immemorial. It was Hitler who borrowed this symbol for propaganda purposes. But he could not appropriate it, because the swastika means something other than Nazism". The party also questioned the logic of banning Lenin's writings, noting that they are studied in Western universities.

In 2013, Law and Justice activist Bartosz Kownacki requested the party to be banned because of alleged propagation of totalitarianism. The prosecutor's office investigated and discontinued the investigation after finding no evidence of a crime. From 2015 to 2019, a trial was underway regarding the alleged promotion of the totalitarian system by KPP activists in the magazine Brzask. On January 18, 2019, the District Court in Dąbrowa Górnicza found editors of the magazine Brzask innocent of the alleged offenses. Although ultimately unsuccessful, Kownacki's legal efforts to outlaw the party resulted in the KPP removing calls for a communist revolution from its program.

As part of solidarity with the KPP in connection with the court proceedings against it, in 2018 and 2019 protests under Polish embassies organized, among others The Communist Party of Greece, the Communist Party of Belgium and the Communist Party of Britain. In Poland, solidarity with the KPP was declared by the Democratic Left Alliance and Workers' Democracy.

In 2020, the Public Prosecutor General and Minister of Justice Zbigniew Ziobro requested the Constitutional Tribunal to ban the party, alleging that it had a totalitarian ideology and wanted to seize power violently.

Another attempt to ban the party was made by the President Karol Nawrocki on 6 November 2025, who signed an application to the Constitutional Tribunal to delegalize the KPP. On 3 December 2025, the Constitutional Tribunal ruled that the party's communist ideology goes against the Polish constitution and "the fundamental human values and the traditions of European and Christian civilization".

The ruling itself did not delegalize the party, as the delegalization has to be carried out by the National Electoral Commission, although the institution's decision is uncertain given the Polish constitutional crisis. Media speculated that the ruling may not be respected by government authorities, as after the 15 October Coalition came to power, in March 2024 it passed the law declaring that the Constitutional Tribunal functions "in violation of the law" and that some of the Tribunal's judges are its members illegally. Since then, the Constitutional Tribunal's rulings are not published in Dziennik Ustaw.

On 5 December, the Polish Communist Party declared that it did not recognize the Constitutional Tribunal's ruling, arguing that given the Polish constitutional crisis, the Tribunal is considered illegal and thus "has no legal force". The party also claimed that the ruling failed to obey the law as the Tribunal did not consider request to adjourn the hearing, called no witnesses, did not conduct an investigation to gather evidence, did not seek any expert opinion, and ignored the requirement for the presence of the Attorney General during the ruling (the absence of Attorney General was the basis for rejecting the 2020 appeal). The KPP also declared that it will continue to function as a political movement even if it is deregistered as a political party.

On 15 December 2025, the District Court of Warsaw affirmed the Constitutional Tribunal's ruling that the goals and activities of the Polish Communist Party were against the Polish Constitution, and formally banned the party. This decision sparked criticism, given that the government bodies previously refused to recognize the authority of the Constitutional Tribunal. On 30 December 2025, the party was struck off the register of Polish political parties.

On 17 April 2026, the party was reinstated into the official register of the Polish political parties. A note was added to the report on the Constitutional Tribunal's ruling on the party, which stated that the ruling was not binding legally. The former leader of the party, Krzysztof Szwej, stated that the most probable reason for the party's reinstatement was the fact that the Constitutional Ruling was not published by the government in Dziennik Ustaw as the result of the ruling's coalition conflict with the judges.

== Electoral results ==
=== Presidential ===
Election year	1st round			2nd round		
Election year	Candidate	# of overall votes	% of overall vote	Candidate	# of overall votes	% of overall vote
2005	Supported Daniel Podrzycki					
2010	Supported Grzegorz Napieralski	2,299,870	13.68 (#3)			
2020	Supported Waldemar Witkowski	27,290	0.14 (#10)			

=== Sejm ===
Election year	# of votes	% of vote	# of overall seats won	+/–
2005	91,266	0.77	0 / 460	Steady
2005	On behalf of the Polish Labour Party.			
2007	160,476	0.99	0 / 460	Steady
2007	On behalf of the Polish Labour Party.			
2011	518	0.24	0 / 460	Steady
2011	A party member, Lech Fabiańczyk, ran on the list of the Democratic Left Alliance.			
2019	819	0.3	0 / 460	Steady
2019	A party member, Lech Fabiańczyk, ran on the list of The Left.			

=== Senate ===
Election year	# of votes	% of vote	# of overall seats won	+/–
2005	11,765	0.05	0 / 100	Steady
2005	On behalf of the Polish Labour Party.			

=== Regional assemblies ===
Election year	# of votes	% of vote	# of overall seats won	+/–
2002	Endorsed the Alternative Labour Party.			
2006	135,538	1.12	0 / 552	Steady
2006	On behalf of the Polish Labour Party.			
2010	135	0.07	0 / 552	Steady
2010	As the Red Wrocław Electoral Committee.			

=== European Parliament ===
Election	Votes	%	Seats	+/–	EP Group
2009	Endorsed Adam Gierek (Democratic Left Alliance – Labour Union)				

== See also ==
- Communism in Poland
- Nostalgia for the Polish People's Republic

== Notes ==
✝: Daniel Podrzycki died in a car accident shortly before the election.
W: Margin in the city of Wrocław only.
a: Margin in the Sejm Constituency no. 40 only.
b: Margin in the Sejm Constituency no. 40 only.
