= Democratic Party of the Left (Poland) =

Polish political party

Democratic Party of the Left Demokratyczna Partia Lewicy
- Abbreviation: DPL
- Leader: Elżbieta Wasiak (2002–2008); Ryszard Treliński (2008–2009); Marek Patas (2009–2013)
- Founder: Arkadiusz Ciach; Zbigniew Litke
- Founded: 7 December 2002
- Registered: 23 January 2003
- Dissolved: 16 September 2013
- Split from: Democratic Left Alliance
- Headquarters: Rembielińska 17/10, 03-352 Warsaw
- Membership (2003): ~8,000
- Ideology: Social democracy Anti-capitalism
- Political position: Left-wing
- National affiliation: SRP; KPEiR
- Colors: Red; White; Blue

Website
- dpl.org.pl
- Politics of Poland; Political parties; Elections; New logo of the party, adopted in 2005.

The Democratic Party of the Left (Polish: Demokratyczna Partia Lewicy, DPL) was a left-wing political party in Poland. The party was founded on 7 December 2002 and formally registered on 23 January 2003. It was founded by former activists of the Democratic Left Alliance (SLD). DPL sought to create a "real left-wing" alternative to SLD, dismissing SLD as a corrupt and neoliberal party funded by Western capital. The party sought to create a broad coalition of minor left-wing parties, and participated in numerous Polish elections between 2003 and 2007, forging alliances and agreements with multiple similar parties, but never managed to receive a seat. It participated in social actions, protests and declarations, decrying neoliberalism, capitalism, and Western interventions in the Middle East. The party remained active until 2010, and was dissolved in 2013.

DPL considered itself "the real left wing" in Poland. The party positioned itself as a direct opponent of economic liberalism and social conservatism; at the same time it was supportive of the Polish membership in the European Union. It considered the Democratic Left Alliance a "centre-right party", and formed one of many parties that split off from SLD between 2001 and 2005. While initially rigorously internationalist and opposed to populism, DPL shifted towards left-wing populism and anti-capitalist by 2005, and started cooperating with nationalist and anti-EU parties. That year, the party became a close ally of the far-left Self-Defence of the Republic of Poland, and joined its electoral list in the 2005 election. It remained closely integrated with Self-Defence afterwards, and stayed active by participating in left-wing coalitions and offering endorsements.

== History ==
The Democratic Party of the Left was formed on 7 December 2002 in Kutno by representatives of a number of left-wing local committees, which were formed before the 2002 Polish local elections as a result of conflicts in the Democratic Left Alliance.

On 23 January 2003, DPL was registered. The party was soon joined by a number of left-wing activists that were disillusioned with the Democratic Left Alliance and minor centre-left parties aligned with it. In the same year it became involved in the 2003 Polish European Union membership referendum, supporting Poland's accession to the EU.

The party postulated the creation of a broad left-wing coalition, and initiated talks with parties such as the Centre Left of the Republic of Poland (Polish: Centrolewica Rzeczypospolitej Polskiej), Reason Party as well as New Left (old party of Piotr Ikonowicz existing between 2003 and 2011). However, shortly after registration, Polish authorities opened an investigation into the party and threatened delegalization on the charge that the signatures party collected by the party were fraudulent.

In the 2004 European Parliament election in Poland, the party registered a list in the district covering Lubuskie and Zachodniopomorskie voivodeships, receiving 5 513 votes (0.09%) nationally and ranking 18th out of 21 electoral committees. Among others, a member of the Reason Party ran on the DPL list at the time.

By 2005, the party shifted in its stances and ideology. It embraced more radical social and anti-capitalist slogans, and started cooperating with nationalists and anti-EU parties, such as the far-left Polish Labour Party - August 80 and Christian socialist Self-Defence of the Republic of Poland. It continued, however, to base its identity on opposing the "caviar left" of Democratic Left Alliance. Together with the National Party of Retirees and Pensioners, the DPL started closely cooperated and signed an agreement with Self-Defence of the Republic of Poland.

In the 2005 Polish parliamentary election, party members ran unsuccessfully for the Sejm: Bożena Witkowska from the Self-Defence of the Republic of Poland list and Jarosław Bąk from the National Civic Coalition (Polish: Ogólnopolska Koalicja Obywatelska, OKO) list. Some of the party members also ran from the list of Polish Labour Party - August 80, together with the Polish Socialist Party and the Polish Communist Party. After the 2005 election, DPL remained a close ally of Samoobrona together with the National Party of Retirees and Pensioners.

In July 2006, the party condemned Polish MEP Maciej Giertych, the father of Roman Giertych, for paying tribute to Francisco Franco. The party called this action an "attack on the European left" and argued that it justifies the European Parliament's resolution to include Poland amongst countries classified as threatened by racism, xenophobia and fascism. This was done despite the fact that Giertych belonged to the League of Polish Families, a party that Samoobrona was in ruling coalition at the time.

For the 2006 Polish local elections, the party initially sought to found the Federation of the Polish Left (Polish: Federacja Polskiej Lewicy) together with the National Party of Retirees and Pensioners and other minor left-wing parties. DPL argued that it wishes to create a "true left" in Poland, while accusing the Democratic Left Alliance and the Social Democracy of Poland of being left-wing in name only. However, on 13 September 2006, the Democratic Party of the Left signed an electoral agreement with the Democratic Left Alliance, under which it became a member of the local government coalition Left and Democrats. DPL candidates in the 2006 Polish local elections ran on the lists of this coalition.

In the 2007 Polish parliamentary election, 4 DPL candidates (then-chairwoman Elżbieta Wasiak, Wojciech Grabałowski, Janusz Kotusz and Leszek Szarama) ran unsuccessfully for the Left and Democrats lists.

Later, many DPL activists switched to the Polish Left - a party founded by Leszek Miller after he left the SLD and cooperating with Self-Defence of the Republic of Poland.

In the 2009 European Parliament election in Poland the party supported the candidacy of Adam Gierek of the Labour Union, successfully running for re-election from the list of the Democratic Left Alliance – Labour Union coalition committee.

In the 2010 Polish presidential election, the party initially supported the candidacy of Jerzy Szmajdziński of the Democratic Left Alliance. While noting their dislike of Szmajdziński's party, DPL also argued that Szmajdziński would be a "guarantee of peace in Polish politics" and that he would put an end to the "pointless war between Law and Justice and Civic Platform". However, Szmajdziński perished in the Smolensk air disaster. In the wake of this, DPL expressed support in the early elections for Bronisław Komorowski instead - the Civic Platform candidate.

In the 2011 Polish parliamentary election DPL did not participate. The party did not submit a financial report for 2012 and was deleted from the evidence of political parties on 16 September 2013.

== Leadership ==
Until 10 February 2008, the chairperson of the party was Elżbieta Wasiak. After her resignation and membership of the party, Ryszard Treliński became the head of the party (he took over on 9 March and was elected to the position by the congress on 24 May), who died on 9 May 2009. On 26 June of the same year, Marek Patas was elected as the new chairman of the DPL, who held the position until the end of the party's existence.

== Ideology ==
The party was described as left-wing, and social democratic. It was to the left of the main social democratic party in Poland in the 1990s and 2000s, the Democratic Left Alliance. It DPL was founded at the time when Democratic Left Alliance was in disarray - in regions like Silesia, nearly all of the party's local structures defected to new left-wing parties, accusing their former party of centralizing and neoliberalizing tendencies. DPL presented itself as an "alternative for common people" and accused Democratic Left Alliance (SLD) of abandoning left-wing ideals; DPL emphasized that unlike SLD, it is "a party without money brought from the West". DPL described Democratic Left Alliance as a "centre-right party", and stated: "Today's SLD has little in common with leftist thought. The only fully left-wing party is Samoobrona, but they are populists after all. This is why we have decided to set up a new party."

DPL sought to create what it called "a real left wing in Poland", and rejected the mainstream left-wing parties in Poland at the time, the Democratic Left Alliance and the Social Democracy of Poland, as parties that bear the name of left wing but "have shown that they have nothing to do with the left". The party's slogan was "enough of economic liberalism, social conservatism and the interests of the richest!" The party attacked Polish ruling parties of taking from the poor and aiding the rich, and disregard for ordinary people. The DPL argued that economic liberalism goes against the Polish Constitution, which claims to guarantee equality and social justice. The main priority of the priority was raising the minimum wage in Poland; accordingly, the party opposed the so-called "chimney law", which was to limit the salaries of managers and executies while also freezing the minimum wage - the DPL argued that the law must raise the minimum wage instead.

The DPL supported Poland's membership in the European Union, arguing that it could protect the Polish workers from "distortions" such as "exorbitant salaries of executives and managers". The party believed that social exclusion and widening disparty between the rich and the poor are the main issues plaguing the Polish society that need to be addressed.

In 2005, the party shifted towards more populist views and embraced nationalist and anti-EU parties such as the Polish Labour Party - August 80 the Self-Defence of the Republic of Poland. DPL continued to base its ideology on opposing the "caviar left" that it perceived Democratic Left Alliance as, but also adopted radically social and anti-capitalist views. As part of its political shift, the party signed a declaration organized by far-left parties that condemned Polish media for trying to portray the neoliberal Balcerowicz Plan as a success, and for negative portrayal of the Polish People's Republic. The party also became a close ally of Samoobrona.

The party sought to unite left-wing parties in Poland on a federal basis for parliamentary elections. It strongly protested the 2011 military intervention in Libya and opposed the participation of Polish troops in it. It also appealed for support and solidarity with the mining unions in Silesia, supporting and encouraging general strikes. The party also opposed the construction of nuclear power plants in Poland and spoke in favour of creating an integrated energy system in the European Union instead. The party also opposed the presence and participation of Polish troops in the Invasion of Iraq.

It also opposed laws that commercialized the Polish health service, stating that they serve to have the Polish state avoid responsibility for life and health of Polish citizens, and that the commercialization would result in hospitals prioritizing profit over the wellbeing of patients. The party proposed to create a network of state hospitals to guarantee universal and free healthcare instead.

== Bibliography ==
- Paszkiewicz, Krystyna (2004). Partie i koalicje polityczne III Rzeczypospolitej (in Polish). Wrocław: Wydawnictwo Uniwersytetu Wrocławskiego. pp. 24–26. ISBN 83-229-2493-3.
