= Edward Gierek's Economic Revival Movement =

Edward Gierek's Economic Revival Movement Ruch Odrodzenia Gospodarczego im. Edwarda Gierka
- Abbreviation: ROG
- Founder: Paweł Bożyk; Adam Gierek
- Founded: 17 December 2004
- Registered: 14 March 2005
- Headquarters: ul. Hoża 62 lok. 68, 00-682 Warszawa
- Ideology: Communism; Socialism; Anti-capitalism; Anti-Atlanticism
- Political position: Far-left
- National affiliation: Democratic Left Alliance
- Colours: Red; Blue; White
- Slogan: "Housing and work" Polish: Mieszkanie i praca
- Sejm: 0 / 460
- Senate: 0 / 100
- European Parliament: 0 / 51
- Regional assemblies: 0 / 552
- City presidents: 0 / 117

Website
- rogeg.nazwa.pl

Edward Gierek's Economic Revival Movement (Polish: Ruch Odrodzenia Gospodarczego im. Edwarda Gierka, ROG) is a Polish far-left party with a communist programme, referring to the ideology and legacy of Edward Gierek, the First Secretary of the Polish United Workers' Party in the 1970s and 1980s. It was founded on 17 December 2004 and registered in March 2005 by Paweł Bożyk, who was one of Gierek's economic advisors. The largest regional structures of the party are located in Zagłębie and Warsaw. ROG advocates Poland's active participation in the European Union while having friendly relations with the East, and the cessation of activities within NATO. It called for the withdrawal of troops from Iraq.

The party wants to uphold and continue the legacy of Edward Gierek, considering his variation of reformist communism to be the perfect economic system, avoiding the perceived pitfalls of earlier Communist Poland which was seen as overly bureaucratized, as well as the post-1991 capitalist system, which resulted in wealth inequality and is considered to have plunged the most vulnerable parts of society into poverty and economic instability. The party fiercely combats the view that Gierek heavily indebted Polish state, and stressed the need to restore the Gierek-era expansive welfare state. The party also wants to restore communist monuments and national symbols.

== History ==
Edward Gierek was the leader of Poland from 1970 to 1980, and is the most popular communist-era leader of Poland; according to a 2018 poll, 45% of Poles positively assessed Gierek's rule, while only 22% judged it negatively. This meant that Gierek's popularity is comparable to that of Wincenty Witos, the interwar Polish statesman. Gierek is also more popular than Leszek Balcerowicz, who was responsible for transitioning Polish economy from a communist system to liberal capitalism.

Gierek's rule is considered to be the most liberal and reformist period in the history of Communist Poland, and most Poles remember it as the period of economic stability as well as relative liberalization. Under his rule, Poland took heavy loans and started extensive investment programs in housing and infrastructure - Gierek built Central Railway Line, connecting major cities such as Warsaw and Kraków together through high-speed rails. Central Railway Line remains the fastest and most modern railtrack in Poland. For years, the only high-speed route in Poland was the Trasa Katowicka, commonly referred to as "Gierkówka" in his honor. Gierek also started developing Polish energy independence, opening Naftoport in Gdańsk in 1975, which became a natural alternative to Soviet oil supplies; together with the porty, Gierek also established the oil refinery and a pipeline from Gdańsk to Płock. At the same time, the construction of the Bełchatów mine and the power plant of the same name was undertaken, with Poland's largest lignite-fired power plant built near Łódź, which generates around 20 per cent of Poland's electricity. Other major investment projects of Gierek included the Broad Gauge Metallurgical Line, the Tychy and Bielsko-Biała Small Scale Car Factories (today key to the Fiat concern) and the giant Katowice Steelworks.

However, what political commentators deemed most memorable in regards to "Gierkist Communism" were heavy housing investments, which solved housing shortages in Communist Poland and caused a demographic boom. Nearly 20% of Poles were still living in flats and houses built under Gierek as of 2023, and the number of housing units built during 10 years of Gierek's rule surpassed that built in post-communist Poland between 1991 and 2008. Under Gierek, real wages rose by as much as 50%, the collectivisation of the countryside was stopped, and the regime started new welfare programs for Polish farmers. While the Communist Party maintained its strong grip on power under Gierek, political repression was toned down, and Gierek initiated a policy of reconciliation with the Catholic Church. Gierek is remembered well even amongst some right-wing politicians - in 2010, Jarosław Kaczyński described Gierek as a "communist but nevertheless a patriot".

Karol Wojtyła, the Archbishop of Kraków who later became Pope John Paul II, praised Gierek as a wise leader, stating that Gierek would have received the help of the Polish episcopate, had he ever needed it. Wojtyła also argued that Gierek should be remembered as the communist leader of Poland "who started to pursue a reasonable policy towards the Church". Archbishop of Wrocław Bolesław Kominek expressed a similar view, stating that Gierek "spoke very reasonably" and that he was much more connected to the people than previous authorities of the Polish People's Republic. In the 1970s, Kominek described Gierek as follows: "He is surrounded by the people and the workers. He is more practical than Gomułka, he is more educated, he knows foreign languages, he spent years in France and Belgium; he has a broader horizon of thought; he was able to establish relations with the Church in Silesia."

The party was founded in 2004, and its main goal was to materialize the popularity of Gierek and nostalgia for economic stability under his reformist rule into a potent political movement. Among the group's founders, in addition to Paweł Bożyk (once head of Edward Gierek's team of advisors), were Edward Gierek's son and MEP, Professor Adam Gierek. Adam Gierek belonged to the Labour Union and was a senator of the Democratic Left Alliance bloc. The party also included Jerzy Pieniążek of Left Together, who had previously left the SLD. Edward Gierek's Economic Revival Movement ran in the 2005 Polish parliamentary election as a part of the Democratic Left Alliance's coalition; however, the party failed to win any seats in the Sejm.

In the 2005 Polish presidential election, the party initially supported Włodzimierz Cimoszewicz of Democratic Left Alliance, but Cimoszewicz ultimately resigned. Following his resignation, the party endorsed Andrzej Lepper for president, the leader of far-left Self-Defence of the Republic of Poland; despite the agrarian socialist and Catholic socialist alignment of Self-Defence, the party considered Communist Poland superior to the post-1991 capitalist regime, which led Edward Gierek's Economic Revival Movement to support it.

In the 2010 Polish presidential election, the party supported the candidate of Democratic Left Alliance Grzegorz Napieralski. In the 2011 Polish parliamentary election, party leader Paweł Bożyk ran for the Sejm from the list of Democratic Left Alliance in Katowice, but he did not win enough votes to gain a parliamentary seat.

In 2013, the party co-organised a series of conferences dedicated to Edward Gierek, to mark the centenary of his birth. In the 2015 Polish parliamentary election, ROG supported the United Left coalition, and the party's then vice-president Eugeniusz Wypijewski ran for the Senate on its behalf in the Włocławek district., coming 3rd out of 6 candidates and receiving 13.57% of the vote.

As a result of failing to submit financial statements for 2015, the party was struck off the register in January 2017, but the party continued to operate. Prior to the 2018 Polish local elections, ROG co-founded the SLD Left Together coalition. In the 2019 European Parliament election in Poland, ROG activist Bożena Szubinska ran as a candidate from the Wiosna electoral list. In addition, the party supported Bogusław Blicharski of Social Justice Movement, running from the list of the Left Together coalition.

In the 2019 Polish parliamentary election, ROG supported SLD candidates - again Bożena Szubińska (already belonging to Wiosna) and SLD activist Piotr Gadzinowski. In the 2020 Polish presidential election, the party supported the chairman of UP Waldemar Witkowski. In 2021, the ROG-affiliated milieu joined the formation of the party Polski Ruch Lewicowy. On 12 October of the same year, ROG leader Paweł Bożyk died.

== Ideology ==
Edward Gierek's Economic Revival Movement was described as a left-wing and far-left political party. It is based on the ideology and administration of Edward Gierek - the party desires a return to the reformist variant of communist system characteristic of Gierek's administration, praising it as the time of stability and prosperity. The party stresses that it does not refer to the international tradition of the communist movement, but wants to strictly focus on the legacy of People's Republic of Poland under Gierek.

In 2005, the party formally endorsed Andrzej Lepper of Samoobrona for president, praising his party for "pro-social" positions and stating that the programs of both ROG and Samoobrona mostly overlap. Samoobrona is a Catholic socialist and agrarian socialist party - Lepper called for a return to socialism during his campaign, arguing that it had "not yet reached full maturity". Samoobrona was also described as a mixture of "social Catholicism and Polish socialism". Beforehand, Social Democracy of Poland asked ROG for its endorsement, but the party refused and criticized Social Democracy for being too liberal.

ROG describes itself as an alternative to "disappointing reality" of capitalist Poland, which plunged many social groups into poverty and caused enormous wealth inequality. The party believes that the post-communist governments wasted away the achievements and legacy of Communist Poland, rendering the effort that Poles put into developing and participating in it useless, leaving "a black hole in the biography". The party calls for the return of Gierek's communism, describing it as a return to social security, prosperity and guaranteed jobs, as well as the end of the ever-growing difference between the poorest and wealthiest Poles. The party declared that it is ready to work with any party that shares their values, namely "social action geared towards helping poor people".

The party is heavily opposed to decommunization and lustration policies, condemning them as harmful and unnecessary while emphasizing the need to "bring the 1970s fully into the post-war Polish heritage". The party believes that the communist era is unfairly condemned as a result of struggle for political power amongst post-communist parties. As such, ROG believes that Gierek and his communist legacy are presented in "a tendentious, overly critical manner". The party admits that Gierek's economical management was not perfect, but that it is a superior alternative to capitalism, arguing that return to communism means "accelerating economic development and improving living conditions through job creation"; the party also believes that return to Gierek's communism is necessary because it was a system focused on human development, whereas capitalism focuses on development and completely ignores human condition.

ROG is particularly known for disputing the argument that despite the enormous growth and investment, Gierek's rule also heavily indebted Poland - leader of the party Paweł Bożyk, who was an economic advisor to Edward Gierek, wrote that the debt of Gierek's administration in 1980 amounted to 23 billion dollars - in comparison under Wojciech Jaruzelski, who in 1989 decided to cede power, left Poland in debt at 42.3 billion dollars. The party also heavily opposes privatization and condemned the capitalist transition achieved by Balcerowicz Plan; in 2013, Bożyk stated: "By the end of the 1970s, Gierek's credit stood at $20 billion. 575 factories were built. After 1990, they were sold for a sum of around 100 billion, which was simply paid into the budget. We wasted them away."

Despite its communist and anti-Atlanticist orientation, the party praised the pragmatic foreign policy of Gierek, who allowed for limited cooperation and trade with the West while staying loyal to the Soviet Union and Warsaw Pact. The party argued that while Poland should disengage from NATO and stand against American interventions such as the Iraq War, active participation in the European Union would be desirable. ROG believes that as long as the EU pursues anti-globalization and protectionist policies that would protect European workers from "the ruthless actions of global world market mechanisms", friendly relations with the Union should be maintained.

The party strongly condemns the supposed "cult" of cursed soldiers, describing it as harmful and arguing that it promotes a false narrative that serves right-wing politicians as well as anti-communism. The leader of the party wrote that honoring cursed soldiers serves the narrative of portraying Communist Poland as unpatriotic and a mere puppet of the Soviet Union, writing: "I am fortunate that I was educated in a communist school and the communist teachers taught me patriotism." The party is particularly defensive of its ideological patron Gierek, stating that he pursued a policy of achieving greater autonomy from the USSR, both politically and economically.

While ROG is nostalgic towards Communist Poland and proposes returning to the economic policy of 1970s Poland, the party is not anti-clerical and praised the Catholic Church, stating: "The Polish Church has a wisdom whose overriding goal is peace and realism." The party also praised Stefan Wyszyński for his conciliatory attitude towards Communist Poland and its values.

== See also ==
- Edward Gierek
- Social Justice Movement
- Polish Communist Party (2002)
- Polish Socialist Party
- Self-Defence of the Republic of Poland
- Polish Left
- Labour Union (Poland)
