= Social Movement of the Republic of Poland =

Social Movement of the Republic of Poland Ruch Społeczny Rzeczypospolitej Polskiej
- Abbreviation: RS RP
- Leader: Sławomir Izdebski; Piotr Ikonowicz
- Founded: 26 April 2015
- Registered: 23 July 2015
- Preceded by: Self-Defence of the Republic of Poland
- Headquarters: ul. Kopernika 36/40, pok. 319 00-924 Warsaw
- Ideology: Agrarian socialism Left-wing populism Trade union movement
- Political position: Left-wing
- National affiliation: Social Justice Movement; Self-Defence Rebirth
- Colours: Red; White; Green

Website
- www.ruchspolecznyrp.pl (archived)

Social Movement of the Republic of Poland (Polish: Ruch Społeczny Rzeczypospolitej Polskiej, RS RP) is a Polish political party founded by the agricultural and farmer trade union All-Poland Alliance of Trade Unions of Farmers and Agricultural Organisations (Polish: Ogólnopolskie Porozumienie Związków Zawodowych Rolników i Organizacji Rolniczych, OPZZ RiOR), which became known for farmer blockades and protests in winter 2015. It was headed by the leader of OPZZ RiOR Stanisław Izdebski, as well as a known socialist activist Piotr Ikonowicz. The party initially supported Paweł Kukiz, endorsing him in the 2015 Polish presidential election; it then formed and held its first party convention on 26 April 2015. The party was registered on 23 July, and distanced itself from Kukiz. It unsuccessfully attempted to organize a broad left-wing coalition for the 2015 Polish parliamentary election with minor socialist and left-wing parties. After the coalition talks failed, Social Movement ultimately ran independently in the election, but it only managed to gather enough signatures to register its electoral lists in three electoral districts. It won 3941 votes (0.03%) in the 2015 election. After the election, the party's activities were continued by the Social Justice Movement led by Ikonowicz.

Social Movement was directly inspired and aspired to become a political successor of the far-left party Self-Defence of the Republic of Poland, which was a party that both Social Movement leaders belonged to in the 2000s. It made a pledge to avenge and become a worthy successor to the leader of Self-Defence, Andrzej Lepper. The party was a grassroots movement that united trade union activists, particularly farmers and miners, disability rights activists, as well as disadvantaged social groups such as the unemployed, debtors and evicted tenants. It pledged to have 50% of its electoral lists filled by young people. The main goal of Social Movement was to "fight for the rights of various social groups harmed by neoliberal capitalism". The program of the party was socialist and called for abolition of capitalism, instead proposing an economic system based on worker cooperatives. Its political demands included reversing the privatization of the Polish industry, breaking up large farms and strong restrictions on foreign capital and foreign corporations. It proposed to greatly increase the minimum wage, investigate and abolish unfair wage disparities in workplaces, implement a turnover tax for companies with foreign capital, and use the foreign exchange reserve funds to expand the healthcare system.

== History ==
=== Origins ===
The Social Movement of the Republic of Poland founded on the basis of the rural trade union OPZZ RiOR, which organised agricultural protests in Warsaw in February 2015. The founders and leaders of the party were Sławomir Izdebski and Piotr Ikonowicz, both previously affiliated with the far-left populist party Self-Defence of the Republic of Poland (Polish: Samoobrona Rzeczypospolitej Polskiej). Izdebski was a prominent trade union activist in Samoobrona, leading a faction within the party known as Self-Defence Social Movement which organized social justice actions such as blocking evictions and organizing local agricultural trade unions in Mazowsze. In February 2006, Self-Defence Social Movement broke away from Samoobrona and became a separate party. It dissolved to join Self-Defence Rebirth in 2007, a larger from Samoobrona in which Izdebski continued his trade union activities. In early 2010s, Izdebski became famous as a coordinator of agricultural trade unions and organizer of farmer blockades that Samoobrona was once known for. Since 2011, Izdebski was seeking to recreate Samoobrona as a left-wing populist party by uniting former activists and party splits.

Piotr Ikonowicz was a co-founder and a prominent member of the post-1989 Polish Socialist Party who was supportive of Samoobrona and ran on the party's electoral lists in the 2007 Polish parliamentary election. Ikonowicz praised Samoobrona as a socialist movement that truly represents the weak and the poor; as Samoobrona's parliamentary candidate in 2007, he said: "In Poland, it has been accepted that leftists are people who are called that. But to be a leftist, you have to be there where the injustice is happening, and you have to be against the wrong-doers. Together with my Samoobrona colleagues, we are blocking evictions again, and we are creating this social welfare or social self-help movement, which was once started by socialists in the 19th century, and which the Samoobrona people are gloriously continuing today, in the 21st century." He described Samoobrona as well as his own views as alter-globalist and representing "the current of European socialism, 21st century socialism" which "does not believe in the future of humanity as it relates to capitalism". Ikonowicz reacted to Izdebski's attempt to reforge Samoobrona positively, remarking of Lepper:

The fate of Andrzej Lepper is meant to be a warning to all those who would like to try to fight the unjust system that leaves 30% of Polish children without enough food. We are supposed to be afraid to raise our hand against the privileges of the rich and powerful if we do not want to end up like Lepper. Apparently suicide is a mortal sin for Catholics. I don't know. I don't know anything about theology. But if there is a good God in heaven, he will welcome Andrzej Lepper with open arms!

=== Foundation ===
In the 2015 Polish presidential election, the Social Movement initially supported Paweł Kukiz noting his 'anti-system' appeal. The Social Movement of the Republic of Poland was then formed on 26 April 2015. The initial declaration of the party called for single-mandate electoral districts, reversal and persecution for the post-1989 privatization, universal access to healthcare, reducing the retirement age to 60–65 years, reconstruction of Eastern Polish industry, and the renegotiation of the accession treaty with the European Union. The party also decried 'the sale of Polish land', stressing the need for nationalization. Immediately after foundation, Social Movement started cooperating with miner trade unions and the socialist trade union August 80', as well as with the Silesian-Dąbrowa "Solidarity" union. The party described itself as "national, pro-Polish, socialist and pro-social".

On 14 June 2015, the party held its first founding convention. At the convention, Izdebski declared: "We want to bring together all those who are disadvantaged today, those who would like to see change on the Polish political scene - so that they can contribute to building something that has not yet been seen on the Polish political scene. However, we pay a lot of attention to young people, we want about 50 per cent of the seats on our electoral lists to be for young people." Social Movement also unveiled more of its proposal at the convention, such as the introduction of turnover tax and tax on profits transferred abroad. It also attacked Polish mainstream parties for privatizing national assets, neglecting agriculture and mining industry, and making the health service unavailable to the poor. The convention was not attended by Paweł Kukiz, which made the party distance itself from Kukiz, despite previously endorsing him for presidency. The last time Social Movement spoke well of Kukiz was on 15 June.

=== Break with Kukiz ===
The party did not get involved in the formation of the Kukiz'15 movement, which became a right-wing populist formation. Social Movement was officially registered on 23 July, and announced its campaign for the 2015 Polish parliamentary election the next day. On 26 July, Social Movement officially withdrew its support for Kukiz. Sławomir Izdebski condemned Kukiz after he revealed his right-wing views, claiming that Kukiz treats the farmers and former Samoobrona activists with contempt, and preferred to align with right-wing movements instead. Izdebski emphasized that the Social Movement will go a different way politically, stating: "The Social Movement, which we are creating, is made up of agricultural trade unions, people from the left, like Piotr Ikonowicz."

=== Attempts at left-wing coalition ===
On 11 July, the Social Justice Movement party, led by Piotr Ikonowicz, a co-founder of the Social Movement, joined the RS RP. The Movement also held talks on a joint electoral alliance with fellow left-wing and socialist-leaning parties, such as the Social Democracy of Poland, the democratic socialist Freedom and Equality, the socialist Polish Labour Party - August 80, the Polish Left, and lastly with the Party of Regions, which was a party that split from Samoobrona in late 2007. The goal of the Social Movement was to build a broad left-wing coalition, which Izdebski described as "intellectual-worker-peasant" in character, bridging both the populist and establishment left.

However, none of the talks succeeded in the end—the Social Democracy of Poland and Freedom of Equality endorsed the left-leaning faction of the centre-right, main opposition party Civic Platform, the Polish Left supported the social-democratic Left Together, and the Polish Labour Party - August 80 instead decided to become a part of the United Left alliance. Ultimately, the Social Movement reached an agreement with a minor social-democratic Whites and Reds (Polish: Biało-Czerwoni) party, which failed to register a nationwide committee, as it managed to collect 96,000 signatures, short of the required 120,000 ones. Two of the party's activists agreed to run on behalf of the Social Movement in the Siedlce district. Additionally, a single member of the Freedom of Equality party ran on the party's electoral list in the Warsaw district.

=== 2015 election ===
On 9 August 2015, the party presented its electoral lists, which aimed at the "representation of anti-system and excluded people". They included left-wing community activists, organisers of agricultural blockades, disabled people and trade unionists. The party also invited former Samoobrona members to its electoral lists, including Renata Berger, Henryk Dzido and Danuta Hojarska. Prominent activists that the Social Movement advertised on its lists was the deputy chairman of a socialist trade union August '80 Szczepan Kasiński, as well as the leader of the Supreme Council of Nurses and Midwives Polish: Naczelna Rada Pielęgniarek i Położnych Grażyna Rogala-Pawelczyk. Sławomir Izdebski revealed that the Social Movement's advisor will be image specialist of Samoobrona Piotr Tymochowicz.

Ultimately, Social Movement of the Republic of Poland registered lists for the Sejm in only three electoral districts (Lublin, Siedlce and Warsaw) as well as two candidates for the Senate (Sławomir Izdebski in the Mazowieckie Voivodeship and Artur Konarski in the Świętokrzyskie Voivodeship). Ikonowicz led the party's list in the Warsaw district. Izdbeski admitted failure, stating that Social Movement managed to gather enough signatures only in these three districts, which made the party's success impossible. The electoral committee of the party received 3941 votes (0.03%) in the election. Candidates for the Senate came last in their districts (winning a few percent of the vote each).

=== Aftermath ===
Right after the election, Social Movement admitted failure of building its platform, and invited its members to join the Social Justice Movement instead, led by Ikonowicz. Social Justice Movement was based on a similar program, organizing trade unions and representing the interests of low-paid workers. The party stated that there is only "caviar left" in Poland and offered to build a movement which would support the masses and not "hang on to the handle of capital". Just like the Social Movement, the Social Justice Movement became a socialist party. The other RS RP leader, Sławomir Izdebski, returned to the Self-Defence Rebirth. He continued his trade union activism here, and the party promotes a program very similar to the one of original Self-Defence and Social Movement, describing themselves as "true leftists by belief, Catholics by profession and with Andrzej Lepper as the role model".

The party did not participate in elections after 2015. In 2016, the party participated in a conference of left-wing parties organized by the Rosa Luxemburg Foundation in Berlin, where Piotr Ikonowicz acted as a representative of the RS RP. The party continues to be led by Izdebski, who also became the leader of OPZZ RiOR.

== Election results ==
=== Presidential ===
Election year	Candidate	1st round		2nd round	
Election year	Candidate	# of overall votes	% of overall vote	# of overall votes	% of overall vote
2015	Supported Paweł Kukiz	3,099,079	20.8 (#3)	No endorsement	

=== Sejm ===
Election year	# of votes	% of vote	# of overall seats won	+/–	Government
2015	3,941	0.03 (#16)	0 / 460	New entry	Extra-parliamentary

=== Senate ===
Election year	# of votes	% of vote	# of overall seats won	+/–	Government
2015	14,316	0.1 (#15)	0 / 100	New entry	Extra-parliamentary

== Ideology ==
The Social Movement was described as a grassroots initiative of trade unionists, primarily the agricultural ones and miners. Its main goal was to "fight for the rights of various social groups harmed by neoliberal capitalism." It represented trade unions, unemployed, striking farmers, disabled, and tenant movements. It described itself as a fusion of "initiatives of working people in villages and cities, disadvantaged by the current system". The party was critical of capitalism and the economic transformation from a planned socialist economy to a free-market capitalist one, and wished to help those who had "lost out" on implementation of capitalism. It spoke for extensive economic interventionism, strong restrictions on the presence of foreign capital and the European Union in the Polish economy, ban on foreign land ownership, abolition of "junk contracts" (predatory and exploitative job contracts), egalitarian retirement pensions system and reversal of privatization of Polish industry and forests. A key postulate of the party was land reform that would divide big farms, which the Social Movement described as "big environmental bomb" that serve "foreign interests groups". The party was also critical of capitalism and free markets, stating: "The capitalist market economy is a utopia because it favours those who have access to cheap money."

=== Economic proposals ===
The RS RP was an anti-capitalist and socialist party, promising to rebuild "true worker cooperatives: in housing, in commerce, in banking and in other areas". The party decried "theving privatization" and selling off national assets. It argued that capitalism is an unjust system, and that "Poland has been ruled by bankers and developers for 25 years, and the PO government is a government of speculators and usurers". Social Movement called for the abolition of capitalism on the basis of being a system of 'foreign handouts', where "first the factories were taken away from the workers and then their housing was taken." The leadership of Social Movement wrote: "If the left is to return to some relevance and govern itself, it cannot be a prisoner of the concept of ‘correcting capitalism’. Capitalism understood as the rule of capital over man, of the rich over the poor must be discarded and a systemic project formulated that solves the fundamental problem of a surplus of goods and services that cannot be sold because people have no money and a surplus of people for whom there is no employment. Such an offer must be socialist, because under the capitalist logic of private profit maximisation these problems are unsolvable." The party considered capitalism a system where "profits are privatized and losses nationalised", and called for an alternative, socialist system.

Other proposals of the party included a turnover tax for companies with foreign capital, elimination of "salary chimneys" (unfair and untransparant salary hierchies in companies), and allocation of 10% of Poland's foreign exchange reserve to healthcare. The party also spoke for a large increase of Polish minimum wage, arguing that "the Polish work must pay". Social Movement paid particular attention to the mining industry, stating: "We also want a real revolution in mining. There will be no such burdens, no such disparities, no CEOs who have such an eldorado - only equality. So that a miner can earn enough to educate his children and support his family." Another proposal of the party included a reform in the Polish electoral law that would reduce the financial advantage of the largest political parties, and give smaller parties a fairer chance to enter the Sejm. The RS RP also appealed to all social groups that are affected by predatory loans and credit, comparing their situation to that of mining and agricultural workers - Izdebski stated: "They have a similar problem to farmers, as they too have been pushed into a debt trap. And just like miners, railwaymen or teachers, they are a tasty morsel for the political parties."

=== Foreign policy ===
Social Movement was heavily opposed to NATO, and Ikonowicz stated that there are "the biggest terrorists in the world" behind NATO. The party argued that the Polish government commits too much money to armaments, neglecting social investments needed in areas like housing and healthcare. The party argued that the fight for social justice and the fight for peace and abandonment of militiarism are connected and complementary. It decried militarism and NATO as an "integral part of the new capitalist, global and corporate world order". The RS RP linked Poland's participation in NATO to the dominance of US capitalism and called NATO "the iron fist of those who rob us of our paycheck". Izdeski stated that instead of accepting the dominance of the European Union and Western European countries in Polish economy, Poland should seek economic and political ties with the Russian Federation and the People's Republic of China instead. The party was also opposed to the policies of the European Union, and included the proposal to renegotiate the conditions of Polish membership in the EU.

=== Political origins ===
The Social Movement of the Republic of Poland presented itself as an "authentic left-wing party", criticizing the United Left and the parties within it such as the Democratic Left Alliance. Social Movement argued that Polish parliamentary left-wing parties win seats and yet there is nobody to speak for the "unemployed, people employed on so-called junk contracts, debtors or evicted tenants". The party presented itself as one that could bring ordinary working class into the Sejm. The party also represented the rights of the disabled, including numerous disability rights activists on its electoral list. Social Movement noted that while the Civic Platform announced programs to create jobs for the disabled, its neoliberal policies also took away the means needed for the disabled to function independently. The party also pledged to restore the subsidy for the purchase of electric wheelchairs and Braille rulers.

The Social Movement of the Republic of Poland was directly based on, and wished to recreate success of, the Self-Defence of the Republic of Poland (Samoobrona). The party considered itself an anti-systemic force and promoted the interests of the disadvantaged social groups, particularly farmers, miners, and the disabled, many of which were present on the party's electoral lists. The party claimed direct inspiration from Andrzej Lepper and his Samoobrona movement that Izdebski belonged to until 2006. Lepper's Samoobrona party likewise presented itself as a party of the disadvantaged, with Lepper stating: "We are a radical party, open to all disadvantaged people who are starving at home." Samoobrona was openly socialist and far-left, but entered a coalition with populist, economically left-wing Law and Justice in 2006. The coalition broke down in 2007 when Law and Justice organized a sting operation against Lepper, and the party collapsed in snap elections. Samoobrona became a moribund party since then, and Lepper died in August 2011, in what some ruled a suicide and others a murder. Izdebski himself argued that Lepper was murdered. Social Movement swore an oath to Lepper during the campaign, to ensure that they "will punish the guilty and bring punishment to his grave."

== See also ==
- League of Polish Families
- Party of Regions (Poland)
- Patriotic Self-Defence
- Self-Defence of the Polish Nation
- Self-Defence of the Republic of Poland
- Self-Defence Rebirth
- Self-Defence Social Movement
- Social Justice Movement
