= The Poor of Poland =

The Poor of Poland Polish: Biedota Polska
- Abbreviation: BP
- Leader: Ewa Majkowska
- Registered: 31 May 2001
- Dissolved: 12 August 2002
- Succeeded by: Polish Labour Party - August 80
- Headquarters: Zgierz
- Membership (2001): 15
- Ideology: Anti-austerity; Anti-capitalism
- Political position: Left-wing
- National affiliation: Alternative Social Movement
- Colours: Red

The Poor of Poland (Polish: Biedota Polska, BP) was a Polish political party founded on 31 May 2001 in Zgierz. It was founded shortly before the 2001 Polish parliamentary election, which it decided to participate in. The party became a part of the political coalition Alternative Social Movement. The Alternative Social Movement was composed of 37 parties, trade unions and associations in total, with the total number of members amounting to 500,000. In the 2001 election that took place in September, the coalition won 54,266 votes for the Sejm, which amounted to 0.42% of the total popular vote. After the election, the Alternative Social Movement was re-registered as a far-left, socialist party Polish Labour Party - August 80, which The Poor of Poland became a part of. However, officially the party did not dissolve until the next year, in August 2002.

The main goal of the party was to represent the interests of the poorest and weakest groups of the Polish society. As a sign of protest against high membership fees for mainstream parties, its monthly membership fee was between 1 PLN and 2 PLN, with particularly impoverished members having no obligation to pay for their membership at all. The Poor of Poland believed that the priority of public governments was to create more workplaces. Apart from that, it had a utopian program which argued that the elimination of poverty is possible. It was ideologically left-wing and opposed austerity measures as well as capitalism, which it saw as the main reason behind wealth inequality and poverty. The party eventually became a part of the Polish Labour Party - August 80, which has a radically socialist, anti-liberal and anti-capitalist program.

== History ==
The party was created out of a local anti-poverty protest movement in Łódź Voivodeship that was active in small towns of Zgierz and Skierniewice. It was then registered on 31 May 2001 as The Poor of Poland, having gained signatures and support of over 1000 people. At the time of its founding, it was reported to have 15 members.

The small town of Zgierz was chosen as the headquarters of the party. In its declaration, the chairwoman of the party Ewa Majkowska stated that it would defend the interests of the poorest parts of Polish society. The Poor of Poland then focused on attracting new members and creating subdivisions in other voivodeships. The party attracted attention through its protest against membership fees in mainstream parties - the membership fee in The Poor of Poland was nominal and amounted to between 1 PLN and 2 PLN a month, with particularly poor party members having no obligation to pay the fee at all.

In August 2001, the party joined the electoral coalition Alternative Social Movement. The Alternative Social Movement was composed of several parties and trade unions, and had a contradictory ideological nature as it included both Catholic nationalists as well as left-wing nationalists. The ideological common ground of its members was however the opposition to the centre-right government of Jerzy Buzek and his Solidarity Electoral Action. The coalition attacked neoliberal reforms of Buzek such as privatization and austerity measures, and called for his resignation.

The Alternative Social Movement was temporarily deregistered by the National Electoral Commission in August 2001, citing legal irregularities. The leadership of the coalition claimed that the deregistration of the coalition was an attempt by the Solidarity Electoral Action to suppress its political opponents, an accusation that was extensively circulated by the press.

The coalition was re-registered on 14 August 2001, as the Supreme Court of Poland annulled the decision of the National Electoral Commission, finding no irregularities that would prevent the Alternative Social Movement from registering itself and registering its own electoral committee for the 2001 Polish election. The 14 August was also the last day in which political parties could register their electoral committees for the upcoming election, meaning that the Alternative Social Movement only had 9 hours to do so.

By the time of its registration, the Alternative Social Movement was composed of 37 parties, trade unions and associations in total, and had a total membership count of 500,000. It presented itself as a movement for impoverished, frustrated and dissatisfied voters, and cooperated with steelworkers and mining unions, including individual groups of striking workers. It also opposed Polish membership in the European Union, arguing that Poland would be outcompeted by Western economies and that the European Union and its neoliberal free market would aggravate wealth inequality in Poland.

In July 2001, during the 2001 Polish floods, the MPs of the Alternative Socialist Movement donated their deputy salaries to flood victims. One of the leaders of the coalition, Mariusz Olszewski, also set up a special telephone line to coordinate transport of aid to the flood victims. The telephone line was run by the members of the party and would pick up aid packages from those who wanted to help the flood victims but had no time or were located too far away to do so in person.

The main ideological points of the coalition were agreed to be opposition to the United States and the European Union and their policies, as well as Catholic nationalism and left-wing nationalism. However, as the 2001 continued, the coalition would become increasingly left-wing, and the 'national left' faction represented by trade unions as well as The Poor of Poland, would establish a dominating role within the Alternative Social Movement.

For the 2001 Polish parliamentary election, the Alternative Social Movement fielded 865 candidates for the Sejm and 11 candidates for the Senate. Overwhelming majority of the candidates belonged to left-wing trade unions such as August '80, whereas 9 candidates for the Sejm were members of the Poor of Poland.

The election was held on 23 September 2001, and the Alternative Social Movement received 54,266 votes, or 0.42%, and did not receive any parliamentary seats. After the election, the Alternative Social Movement became re-registered as a political party Polish Labour Party - August 80, which The Poor of Poland also became a part of. The new party is far-left, heavily based on trade unions, and is ideologically socialist, anti-capitalist and anti-liberal; it also reappropiated some of the rhetoric of the Alternative Social Movement, such as its opposition to the European Union and the United States.

Despite being formally a part of the Polish Labour Party - August 80 since November 2001, The Poor of Poland still existed as a stand-alone party. It was deregistered 9 months later, on 12 August 2002.

== Election results ==
=== Sejm ===
Election year	# of votes	% of vote	# of overall seats won	+/–
2001	54 266	0.42 (#10)	0 / 460	New
2001	As part of the Alternative Social Movement.			

=== Senate ===
Election year	# of votes	% of vote	# of overall seats won	+/–
2001	296 407	1.10 (#9)	0 / 100	New
2001	As part of the Alternative Social Movement.			

== Ideology ==
The Poor of Poland was a left-wing party, and it was ideologically opposed to austerity as well as capitalism, condemning both as the main causes of poverty and wealth inequality. The party pointed to the side effects of socioeconomic transition of Poland from socialism to free-market capitalism, which divided Polish society into classes and layers, with few becoming wealthy and many being plunged into poverty. The party argued that the capitalist system is inherently unfair, stating that an overwhelming majority of low-income groups in Poland are the 'hard-working poor' which nevertheless 'have it tough all their lives'.

The party believed that one of the priorities of any government should be to ensure more workplaces and reduce the problem of unemployment. The Poor of Poland also argued against 'defeatist' attitudes regarding poverty, stating that despite the perceived inevitability in it, an appropriate socioeconomic system will make it possible to eliminate poverty completely. As part of the Alternative Social Movement, the party was particularly critical of the centre-right government of Jerzy Buzek, which it identified as the main reason behind financial hardships of Poles, given the policies of Buzek such as privatization, deregulation and austerity, along with the membership in the neoliberal European Union.

The Poor of Poland became a part of the Polish Labour Party - August 80, which calls for free education and healthcare, demands a complete halt to privatization, an establishment of an extensive welfare state in Poland, and a 35-hour working week and a high minimum wage that would be fixed to 68% of the national average. The party identifies itself as radically socialist, anti-capitalist and anti-liberal, and promotes itself as the "true left" as opposed to the "caviar left", which it identifies as the social-democratic Democratic Left Alliance.

== See also ==
- Self-Defence of the Republic of Poland
- League and Self-Defence
- Alternative Social Movement
- Polish Labour Party - August 80
- Social Justice Movement
