= Ziętek (surname) =

Ziętek is a surname. Notable people with the surname include:

- Artur Ziętek (1978–2010), Polish pilot
- Bogusław Ziętek (born 1964), Polish trade union activist
- Ewa Ziętek (born 1953), Polish actress
- Jerzy Ziętek (1901–1985), Polish politician and general
- Tomasz Ziętek (born 1989), Polish actor and musician
