= Alternative Social Movement =

Alternative Social Movement Polish: Alternatywa Ruch Społeczny
- Abbreviation: ARS
- Leader: Michał Janiszewski; Mariusz Olszewski; Daniel Podrzycki
- Founded: 18 March 2001
- Dissolved: 11 November 2001
- Preceded by: Polish Green Party (1988)
- Succeeded by: Polish Labour Party - August 80
- Headquarters: al. Wyzwolenia 18, 00-570 Warsaw
- Membership (2001): ~500,000 (Note: The total number of members of all 37 parties, trade unions and organizations that were a part of the ARS.)
- Ideology: National Catholicism; Left-wing nationalism Hard Euroscepticism; Anti-Atlanticism
- Political position: Left-wing
- Colours: Red

The Alternative Social Movement (Polish: Alternatywa Ruch Społeczny, ARS) was coalition of Polish political parties formed on 18 March 2001 in Warsaw for the 2001 Polish parliamentary election. The grouping was formed from a merger of Confederation of Independent Poland - Patriotic Camp (Polish: Konfederacja Polski Niepodległej - Obóz Patriotyczny, KPN-Ojczyzna) led by Michał Janiszewski, Tomasz Karwowski, and Janina Kraus, together with a group of politicians originating from the Christian National Union (ZChN), including Henryk Goryszewski and Mariusz Olszewski. The coalition was also joined by the Free Trade Union 'August 80' Confederation, led by Daniel Podrzycki and Bogusław Ziętek. The Alternative Social Movement was registered as a political party, and its members mainly became the activists of August 80.

In the 1997–2001 term of the Polish Sejm, ARS was represented by a parliamentary circle Alternative (Polish: Alternatywa), which included Michał Janiszewski, Tomasz Karwowski, Janina Kraus and Mariusz Olszewski (all elected in 1997 from the Solidarity Electoral Action lists). Henryk Goryszewski (also elected from the Solidarity Electoral Action list) was an unaffiliated MP at the time and remained a member of the Christian National Union. The party was a coalition of various political parties, such as Catholic nationalist ones, national conservatives, ecologists, nationalists socialists and lastly various left-wing activists and trade unionists. Ideologically, it was committed to both Catholic nationalism as well as national left, with the latter ultimately prevailing. The party then became a far-left, socialist and anti-capitalist Polish Labour Party - August 80.

== History ==
The Alternative Social Movement came first from the circle of the Polish Green Party, that ran from the lists of the social-democratic, post-communist Democratic Left Alliance in the 1993 Polish parliamentary election. Elected green activists then established the Polish Ecological Club, and started cooperation with the liberal Christian-democrat Democratic Union, which was an anti-communist, post-Solidarność formation.

After the liberal Freedom Union was formed in 1994, the greens formed the Freedom Union Ecological Forum, a faction within the party which set itself the task of promoting ecological slogans. Greens continued to work with post-Solidarność parties through the Solidarity Electoral Action, a conservative, centre-right coalition of all parties related to Solidarity.

In 2000, the greens along with other future founders of the Alternative Social Movement formed the "People's National Bloc" (Polish: Blok Ludowo-Narodowy) with the far-left Self-Defence of the Republic of Poland (Samobrona) along with the trade union WZZ 'August '80' and the nationalist Polish Front. However, the new formation was unable to agree on whom it should field as its candidate in the 2000 Polish presidential election. As a result, the bloc was dissolved and the leader of Samoobrona, Andrzej Lepper, ran independently, capturing 3.05% of the popular vote. Samoobrona presented a Catholic socialist and an agrarian socialist program, and called for a return to socialism, with Lepper arguing that Polish socialism "had not yet reached full maturity". Despite its failure, the People's National Bloc was an important inspiration for creating a similar alliance for 2001.

This green-conservative cooperation then ended with 2001, where green activists decided to cooperate with various political circles, including nationalist and left-wing ones, to form the Alternative Social Movement, which became a conglomerate of numerous, ideologically distant political formations. It comprised, on the one hand, Catholic-nationalist circles led by the Confederation of Independent Poland and, on the other, the left-wing Free Trade Union 'August '80' . The unifying factor between the various elements of the committee was criticism of the policies, particularly neoliberal economic policies, pursued by Jerzy Buzek's government.

The party emerged in 2001 in opposition to the government of Jerzy Buzek led by the centre-right Solidarity Electoral Action. Evoking the disastrous economic situation and the financial policies of the government that further aggravated the crisis, the MPs representing the Alternative Social Movement demanded that Buzek resigns from his position of Prime Minister and dismisses his cabinet.

While the party was already registered in March 2001, Polish Electoral Commission revoked the previous decision to recognize the Alternative Social Movement as a registered party in August 2001. The leaders of the party lodged a complain to the Supreme Court against the State Electoral Commission, and stated that they will seak to annul the parliamentary elections through legal means if their deregistration was to upheld. The party also sought to turn to the Court of Human Rights in Strasbourg.

The Polish Electoral Commission justified its refusal to register the electoral committee of the Alternative on the grounds that the committee does not have a valid court decision on the registration of the Alternatywa Social Movement party. The court's decision on registration in the register of political parties held by the Alternative Social Movement has not become final, as an appeal by the party from Kraków has been submitted to the Regional Court in Warsaw.

The party then alleged that its sudden deregistration after 5 months of existence was an attempt of the Solidarity Electoral Action (AWS) to suppress its political opponents. Tomasz Karwowski, one of the leaders of the party, stated: "The AWS, using the procedure for registering electoral committees, through hired people, led to a situation in which attempts were made to deny the existence of our electoral committee in order to - not because of a failure to meet the requirements of the electoral law, but because of procedural tricks and violations of the law in Poland - lead to the fact that our committee would not stand in the elections." The accusation was spread through the media, and it was also noted that the Alternative Social Movement was polling between 2 and 8%.

In July 2001, during the 2001 Polish floods, the MPs of the Alternative Socialist Movement donated their deputy salaries to flood victims. One of the leaders of the party, Mariusz Olszewski, also set up a special telephone line to coordinate transport of aid to the flood victims. The telephone line was run by the members of the party and would pick up aid packages from those who wanted to help the flood victims but had no time or were located too far away to do so in person.

On 14 August 2001, the Supreme Court of Poland ruled that the Polish Electoral Commission had no right to deregister the party, and ordered the commission to accept the electoral committee of the Alternative Social Movement, ruling that the registration in the register of political parties does not have to become final in order for a political party to be able to register an electoral committee. This day also coincided with the deadline for registering electoral committees for the 2001 election, which meant that the party had to register its committee within 9 hours.

The Alternative Social Movement presented itself as the movement for dissatisfied and frustrated voters, and built its support amongst trade unions as well as groups of striking miners and steelworkers. It was defined by its harsh criticism of the AWS government as well as the European Union, opposing the Polish membership in the EU on the basis of perceived looming wealth inequality and poverty. It was considered populist and utilized anti-establishment slogans, and visited impoverished regions.

The ARS electoral lists included candidates of the following parties:

- Confederation of Independent Poland - Patriotic Camp (Polish: Konfederacja Polski Niepodległej - Obóz Patriotyczny): National Catholic party;
- Polish Ecological Party - The Greens (Polish: Polska Partia Ekologiczna – Zielonych): environmentalists;
- The Poor of Poland (Polish: Biedota Polska): left-wing anti-austerity activists;
- National Association of Pensioners of the Republic of Poland (Polish: Krajowe Porozumienie Emerytów i Rencistów Rzeczypospolitej Polskiej): left-wing pensioner activists;
- National Revival of Poland: ultra-nationalists;
- Mikołajczykowski's Polish People's Party (Polish: Polskie Stronnictwo Ludowe Mikołajczykowskie): left-leaning agrarians;
- Polish Front: right-wing nationalists;
- a small number of parties (Christian National Union, National Party, Christian Democracy of the Third Polish Republic, Organisation of the Polish Nation - Polish League), most of whose members ran from other committees.

The Victoria Party, the Polish Enfranchisement Movement party and other organisations were also associated with the coalition: Free Trade Union "August 80", the Polish Western Union, the Kontra Trade Union, the Alliance of New Forces, the National Self-Government Agreement - Ojczyzna, the National-Robotniczy Front or the Association 'No to the European Union'.

In total, the Alternative Social Movement was supported by as many as 37 organisations, which had a combined membership of more than half a million. The party focused on the criticism of the Solidarity Electoral Action and the Polish prime minister Jerzy Buzek. The criticism that was directed at Buzek and his government mainly concerned the state of the economy, and the deregulation and privatization measures that the cabinet pursued.

With so many members and parties involved, the Alternative Social Movement had a contradicting political position defined by Euroscepticism, anti-Atlanticism, National Catholicism and left-wing nationalism. It even involved far-right parties. As the campaign continued, the party would noticeably shift to the left, with the factions representing the 'national left' gradually dominating the party and its rhetoric.

The party hoped to capture 10% of the popular vote. The polls placed the party anywhere between 2% and 8%. Ultimately, in the 2001 Polish parliamentary election on 23 September 2001, it received 54,266 votes, or 0.42%, and did not receive any parliamentary seats.

On 11 November 2001 it transformed into a unified political party - the far-left Polish Labour Party - August 80, headed by Daniel Podrzycki from the trade union WZZ "August 80", with the vice-presidents then being: Tomasz Karwowski previously from KPN-Ojczyzna, Marek Toczek from the Polish Front, and Bogusław Ziętek from the WZZ "August 80". The court re-registered ARS as APP by a decision of 28 February 2002. The core of the new party consisted mainly of activists of the WZZ "August 80", who had previously formally been members of the ARS party. In addition, APP was co-founded by parties such as KPN-Ojczyzna and Front Polski. APP renamed itself in 2004 as the Polish Labour Party and PPP in 2009 as Polish Labour Party - August 80.

The Polish Labour Party - August 80 became a far-left party, with a socialist, anti-liberal and anti-capitalist program, which reappropriated the demands of the Alternative Social Movement, such as its hostility towards the European Union and the United States. The nationalist rhetoric of the Alternative Social Movement then gave way to radical, anti-capitalist slogans.

== Election results ==
=== Sejm ===
Election year	# of votes	% of vote	# of overall seats won	+/–
2001	54 266	0.42 (#10)	0 / 460	New

=== Senate ===
Election year	# of votes	% of vote	# of overall seats won	+/–
2001	296 407	1.10 (#9)	0 / 100	New

== Ideology ==
The Alternative Social Movement criticised the activities of the Jerzy Buzek. It advocated against Poland's membership in the European Union, and particularly stressed its opposition to the conditions that the Polish government agreed to. The party also opposes Polish membership in NATO structures, as well as being opposed to any cooperation with the United States. The party argued that the Polish membership in the European Union will lead to financial ruin and wealth inequality, and wanted a second referendum in Poland that would decide the issue of European integration.

In its opposition to the European Union, the party mixed various criticisms, but the prevailing theme was that of wealth inequality. The Alternative Social Movement stated that Poland has a much weaker economy than the Western countries that dominate the European Union, which will lead to the Polish economy being completely outcompeted by other members of the European Union. The party presented itself as the party of the disattisfied and frustrated, and pursued connections with trade unions as well as individual groups of striking miners and steelworkers.

The party had a conflicting ideology, as the coalition it formed included Catholic nationalists, national conservatives, environmentalists, trade unionists, nationalist socialists as well as left-wing activists. The main ideologies of the Alternative Social Movement were described to be National Catholicism as well as leftist nationalism. Over the course of the campaign, the party's positions veered further to the left, cementing it as a left-wing movement. After the election, the Alternative Social Movement was re-registered as Polish Labour Party - August 80 (PPP). The new party reappropiated the nationalist, anti-European rhetoric of the Alternative Social Movement into radically socialist and anti-capitalist slogans; the party promoted itself as the "true left", as opposed to the "caviar left" embodied by the Democratic Left Alliance.

Ideologically, it was also compared to other nationalist parties with distinct programs in Polish politics, such as the far-right League of Polish Families as well as the far-left Self-Defence of the Republic of Poland (Samoobrona). Alternative Social Movement was a mixture of Catholic nationalist and left-wing nationalist circles, and sharply criticized the cabinet of Buzek for its neoliberal policy. League of Polish Families was a purely Catholic nationalist party and likewise attacked the government, taking an anti-capitalist stance. Lastly, socialist Samoobrona presented the interests of all impoverished social groups, especially the farmers, pensioners and unemployed - similarly to the Alternative Social Movement, Samoobrona opposed Polish membership in the EU on the basis of the European Union's neoliberal policies and wealth inequality.

As PPP, the party describes itself as a socialist grouping, with anti-liberal and anti-capitalist slogans. It party calls for a complete halt to privatisation, advocates free education and health care as well as a welfare state, a 35-hour working week and a minimum wage of 68% of the national average wage. It opposes the introduction of a flat tax, the reinstatement of the death penalty and condemns pro-American and pro-EU policies. It also calls for abolition of income tax for the poorest and an economic program that would redistribute the national income from the richest to the poorest, arguing that under the capitalist economy, the opposite process takes place, where the rich are getting wealthier at expense of the poor.

== See also ==
- Self-Defence of the Republic of Poland
- League and Self-Defence
- National Party "Fatherland"
- Confederation of Independent Poland
- League of Polish Families
- Social Justice Movement
