= Daniel Podrzycki =

Polish socialist politician (1963–2005)

1st Chairman of the Polish Labour Party
- In office 11 November 2001 – 24 September 2005
- Preceded by: Position established
- Succeeded by: Bogusław Ziętek

Personal details
- Born: June 14, 1963 Siemianowice Śląskie
- Died: 24 September 2005 (aged 42) Sosnowiec
- Party: Polish Labour Party - August 80

Daniel Tomasz Podrzycki (Polish pronunciation: [ˈdaɲɛl ˈtɔmaʂ pɔˈdʐɨtskʲi]; 14 June 1963 – 24 September 2005) was a Polish socialist politician.

Podrzycki was born in Siemianowice Śląskie. His career began from participation in the activity of illegal students' circles of Warsaw, which appeared at the end of the Seventies and were oriented at the beginning on the diccident Committee on Defending the Workers (Komitet Obrony Robotnikow) and later on the forbidden in 1981 independent trade-union movement "Solidarity" (Solidarność). Because his actively participation in this and several such organizations, Podrzycki was arrested twice by the secret police and condemned for anti-governmental activity. In 1993 Podrzycki, together with several of his nearest colleagues established and headed the independent Free Working Union "August - 80" (Wolny Zwiazek Zawodowy "Sierpien-80"). In 1993-1994 Podrzycki for the first time famous all over Poland having organized a series of massive strikes on several large industrial facilities in Southeastern area of the country. In 1997-1999 the actions WZZ "August - 80" became even more radical. Under Podrzycki's initiative pickets, demonstrations, hunger strikes, captures of administrative buildings of industrial sphere were arranged. On the threshold of 2001 Polish parliamentary election, Podrzycki, leaning on the WZZ "August - 80" infrastructure, established and headed the Movement of Public Alternative (Ruch Spoleczny Alternatywa – RSA). After the failure on 2001 Polish parliamentary election, decided to abandon the discredited brand. As a result, the RSA disappeared, and instead of it a "new" political structure with a much-promising title Alternative - Labour Party (Alternatywa - Partia Pracy, APP). However, Podrzycki again suffers failure in municipal elections and in the elections to the European Parliament. As a consequence, a year before the 2005 Polish parliamentary election, he again replaced the name of the party to the one under which it exists till now - the Polish Labour Party (Polska Partia Pracy – PPP). In July 2005, Podrzycki initiated associations of various political forces of the left orientation for participation in the parliamentary elections as the united bloc. On 24 September 2005, Podrzycki died in a car crash in Sosnowiec, southern Poland, one day before the parliamentary elections and two weeks before the presidential election where he was a candidate.

== Political positions ==
Podrzycki opposed NATO and the European Union. He advocated pulling Polish soldiers out of Iraq, free access to abortion, abolishment of conscription, 35-hour work week and Minimum Wage at the level of 68% of national average. Podrzycki was also a strong advocate of separation of church and state, so he supported the dissolution of the Concordat.
