= Social Justice Movement =

Social Justice Movement Ruch Sprawiedliwości Społecznej
- Abbreviation: RSS
- Leader: Piotr Ikonowicz
- Founded: 2 May 2014
- Registered: 5 September 2014; 18 September 2025
- Dissolved: 6 February 2023
- Headquarters: ul. 21 Pułku Piechoty Dzieci Warszawy 7 lok. 21, 03-982 Warszawa
- Membership (2014): ~1000
- Ideology: Anti-capitalism; Trade unionism Socialism; Socialist patriotism
- Political position: Far-left
- Colours: Red; White
- Sejm: 0 / 460
- Senate: 0 / 100
- European Parliament: 0 / 51
- Regional assemblies: 0 / 552
- City presidents: 0 / 117

Website
- facebook.com/ruchsprawiedliwoscispolecznej

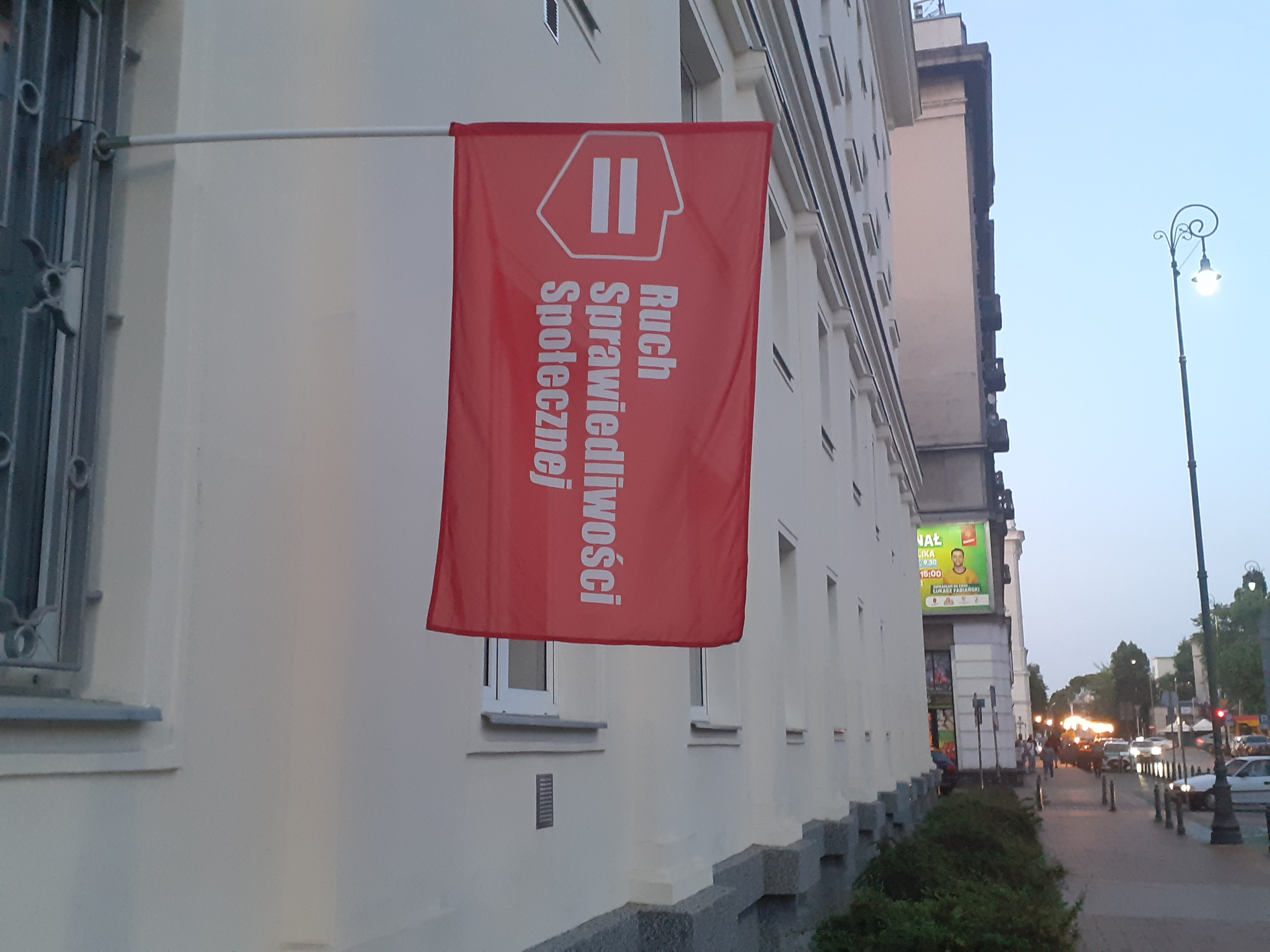
RSS Flag at the group's headquarters in Warsaw (2023)

Social Justice Movement (Polish: Ruch Sprawiedliwości Społecznej, RSS) is a Polish radical left-wing socialist political party. It was founded by Piotr Ikonowicz on 2 May 2014. and registered on 5 September 2014. The main tenet of the party is to represent the poorest and weakest in Polish society and to fight "against social exclusion, inequality and economic exploitation". The party is active politically and formed electoral lists together with other minor left-wing parties, but it never managed to gain any seats. Amongst others, the party ran together with parties such as Left Together and Labour Union, as well as independently; at the same time, it also worked together with parties such as Samoobrona. It also gathered signatures and submitted draft proposals for anti-privatization and anti-eviction laws. It was deregistered on 6 February 2023. Two years later on 18 September 2025 it was re-registered.

The RSS was founded on the basis of the Office for Social Justice (Polish: Kancelaria Sprawiedliwości Społecznej, KSS) run by Piotr Ikonowicz. Its platform prioritises abolition of the so-called junk contracts, improvement of the position of trade unions, and banning eviction "onto the street". The party focuses on social justice and support of the most underprivileged, especially the poor and the homeless. It vehemently opposes capitalism which it described as a discriminatory system which undertakes "frantic pursuit of profit maximisation at the expense of human life and dignity" and in which the capital rules people and, with socialism promoted as a much fairer system that can achieve the opposite. It has an ambivalent stance towards People's Republic of Poland, praising its progress on social justice but criticizing it for breaking up worker strikes. The party also stressed that it does not oppose nationalism nor clericalism, and praised the Catholic socialist Self-Defence of the Republic of Poland and its late leader Andrzej Lepper, whom Ikonowicz described as "a statesman".

== History ==
The party was founded as a political extension of KSS, which was registered as a social association and movement in 2010; the movement provided legal and economic assistance to "people at risk of or affected by social exclusion". In addition, the movement engaged in political actions, becoming known for slogans such as "Housing a right not a commodity!". The KSS activists also protected tenants from eviction. According to the party's leader, KSS activists concluded that evictions will never stop without a radical change, which inspired them to transform the movement into a political party in 2014.

Shortly before the registration of the party, the Polish Communist Party reacted to the news of Ikonowicz's plans to turn KSS into a political party. The Communist Party wrote a cautious endorsement, praising the anti-capitalist stance of the Social Justice Movement, but also noting that Ikonowicz was a dissident against the Polish People's Republic, which makes him "a participant in the overthrow of the communist system and builder of capitalism in Poland". Social Justice Movement later clarified that it had an ambivalent stance towards communist Poland, acknowledging its crucial role in redistribution of wealth and fighting for social justice on one hand, but condemning its tendency to break up worker strikes on the other.

In the 2014 Polish local elections, RSS fielded for mayor of Warsaw Agata Nosal-Ikonowicz (wife of the party leader), who received 1.11% of the vote, coming 9th out of 11 candidates. In the elections in Wrocław, RSS co-founded a local committee, which fielded Konrad Rychlewski for mayor., who received 0.8% of the votes, taking the last place. In the elections to the Lubusz Voivodeship Sejmik, RSS ran together with the Green Party as the Green New Deal committee, which won 0.62% of the popular vote. Before the 2015 Polish presidential election, the party supported Green candidate Anna Grodzka, who, however, failed to collect the required number of signatures required to register her candidacy. On 11 July 2015, the RSS joined the Social Movement of the Republic of Poland. In the 2015 Polish parliamentary election, RSS activists comprised almost the entire Warsaw electoral list for the Sejm (opened by Piotr Ikonowicz). An RSS activist also ran as a candidate from the party list in Lublin.

In 2016, the party gathered signatures in Warsaw for a draft resolution that would protect tenants living in buildings returned by the city of Warsaw to legal successors of pre-WW2 via reprivatization program. The party stated that tens of thousands citizens of Warsaw are affected by reprivatization, and are forced into homelessness through the new owner either termining legal agreements with the hitherto tenants or raising rent prices. The draft resolution by the party was to give Warsaw tenants affected by privatization programs a right to apply for social housing; tenants were also to be given special protection from higher rent. The party also organised a rally to help gather the necessary amount of signatures. During the rally, Ikonowicz stated: "I do not yet see in the new government the will to stand on the weaker and more numerous side, i.e. on the side of the majority of society, who do not go on holidays, who earn poorly, who do not benefit from state aid and are condemned to emigrate or to themselves."

In January 2017, Piotr Guział joined the RSS. In the 2018 Polish local elections, Piotr Ikonowicz, running with KWW Sprawiedliwości Społecznej Piotra Ikonowicza, came 9th among 14 candidates for the office of mayor of Warsaw, receiving 7271 votes (0.82% of valid votes). In the city council elections his committee received 1.19% of the popular vote. In the Gdańsk local election, RSS co-founded (among others, together with the Greens, Feminist Initiative and the Polish Initiative association) the Jolanta Banach Lepszy Gdańsk committee, which fielded IF leader Elżbieta Jachlewska for mayor. In the city council elections, it crossed the electoral threshold but failed to win any seats, and the mayoral candidate came fourth out of seven candidates, with less than two percent support. Piotr Guział ran for the Warsaw council in this election on behalf of a rival committee, and did not support Piotr Ikonowicz in the mayoral election.

In the 2019 European Parliament election in Poland, RSS ran as part of the Lewica Razem coalition, together with Left Together and Labour Union. Piotr Ikonowicz opened the LR list in the Łódź constituency and Elżbieta Wisz in the Podkarpackie constituency. There were 11 RSS members on the coalition's lists. LR did not reach the electoral threshold. In the 2019 Polish parliamentary election, although the RSS did not join the Left coalition, party member Anna Wilk-Baran ran for the Sejm from the Piła list of the SLD, and she received 995 votes.

After the failure to submit the party's financial report for 2019 (according to Piotr Ikonowicz, caused by the illness of one of the activists), the procedure for the deletion of the Social Justice Movement from the register of political parties began, but the RSS chairman then announced an application to re-register the grouping. On 6 February 2023, the District Court in Warsaw struck RSS off the register. The group's leader Piotr Ikonowicz and Anna Wilk-Baran ran for the Sejm from the lists of Nowa Lewica, formed earlier as a result of the merger of the SLD and Spring. It was re-registered on 18 September 2025.

== Ideology ==
The Social Justice Movement presented itself as "the party of the working man", and aimed to be a party that would represent poor and working-class people in local governments, as well as the Sejm and the European Parliament. Striking a populist tone, the party denounced current Polish political system as one dominated by "almost exclusively businessmen, civil servants and professional politicians" and stated its belief that the situation of Polish workers had been particularly miserable ever since 1991, as the significance of the trade union movement faded into irrelevance. The party aimed to protect the workers who "have to agree to poor working and pay conditions, to degrading treatment" and sustain violations of labour laws and non-payment of their wages.

Main aim of the party was to fight for social justice in Poland, by fighting evictions, promoting trade unions and fighting for workers' rights. The party wanted to make solidarity action legal again and endorsed it as the most effective way of securing more rights for the workers. Social Justice Movements pointed to the Polish trade union protests of 1956 and 1980 as its roots, and wanted to continue their goals, which it defined as workers' self-government, workers' ownership of their workplace and redistribution of profits. The party was particularly critical of Leszek Balcerowicz and his neoliberal Balcerowicz Plan, which transitioned Polish centrally-planned economy to a capitalist market one. The party accuses the Polish government of the 1990s of exploiting dissatisfaction with Communist Poland in order to introduce capitalism of privatisation; according to the party, striking workers fought for more democracy within the communist system, rather than for its abolition.

The party also defined itself as an anti-system and anti-establishment party that opposes "the prevailing system of exploitation and domination". As an alternative, the party promoted a political and economic system based on social justice and "true equality", as opposed to what partly consider 'formal equality' where "the rich minority rules over the millions of people who contribute to its wealth with their daily hard work". According to the party program, Social Justice Movement strived for a system based on local communities, empathy and mutual aid, a system which would replace "the relentless struggle for existence and competition with cooperation". The party also opposed Polish participation in wars, describing them as serving the interests of global corporations and "world's crooks", to the disadvantage and death of the poor.

In its program, the party stated: "The Social Justice Movement is an anti-capitalist party. We believe that the prevailing system in the world, capitalism, is leading to the disaster of our civilisation and even the planet." The main critique of capitalism involved its elitism, which the party described as "the accumulation of more and more capital in the hands of fewer and fewer people"; it also warned of incompatibility of capitalism with looming automatisation, as replacing hitherto man-operated jobs with machines under capitalism means displacing people from their jobs and causing further poverty and homelessness. Ultimately, the RSS believed that capitalism is a self-destructive and temporary system, writing: "It is therefore a system that will sooner or later destroy itself, because it cannot exist without consumers".

As an alternative to capitalism, the Social Justice Movement espoused socialism, praising it as "a just system without exploitation and privileges, based on cooperation between equal producers of common wealth". It stressed that its vision of socialism was rooted in the democratic and patriotic tradition of the pre-World War II Polish Socialist Party rather than the Soviet-type socialism of the Polish People's Republic. The party stressed its opposition to capitalism through slogans such as "Free market, enslaved people" and argued that under capitalism, people are discriminated against on the basis of their wealth. The leader of the party also stated: "We have capitalism, and the main disadvantage of capitalism is that in capitalism people do not rule, capital rules."

The party praised the communist Polish People's Party for its advancement of workers' right, social justice and redistribution of wealth in Poland, but also criticized it for its action against striking workers. Ikonowicz stated that he prefers Soviet communist to the "wild capitalism" of the West characterized by "total savagery, scrupulously concealed from the public of saturated democratic societies", but that he opposed it in the 1980s because of its tendency to break up strikes. Ikonowicz explained in an interview:

My breakthrough in thinking about the People's Republic was triggered by a question I was asked by a young man from Asturias a long time ago in Spain. He asked: "What kind of socialism is this in your country when, during the strike of our miners, your socialist government exported coal to Francoist Spain?". This question has already stayed with me and contributed to my becoming an oppositionist. Because how is it that a socialist country de facto supports the fascists against the workers?

Along with stating its anti-capitalist and social character, the party also stressed the importance of participating in elections, with Ikonowicz arguing that "The losers are all those who do not take up the fight against the system." The Social Justice Movement described itself as a part of the working people, "people of simple professions, the poor, the unemployed, tenants wronged by reprivatisation". Explaining the difference between the RSS and other left-wing parties, Ikonowicz stressed the 'class authenticity' of his party, stating that only his party represents the interests of the proletariat and excluded groups. Despite electorally working together, Ikonowicz called Democratic Left Alliance "the pretended left" and stated that Left Together does not represent class interests, instead representing "young people from big cities; relatively not doing badly in life". He also stressed the need of making Poles 'class-aware', arguing that most Poles do not belong to the middle class, as they "have taken flats on credit, have little time for their children because they are owned by corporations. And they don't have the state on their side, because it sides with the employer and the bailiff for the time being."

The party was friendly of the Polish left-wing populist Andrzej Lepper and his agrarian socialist party Self-Defence of the Republic of Poland. Ikonowicz stated that Lepper "was able to move disadvantaged people, but was hounded by political elites" and that he considers him a "politician with class - And I would even say a statesman." Ikonowicz also clarified that the Social Justice Movement is not an anti-clerical party and does not oppose religion. Ikonowicz stated that socialism "gets along well" with Christianity. Ikonowicz praised Pope Francis as the "pastor of the left" and argued that Polish Catholics have been hitherto blind to his teachings; he also stated that he sees a common ground between the left and at least some of the clergy. The party also emphasized that it does not oppose nationalism, and that it worked together with nationalist left-wing activists such as Sławomir Izdebski from Self-Defence Rebirth.

== See also ==
- Polish Communist Party (2002)
- Polish Socialist Party
- Self-Defence of the Republic of Poland
- Polish Left
- Labour Union (Poland)
