= Piotr Ikonowicz =

Polish politician

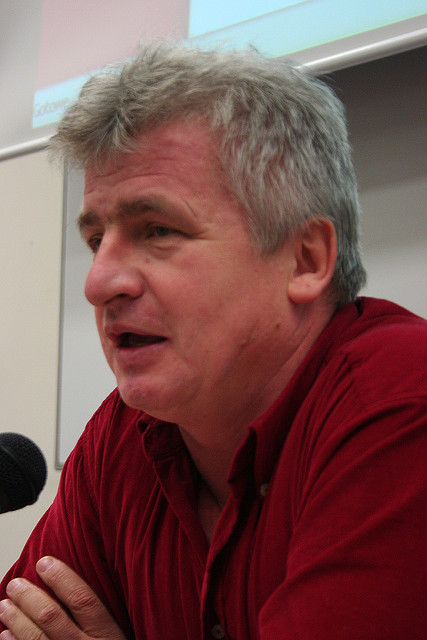

Personal details
- Born: May 14, 1956 (age 70) Pruszków
- Citizenship: Polish
- Party: Democratic Left Alliance; Polish Socialist Party; Social Justice Movement
- Education: University of Warsaw
- Profession: Journalist, translator
- Website: https://www.facebook.com/ikonowicztv IkonowiczTV channel

Piotr Igor Ikonowicz ([ˈpiɔt iɡɔr ˈikɔnɔvit͡sz]; born 14 May 1956 in Pruszków) is a Polish politician.

A graduate of the faculty of Law and Administration of the Warsaw University and the Institute of Geography of Developing States, in the early 1980s he engaged himself in socialist anti-government activities, for which he was arrested and imprisoned in 1981. Released soon afterwards, following the imposition of the Martial Law in Poland he was again arrested and sentenced to 1.5 years in prison for organization of May Day demonstration independently from the communist authorities.

Following the first free elections in post World War II Poland in 1989, Ikonowicz was one of the founders of the new Polish Socialist Party. A member of the Sejm, in 2000 he unsuccessfully ran in the presidential elections. Currently he was one of the leaders of the New Left party.

Ikonowicz is active in The Office of Social Justice (Kancelaria Sprawiedliwości Społecznej), an organisation supporting tenants who can be evicted.

== Arrest for taking part in battery ==
He was arrested in 2000 for assault and battery on a landlord, who evicted a retired couple from their home. Eight years later, after a trial, he was sentenced to 6 months of restricted freedom of movement and obligatory social work. However, Ikonowicz refused to carry out the social work part of his sentence and was sentenced to mandatory 90 days in prison starting on 14 October 2013. He didn't show up to prison, and police had to arrest him on 30 October 2013. He appealed to the president for a pardon, however Bronisław Komorowski refused.

== Personal life ==
Piotr Ikonowicz is a son of the journalist Mirosław Ikonowicz and Russian chef Olga Borkowska. His sister, Magda Gessler, is famous Polish chef and TV personality. Ikonowicz was married with Zuzanna Dąbrowska, a journalist.
