= Bogusław Ziętek =

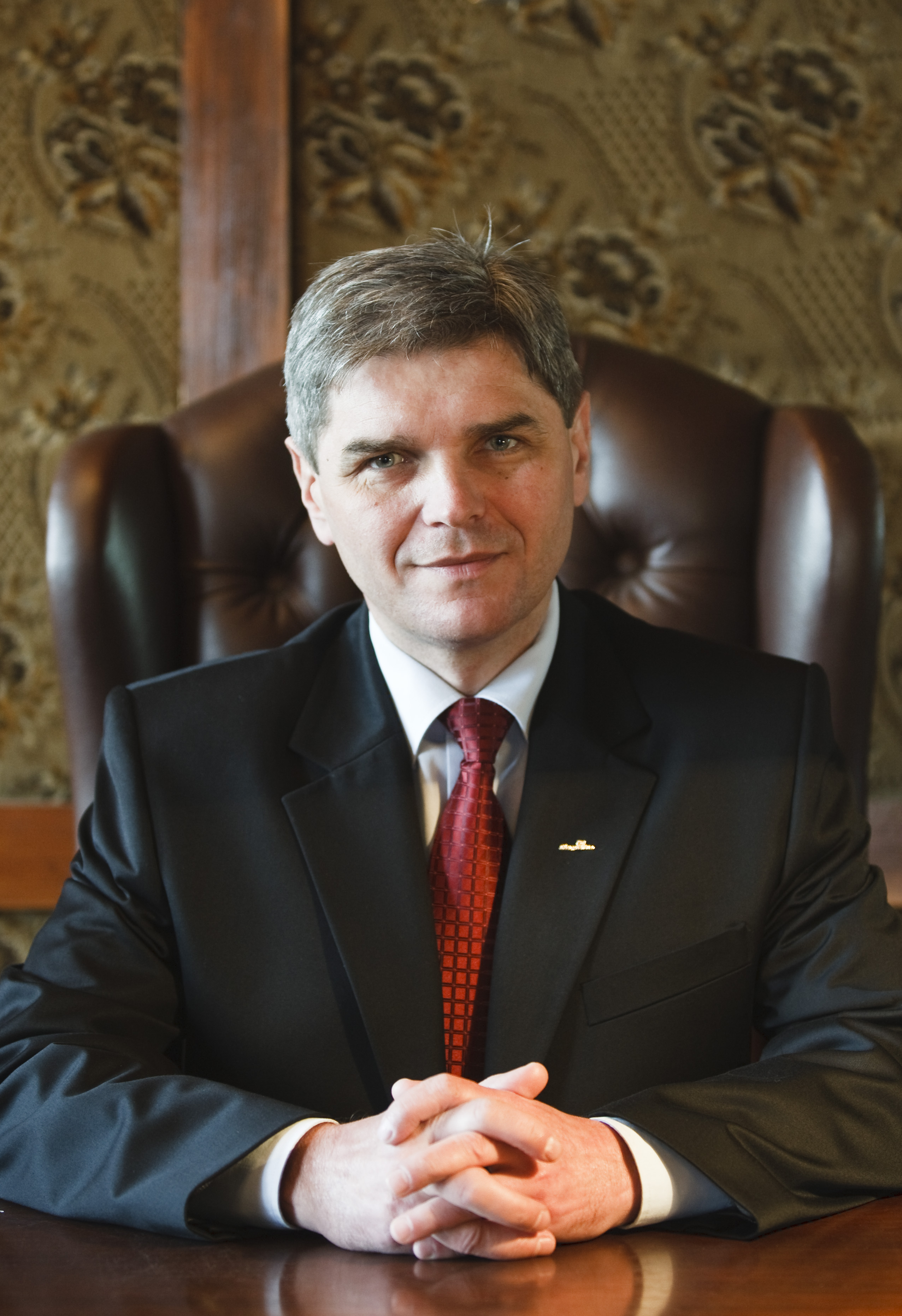

2nd Chairman of the Polish Labour Party
- In office 30 October 2005 – 24 January 2017; Acting: 1 May 2013 - 24 January 2017
- Preceded by: Daniel Podrzycki
- Succeeded by: office abolished

Personal details
- Born: October 9, 1964 (age 61) Zawiercie, Poland
- Party: Polish Labour Party (until 2017)

Bogusław Zbigniew Ziętek (born October 9, 1964) is a Polish trade union activist, co-founder and leader of Free Trade Union "August 80" (Wolny Związek Zawodowy "Sierpień 80"). Between 2005 and 2017 he has been the leader of the Polish Labour Party.

== Career ==
He has a medium technical education. He was candidate for Sejm three times. First time in 2001 (as member of Alternatywa Ruch Społeczny), in the Gliwice electoral district he got 379 votes. In 2005 (as member of the Polish Labour Party) he got 1199 in the Sosnowiec electoral district. In 2007, again for PLP and in the same district, he got 2233 votes.

In the 2004 European Parliament election, as candidate of PLP in the Silesian constituency he got 442 votes. He tried the same in the same constituency at the 2009 election again for PLP and got 3666 votes.

On April 25, 2010 he registered his own committee for the presidential election. On May 7 National Electoral Commission registered him as candidate for the office of President of Poland. In the election he got only 0.18% of votes and did not get into the second round.

== Political opinion ==
Ziętek supports: taxation of clergy, abolition of immunity for the MPs, liquidation of the Senate, legalization of civil unions, liquidation of Institute of National Remembrance and Central Anticorruption Bureau.
