= Adam Gierek =

Polish politician

Adam Gierek (pronounced [ˈadam ˈɡʲɛrɛk]; born on 17 April 1938 in Zwartberg, Limburg, Belgium) is a Polish politician and former Member of the European Parliament (MEP) for the Silesian Voivodship, serving from 2001 to 2019. During his time in the European Parliament, he was a member of the Democratic Left Alliance-Labor Union, part of the Socialist Group, and sat on the European Parliament's Committee on Industry, Research and Energy. He is a son of Edward Gierek.

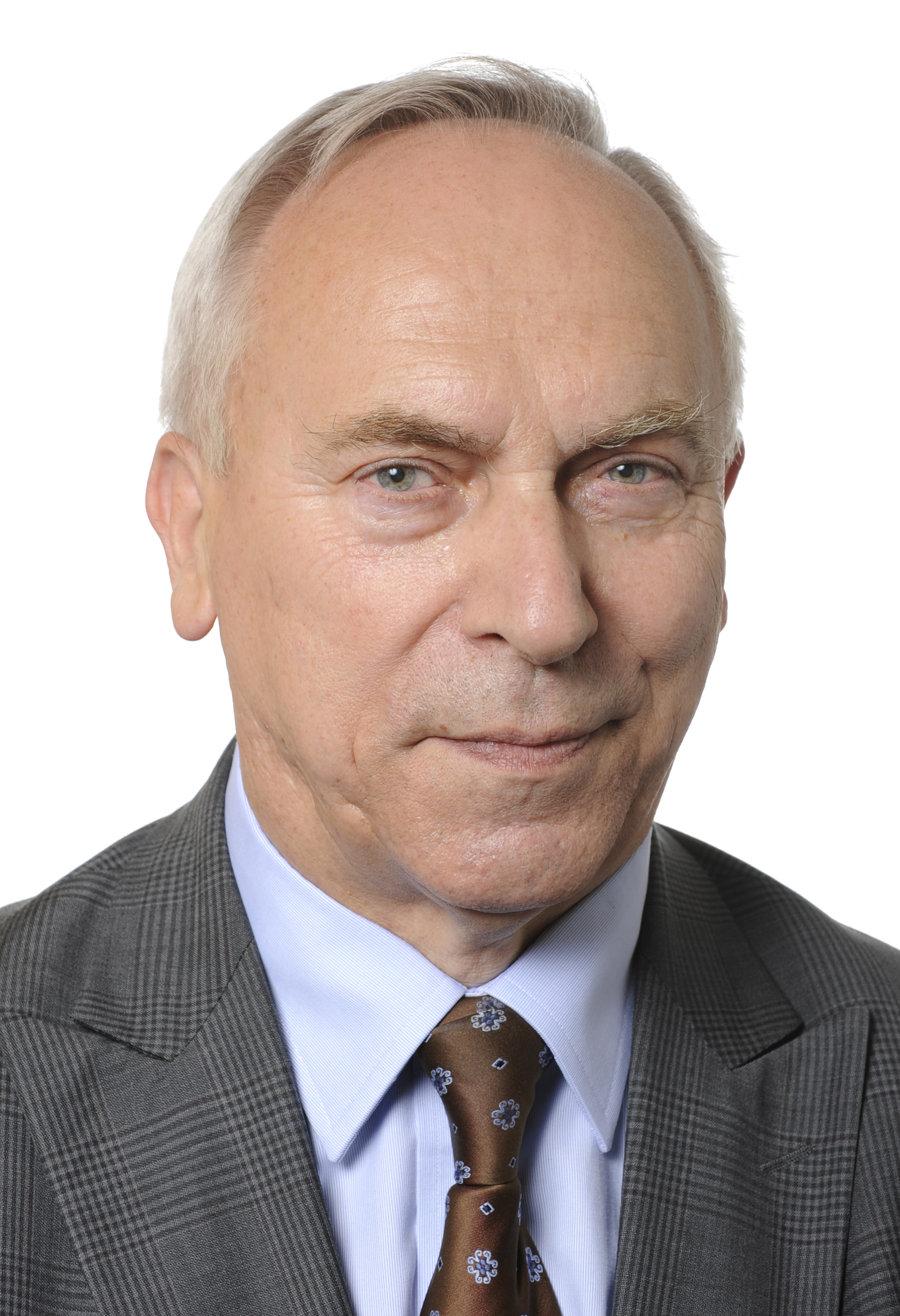

Gierek was also a substitute for the Committee on Culture and Education, a member of the Delegation to the EU-Kazakhstan, EU-Kyrgyzstan and EU-Uzbekistan Parliamentary Cooperation Committees, and for relations with Tajikistan, Turkmenistan and Mongolia and a substitute for the Delegation to the ACP-EU Joint Parliamentary Assembly.

== Education ==
- 1961: Master's in Engineering
- 1965: Doctorate
- 1968: Assistant professor
- 1972: Associate professor
- 1978: Professor of technical sciences

== Career ==
- Since 1973: Associate member of the Polish Academy of Sciences (Polska Akademia Nauk)
- 1961-1962: Assistant
- 1962-1965: Post-graduate doctoral student in Moscow
- 1965-1968: Tutor
- 1968-1972: Assistant professor
- since 1972: Professor at the Silesian University of Technology
- 1969-1972: Head of the foundry institute
- 1972-1982: Head of the Metallurgical Sciences and Technology Department, director of the Institute of Materials Engineering
- 1982-1989: Visiting professor at the Technische Universität Dresden
- Head of the Department of Materials Technology
- Since 1994: Head of the Department of Technology, Metal Alloys and Composites
- 2001-2004: Senator of the Republic of Poland, member of the Committee on Science, Education and Sport
- 2001-2003: Member of the Committee on Legislation, Law and Order
- 2004: Member of the Committee on Environmental Protection
- Since 1970: Member of the Polish Federation of Engineering Associations (NOT)
- Member of the board of the All-Poland E
- Since 2001: Gierek Association
- Member of the Polish Nuclear Society (PTN) and committees of the Polish Academy of Sciences

== Decorations ==
- Order of the 'Banner of Labour, Second Class', Knight's Cross of the Order of Poland Reborn, Gold Medal of Merit for Defence of the Nation, National Education Medal

== See also ==
- 2004 European Parliament election in Poland
