= Polish Labour Party - August 80 =

Polish Labour Party - August 80 Polska Partia Pracy – Sierpień 80
- First leader: Daniel Podrzycki (2001–2005)
- Last leader: Bogusław Ziętek (2005–2017)
- Founded: 11 November 2001
- Dissolved: 24 January 2017
- Headquarters: ul. Wyzwolenia 18, 00-570 Warsaw
- Ideology: Socialism; Marxism; Anti-capitalism; Left-wing nationalism
- Political position: Left-wing to far-left
- European affiliation: European Anti-Capitalist Left
- Colours: Red

Website
- www.partiapracy.pl

The Polish Labour Party - August 80 (Polish: Polska Partia Pracy-Sierpień 80, PPP) was a minor left-wing to far-left political party in Poland, describing itself as socialist. It was created on 11 November 2001 as the Alternative – Labour Party (Alternatywa – Partia Pracy) and acquired its new name of Polish Labour Party (Polska Partia Pracy) in 2004, before adding the suffix -August 80 (Sierpień 80) on 20 November 2009. The party was affiliated with the Free Trade Union "August 80".

== Positions ==
The party describes itself as a socialist, with anti-liberal and anti-capitalist slogans. It calls for a complete halt to privatisation, advocates free education and health care as well as a welfare state, a 35-hour working week and a minimum wage of 68% of the national average wage. It opposes the introduction of a flat tax, the reinstatement of the death penalty and condemns pro-American and pro-EU policies. It also calls for abolition of income tax for the poorest and an economic program that would redistribute the national income from the richest to the poorest, arguing that under the capitalist economy, the opposite process takes place, where the rich are getting wealthier at expense of the poor.

The PPP takes a strict anti-capitalist position, and particularly focuses on opposing privatization. It calls for "strict defence of an independent Poland", and opposes NATO as a "terrorist organization". The party does not cooperate with other Polish left-wing parties, and denounced the Democratic Left Alliance as an "anti-worker party"; instead, it had ties with the French far-right politician Jean Le Pen, along with the Catholic Radio Maryja. In the 2010s, it started reorienting itself towards a nationalist profile, and moved towards "nationalist-conservative and nationalist-patriotic positions".

== History ==
The Party's candidate in the 2005 Polish presidential election, Daniel Podrzycki, died in a car accident on September 24, 2005, one day prior to the parliamentary elections. The party achieved 91,266 votes or 0.77% in the 2005 elections, In the 2007 parliamentary elections the party won 0.99% of the popular vote and no seats in the Sejm and the Senate of Poland.

On 14 September 2015, the PPP joined the United Left (ZL) electoral alliance which was formed as a response for the poor performance of the Polish Left in the 2015 presidential election. The alliance received 7.6% of the vote in the 2015 parliamentary election below the 8% electoral threshold leaving it with no parliamentary representation.

== Election results ==
=== Presidential ===
Election year	Candidate	1st round		2nd round	
Election year	Candidate	# of overall votes	% of overall vote	# of overall votes	% of overall vote
2010	Bogusław Ziętek	29,548	0.18 (#9)		

=== Sejm ===
Election	Leader	Votes	%	Seats	+/–	Government
2005	Bogusław Ziętek	91,266	0.77 (#11)	0 / 460	New	Extra-parliamentary
2007	Bogusław Ziętek	160,476	0.99 (#7)	0 / 460	0	Extra-parliamentary
2011	Bogusław Ziętek	79,086	0.55 (#8)	0 / 460	0	Extra-parliamentary

=== European Parliament ===
Election	Votes	%	Seats	+/–	Government
2004	32,807	0.54 (#15)	0 / 54	New	Extra-parliamentary
2009	51,872	0.70 (#10)	0 / 50	0	Extra-parliamentary

== See also ==
- Polish Communist Party (2002)
- Socialist Alternative (Poland)
- Workers' Democracy (Poland)
- Young Socialists (Poland)
