= Polish Left =

Polish political party

Polish Left Polska Lewica
- Abbreviation: PL
- Leader: Jacek Zdrojewski
- Founded: January 5, 2008; 18 years ago
- Split from: Democratic Left Alliance
- Headquarters: Krakowskie Przedmieście, Warsaw
- Ideology: Social democracy Democratic socialism
- Political position: Left-wing
- National affiliation: Democratic Left (2022–)
- Colors: Red
- Sejm: 0 / 460
- Senate: 0 / 100
- European Parliament: 0 / 51
- Regional Assemblies: 0 / 555

Website
- www.polskalewica.pl

The Polish Left (Polish: Polska Lewica) is a left-wing political party in Poland.

== History ==
The former Prime Minister Leszek Miller announced the formation of the Polish Left on September 20, 2007, because he was not on the list of Left and Democrats. In his announcement, Miller said that the new party would be a "true leftist" alternative to the LiD coalition. In 2007 elections Leszek Miller started from the Self-Defence of the Republic of Poland.

The Polish Left party was formed when the Prime Minister and many other members of parliament withdrew from the Democratic Left Alliance, which Miller had headed for many years. His departure from the DLA also served as a public protest against the policies of party leaders, regarded by the protesters as not liberal enough.

Miller was the leader of the party from 2001 to 2004. Other prominent members are the former Secretary General of the DLA, Marek Dyduch, and former Sejm Member Krzysztof Jagiełło.

Before the 2019 elections, Polish Left got into litigations with Democratic Left Alliance and put up three candidates for senators including Monika Jaruzelska who was criticized by some left-wing politicians for conservatives views. Leszek Miller, current MEP from SLD declared that it is likely to create a new leftist party or coalition in opposition to the SLD and The Left.
