= Homeland Patriotic Movement =

Homeland Patriotic Movement Polish: Ruch Patriotyczny „Ojczyzna”
- Abbreviation: RPO
- Leaders: Adam Słomka; Elżbieta Postulka; Jan Olszewski; Andrzej Gąsienica-Makowski; Marian Jurczyk
- Founded: 28 July 1998
- Dissolved: 18 November 1998
- Headquarters: Warsaw
- Newspaper: Orzeł Biały
- Membership (1998): ~14000
- Ideology: Traditionalist conservatism; Social market economy; Economic nationalism; Catholic nationalism; Euroscepticism
- Political position: Right-wing
- Religion: Roman Catholic
- Members: KPN-OP; ROP; KPEiR RP; BdP; SND; PPE-Z
- Colors: Red; White; Yellow
- Slogan: Fatherland of human affairs (Polish: Ojczyzna ludzkich spraw); So much homeland as property and justice (Polish: Tyle ojczyzny, ile własności i sprawiedliwości)

The Homeland Patriotic Movement (Polish: Ruch Patriotyczny „Ojczyzna”, RPO) was a right-wing electoral coalition created for the 1998 Polish local elections. It was a coalition of numerous right-wing formations as well as an environmentalist party and left-wing trade unions, and sought to present a right-wing alternative to the centre-right Christian-democratic Solidarity Electoral Action. The founding parties of the coalition were a part of the Solidarity Electoral Action in the 1997 Polish parliamentary election, but left it over political and ideological disagreements. The main party in the coalition was the Nonpartisan Bloc for Support of Reforms, renamed to Bloc for Poland (Polish: Blok dla Polski). Despite running an aggressive and dynamic campaign, the coalition finished 6th and won 3.19% of the popular vote, winning 256 council seats in total (out of 63.767), including 2 out of 855 seats in the voivodeship sejmiks. The coalition dissolved shortly after the election, but its members continued their cooperation, founding the Alternative Social Movement for the 2001 Polish parliamentary election.

The coalition presented itself as an anti-establishment, independent force that represented the "true right", contrasting itself with the centre-right Solidarity Electoral Action. It opposed the Polish membership in the European Union and NATO, postulating the need to protect Polish agriculture and production from foreign capital, and criticizing the European Union for neoliberal economic policies. It represented the Catholic-nationalist and traditional-conservative faction of the Polish post-Solidarity movement opposed to the policies of the moderate centre-right government. Despite being described as "radically right-wing", the coalition presented a redistributive economic program, decrying wealth inequality and poverty. It opposed privatization and market deregulation, and postulated the need to re-nationalize Polish economy along with providing extensive social welfare and subsidies for unprofitable workplaces. It took a hostile stance to private industry, portraying it as unaccountable and arguing that business owners should not be able to earn 10 times more than their employees.

== History ==
=== Origins ===
The coalition was formed from the initiative of the Nonpartisan Bloc for Support of Reforms (BBWR), which was a Christian-democratic, centre-right party formed by the supporters of President Lech Wałęsa. The BBWR was to be the official party of the President Wałęsa and represent his interests and political agenda in the parliament. Wałęsa distanced himself from the party after the 1993 Polish parliamentary election, in which the BBWR massively underperformed, receiving 746,653 votes (5.41% of the popular vote) and narrowly crossing the 5% electoral threshold.

In the 1995 Polish presidential election, Wałęsa started out with abysmal approval, but the race soon became competitive as Wałęsa started regaining support over the course of the campaign. However, the numerous right-wing parties and formations were unable to unite themselves in support of Wałęsa, leading to a victory of the post-communist, social-democratic Aleksander Kwaśniewski. Following his defeat, Wałęsa formed the Christian-democratic Christian Democracy of the Third Polish Republic, which joined a new project to unite all centre-right Polish parties under a single banner - the Solidarity Electoral Action.

Wałęsa then appealed to BBWR to withdraw their candidature for the 1997 Polish parliamentary election in favour of endorsing the Solidarity Electoral Action. However, most of the party refused to do so, and ran in the election anyway. The party won 1.36% of the popular vote and failed to cross the 5% electoral threshold, losing all of its seats in the Sejm. In November 1997, the activists of the party transformed the Nonpartisan Bloc for Support of Reforms into Bloc for Poland (Polish: Blok Dla Polski).

In the 1997 election, the Solidarity Electoral Action gained the plurality of seats and formed a majority government together with the liberal Freedom Union. The new centre-right government pursued free-market reforms and advocated speedy integration of Poland into the European Union as well as NATO. This alienated a fraction of Polish right-wing politicians, with many conservatives and nationalists holding anti-EU and anti-NATO views, along with being critical of the free market to varying degrees. Critical of the course of the new centre-right government, the former Prime Minister Jan Olszewski decided to form the Homeland Patriotic Movement to contest the 1998 local election with a handful of minor right-wing parties that split from the Solidarity Electoral Action.

=== Foundation ===
On 28 July 1998, the Bloc for Poland, together with Movement for Reconstruction of Poland (ROP), Confederation of Independent Poland - Patriotic Camp (Polish: Konfederacja Polski Niepodległej - Obóz Patriotyczny, KPN-OP) and the National Association of Pensioners of the Republic of Poland (Polish: Krajowe Porozumienie Emerytów i Rencistów RP, KPEiR RP) signed an agreement to form a coalition for the 1998 local elections. They were then joined by the National Democratic Party (Polish: Stronnictwo Narodowo-Demokratyczne, SND) associated with the right-wing National Democracy movement as well as the Polish Ecological Party "Greens" (Polish: Polska Partia Ekologiczna "Zieloni", PPE-Z), an environmentalist party. Some right-leaning trade unions also joined the coalition, such as the Trade Union "Contra" (Polish: Związek Zawodowy Kontra). It was also joined by the left-wing populist Free Trade Union "August 80".

The main electoral opponent of the Homeland Patriotic Movement was the Solidarity Electoral Action, which as a grand coalition of all centre-right parties and movements, tried to unite all right-leaning Polish voters under its banner - by 1998, Polish politics seemed to be consolidating into a two-party system between the centre-right, Christian-democratic Solidarity Electoral Action, and the social-democratic, post-communist Democratic Left Alliance. Attempting to emerge as the 'third force' in the election, the Homeland Patriotic Movement was seen as a right-wing equivalent of the left-wing Social Alliance, which was a coalition of left-wing parties such as Polish People's Party, Labour Union, National Party of Retirees and Pensioners and the Self-Defence of the Republic of Poland. The Social Alliance portrayed itself as the 'independent left' and sought to provide a left-wing alternative to Democratic Left Alliance, while also challenging the emerging two-party system.

=== 1998 campaign ===
The coalition ran an aggressive campaign and was highly critical of the Solidarity Electoral Alliance. The coalition bought slots in public television stations, and was mostly represented by the former Prime Minister Jan Olszewski, who accused the Solidarity Electoral Action of betraying right-wing voters and finding a working compromise with former communists instead of persecuting them. He claimed that the party was supposed to "hold accountable those who ordered the shooting of their own people and sold themselves to foreign powers". The public service broadcaster, Telewizja Polska, interrupted the coalition's broadcasts in October 1998. Telewizja Polska argued that it had to stop the broadcast as it violating the 'personal rights' of attacked politicians. The National Electoral Commission ruled that Telewizja Polska had no right to interrupt the broadcast. The coalition was praised for its slick and provocative advertisements, full of "videos with fabricated scenes, in-house studio run by two presenters, factual and positive content".

The main focus of the coalition was the Solidarity Electoral Action, which the Homeland Patriotic Movement decried as "post-communists posing as conservative opposition". The coalition particularly attacked the plans of the Solidarity Electoral Action to bring Poland into the European Union and NATO; the RPO opposed Polish membership in both structured and criticized the European Union as a neoliberal institution that wants to build unity on "money and killing identities". The coalition stressed the need to protect Polish production and Polish property "against foreign hands" and against the "threat posed by accession to the EU". Economically however, the RPO ran to the right of the Homeland Patriotic Movement, promoting nationalization, social welfare and social market economy. It condemned privatization and presented it as the main cause for unemployment, as caused by unprofitable workplaces being sold out. The coalition presented itself as one that would protect the workers from unemployment by nationalizing and subsidizing unprofitable workplaces instead of privatizing them, and argued that it would seek to prioritize basic needs of citizens instead of "glamorous or spectacular projects" that the Polish government was pursuing.

The coalition had its own newspaper, the White Eagle (Polish: Orzeł Biały), which completemented its television advertisements. The party ran on slogans such as "Fatherland of human affairs" and "So much homeland as property and justice", trying to present its left-leaning economic stances and concern with wealth inequality and economic justice. It had around 14000 members in total and pledged to pursue the economic enfranchisement of the local population if elected to regional councils. It presented proposals such as cheap communical flats and housing, along with development of education. Despite identifying the Solidarity Electoral Action as its main electoral opponent, the Homeland Patriotic Movement would form local coalitions with it in regions where the post-communist Democratic Left Alliance had an electoral advantage; this coalition took place in places like the Słupsk Voivodeship. Ultimately, the Homeland Patriotic Movement performed best in places where it did form coalitions with the Solidarity Electoral Action.

The Homeland Patriotic Movement attracted widespread media attention, mostly thanks to the presence of former Prime Minister Jan Olszewski - its coverage was equal to that of the "independent left-wing" Social Alliance. Ultimately however, in the 1998 Polish local elections, the Homeland Patriotic Movement won 3.19% of the popular vote and finished 6th. The result was considered disappointing, especially since the Solidarity Electoral Action was successful in capturing the right-wing vote, finishing first in the election. The Homeland Patriotic Movement was also overtaken by the Polish Family Association (Polish: Stowarzyszenie Rodzina Polska), a National-Catholic coalition supported by the popular Catholic media Radio Maryja. The Polish Family Association won 5.2% of the popular vote. The campaign of the left-wing Social Alliance was considering successful, as it captured 12% of the popular vote and finished third.

=== Aftermath ===
In total, the coalition won 256 councillor seats in total out of 63.767, including 2 seats in the voivodeship sejmiks (out of 855), 48 provincial (powiat) seats (out of 10.290), and 206 municipal (gmina) seats (out of 52.622). This amounted to 0.4% of all available seats. Despite winning a greater share of the popular vote, the Polish Family Association won even less seats because of the very high regionalization of its vote - it won 151 seats in total, or 0.2% of all available seats. In contrast, in the 1997 Polish parliamentary election, the parties that founded the Homeland Patriotic Movement won 7% of the popular vote in total. The failure of both the Homeland Patriotic Movement and Polish Family Association was attributed to the Solidarity Electoral Action, which co-opted key proposals of both committees and united the right-wing vote. The Solidarity Electoral Action ultimately got 20 times more seats than its right-wing rivals. It was found the Homeland Patriotic Movement performed the best in places where it entered tactical anti-postcommunist coalition with the Solidarity Electoral Action.

The coalition was dissolved shortly after the election, given the underwhelming performance. It disintegrated in November as its members would leave the party. The main party behind the Homeland Patriotic Movement, the Bloc for Poland, signed an agreement with the left-wing agrarian Polish People's Party to run on the party's electoral lists in the 2001 Polish parliamentary election. Only the leader of the Bloc for Poland won a seat, and soon after the 2001 election, Bloc for Poland abandoned political activity and was dissolved. Other members of the coalition, despite their diverse ideologies, became natural allies and continued their cooperation, first by forming the "People's National Bloc" (Polish: Blok Ludowo-Narodowy) with the far-left Self-Defence of the Republic of Poland, and then founding the Alternative Social Movement for the 2001 election. The Alternative Social Movement combined Catholic nationalism with left-wing nationalism, with the latter ultimately prevailing.

== Ideology ==
The Homeland Patriotic Movement was described as a "radically right-wing" coalition. It presented itself as the anti-establishment "true right" in contrast to the Solidarity Electoral Action, and presented a radical decommunisation program that included the proposal of 'lustration' to thoroughly investigate former communist servants and informants, and ban them from holding a public office. The coalition also spoke for a regulated, 'pro-family' economy that would focus on small-sized domestic enterprises, while heavily restricting big corporations and halt privatization and deregulation reforms. Instead of free market, the coalition spoke for an economy that would be based on the Catholic principles of justice as well as subsidiarity, promoting social market economy that would replace the hitherto neoliberal course that Poland had taken. The rhetoric of the Homeland Patriotic Movement was also described as sovereignist and National-Catholic.

In their posters, the RPO declared: "Our program is short, away with thieves and spies in our public life!" The coalition presented itself as a united front of 'national-patriotic forces' that would stand against the domination of post-communist parties in Polish politics, in which it included the centre-right Solidarity Electoral Action because of their perceived tendency to cooperate with post-communist groupings. It attacked Lech Wałęsa, Tadeusz Mazowiecki and Adam Michnik as "blurrers" of the division into anti-communist and post-communist Polish forces, denouncing them as "post-communists who elected themselves as conservative opposition". The Homeland Patriotic Movement compared itself to the interwar Sanacja movement and promoted the cult of personality of Józef Piłsudski.

The party presented a reformist program in regards to the constitutional issues, decrying the Polish electoral law as unfair and unclear, and postulated the need of introducing a system that would be more transparent. It argued that local and regional governments are underfunded and are powerless to manage local issues. The coalition believed that the central government in Warsaw is bloated and should not only redistribute the funds to local governments, but also devolve more powers to them. The RPO also argued against proportional representation, comparing it to the interwar "Sejmocracy", which was the name for a period in the Second Polish Republic before the May Coup, characterized by political instability. In its place, the coalition proposed single-member constituencies.

=== Economic policy ===
The coalition presented itself as the choice of 'patriotic and honest voters', presenting itself as a movement that is above 'political bargains' and corruption. It stated that it will seek to implement policies that were either neglected or abandoned by the Solidarity Electoral Action, such as the implementation of a "pro-family economy", general enfranchisement, stricter penal code, and restructurization of mining and metallurgy industries "in the interests of Poland rather than the European Union"; the coalition sought to nationalize heavy industries in Poland, decrying their privatization as surrender to foreign capital. It pledged to strive for an economy based on 'social good' based on social welfare and social market economy; it argued that this can only be achieved by harmonizing the relations between local and national governments, especially on issues such as nationalization and welfare programs. It also argued that the state has a duty to rescue unprofitable workplaces such as the Gdańsk Shipyard, arguing that privatizating such industries betrays Polish interests and makes local workers lose their jobs; the alternative proposed by the party was nationalization and subsidies. Lastly, the Homeland Patriotic Movement stated that it would pursue economic policies to guarantee basic needs of citizens, accusing the current government of pursuing "glamorous or spectacular projects, which in addition involve enormous costs".

Apart from promoting social welfare and nationalization, the coalition also stood out economically by decrying wealth inequality and the corruption of private enterprises, differentiating itself from other right-wing formations. It argued that it is unacceptable for business owners to earn 10 times more than most of their workers, and argued that most of the local governments work on the same unfair basis, where mayors have high salaries while minor public officials have very low income. The Homeland Patriotic Movement proposed anti-trust and transparency laws that would investigate the real costs of services that private businesses perform for local governments, arguing that high costs of water, waste disposal and public transport might be result of greed and lack of accountability. The coalition stated that in many ways, the dysfunction and corruption associated with the Polish People's Party and its public-owned workplaces can no longer be found in state-run industries, but rather in the privatized ones, especially those that had been acquired by the foreign capital.

=== Foreign policy ===
Focusing on the Solidarity Electoral Action as its main opponent, the Homeland Patriotic Movement represented a strand of Catholic, traditional-conservative and anti-EU politicians and voters that were opposed to the moderate course of the centre-right government. The coalition deeply opposed the proposals of "speedy accession" to the NATO and EU, and instead opposed the membership of Poland in both of these structures. The European Union was portrayed as a threat to the identity, economy and sovereignty of Poland. The EU was described as an organization that builds "unity on money and killing identities"; the RPO argued that the EU pursues a centralizing, uniform neoliberal economic policy that aims at "levelling all that does not fit a common pattern". The coalition presented itself as the only formation that would "support Polish agriculture and Polish production in the face of the threat posed by accession to the EU, and protect Polish property against foreign hands".

=== Rhetoric ===
The media also noted that the Homeland Patriotic Movement had a staunchly populist and anti-establishment rhetoric. It ran a heavily mixed campaign, on one hand including colorful advertisements featuring sketches, while also using 'solemn' advertisement that promoted heavily religious, Catholic nationalist rhetoric. The coalition presented itself as the 'true right' that 'has no money', which it presented as a proof of its honesty and incorruptibility, as opposed to the centre-right Solidarity Electoral Action, which the RPO attacked as heavily corrupt and aristocratic. Its rhetoric also included accusations of conspiracies, bargains of the centre-right government with post-communist groupings, and allegations of electoral fraud. At the same time, it promoted light-hearted proposals, such as pledging to draft a new Broadcasting Act that would make football broadcasts guaranteed by law on state television.

The populist rhetoric of the Homeland Patriotic Movement was contrasted with that of the left-wing populist Social Alliance, who promoted anti-capitalist and anti-austerity slogans, and warned of "annihilation of agriculture, the bankruptcy of national industry, the massive buyout of Polish land and widespread misery". The RPO ran a somewhat similar campaign but one that was staunchly right-wing rather than radically left-wing, and as such focused on social issues, as well as Catholic and nationalist slogans. Media concluded that the 1998 elections showed a large group of voters who are "dissatisfied, frustrated, losing out on the changes, basically indifferent to religion or even anti-clerical"; this group of voters was to deliver the Social Alliance victory, thanks to its anti-capitalist and socioeconomic slogans. The news magazine Polityka argued that this group of voters is embodied by Andrzej Lepper and his Self-Defence of the Republic of Poland. Given the populist, anti-establishment and reformist characters of both coalition, the media observed that "the program of the right-wing Patriotic Fatherland Movement can be harmonised with the declaration of the left-wing Social Alliance without much effort."

== Election results ==
Election year	% of vote	# of overall seats won	+/–
1998	3.2 (#6)	2 / 855	▲2
