= Polish Reason of State =

Polish Reason of State Polska Racja Stanu
- Abbreviation: PSR
- Leader: Zenon Tyma (2003-2004); Zbigniew Witaszek (2004-2005)
- Founded: 6 September 2003
- Registered: 15 November 2004
- Dissolved: 14 November 2005
- Split from: SRP
- Headquarters: ul. Włościańska 35A, Pawilon III A, 01-710 Warszawa
- Membership (2003): 6
- Ideology: Socialism; Agrarianism; Euroscepticism; Anti-Atlanticism
- Political position: Centre-left to left-wing
- Religion: Roman Catholic
- Colours: Red
- Sejm: 0 / 460
- Senate: 0 / 100
- European Parliament: 0 / 51
- Regional assemblies: 0 / 552
- City presidents: 0 / 117

Polish Reason of State (Polish: Polska Racja Stanu, PSR) was a minor Polish political party that was active between 2003 and 2005, with a parliamentary circle in the 4th Sejm that functioned between 2003 and 2004. Founded in September 2003 by former members of the Self-Defence of the Republic of Poland (Polish: Samoobrona Rzeczpospolitej Polskiej, SRP), the party was registered in late 2004 and was composed of four Samoobrona MPs that were expelled from the party on 23 July 2003. It was later joined by two former Samoobrona members that left the party prior to 2003.

The party pledged to continue the political program and platform of Samoobrona, which it accused of going against its own proposals and ideology. Polish Reason of State presented itself as a trustworthy and accountable alternative to Samoobrona, and required its members to have political experience. It sought to form a coalition with any of the major parties willing to take an agrarian and regulatory approach to economy. After failing to find a political partner, Polish Reason of State entered talks with agrarian Polish Peasant Bloc, a fellow Samoobrona split. Ultimately the party dissolved in 2005, less than one year after its registration in 2004. Its members then joined the left-wing Self-Defence Social Movement in 2006, another split from Samoobrona.

== History ==
On 23 July 2003, the leader of an agrarian socialist party Self-Defence of the Republic of Poland, expelled 4 MPs from the party - Zbigniew Witaszek, Stanisław Dulias, Zenon Tyma and Zdzisław Jankowski. Expelled MPs were accused of "acting to the detriment of the party, disseminating false information and failing to comply with the party rules".

About a month after their expulsion, the 4 MPs gathered in Opole on 6 September 2003, where they announced the formation of a new party - Polish Reason of State. Founding members argued that their expulsion was unjustified and was caused by their criticism of Samoobrona, which they accused of failing to realise its political program and going against its own ideology. The party was soon joined by Zbigniew Nowak and Jerzy Pękała, two politicians that left Samoobrona in 2002. Zenon Tyma was elected the leader of the new party, and its members started collecting the needed 1000 signatures in order to register the party.

The party's identity was shaped by Stanisław Dulias, who was very close to the left-wing circles; the PRS declaration drew attention to the postulate of economic involvement of the state, reintroduction of socialist economy, and opposition to Poland's participation in NATO and 'western' wars. The party published an open letter to Andrzej Lepper which formulated a number of accusations against the leadership of Samoobrona, including those concerning ambiguities around the management of organisational funds. In it, PSR also highlighted flaws in the party's management and questioned the transparency of how funds contributed to the party by parliamentarians were allocated. In response, Lepper firmly declared that past merits for Samoobrona could not constitute a title to hold power in the party, noting the importance of new members and supporters of the group; he also stressed that those who left the ranks of the parliamentary club would not have the opportunity to run on the party's electoral lists in the future.

The party was eventually registered on 15 November 2004, over a year after its foundation. In January 2004, the party entered talks with politicians Roman Jagieliński and Tomasz Mamiński to form the left-wing Federated Parliamentary Club. The club consisted of social-democratic People's Democratic Party (Polish: Partia Ludowo-Demokratyczna), democratic socialist National Party of Retirees and Pensioners and Polish Reason of State, and also included former members of Polish People's Party and Democratic Left Alliance.

However, most of the club's members left it within a short time of signing the agreement. The club was soon reduced to People's Democratic Party and Polish Reason of State. Jerzy Pękała and Zbigniew Witaszek were elected the co-leaders of the reduced formation. Witaszek then entered the parliamentary club of social-democratic Household Party (Polish: Stronnictwo Gospodarcze), but did not seek to contest the 2004 European Parliament election in Poland. The party started seeking a coalition with major parties in the Sejm, with its member stating that they were open to entering a coalition with anyone, as long as agrarian interests and introducing new regulations on Polish economy. were to be prioritized.

Later in 2004, the leader of the party, Zenon Tyma, became a member of the far-right League of Polish Families. In his name, Zbigniew Witaszek was elected as the new leader of Polish Reason of State. After becoming the party leader, Witaszek entered talks with Polish Peasant Bloc, an agrarian party that split from Samoobrona and Polish People's Party in 2002. Witaszek envisioned merging two parties together and stated that the new formation would be based on left-wing agrarianism and opposition to the European Union. However, the talks did not succeed. In the 2005 Polish parliamentary election, Zbigniew Witaszek and Stanisław Dulias sought re-election as independent candidates on the electoral list of Polish People's Party. However, they did not keep their seats. The party was dissolved soon after the election, on 14 November 2005. Zbigniew Witaszek would play a leading role in a 2006 left-wing split from Samoobrona, Self-Defence Social Movement.

== Leadership ==
Party authorities were elected on 6 September 2003:

- Chairman - Zenon Tyma;
- Secretary - Stanisław Dulias;
- Vice-chairman - Zdzisław Jankowski;
- Vice-chairman - Zbigniew Witaszek.

In 2004, Zenon Tyma left the party and joined League of Polish Families instead. Zbigniew Witaszek was elected as the next chairman of the party. Zbigniew Nowak became the second vice-chairman, a position previously occupied by Witaszek.

== Ideology ==
Polish Reason of State pledged to continue the political program of Samoobrona, the party it split off from. The PSR accused Samoobrona of abandoning its program as well as ideology. In the ideological declaration of the party, it was stated that "the party has to be clear and straightforward, because only such can overcome difficulties and problems". Its main goal was to "win the public's trust"; other parties were denounced as self-serving instead of serving the people, a situation that the PSR called "pathological".

Ideologically, the party was described as left-wing. Political scientist Mateusz Piskorski notes that members of the party were close to left-wing political circles, including Samoobrona itself. The ideological declaration of the party was mainly composed of calls for the nationalization of industries and socialization of the Polish economy, which was consistent with the far-left program of the members' original party as well. Of particular importance to PSR was also opposition of Polish membership in NATO and its involvement in what the party termed 'Western' wars, such as the Iraq War.

The party had rigorous membership requirements, and announced that its members are required to have at least 6 months of experience in politics. The party wanted to present an alternative to both Samoobrona as well as social-democratic Democratic Left Alliance (SLD), asserting that many voters are disaffected with the state of Polish left-wing political parties.

According to its later party leader, Zbigniew Witaszek, PSR was ready to enter a coalition with any "honest, decent and unadulterated" party, as long as it promised to prioritize agrarian interests and take a regulatory, non-liberal approach to Polish economy. The aim of the party was to "repair" the 1989 economic transformation of Polish economy, which the party blamed for causing injustice and poverty. This mirrored the rhetoric of Samoobrona, which popularized a slogan "Balcerowicz must go" in order to protest introduction of capitalist system in Poland initiated by the Balcerowicz Plan.

Pledging to repair the 'injustice' done in 1989, Polish Reason of State described itself as a socialist party, much in line with original Samoobrona and its ideology. However, the party also praised 'Catholic ethic' and wanted it to remain a guiding force of Polish society. The party was also Eurosceptical and opposed to the European Union; the party wanted to enter the European Parliament despite its anti-EU position. Along with socialism and Euroscepticism, the PSR put agrarianism and rural interests on the forefront of its ideology, and actively sought alliances with other agrarian parties; ultimately the party members joined another agrarian-oriented split from Samoobrona - Self-Defence Social Movement.

== See also ==
- Self-Defence Social Movement
- Self-Defence of the Republic of Poland
- Self-Defence Rebirth
- Self-Defence of the Polish Nation
- Patriotic Self-Defence
- League of Polish Families
- Andrzej Lepper
- Party of Regions (Poland)
