= Polish Peasant Bloc =

Polish Peasant Bloc Polski Blok Ludowy (Polish)
- Abbreviation: PBL
- Leader: Wojciech Mojzesowicz
- Founded: 4 June 2003
- Dissolved: 22 November 2004
- Split from: SRP
- Merged into: PiS
- Headquarters: ul. Odkryta 51f/16, 03-140 Warsaw
- Ideology: National agrarianism
- Political position: Centre
- Colours: Red; White
- Sejm: 0 / 460
- Senate: 0 / 100
- European Parliament: 0 / 51
- Regional assemblies: 0 / 552
- City presidents: 0 / 117

Website
- pbl.pl

The Polish Peasant Bloc (Polish: Polski Blok Ludowy, PBL) was a short-lived political party in Poland, founded in 2003 by members of the parliamentary circle of the same name, which was established in December 2002. It was dissolved in 2004, however the parliamentary circle existed until January 2005. It claimed to follow patriotic-peasant-democratic values. The chairman of the grouping was Wojciech Mojzesowicz. In 2014 PBL was reactivated as an informal grouping, and Wacław Klukowski became its president.

== History ==
The party as well as the parliamentary circle associated with it was formed by Wojciech Mojzesowicz and his associated. Mojzesowicz was an agrarian politician who first started his career in 1989, when he won a seat in the Sejm in the 1989 Polish parliamentary election as member of the agrarian socialist United People's Party. He then joined the agrarian Polish People's Party and became a leader of the party's regional branch in Bydgoszcz, but soon left the party to join Self-Defence of the Republic of Poland in 1999, a party and a trade union founded by Andrzej Lepper, who was Mojzesowicz's classmate in vocational school.

Samoobrona emerged in 1992 as a radical rural trade union movement that led militant nationwide strikes and protests. It then quickly became known for its radical tactics, with clashes with the police becoming common for Samoobrona-led protests. Samoobrona soon got involved in politics, becoming a national left−wing agrarian party, gaining popularity through its attacks on Leszek Balcerowicz, the economic minister who introduced capitalism and market economy to Poland through his neoliberal Balcerowicz Plan. Promoting slogans such as "Balcerowicz must go!", Samoobrona acted as an outspoken defender of the poor and disadvantaged, accusing the Polish government of impoverishing many for the benefit of the few through dissolution of socialism and implementation of capitalism.

Upon establishing itself as a political party, Samoobrona became a party with an agrarian populist and a Catholic socialist identity. It was described as far-left, and was based on radical conception of the economic class, aiming to represent the poor and disadvantaged classes at large. Initially, Samoobrona was an agrarian trade union that rocked the 1990s political scene of Poland with its radical protest methods and anti-capitalist demands. In what it called the "star march", Samoobrona would block main roads of the cities with agricultural vehicles; the situation eventually escalated into open clashes with riot police, as the farmers represented by Samoobrona attempted to storm government buildings. Starting in 1992, the party founded "Peasant Battalions" (Polish: Bataliony Chłopskie), referring to a Polish agrarian WW2-era resistance movement of the same name, which was a paramilitary subdisivion of Samoobrona organized to protect farmers against evictions and bailiffs. The "Peasant Battalions" of Samoobrona harassed public officials, reportedly shaving their heads or robbing them. In regards to the battalions and the goal of the party itself, Lepper stated: "We will strengthen physical fortitude, develop patriotism and train our military troops. We don't want war, but we have a lawless state, so we will fight the state offices - bailiffs, banks, tax offices - with weapons in hand. We are a radical party, open to all disadvantaged people who are starving at home."

Samoobrona gained tremendous popularity after a nationwide blockade of agricultural import the European Union was cancelled by the Rural Solidarity, the main agrarian union of Poland, which refused to work with Samoobrona on the basis of their "communist" ideology and "terrorist" behaviour. Polish farmers frustrated with the inability of their trade unions to cooperate flocked to Samoobrona, and the party itself moved to conventional politics, gradually extending its appeal beyond farmers to a broad socioeconomic message. Samoobrona became associated less with farmers and was described instead as increasingly a "party of working people, of the impoverished, exploited, and wronged". Between 1992 and 1993, it was Samoobrona that organized half of all rural protests in Poland, and is considered an important radicalization factor amongst the Polish countryside, especially given the willingness of Samoobrona to assault police offers and debt collectors. By 1999, while most agrarian trade unions reversed their stance towards Samoobrona and now backed it despite its "neo-communist" ideology, the party was now strong enough to act on its own, and became more popular in the countryside than the Polish People's Party, the traditional agrarian party.

Samoobrona participated in the 2000 Polish presidential election, nominating Andrzej Lepper as its candidate. During the presidential campaign, Lepper confirmed the direction of the party by arguing that socialism should br restored in Poland as it had "not yet reached full maturity". In 2000, the percentage of Poles declaring their dissatisfaction with the political situation rose to 50%, up from 30% in 1999. Samoobrona tried to utilize this by positioning itself as an anti-establishment party, and continuing its rhetoric as the "defender of the oppressed" and the party of "all weak, poor, and unemployed". However, the main priority of the party became extending its popularity amongst the rural electorate, thus becoming the main opponent of the Polish People's Party. While ultimately Lepper only won 3% of the popular vote in the election, Samoobrona was able to extend its appeal and build a support base ahead of the 2001 election. Ongoing farmer protests between 2000 and 2001 popularized slogans such as "Tomorrow will be Lepper", and after the 2000 election, 17% of voters polled believed that Lepper should have received more votes. Lepper also courted trade unions, attending pickets of the All-Poland Alliance of Trade Unions and speaking of his concept of the "workers' and peasants' alliance" that he wanted to materialize through Samoobrona.

The 2000 election also sparked the exodus of some Polish People's Party activists to Samoobrona, which was escalated by Samoobrona's pledge that defectors will be considered for prominent positions in the party ranks. The defectors from Polish People's Party included Wojciech Mojzesowicz, who left PSL and joined Samoobrona after he lost the elections for the chairmanships of the PSL's regional Bygdoszcz structures. After joining Samoobrona, Mojzesowicz became seen as the opposite of Andrzej Lepper, in spite of their childhood friendship. Mojzesowicz says to have seen Samoobrona as a laborist, radical party with a "nationalist tint", but claims that the party lost its agrarian nature after the 2001 Polish parliamentary election. Feeling powerless to manage the political direction of the party, Mojzesowicz left Samoobrona in 2003 as one of its MPs, and initially considered joining the Polish People's Party.

The Polish People's Block was formed as a result of the withdrawal of Self-Defence of the Republic of Poland MP Wojciech Mojzesowicz and a small group of MPs associated with him. Members of the circle formed on 6 December 2002 became Wacław Klukowski, Dorota Kwaśniewska, Wojciech Mojzesowicz and Lech Zielonka. In March 2003, they were joined by Bożena Kozłowska and in July of the same year by Piotr Smolana. The party was reported to the register of political parties on 4 June 2003, and registered on 23 July of the same year.

After the coalition of social-democratic Democratic Left Alliance (SLD) and Polish People's Party was dissolved on 3 March 2003 following disputes over agrarian tariffs and farmers' protests, the SLD began looking for a new coalition partner. The first considered partner was the People's Democratic Party (Polish: Partia Ludowo-Demokratyczna) of Roman Jagieliński, another Samoobrona defector. Jagieliński already served as the minister of agriculture between 1995 and 1997, and was therefore considered an experienced and well-respected candidate. Jagieliński started talks with the Polish Peasant Bloc as well, hoping that the PBL would also enter a coalition with the SLD. Samoobrona itself ruled out joining a coalition, but stated that it would be open to renewing its supply and confidence agreement depending on SLD's coalition partner. However, ultimately SLD formed a minority government with the pro-European Labour Union.

In June 2003, the new minority government faced a vote of confidence. The ruling coalition gathered 224 votes by mid-June, as it could count on the support of the People's Democratic Party and the German Minority Electoral Committee. On behalf of the Polish Peasant Bloc, Mojzesowicz declared that he would support the new government (bringing the vote up to 229), if SLD dismissed its minister of agriculture Adam Tański. Mojzesowicz criticized Tański's policies, accusing him of selling Polish grain for low prices to foreign capital. The minority SLD-UP government managed to pass the vote of confidence by 236 votes (out of 231), thanks to the support of Samoobrona. In case of the Polish Peasant Bloc, 4 out of the 5 MPs of PBL voted for the government, while Mojzesowicz himself voted against it, as Tański was not dismissed.

In 2004 the PBL supported Marek Belka's candidacy as Prime Minister. In January 2004, the Polish People's Bloc Parliamentary Club agreed to merge with the Polish People's Party (PSL)., resulting in the formation of the joint PSL-PBL Parliamentary Club in March, which, however, existed only until April, when the Polish People's Bloc withdrew from this coalition. In the 2004 European Parliament election in Poland, PBL came to an agreement with League of Polish Families (LPR), as a result of which Wacław Klukowski (Polish Peasant Bloc's MEP from 1 May to 19 July 2004, not belonging to any European faction), was on the LPR list in the Gorzów district, but he did not obtain a seat. In May, Lech Zielonka joined the Federated Parliamentary Club, and in June the circle was also abandoned by Bożena Kozłowska and Dorota Kwaśniewska, as a result of which its size decreased to 3 MPs. On 22 November of the same year, the party was deregistered, and in January 2005 the Polish Peasant Bloc also ceased to exist as a parliamentary circle. Most of the party's activists then joined Law and Justice (PiS). Mojzesowicz became a prominent MP in Law and Justice, and was one of the main authors of the party's agrarian program.

In March 2014, the Polish People's Bloc was reactivated as an informal grouping. This followed the departure of activists from this milieu from Poland Together (previously, after leaving PiS in 2009, they had worked with Civic Platform and in 2010 co-founded Poland Comes First, which after dissolution in 2013 co-foundedPoland Together; Wojciech Mojzesowicz was vice-president of Poland Comes First and treasurer of Poland Together). The president of the reactivated Polish Peasant Bloc became Wacław Klukowski. On 15 March, the grouping reached an agreement with Sovereign Poland ahead of the 2014 European Parliament election in Poland. Wacław Klukowski ran for the Sejm in 2015 from the New Hope list, in 2018 he co-founded the Peasants' Party (which entered into an alliance with the Democratic Left Alliance), and later became an activist of the informal Farmers' Confederation (Polish: Konfederacja Rolniczo-Konsumencka, KRK), established in 2019, which by 2021 was part of the Confederation Liberty and Independence (with which Wojciech Mojzesowicz, who is vice-president of the Farmers' Confederation, had previously been associated).

== Ideology ==
According to the party, the main reason behind leaving Samoobrona and creating a separate political structure was the perceived failure of Samoobrona to stay loyal and consistently realize its own political program, which the Polish Peasant Bloc supported in principle. The Polish Peasant Bloc also argued that Samoobrona lacks internal democracy, and that the party works on the basis of "one-man rule", with Andrzej Lepper having allegedly absolute power. Despite stating its intention to realize the program of Samoobrona, the party greatly different from it in that the Polish Peasant Bloc described itself as neither left-wing nor right-wing, but rather broadly agrarian. This was in great contrast to the far-left and socialist nature of Samoobrona. The Polish Peasant Bloc aspired to create a united agrarian bloc in Poland.

The party adhered a Christian democratic ideology, in line with the tradition of the interwar chadecja movement. The Polish Peasant Bloc believed that the 1980s and 1990s agrarian protests and their legacy were being forgotten in Poland, and it wished to represent them and carry out the proposals of the main agrarian movements from that period. The party had ambiguous stance towards socialism, but it argued that neither Poland nor the Polish agrarian movement should reject its socialist legacy. The leader of the party, Wojciech Mojzesowicz, argued that the label of socialism should not be a shameful one.

== See also ==
- AGROunia
- League and Self-Defense
- Party of Regions
- Patriotic Self-Defence
- Peasants' Party
- Self-Defence Rebirth
- Self-Defence Social Movement
- Self-Defence of the Polish Nation
