= 1998 Polish local elections =

1998 Polish regional assembly election
- 11 October 1998

855 seats to regional assemblies
- Registered: 28,546,385
- Turnout: 12,946,445 (45.35%) ▲11.57pp
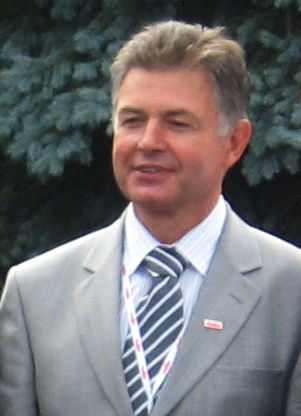

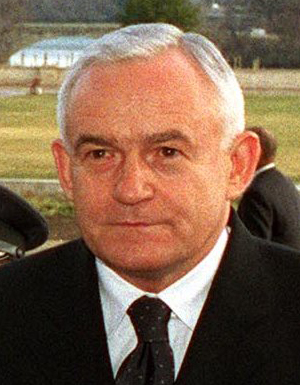

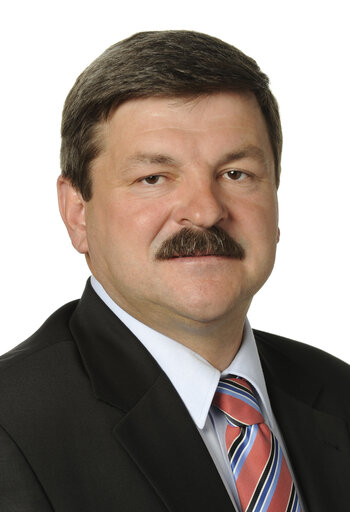

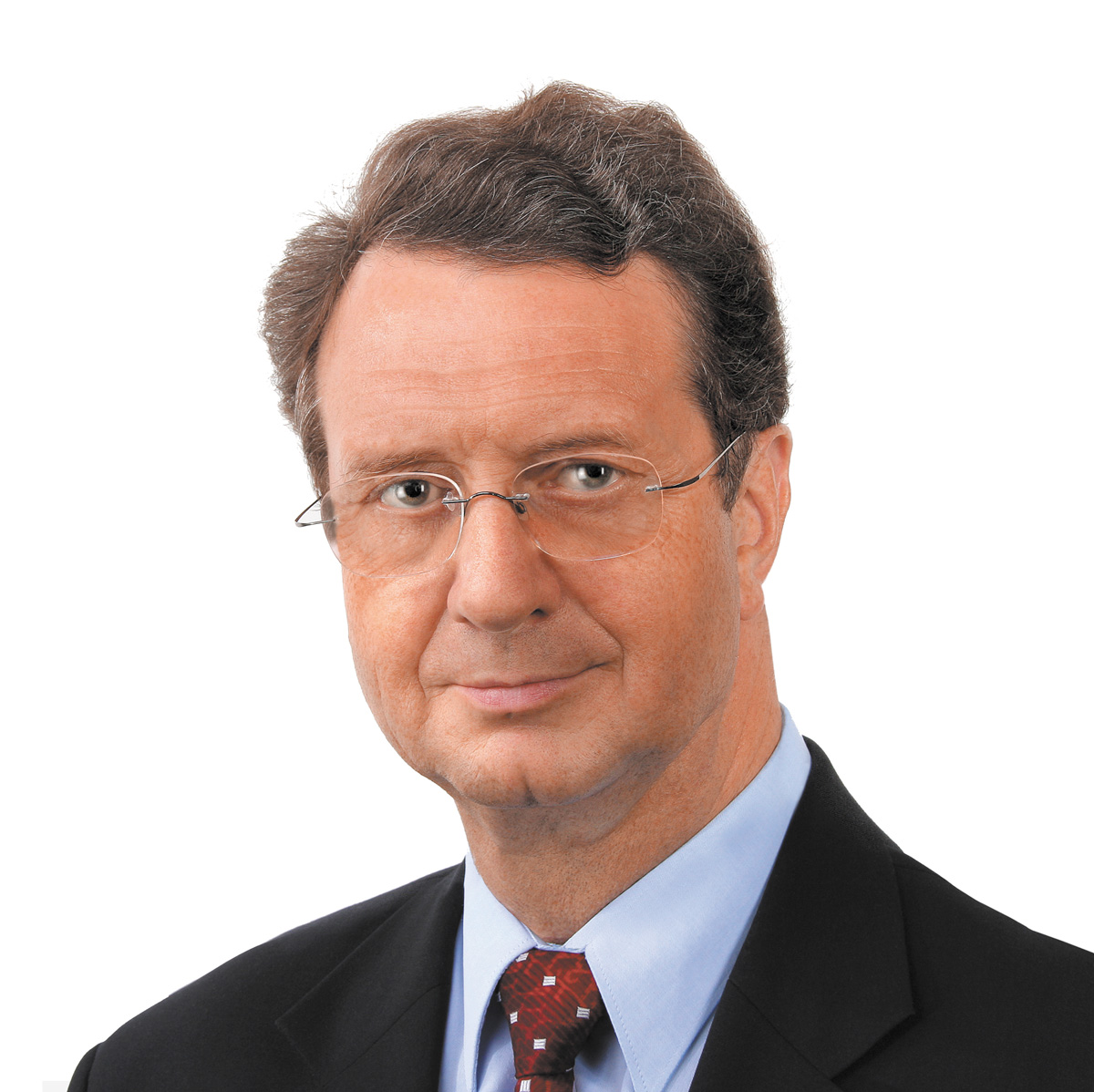

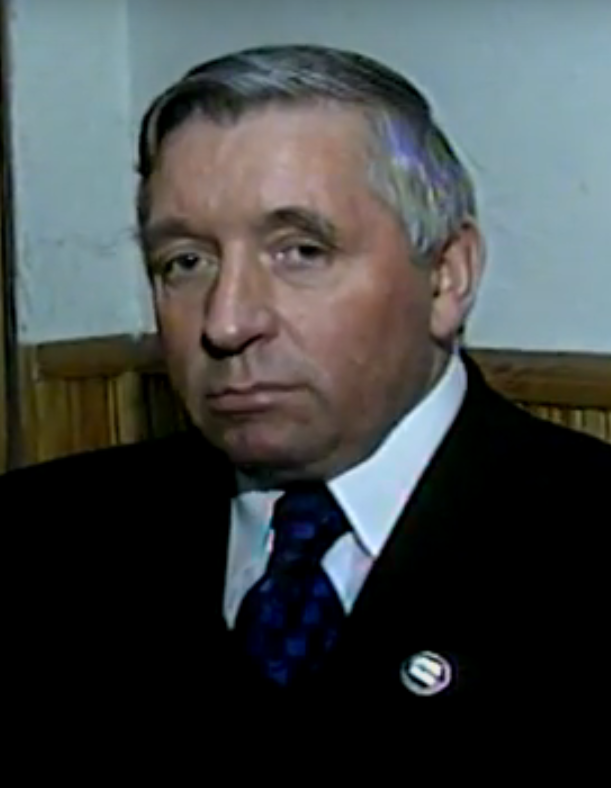

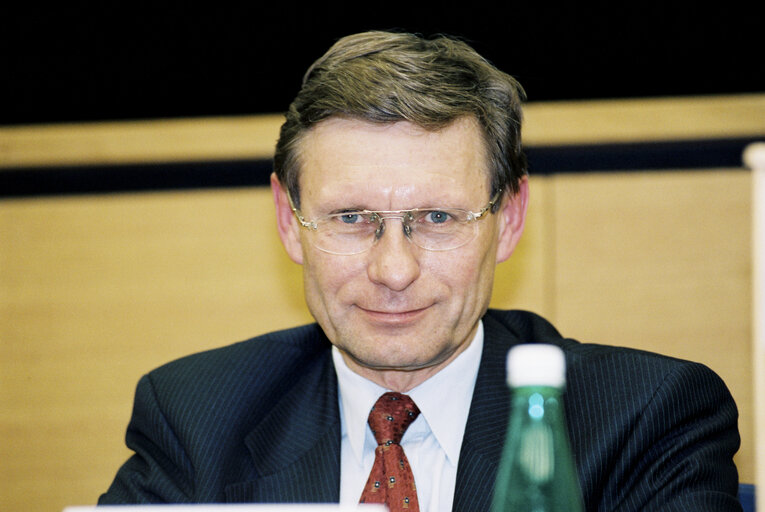

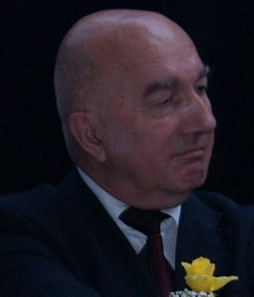

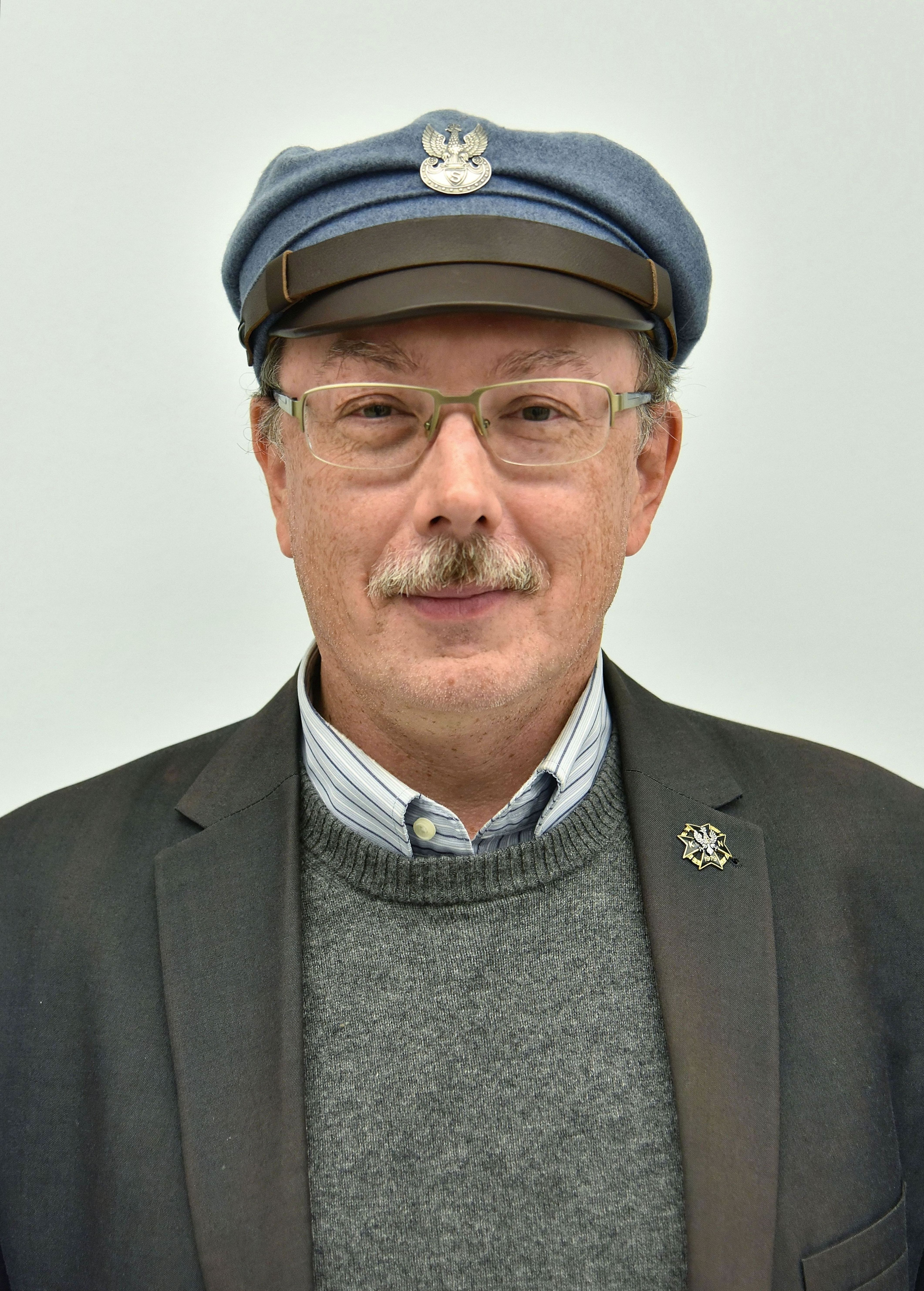
| | First party | Second party | Third party |
|---|---|---|---|
| Leader | Marian Krzaklewski | Leszek Miller | Jarosław Kalinowski; Marek Pol; Tomasz Mamiński; Andrzej Lepper |
| Party | AWS | SLD | PS |
| Seats won | 342 | 329 | 89 |
| Popular vote | 3,905,383 | 3,731,303 | 1,410,835 |
| Percentage | 33.3% | 31.8% | 12.0% |
| | Fourth party | Fifth party | Sixth party |
| Leader | Leszek Balcerowicz | Henryk Kroll | Adam Słomka |
| Party | UW | KWMN | RP"O" |
| Seats won | 76 | 13 | 2 |
| Popular vote | 1,369,241 | 67,921 | 376,317 |
| Percentage | 11.7% | 0.6% | 3.2% |
- Largest party and the distribution of seats in each voivodeship sejmik constituency.

Coalition formed in each voivodeship sejmik.

The 1998 Polish local elections were held on October 11, 1998. The number of valid votes cast was 11,721,825, with 12,945,043 casting ballots out of 28,544,777 eligible voters. The turnout in the elections to the provincial assemblies was 45.35%, and the proportion of invalid votes cast was 9.06%.

== History ==
The introduction of two new levels of local government (powiats and voivodeships) gave the 1998 local government elections a different character from those held four years earlier. A consequence of the changes was also the adoption of a new electoral law on 16 July 1998.

The parties and political associations belonging to the social-democratic Democratic Left Alliance (SLD) signed the "Local Government '98" (Polish: Samorządy’98) agreement on 16 June 1998, pledging to field joint candidates for municipal, district and provincial councils. The SLD's main election slogan was ‘Wise, Healthy, Safe’ (Polish: Mądrze, Zdrowo, Bezpiecznie).

However, the progressive Labour Union and the agrarian Polish People's Party resigned from taking part in the elections themselves - on 27 June, these two parties, together with the National Party of Retirees and Pensioners and far-left populist Self-Defence of the Republic of Poland formed a coalition under the name Social Alliance (PS). The party leaders believed that the formation of the coalition was necessary because the electoral law that was being prepared clearly favoured the large groupings (i.e. SLD and AWS), and one of the PS's main goals was to oppose the division of the political scene into post-communist and post-Solidarity groupings, and to establish a left-wing alternative for those who did not want to cast their votes for either the AWS or SLD. The agreement only concerned elections at the provincial level, but the local branches of the respective parties were advised to form similar alliances at the county and municipal levels. The Alliance ran in the elections under the slogan ‘Together we can do it’.

The vote, held on 11 October 1998, was more popular than four years earlier - 45.45 per cent of eligible voters took part in the municipal council elections, 47.76 per cent in the county council elections and 45.35 per cent in the provincial assembly elections. In presenting the political aspect of the election result, it is worth noting the polarisation on the political scene and the progressive partisanship of local authorities with the next level. In the elections to the regional assemblies, SLD won in nine voivodeships, AWS won in five and there was a tie in one (Silesian Voivodeship). However, it was the Solidarity Electoral Action that won more seats at this level (40 per cent), against 38.5 per cent won by the Alliance. The third force was the Social Alliance, which won 10.4 per cent of seats in the assemblies.

At the county and municipal level, local committees emerged to a much greater extent than at the provincial level, taking 25 per cent of the seats in the counties and 68 per cent in the municipalities respectively. The SLD won 27.7 per cent of the seats in the district council elections, the Alliance 13 per cent (in comparison: AWS - 30.4 per cent). The distribution of seats at the level of municipalities up to 20,000 inhabitants was as follows: Social Alliance - 6.9 per cent, SLD - 5.3 per cent, AWS - 9 per cent. Adding up the figures for the whole country and for councils at all levels, SLD had 8,837 seats, PS - 4,584 and AWS - 10,615 and UW - 1,146.

In the post-election governing coalitions formed at the provincial level, cooperation between the SLD and the Social Alliance was most common - this was the case in nine provinces, and in one (Warmińsko-Mazurskie) there was cooperation between the PS and AWS. At the district level, the formation of majority coalitions also depended in many cases on the position of the Social Alliance. Particularly important in this context was the PS leaders' adoption of the principle of not making top-down recommendations on who to enter into coalitions with. It is worth mentioning the then rather exotic AWS-SLD coalition that was concluded in Racibórz, which met with a very critical reception from the AWS leaders and a rather neutral attitude from the PS politicians.

In assessing the outcome of the individual groupings, there was the very good result of the SLD, which, after its defeat in the 1997 parliamentary elections, slowly began to narrow the gap with the Solidarity Electoral Action, dominant on the political scene at the time. The 1998 elections also played an important role in the SLD's transformation from a broad electoral coalition into a centralised political party.

There are two elements which contribute to the assessment of the Social Alliance's success: on the one hand, it became the third political force in the country, and - due to the balance of power in the local governments and councils - an important subject of the coalition negotiations conducted by AWS or SLD; on the other hand, the main beneficiary of the PS's success was the Polish People's Party (PSL), which took over the vast majority of the seats it won. This was related to the fact that Labour Union's candidates dominated the lists in municipal districts where the Social Alliance did not enjoy particular support. This was the case, for example, in Warsaw, where some 600 candidates were fielded for councils at various levels and not a single seat was won. The only seats won (in the Mazovian assembly) went to the PSL.

UP's small gains were also the result of the weakness of many of the territorial structures of both parties. This is why, despite the announcement that the Social Alliance would be maintained, there were voices in the Labour Union after the elections that were critical of the establishment of cooperation with the Polish People's Party. The Labour Union's youth, among others, considered it a big mistake to continue to remain in this coalition. The consequence of such opinions was the establishment of cooperation with the Democratic Left Alliance (SLD).

Apart from the PSL, the radical agrarian Self-Defence of the Republic of Poland also greatly benefited from its participation in PS, giving it nationwide recognition and allowing it to emerge as the third largest party in the 2001 Polish parliamentary election. Self-Defence presented itself as the "party of working people, of the impoverished, exploited, and wronged". Formed out of the dissidents wings of the Polish United Workers' Party such as the national communists and Maoists, Samoobrona established itself as an anti-establishment and a left-wing populist party. Shortly after the 1998 elections, Samoobrona started cooperating with the Polish Socialist Party of Piotr Ikonowicz, and both parties considered forming a coalition known as the "Workers' and Peasants' Alliance". Self-Defence also gained support of SLD party ranks, and the party attracted a sizable group of left-wing activists, both at the central and local level.

== Voivodeship councils ==
=== Seats distribution ===
| Voivodeship Council | | | | | | | | | |
| Voivodeship Council | AWS | SLD | PS | UW | MN | WŚ | RP"O" | RP | Total |
|---|---|---|---|---|---|---|---|---|---|
| Lower Silesia | 19 | 25 | 2 | 9 | — | — | — | — | 55 |
| Kuyavia-Pomerania | 15 | 26 | 5 | 4 | — | — | — | — | 50 |
| Lublin | 20 | 16 | 12 | 2 | — | — | — | — | 50 |
| Lubusz | 14 | 22 | 3 | 6 | — | — | — | — | 45 |
| Łódź | 19 | 24 | 9 | 3 | — | — | — | — | 55 |
| Lesser Poland | 38 | 13 | 3 | 6 | — | — | — | — | 60 |
| Masovia | 32 | 30 | 11 | 6 | — | — | — | 1 | 80 |
| Opole | 11 | 14 | 3 | 4 | 13 | — | — | — | 45 |
| Subcarpathian | 31 | 10 | 8 | — | — | — | 1 | — | 50 |
| Podlaskie | 25 | 13 | 5 | 2 | — | — | — | — | 45 |
| Pomerania | 27 | 16 | 2 | 5 | — | — | — | — | 50 |
| Silesia | 31 | 31 | 1 | 12 | — | — | — | — | 75 |
| Świętokrzyskie | 10 | 21 | 11 | — | — | 3 | — | — | 45 |
| Warmia-Masuria | 16 | 17 | 6 | 6 | — | — | — | — | 45 |
| Greater Poland | 21 | 29 | 5 | 5 | — | — | — | — | 60 |
| West Pomerania | 13 | 22 | 3 | 6 | — | — | 1 | — | 45 |
| Poland | 342 | 329 | 89 | 76 | 13 | 3 | 2 | 1 | 855 |

| Party | Votes | % | Seats |
|---|---|---|---|
| Solidarity Electoral Action | 3,905,383 | 33.31 | 342 |
| Democratic Left Alliance | 3,731,303 | 31.83 | 329 |
| Social Alliance | 1,410,835 | 12.03 | 89 |
| Freedom Union | 1,369,241 | 11.68 | 76 |
| Polish Family Association | 606,237 | 5.17 | 1 |
| Homeland Patriotic Movement | 376,317 | 3.21 | 2 |
| German Minority in Opole | 67,921 | 0.58 | 13 |
| Real Politics Union | 44,838 | 0.38 | 0 |
| "Wspólnota Świętokrzyska" Association | 41,871 | 0.36 | 3 |
| Silesian Autonomy Movement | 30,819 | 0.26 | 0 |
| "Christian Democracy" Electoral Committee | 22,411 | 0.19 | 0 |
| Christian Democracy of the Third Polish Republic | 11,800 | 0.10 | 0 |
| Affranchisement Association | 11,752 | 0.10 | 0 |
| Committee for Defence of Opole | 11,533 | 0.10 | 0 |
| Szczecin League | 10,804 | 0.09 | 0 |
| Ecological Association of Wrocław | 6,329 | 0.05 | 0 |
| Independent Electoral Forum "Helping Families" | 4,577 | 0.04 | 0 |
| Warsaw Economic Council Agreement | 4,395 | 0.04 | 0 |
| Labor Defence - CONSULTRIX | 4,359 | 0.04 | 0 |
| Polish Anglers' Union | 3,814 | 0.03 | 0 |
| Polytechnic Electoral Committee | 3,661 | 0.03 | 0 |
| Polish Society of War Veterans | 3,578 | 0.03 | 0 |
| Agreement for Górnik Zabrze | 3,276 | 0.03 | 0 |
| Citizen's Self-Governance | 3,013 | 0.03 | 0 |
| Forward Silesia | 2,863 | 0.02 | 0 |
| Education Electoral Committee | 2,728 | 0.02 | 0 |
| Agreement for Zabory Lands 2010 | 2,716 | 0.02 | 0 |
| Handicapped People's Electoral Committee | 2,684 | 0.02 | 0 |
| Independent Self-Governance Initiative Starachowice - "Common Cause" | 2,513 | 0.02 | 0 |
| Citizen's and Interparochial Self-Governance | 2,461 | 0.02 | 0 |
| Economic Entities Association | 2,181 | 0.02 | 0 |
| Lublin Cooperatives - Self-Governance | 1,925 | 0.02 | 0 |
| Krosno Economic Forum | 1,914 | 0.02 | 0 |
| Dębiany Individual Nonpartisan Farmers' Electoral Committee | 1,861 | 0.02 | 0 |
| Zabrze Residents' Citizen's Defence Movement | 1,759 | 0.02 | 0 |
| "Our Kielce" - Committee for Support of Local Self-Governance | 1,663 | 0.01 | 0 |
| Independents for the Handicapped and Pensioners | 1,309 | 0.01 | 0 |
| Democratic People's Party | 936 | 0.01 | 0 |
| Christian Forum | 908 | 0.01 | 0 |
| Przedwiośnie-Independents Electoral Committee | 860 | 0.01 | 0 |
| Regional Cattle Dairy Farmers' Union | 622 | 0.01 | 0 |
| Association of Self-Growth Activism | 450 | 0.00 | 0 |
| Our Youth Electoral Committee | 426 | 0.00 | 0 |
| Polish National Community | 361 | 0.00 | 0 |
| Total | 11,723,207 | 100.00 | 855 |
| Valid votes | 11,723,207 | 90.55 | |
| Invalid/blank votes | 1,223,238 | 9.45 | |
| Total votes | 12,946,445 | 100.00 | |
| Registered voters/turnout | 28,546,385 | 45.35 | |
Source: National Electoral Commission
