= Social Alliance (Poland) =

Social Alliance Przymierze Społeczne
- Abbreviation: PS
- Leaders: Jarosław Kalinowski; Marek Pol; Tomasz Mamiński; Andrzej Lepper
- Founded: 27 June 1998
- Dissolved: 23 September 2001
- Headquarters: Słupsk, Poland
- Membership (1998): 65,000
- Ideology: Anti-austerity; Anti-neoliberalism; Agrarian socialism; Social democracy
- Political position: Left-wing
- Members: Polish People's Party; Labour Union; KPEiR; Samoobrona; Alliance of Democrats
- Allies: Democratic Left Alliance; Polish Socialist Party; Solidarność '80
- Colors: Navy blue Green
- Slogan: Together we can do it (Polish: Razem damy radę); Balcerowicz－dud of the year (Polish: Balcerowicz－bubel roku)

The Social Alliance was an electoral coalition created for the 1998 Polish local elections. Formed on 27 June 1998, the Social Alliance included the Polish People's Party along with its smaller left-oriented party partners, such as the Labour Union, the National Party of Retirees and Pensioners, the Self-Defence of the Republic of Poland and few members of Alliance of Democrats (Poland). The party represented the "independent left" that challenged the anti-communist and pro-communist dichotomy of Polish politics while maintaining a strongly leftist profile inspired by pre-WW2 socialist and agrarian movements. It protested against the capitalist reforms carried out in Poland such as austerity, criticizing them for creating massive wealth inequality. Nevertheless, the coalition cooperated with the post-communist Democratic Left Alliance as well as the Polish Socialist Party.

Despite ideological disputes between coalition members, in particular between the Eurosceptic Samoobrona and the pro-EU Labour Union, as well as funding gap, the Social Alliance was well-received and achieved a good result. With its anti-capitalist program, the coalition obtained 89 seats in provincial voivodeship sejmiks (12,04%) and 4,583 powiat and gmina councillor seats. Despite its success, the coalition was short-lived and was dissolved on the day of the 2001 Polish parliamentary election. Nevertheless, the coalition is credited with successfully challenging the dichotomy of 1990s Polish politics, and became an inspiration for similar coalition concepts, such as the "Workers' and Peasants' Alliance" between Polish Socialist Party and Samoobrona, or an 'All-Agrarian Coalition' composed of Polish People's Party, Samoobrona and rural trade unions.

== History ==
=== The 1998 election ===
The coalition was officially formed on 27 June 1998, before the 1998 Polish local elections planned for the autumn. It consisted of the Polish People's Party (PSL), the Labour Union (UP), Self-Defence of the Republic of Poland (SPR) and the National Party of Retirees and Pensioners (KPEiR). Representatives of other formations, such as Alliance of Democrats, also ran on its lists. In its manifesto, Przymierze Społeczne declared: 'Nothing will change in Poland if we do not counter the successive varieties of post-Solidarity and post-communist liberalism with an alliance of working people.' Labour Union leader Marek Pol indicated that the coalition aimed to represent, among others, those impoverished by capitalist transformation. Media polls at the time gave the coalition 8% support.

Marek Pol argued that the formation of the coalition was necessary because the electoral law that was being prepared clearly favoured large groupings (i.e. the SLD and AWS), and according to Kalinowski of the PSL, one of the Social Alliance's main goals was to oppose the division of the political scene into post-Communist and post-Solidarity groupings and to establish an alternative for those who did not want to cast their votes for either the Democratic Left Alliance or the Solidarity Electoral Action. The agreement only concerned elections at the provincial level, but the local branches of the respective parties were advised to form similar alliances at the county and municipal levels. The coalition ran in the elections under the slogan "Together we can do it". The coalition members' conflicting stances on the European Union proved problematic for the party.

In a pre-election CBOS poll, every second PSL supporter and a third of UP supporters declared support for the coalition. Amongst the more exotic candidates of the coalition where those of Samoobrona as well as the trade union Solidarity '80. Andrzej Lepper, the leader of Samoobrona, claimed: "There are no programme differences between us". However, the vice-president of the PSL, Marek Sawicki, protested this statement and pointed to programmatic differences between PSL and Samoobrona, stating: "The support in the local elections of the Social Alliance candidates by the farmers' union Samoobrona does not imply the Eurosceptic views of the PSL." Marek Pol also distanced himself from Samoobrona and Lepper: "The Labour Union is aware of the controversial nature of the candidate. We discussed this during the last Social Alliancecouncil meeting. However, since his person was supported by the PSL, I understand that it takes full responsibility for the fact that Mr Lepper will implement the programme of the Social Alliance".

On the electoral lists of the Social Alliance, Samoobrona presented nearly 120 candidates, mostly for the West Pomeranian Voivodeship Sejmik. The radically populist and aggressive style of campaigning of Samoobrona, known for its at times violent agrarian protests and trade union strikes, provided a great contrast to the moderate, well-established Polish People's Party as well as the social-democratic, "civil" Labour Union. However, both parties defended the presence of Samoobrona and its leader Andrzej Lepper in the coalition, arguing that it is preferable "that the participants of the radical agricultural protests get on the road to democratic procedures as soon as possible. Admittedly, he [Lepper] will not be an easy partner, but it is better to discuss with him in the assembly than on a blocked roadway". Nevertheless, political magazine Polityka noted that Labour Union had been more supportive of agricultural protests as well as the economic proposals of the Polish People's Party and Samoobrona rather than its fellow social-democratic Democratic Left Alliance, thus acquiring a populist, agrarian image on its own.

According to 1998 statistics, 450,000 fewer votes were cast for the Social Alliance than in the 1997 Polish parliamentary election for the PSL, UP and the KPEiR combined. The press emphasised that it was mainly PSL that benefited from the coalition, while for the Labour Union, participation in the electoral bloc meant defeat. The coalition won a total of 4583 councillor seats out of a total of 63,765. It won 89 provincial assembly councillor seats out of a total of 855. The Alliance won seats in all sejmiks; these were won mainly by representatives of the PSL. Andrzej Lepper was elected to the regional assembly of Zachodniopomorskie Voivodeship from the PS list. In the assembly elections, the coalition came third behind AWS and SLD (and slightly ahead of UW) with a total of 12.04% of the vote. PS recorded the highest support, above 20%, in the Lubelskie and Świętokrzyskie voivodeships.

=== Aftermath ===
After the elections, the PS declared an equal distance from AWS and SLD, claiming that it would not decide top-down who would be its coalition partner in local government. However, in most assemblies the Alliance entered into a coalition with the SLD. The coalition established cooperation in nine provinces with the social-democratic SLD and in one province with the conservative AWS. The coalition, although it achieved moderate success, was criticised by PSL politicians from the national-radical wing. Disappointment was expressed by the Labour Union, which argued against deepening cooperation with the PSL.

Social Alliance was an unprecedented case of the PSL working together with much more radical Self-Defence, and there was speculation at the time about the possibility of a permanent alliance being formed on its basis, which in the long term could lead to the full unification of political structures representing Polish farmers and the rural population. However, this proposal failed as both parties started strongly competing with each other. In this situation, cooperation was limited to undertaking successive joint initiatives aimed at bringing together and working out common positions by the three largest agricultural trade unions; in June 1998, it was agreed that ZZR "Samoobrona" together with KZRKiOR and NSZZ "Solidarność" RI would work out a common position on the terms of Poland's accession to the European Union.

The coalition is credited with contributing to Samoobrona's rise to relevance in the 2001 Polish parliamentary election. Samoobrona was a radical far-left agrarian socialist and Catholic socialist force that became a refugee for dissident wings of Polish United Workers' Party, such as national communists and also Maoists, with Polish Maoist groups being supportive of the party. Shortly before the 2001 Polish parliamentary election, there emerged a project of a "Workers' and Peasants' Alliance" combining Samoobrona and the Polish Socialist Party of Piotr Ikonowicz. More significantly, Samoobrona then gained informal support from the SLD, keen to weaken the PSL, which allowed Samoobrona to play the role of an informal SLD coalition partner in the Sejm and, after the 2002 local elections, also in the provincial assemblies. Although Lepper continued his lavish criticism on SLD politicians, he distinguished the liberal wing associated with Kwasniewski from the democratic socialist group headed by Miller and Oleksy. This allowed Samoobrona to attract a sizable group of left-wing activists, both at the central and local level. After 2001, Lepper went as far as announcing that Samoobrona would become the only party of the socialist left in Poland.

The formation of Social Alliance and successful performance deepened ties between Samoobrona and the Polish People's Party, and led to their cooperation until the mid-2000s. Both parties coordinated their actions against the centre-right government of Jerzy Buzek (1997-2001). While Samoobrona organized roadblocks and massive farmer protests, the Polish People's Party used its Sejm presence to harshly criticize the cabinet and legitimatize the actions of Samoobrona. After Samoobrona entered the Sejm for the first time in 2001, both the left-wing and right-wing blocs found cooperation with Samoobrona attractive. However, the party cast its lot with the left-wing camp. After a coalition cabinet of the social-democratic Left Democratic Alliance and Polish People's Party was formed, Samoobrona entered a confidence and supply agreement with it, displaying its post-communist alignment by supporting the cabinet's proposals to significantly limit the Lustration Act (which excluded former communist public servants from public offices), defund the anti-communist Institute of National Remembrance, and preserve the special privileges for the officers of the Communist Poland. This informal cooperation of Samoobrona with fellow left-wing parties was called "Self-Defence of Democratic Left” (Polish: Samoobrona Lewicy Demokratycznej) by the media.

Social Alliance was considered a failed project for Labour Union, despite the satisfactory performance of the alliance. In December 1998, the Labour Union lost nine prominent politicians who deserted the party, who claimed that the Labour Union wants to compete with the Polish Socialist Party and abandoned its unique identity in favor of a "few parliamentary mandates". After the coalition, the party gradually abandoned its unique identity as an "outsider" laborist and socialist party in favor of approaching the post-communist SLD and moving closer towards it positions, such as pro-Europeanism. This prompted many left-wing nationalist members to leave the party, together with more radical members who protested forming a coalition with Democratic Left Alliance over its approval of privatization and capitalist reforms.

== Ideology ==
The coalition was a combination of left-wing parties, and was staunchly left-wing in its program and outlook. It combined the agrarianism of the PSL, laborism of the UP that was split between social democracy and democratic socialism, radical agrarian socialism of Samoobrona, and democratic, heavily welfare-oriented socialism of KPEiR. The overarching goal of the coalition was to establish a third force that would arise above the seemingly impenetrable dichotomy of post-communist SLD and anti-communist AWS. The main electorate of the coalition were to be Polish farmers and rural population, as well as the "losers" of neoliberal reforms that transitioned Poland to a capitalist economy - Balcerowicz Plan.

Social Alliance protested the neoliberal reforms and austerity measures implemented in Poland after the downfall of communist Polish People's Republic, and heavily campaigned against them. The coalition argued that many Poles were left impoverished and destitute by the reforms, and even the few who gained from capitalist must "recognise that there are very many people living modestly in Poland". Social Alliance stressed the need to bring a more humane system than capitalism and neoliberalism to Poland; the proposed system of the coalition was socialism, with strong agrarian and laborist overtones. It presented itself as above the post-communist and anti-communist blocs however, and instead evoked the socialist legacy of pre-WW2 Polish Socialist Party.

The coalition heavily utilized endorsements of agrarian trade unions, which was made easy with the presence of both PSL and Samoobrona in the coalition. In its campaign, Social Alliance noted the disparity between the claims of continuous growth and development by neoliberal parties and the actual living conditions of most Poles, marked by persisting poverty and inequality. The coalition argued that the economy "must serve the people, and their success is to be measured by improvements in the living conditions of millions of citizens, not by the affluence of a narrow elite provided by liberals." It stated that its goal is to build a "just and equal Poland", where economic reforms will prioritize guaranteeing decent living conditions for all citizens. Members of the coalition also called for a new perspective on work, which is not to be considered "a common commodity, but a good that gives - in addition to a livelihood - dignity and a sense of security". The coalition also stated that the free market has failed to provide well-paid jobs to many citizens, and advocated restoring the socialist practice of jobs being funded and organized directly by the state for those in need.

To accommodate all members of the coalition and carve out a unique identity that would set it apart from the two main forces competing in the election, Social Alliance presented an agricultural, rural ethos personified with the chant "Nation, Tradition, Land" (Polish: Naród, Tradycja, Ziemia) combined with feminist and anti-capitalist phraseology. To appeal to rural and poor voters, the coalition also stood out by the colloquial manners of its campaign, with one of its two main slogans being "Balcerowicz — dud of the year". Ultimately, Social Alliance sought to emphasize the agrarian character of PSL and Samoobrona, while presenting a syncretic social outlook that combined rural traditionalism and Catholicism with some progressive stances.

The statements of the Social Alliance politicians were strongly emotive. With slogans such as "Together we can do it", "Serve no foreigners" and "Balcerowicz — dud of the year", it sought to evoke among their, largely poor, voters a sense of "ours", familiarity and emotional connectivity. The coalition portrayed the neoliberal and capitalist reforms carried out by previous governments as a heartless, pragmatic, pro-Western policy, with no regard for the ordinary people. The advertisements of the coalition were full of sentimentalism and presented idyllic, rural settings; however, it stopped short of showing nostalgia for the communist Polish People's Republic, given the Social Alliance's goal to present itself as the 'independent left' above the post-communist and anti-communist divide.

However, there were clear ideological clashes between the coalition members on other matters. Labour Union was pro-European and protested the hard Euroscepticism of Samoobrona. Samoobrona, a far-left socialist grouping, was strongly critical of Labour Union shortly before forming the coalition, denouncing it as "pure water liberals" pretending to be "defenders of working people". Meanwhile, the Polish People's Party faced rebellion from its nationalist and conservative wings, whose representatives stated: "The Social Alliance is an artificial creation and should not exist. For a century we have had the words God, Honour, Homeland on our banners and we must not change that. An alliance with the Labour Union is an attack on our identity." Another split was on social issues, as the Labour Union was socially liberal and anti-clerical, whereas all other parties in the coalition (PSL, Samoobrona and KPEiR) were strongly supportive of the Catholic Church and Political Catholicism.

== Election results ==
Election year	% of vote	# of overall seats won	+/–
1998	15.1 (#3)	89 / 855	▲89
