= PSR =

PSR may refer to:

== Organizations ==
- Pacific School of Religion, Berkeley, California, US
- Palestinian Center for Policy and Survey Research
- Payment Systems Regulator in the United Kingdom
- Physicians for Social Responsibility, US

=== Political parties ===
- Party of Socialists-Revolutionaries, a major socialist political party in the late Russian Empire
- Polish Reason of State (Polska Racja Stanu), a minor Polish political party active between 2003 and 2005
- Revolutionary Socialist Party (Portugal) (Partido Socialista Revolucionário), a former Trotskyist party
- Romanian Socialist Party (present-day) (Partidul Socialist Român)

== Places ==
- Abruzzo Airport (IATA airport code), near Pescara, Italy
- Pasir Ris MRT station (MRT station abbreviation), Singapore
- Pioneer Scout Reservation, a Boy Scout camp in Ohio, US

== Science and technology ==
- Pulsar, a kind of star
- Permanently shadowed region of a body in the Solar System
- Primary radar
- Perimeter surveillance radar
- Posthumous sperm retrieval, from deceased humans

=== Computing ===
- PHP Standard Recommendation
- Predictive state representation of a system
- Problem Steps Recorder, psr.exe, a Microsoft utility
- Panel self-refresh, in Embedded DisplayPort

== Law enforcement and military ==
- US Precision Sniper Rifle
- PSR-90, a Pakistani precision sniper rifle

== Other uses ==
- Portuguese Sign Language (ISO 639-3 language code)
- Potential support ratio, in demographics
- Precision scheduled railroading
- Price–sales ratio of stocks
- Primitive Survival Rating, on the Discovery Channel TV series Naked and Afraid
- Principle of sufficient reason
- Profit and Sustainability Rules, in association football
