= Polish Agreement =

Polish Agreement Porozumienie Polskie
- Secretary: Piotr Jończyk
- Leader: Joanna Korzeń
- Head Committee Member: Bogdan Trąbiński
- Founder: Jan Łopuszański
- Founded: 23 April 1999
- Split from: Christian National Union
- Headquarters: ul. Łukowska 4 m. 23, 04-113, Warsaw
- Ideology: Catholic nationalism Hard Euroscepticism
- Political position: Right-wing
- Religion: Roman Catholic
- Electoral list affiliation: League of Polish Families

Polish Agreement (Polish: Porozumienie Polskie, PP) was a small Christian-democratic political party in Poland. The group splintered from Solidarity Electoral Action and joined forces with the League of Polish Families.

Established by Jan Łopuszański in 1999, who himself was elected to the Sejm from the Radom constituency, there have also been others also elected: Mariusz Grabowski (Tarnów), Halina Nowina Konopka (Olsztyn), Witold Tomczak (Kalisz), Stanisław Papież, Stanisław Szyszkowski, Piotr Krutul (Białystok) and Mariusz Olszewski (Kielce) who defected to the grouping mid-term.

One of the main postulates of the party was opposition to Polish membership in the European Union; the party declared: "We observe with deep concern the development of the European Union, in which we see elements of the same dangerous utopia – with its supranational decisions and destruction of national sovereignty, statism, centralised economic management, and its fight against traditional Western values rooted in classical culture and the message of the Gospel."

The party was formed by an Eurosceptic faction of the Christian National Union, and was joined by minor parties and political associations such as the Polish Family Association. Immediately after forming, the party entered an agreement with the League of Polish Families. In its program, Polish Agreement described itself: "We are a new political formation which draws on various currents of the past, combining the experiences of political movements distinguished in the struggle for independence – independence, national, Christian-democratic, Christian currents of the peasant and workers' movements, drawing on the achievements of conservative thought."

On 12 May 2001, the party co-organized and participated in the First Polish Conference of Eurosceptics.
