= Witold Tomczak =

Polish politician (1957–2025)

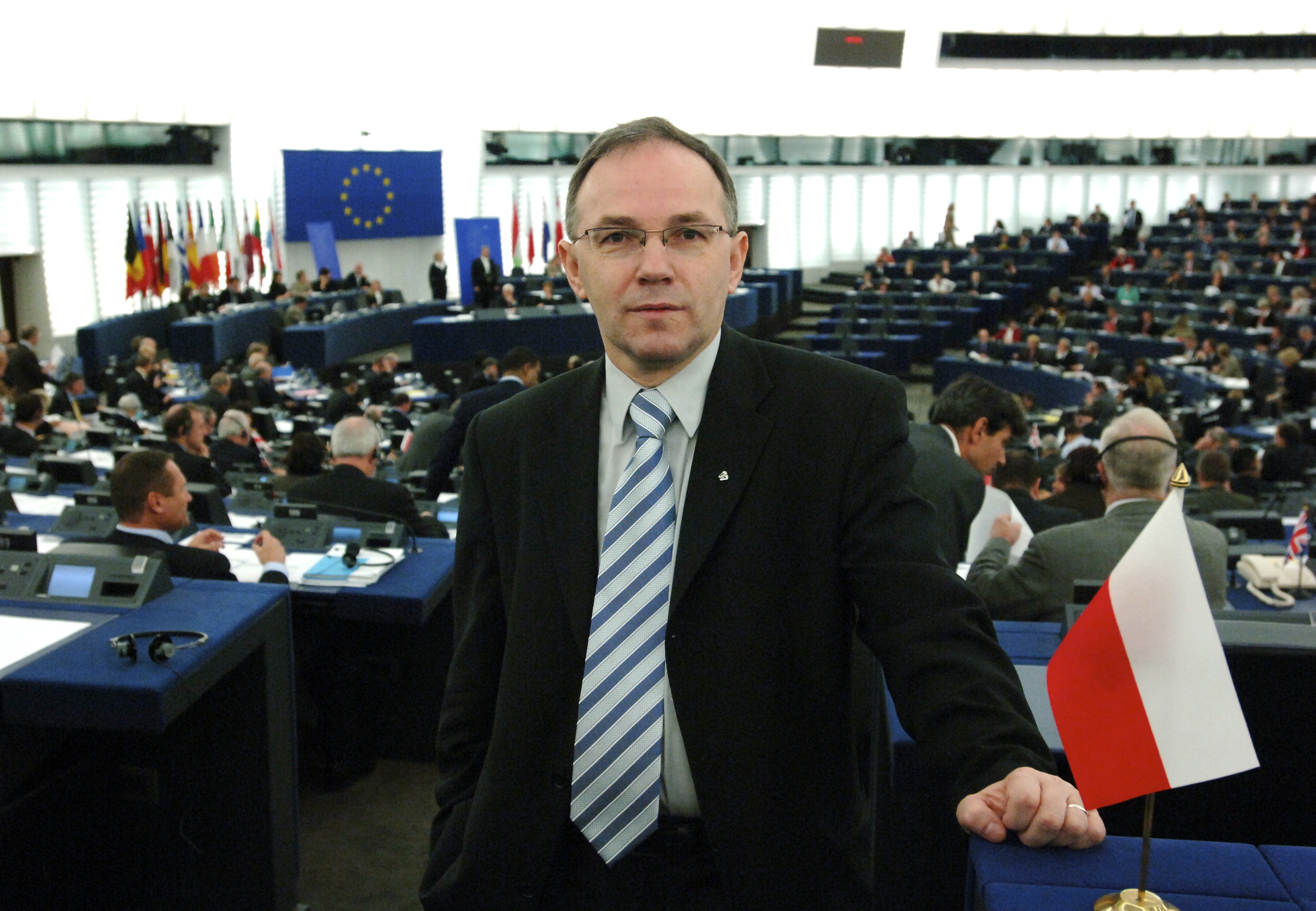
- Born: 5 April 1957; Kępno, Poland
- Died: 11 March 2025 (aged 67)
- Citizenship: Polish
- Education: Medical University of Silesia in Katowice
- Occupations: Polish Politician, Former Physician
- Political party: Polish Agreement

Witold Stanisław Tomczak (5 April 1957 – 11 March 2025) was a Polish far-right politician who was a member of the European Parliament from 2004 to 2009.

Before his political career, Tomczak worked as a physician. He graduated from the Medical University of Silesia in Katowice in 1987 and specialized in general medicine. He practiced as a family physician in Łęka Opatowska near Kalisz, where he was a local councilman from 1990 through 1998.

From 1997 to 2001, he was a Sejm member for the conservative party Christian-National Union (ZChN), which at that time was part of the Solidarity Electoral Action party (AWS). He left the AWS in 1999 to co-found the Polish Agreement party. In 2001, he ran on the ticket of the then newly established League of Polish Families in the Kalisz constituency and won a seat again.

Before Poland's EU accession, Tomczak served as a Polish observer to the European Parliament. In 2004, he was elected to the European Parliament in the Greater Poland Voivodship constituency, and served there from 2004 to 2009. He was a member of the euroskeptical Independence/Democracy Group in the parliament. He set on the Committee on Agriculture and Rural Development and was a substitute for the Committee on Culture and Education and a member of the Delegation to the EU-Croatia Joint Parliamentary Committee.

Tomczak died on 11 March 2025, at the age of 67.

== Controversies ==
=== Art ===
Tomczak made the headlines in Poland in 2000, when, together with fellow Polish Agreement member Halina Nowina-Konopka, he damaged a sculpture by Italian artist Maurizio Cattelan on display in the National Gallery of Art Zachęta in Warsaw. Entitled La Nona Ora (The Ninth Hour), the sculpture is an effigy of Pope John Paul II in full ceremonial dress being crushed by a meteor. Tomczak stated he damaged the sculpture "because this is what my voters expected me to do". At the scene, Tomczak and Nowina-Konopczyna left an open letter addressed to the prime minister, the minister of justice and the minister of culture, in which he denounced the curator of the exhibition, Anda Rottenberg, as a "civil servant of Jewish origin" who was "ignorant of the Culture and Heritage of the Polish Nation" and "refused to realize her 'controversial' ideas in Israel". The letter was signed by 91 Sejm members. The public prosecutor requested Tomczak's parliamentary immunity be lifted, however, this was rejected by the Sejm's regulatory commission. Tomczak lost his parliamentary immunity in the European Parliament in 2008.

In 2016, he was sentenced for the above incident for one year on probation. In 2017, he received presidential pardon. On 11 March 2025, he died at the age of 67.

=== Homosexuality ===
In 2007, Tomczak caused controversy in the European Parliament with remarks on homosexuality. According to the BBC, he declared homosexuality "was against the law of nature, and called on 'so-called defenders of human rights' to tackle 'discrimination against normal families'". The report quotes Tomczak as saying that "[e]very person has a right to life and deserves respect and help, including one who – lost and scarred – has given into homosexual tendencies. The solution is to help those who suffer and to provide them with the cure that they expect us to deliver."
