= Wojciech Mojzesowicz =

Polish politician (born 1954)

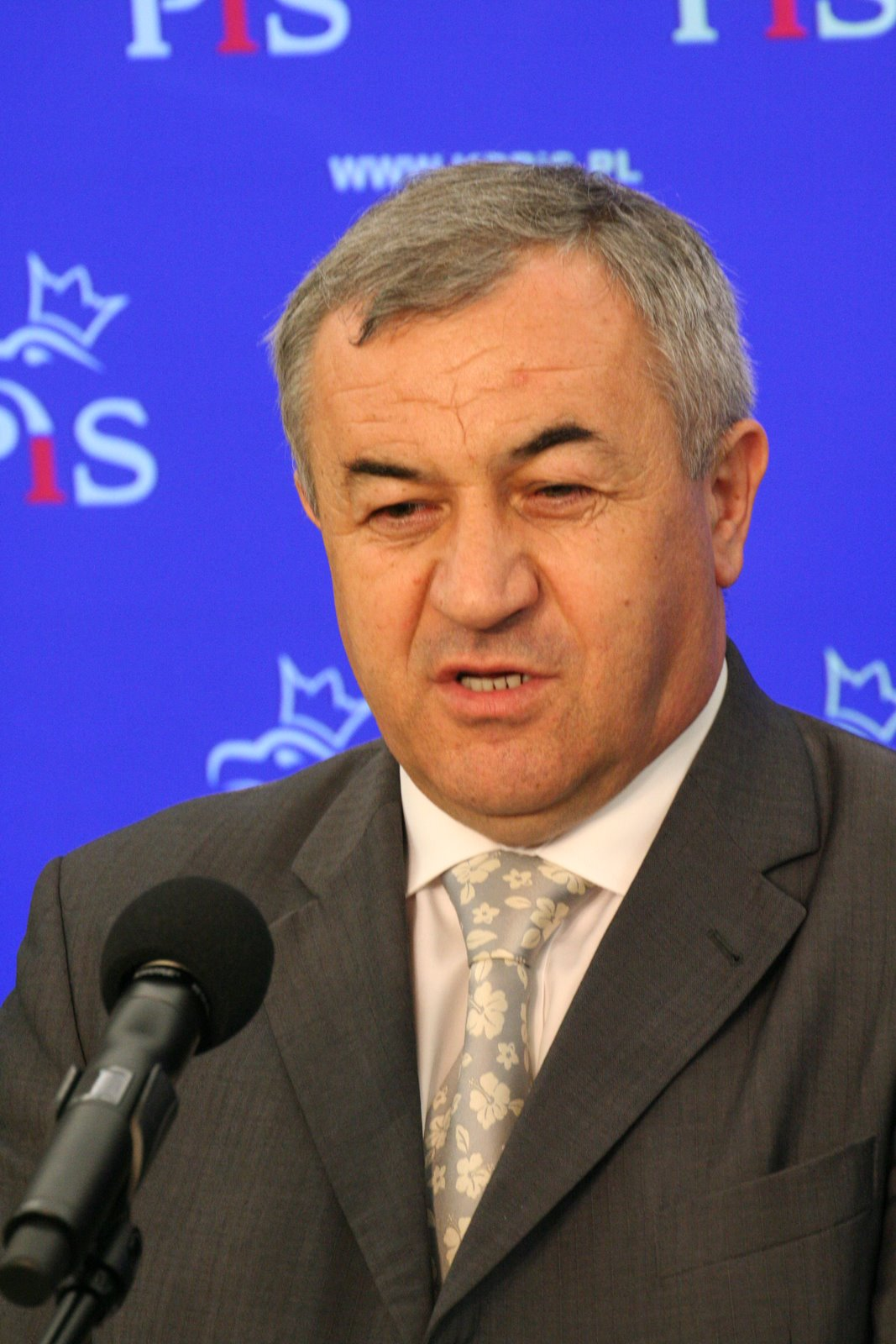
- Wojciech Mojzesowicz

Member of the Sejm
- In office October 19, 2001 – November 7, 2011
- Constituency: 4 – Bydgoszcz
- In office November 25, 1991 – May 31, 1993
- Constituency: 17 – Bydgoszcz
- In office July 4, 1989 – November 24, 1991
- Constituency: 14 – Chojnice

Minister of Agriculture and Rural Development
- In office July 31 – November 16, 2007
- Preceded by: Andrzej Lepper
- Succeeded by: Marek Sawicki

Personal details
- Born: June 25, 1954 (age 71) Bydgoszcz, Poland
- Other political affiliations: Poland Together (2013–2014); Poland Comes First (2010–2013); Law and Justice (2005–2010); Polish Peasant Bloc (2003–2004); Self-Defense (2000–2003); Polish People's Party (199?–2000); United People's Party (1989)

Wojciech Mojzesowicz (pronounced [ˈvɔjt͡ɕɛx mɔjzɛˈsɔvit͡ʂ]; born 25 June 1954) is a Polish politician. He joined Poland Comes First when that party split from Law and Justice in 2010.

He was a Member of Sejm (1989–91, 1991–93, 2001–05, 2005–07, 2007–11). He was re-elected to the Sejm on 25 September 2005, receiving 12601 votes in Bydgoszcz as a candidate for Law and Justice. From 31 July to 16 November 2007, he was Minister of Agriculture and Rural Development, succeeding Andrzej Lepper.

== See also ==
- Members of Polish Sejm 2005-2007
