= Polish Family Association =

Polish Family Association Polish: Stowarzyszenie Rodzina Polska
- Abbreviation: RP
- Leaders: Piotr Jaroszyński; Maksymilian Gorczyński
- Founded: 1998
- Dissolved: 23 April 1999
- Merged into: Polish Agreement
- Ideology: Catholic nationalism; Political Catholicism; Social conservatism; Anti-neoliberalism
- Political position: Right-wing
- Religion: Roman Catholic
- Affiliation: Radio Maryja
- Colors: Blue
- Slogan: Your Choice Polish Family! (Polish: Twój Wybór Rodzina Polska!)

The Polish Family Association (Polish: Stowarzyszenie Rodzina Polska, RP) was a Catholic political association in Poland that ran in the 1998 Polish local elections. It was led by Piotr Jaroszyński and obtained 151 councillor seats in the election, winning 1 mandate in the voivodeship sejmiks, 14 mandates in powiat councils, and 136 mandates in gmina councils. It was heavily associated with traditional Catholic Radio Maryja and its founder Tadeusz Rydzyk. The association has played an important role in municipal elections, bringing in many of its representatives to municipal and town councils; later it led the initiative to create a new right-wing party in Poland, the Polish Agreement.

== History ==
The Polish Family Association was founded in spring 1998 with the local government elections in mind. Its president became Piotr Jaroszyński, a right-wing publicist and commentator on Radio Maryja, leading programmes in the series ‘Myśląc Ojczyzna’. It was also led by Maksymilian Gorczyński, a decorated veterinarian. It was described as a "socio-parochial" association.

The association was largely ignored in the Polish media, and its entrance was announced very late - the state television Telewizja Polska announced it first on 4 October. The Polish Family Association was considered to be a mere extension of Radio Maryja, and its participation in the election was considered a referendum on the popularity of the Radio Maryja's founder, the Redemptorist priest Tadeusz Rydzyk.

In its television spots, the association warned voters to not succumb to the "5% myth", a suggestion that one should not vote for minor parties because of the risk that they might not cross the 5% electoral threshold, therefore wasting their votes. The Polish Family Association attacked established Polish parties for treating the local elections as a "catch-up" for the parliamentary elections, without any consideration for local issues.

In the support received by the Polish Family Association, there was no distinct regional pattern. Instead, the association had a relatively even distribution of votes across the country. It won the most votes in Lower Silesian Voivodeship - 6.8%. Next in line was Wielkopolska Voivodeship with 5.9%. More than 5% of votes were also obtained in the following voivodeships: Kujawsko-Pomorskie (5.7%), Małopolskie (5.7%), Mazowieckie (5.6%), Opolskie (5.3%), Podkarpackie (5.7%), Podlaskie (5.4%), Pomorskie (5.8%), Śląskie (5.9%) and Warmińsko-Mazurskie (5.3%). The lowest support was recorded in Lubuskie and Świętokrzyskie (1% each).

Despite the fact that the association crossed the five-percent electoral threshold in as many as 11 voivodeships, it only managed to win one seat, which makes the proportion of votes cast for it nationally five times higher than the proportion of seats won in local assemblies.

After the 1998 elections, together with Radiom Maryja the association spearheaded the idea of a united, Catholic nationalist and right-wing party to challenge the monopoly Solidarity Electoral Action in parliamentary elections as well. These efforts resulted in the creation of Polish Agreement in 1999, into which the Polish Family Association merged.

== Ideology ==
The leader of the association, Piotr Jaroszyński, defined the aims of the RP as follows: ‘The association wants to help Poles self-organise to defend human rights as a person, the rights of the family as the natural environment for the conception, birth and upbringing of a human being, the rights of the Nation to its own culture and independent state, the rights of believers to participate publicly in the life of the living Catholic Church. Just as these rights used to be destroyed by communism, today they are destroyed in a more sophisticated way by Euro-socialism’.

The association's program was oriented around the need to defend ‘Polish values’, which the Polish Family Association listed as the defence of the unborn, an expansive concordat, faithfulness to the Catholic Church, and opposition to privatization and sale of Polish land to foreign companies - the association argued that Polish land and industry must remain in Polish hands. It was heavily critical of the capitalist economic reforms of the Polish government.

The Polish Family Association heavily attacked the Solidarity Electoral Action, arguing that it cannot be called an authentic right-wing party ("merely the right finger of the left hand"), stating that the reforms carried out by its government are detrimental to the Polish national and Catholicism. The RP claimed that the administrative and local government reforms of the Solidarity Electoral Association "enable the partition of Poland", while its educational reforms "threaten the degradation of the young generation".

The association's stated priorities was creation of a right-wing alternative to the Solidarity Electoral Action, influencing policies of the Polish right-wing parties, reverting and redoing the government's administrative, economic and educational reforms, engaging Polish families in some tasks of local governments, expanding the role of the Catholic Church in social life, and maintaining the Auschwitz Cross (in light of the controversy that it sparked in 1998).

== Election results ==
Election year	% of vote	# of overall seats won	+/–
1998	5.13 (#7)	1 / 855	▲1
