= Peasants' Party (Poland) =

Peasants' Party Partia Chłopska
- Abbreviation: PCh
- Leader: Krzysztof Filipek
- Secretary: Mariusz Świecki
- Founder: Krzysztof Filipek
- Founded: 15 March 2017
- Registered: 3 April 2018
- Split from: SRP
- Headquarters: ul. Szlachecka 48; 03-259 Warsaw
- Membership (2023): 250
- Ideology: Agrarian socialism Left-wing nationalism Left-wing populism Peasant movement Catholic left
- Political position: Left-wing
- Religion: Roman Catholic
- National affiliation: Democratic Left Alliance; Left Together; Polish People's Party; Poland 2050
- Colours: Green; Yellow
- Slogan: "Just like under Lepper" (Polish: "Będzie jak za Leppera")
- Sejm: 0 / 460
- Senate: 0 / 100
- European Parliament: 0 / 51
- Regional assemblies: 0 / 552
- City presidents: 0 / 117

Website
- partiachlopska.pl

Peasants' Party (Polish: Partia Chłopska, PCh) is a Polish political party founded by the former Self-Defence of the Republic of Poland activists in 2018. The party was registered in April 2018 by Krzysztof Filipek, a long-time vice-chairman of Samoobrona, who seceded from Samoobrona for the regionalist Party of Regions in 2007 before founding the Peasants' Party. The party includes former MPs and agrarian activists of Self-Defence such as Danuta Hojarska and Renata Beger. The party announced that it would not run independently in elections, and sought cooperation with trade unions and established parties. In August 2018, the party entered an agreement with the left-wing Democratic Left Alliance to run on the party's electoral list. For the 2023 Polish parliamentary election, it ran together with the Polish People's Party and Poland 2050.

The party is based on the Samoobrona party, whose former members are the founders of the Peasants' Party. The party wants to focus primarily on agricultural problems, and represents the interests of farmers and the countryside at large. The Peasants' Party argues that the countryside had been neglected by Polish politics ever since the electoral demise of Samoobrona in the 2007 Polish parliamentary election, and believes that the countryside remains the most marginalised place in Poland. The party wants to continue the legacy of the Samoobrona's late leader Andrzej Lepper and presents a strongly left-wing stance, portraying itself as "the true left, the one that stands on the side of ordinary people". The party calls itself a "social agrarian" alternative to left-wing rural voters.

== History ==
=== Foundation ===
The party was founded by Krzysztof Filipek in March 2017, and formally registered a year later on 3 April 2018. Filipek is a left-wing politician formerly associated with agrarian socialist Self-Defence of the Republic of Poland (Polish: Samoobrona Rzeczypospolitej Polskiej). As the MP of Samoobrona, Filipek became a prominent agrarian and regionalist activist known for organising rural protests; in 2007, he was prosecuted for dumping imported grain during one of the protests.

In November 2007, Filipek was one of the founders of the regionalist Party of Regions, a split from Samoobrona. The Party of Regions was founded by former Samoobrona members disappointed by the lack of reforms within the party, and wanted the Party of Regions to succeed Samoobrona as a party with the same goal and program that would be free from scandals. The party aspired to be a grassroots, bottom-up, decentralised and regionalised organisation.

The formation of the new party was announced in April 2018 and was founded by former Samoobrona members - Krzysztof Filipek became the party's leader, Danuta Hojarska was chosen as the vice-chairperson, while Mariusz Świecki became the new party's secretary. The party established connections with agrarian trade unions, as well as organisations formed by other former Samoobrona members, such as a family farms association founded by Wacław Klukowski. The Peasants' Party was created in response to the dire situation of Polish countryside and agricultural industry in 2018, as the 2018 drought affected more than 2.2 million hectares and caused losses of around 900 million PLN to Polish farms. Crop failure combined with the African swine fever virus render farming completely unprofitable in Poland, causing radical and anti-government sentiment in the countryside. A fellow left-wing agrarian socialist party inspired by the Samoobrona movement was founded in 2018 as well - the AGROunia.

=== 2018-19 campaign ===
Shortly after its foundation, the party started campaigning against the centre-right Polish People's Party and the right-wing Law and Justice, attacking them for insufficient aid for Polish farmers during the 2018 European heatwave. Leader of the Peasants' Party, Krzysztof Filipek, denounced the state-provided drought aid as "load of bollocks and a marketing ploy", arguing that the legislation was watered down to the point of providing help for only a few farms, while also only helping large farms and big agricultural companies, while failing to support small farms and family famers. The Peasants' Party pledged to provide extensive state aid to Polish farmers.

Peasants' Party aimed to run a populist, 'folkish' and relatable campaign for 2018 elections, releasing a disco polo campaign song inspired by Polish folk music. This idea was realised by Krzysztof Filipek, who wanted to promote his re-entrance into politics as well as his own party this way. The comedic lines of the campaign song, such as: "Hi I'm Krzysiek, Krzysiek Filipek, you're going to get a lot of use out of me because I'm getting back into politics to the rhythm of this humble music for you", were widely commented upon by Polish media. The party wished to mimick the campaign style of Samoobrona, with one media outlet stating that Filipek "has made himself into a Lepper".

The party stated that it will only participate in the 2018 Polish local elections and the 2019 Polish parliamentary election through a coalition, given how the party was registered relatively late into the 2018 race. In August 2018, the party that it formed a coalition with the Democratic Left Alliance and Left Together, and that the members of the Peasants' Party would run on the electoral lists of these two parties. These two parties also invited other former Samoobrona MPs unaffiliated with the Peasants' Party to their electoral lists, such as Mieczysław Aszkiełowicz.

=== 2018-19 elections ===
The leader of the party Krzysztof Filipek was the "number one" on the SLD-Left Together list for the local government in the Ostrołęka-Siedlce district. This decision was later confirmed by the authorities of the SLD's Masovian council. The Democratic Left Alliance praised the inclusion of former Samoobrona members on its list, arguing that Samoobrona MPs are important representatives of the left-wing rural electorate. Samoobrona and PCh members fielded on SLD lists explained their decision by affirming their left-wing views and sympathy towards the Democratic Left Alliance.

Following the 2019 Polish parliamentary election, the party also started cooperating with agrarian cooperatives and trade unions. One of the co-founders of the Peasants' Party, Renate Berger, founded a new farmer trade union "Polish Agricultural Trade Union Liberation" (Polish: Polski Związek Zawodowy Rolnictwa „Wyzwolenie" in November 2019. It was established in September on the initiative of 42 farmers from several Polish provinces, and was entered in the register of labour associating by the Warsaw district court on 25 October. Renata Beger became the head of the union's founding committee.

Krzysztof Filipek ran on the electoral list of the SLD-Left Together in the 2018 Polish local elections in Masovian Voivodeship. He gained 4413 valid votes and failed to win a seat. Following this electoral defeat, the party committed to cooperation with agrarian trade unions instead, and the members of the party such as Renata Beger, Krzysztof Filipek and Bolesław Borysiuk became members of the Farmers' Council for the 2023–2025 term.

=== After 2019 ===
The party initially did not plan to participate in the 2023 Polish parliamentary election, and its members remained in the Farmers' Council. According to political commentators, the party had plans increase its influence in the countryside instead. However, the party did become a part of the joint electoral list of the Polish People’s Party and Poland 2050. Samoobrona, which the Peasants' Party is based on, did not endorse anyone and asked its supporters to vote with their own conscience, but warned against Law and Justice, stating: "Samoobrona RP remembers how Andrzej Lepper, winning 15% of the vote in the presidential elections, handed it over to Lech Kaczyński, who won those elections. We all remember how it ended." This remark referenced the ill-fated 2005-2007 PiS-LPR-Samoobrona government coalition; by the 2007 Polish parliamentary election, PiS had expelled Samoobrona from the coalition and is credited with causing the electoral downfall of Samoobrona, as PiS effectively overshadowed Samoobrona's socialist appeal with its social populist rhetoric.

In 2024, the leader of the party, Krzysztof Filipek, attended a meeting with Polish minister of agriculture Czesław Siekierski in response to the 2024 Polish farmers' protests that started in February 2024. Filipek acted as one of the representatives of protesting farmers. The meeting resulted in a list of demands being presented which consisted of protectionist measures that would protect Polish agriculture from falling prices and the overflow of Ukrainian grain. Proposals included a Polish-Ukrainian agreement that would impose quotas on the amount of Ukrainian commodities entering Poland.

== Ideology ==
The party is based on the Self-Defence of the Republic of Poland, a left-wing agrarian socialist and Christian socialist party that incorporated values such as anti-neoliberalism, Catholic social teaching, left-wing populism and socialism together. The Peasants' Party aspires to revive Self-Defence and replicate its success; as such, the party is considered to be "Samoobrona 2.0". Radio ZET described the party as a continuation of the Samoobrona party, highlighting the left-wing and agrarian orientation of both parties. The leader of the party, Krzysztof Filipek, is being compared to late leader of Samoobrona Andrzej Lepper and wishes to continue his legacy.

The party focuses mainly on the issues regarding agriculture and the countryside, listing import and price controls, as well as agrarian-oriented protectionism as some of its main goals. The PCh is particularly critical of the right-wing Law and Justice party as well as the centre-right agrarian Polish People's Party, arguing that these parties "only remember about the countryside and agriculture shortly before the elections". Closely cooperating with agrarian trade unions and formerly Samoobrona-associated organisations, the party aspires to appeal to the left-wing rural electorate.

Peasants' Party aspires to be "the real left", combining left-wing politics with agrarian issues and stanting "on the side of ordinary people". The leader of the party considers Andrzej Lepper and his Samoobrona party to be the role model of left-wing politics, stating: "True leftism requires courage and self-sacrifice and with these actions Andrzej Lepper has proved for 15 years that he is on the side of ordinary people". The party describes itself as agrarian socialist and openly sympathises with other left-wing parties such as the Democratic Left Alliance and Left Together, forming a coalition with them for the 2018 Polish local elections.

The party's leader, Krzysztof Filipek, argues that the PO-PSL (2007-2015) greatly neglected the needs of the workers and farmers; at the same time, he believes that the PiS government (2015-2023) was marked by social improvements that nevertheless failed to address the rural and agrarian issues. He stated that "Polish agriculture only had it well twice - during the reign of Edward Gierek and also when Andrzej Lepper was Minister of Agriculture." Filipek spoke of PiS as a party that "calls itself a right-wing party but pursues a left-wing agenda", but argued that Poland needs a government that will go further in pursuing socioeconomically left-wing policies. At the same tme, he stated his disagreement with the cultural policies of SLD, stating that he opposes legal abortion, pride parades, and described himself and his party as "of Catholic faith and not ashamed of it". Filipek also declared himself as eurosceptical, and the party itself has been described as soft Eurosceptic.

== See also ==
- Self-Defence of the Republic of Poland
- Self-Defence Rebirth
- Self-Defence of the Polish Nation
- Patriotic Self-Defence
- Self-Defence Social Movement
- Andrzej Lepper
- Party of Regions (Poland)
