= Tomasz Mamiński =

Polish politician

Tomasz Mamiński (born 9 July 1943 in Puławy, General Government) is a Polish politician, a leader of the National Party of Retirees and Pensioners (KPEiR) and former Sejm Member. He is a former deputy head of the Federated Parliamentary Club.
