= Federated Parliamentary Club (Poland) =

The Federated Parliamentary Club (Federacyjny Klub Parlamentarny, FKP) was a parliamentary faction in Polish Sejm consisting of the People's Democratic Party and National Party of Retirees and Pensioners and former members of Polish People's Party, Democratic Left Alliance and Samoobrona.

After the FKP was dissolved in 2005, most of its deputies founded a minor party Stronnictwo Gospodarcze (Party for the Economy, SG).

== Leaders ==
- Roman Jagieliński, leader (formerly Partia Ludowo-Demokratyczna)

== Members of Polish Parliament (Sejm) ==
MP, constituency

- Ryszard Chodynicki, Toruń, former member of SLD-UP
- Michał Figlus, Sonowiec, former member of Samoobrona
- Franciszek Franczak, Wałbrzych, former member of Samoobrona
- Stanisław Głębocki, Lublin, former member of Samoobrona
- Józef Głowa, Krosno, former member of Samoobrona
- Roman Jagieliński, Piotrków Trybunalski, former member of SLD-UP
- Andrzej Jagiełło, Kielce, former member of SLD-UP
- Zbigniew Musiał, Piotrków Trybunalski, former member of SLD-UP
- Jerzy Pękała, Płock, former member of Samoobrona
- Krzysztof Rutkowski, Łódź, former member of Samoobrona
- Józef Skutecki, Kalisz, former member of Samoobrona
- Zbigniew Witaszek, Warsaw, former member of Samoobrona
- Adam Woś, Krosno, former member of PSL
- Leszek Zieliński, Chrzanów, former member of PSL
- Lech Zielonka, Gdynia, former member of Samoobrona
