= State Party of Retirees and Pensioners =

State Party of Retirees and Pensioners Krajowa Partia Emerytów i Rencistów
- Abbreviation: KPEiR
- Leader: Tomasz Mamiński
- Founded: 5 June 1994; 32 years ago
- Headquarters: ul. Koszykowa 59, lok. 15, 00-660 Warsaw
- Membership (2004): 40,000
- Ideology: Pensioners' interests Democratic socialism Social democracy Catholic socialism
- Political position: Left-wing
- Religion: Catholicism
- National affiliation: Democratic Left Alliance – Labour Union
- Colours: Azure; Yellow
- Slogan: "You too will be a pensioner" (Polish: "I ty będziesz emerytem")
- Sejm: 0 / 460
- Senate: 0 / 100
- European Parliament: 0 / 51
- Regional assemblies: 0 / 552
- City presidents: 0 / 117

Website
- kpeir.org

State Party of Retirees and Pensioners (Polish: Krajowa Partia Emerytów i Rencistów, KPEiR) is a minor left-wing political party in Poland. The main goal of KPEiR is protecting retired seniors, pensioners and trust-busting. The current leader (Prezes, President in English) is former Sejm Member Tomasz Mamiński.

KPEiR was founded in 1994. However, the party lost the parliamentary election in 1997 winning just 284 826 votes (2.18%) and no seat in Sejm and Senate. During municipal elections of 1998 KPEiR, allied with Democratic Left Alliance (SLD), Polish People's Party (PSL) and Labor Union (UP) won some seats. During the 2001 parliamentary election KPEiR run in coalition with SLD, UP and Democratic Party. Coalition won the election in a landslide and SLD/UP formed the government together with PSL. Tomasz Mamiński, the party leader, had won a Sejm seat in Warsaw.

However, Mamiński was expelled from Parliamentary club of SLD after scandal in Sejm restaurant. Then he joined Federacyjny Klub Parlamentarny, which included various Sejm members from various parties. Party did not run in 2005 and 2007 parliamentary election and didn't endorsed any other list. Their future is unclear.

== History ==
In the second half of 1991, parties for pensioners began to emerge independently in Poland. By the end of 1993 there were 7 large entities. On 20 November 1993 the four largest - the Polish Pensioners' and Annuitants' Party in Bydgoszcz, the Polish Pensioners' and Annuitants' Protection Party in Łódź, the Polish Pensioners' and Annuitants' Party "Jedność" in Konin and the Pensioners' and Annuitants' Party in Koszalin - concluded an agreement on their unification. The unification congress took place on 4–5 June 1994 in Przysiek.

In the 1995 Polish presidential election, the party supported Tadeusz Zieliński (ombudsman, Union of Labour candidate).

The leaders of the NAPE in 1997 were (according to the nationwide list of parliamentary candidates): Zenon Rumiński (party leader), Jerzy Marek, Lucjan Patyk, Tomasz Mamiński and Eugeniusz Demski. In its early days, the NAPE was seen as a support organisation for the SLD (the so-called second type of power party), which led to the formation of a rival right-wing "pensioners' party" under the name Krajowe Porozumienie Emerytów i Rencistów Rzeczypospolitej Polskiej. Before the elections, two former right-wing MPs joined the NAPP: Tadeusz Gąsienica-Łuszczek (elected from the KPN list) and Paweł Saar (elected from the BBWR list). In the 1997 Polish parliamentary election KPEiR (electoral committee registered in all 52 electoral districts) received 284,826 votes, or 2.18% support, and did not enter parliament.

The new party chairman was Tomasz Mamiński. In the 1998 Polish local elections, the KPEiR party entered into an electoral agreement with the PSL and the Labour Union, under the name Przymierze Społeczne.

In 2000, the CPSU cooperated with the newly formed Polish Economic Union. In the 2000 Polish presidential election, it supported Aleksander Kwaśniewski, who was running for re-election.

The 2001 Polish parliamentary election brought the first success - party leader Tomasz Mamiński became an MP from the list of the SLD-UP coalition, and in addition the NAPE received a one-off subsidy from the state budget in the amount of PLN 1,889,650.14 and an annual subsidy for statutory activities (2002 - PLN 704,982; 2003 - PLN 1 007 117; 2004 - PLN 1 973 409; 2005 - PLN 1 973 409).

However, already in 2002, MP Tomasz Mamiński was excluded from the SLD club. As a result, KPEiR ran on its own in the 2002 Polish local elections and won 127,299 votes (or 1.14% of overall support), failing to win seats in the sejmiki voivodship. Unexpectedly, in the simultaneous election for Mayor of the Capital City of Warsaw, Tomasz Mamiński supported the PO candidate - Andrzej Olechowski, who dropped out already in the first round of the election.

In the 2004 European Parliament election in Poland, the EPP co-founded an electoral agreement under the name Coalition Electoral Committee of the EPP-PLD, for which 48,667 voters, or 0.8% of the electorate, voted.

In the 2005 Polish parliamentary election, after breaking its short-lived alliance with Self-Defence of the Republic of Poland, the NDP established its own election committee, which was however dissolved. Eventually, the party ran on the lists of the Ogólnopolska Koalicja Obywatelska.

In the 2006 Polish local elections, KPEiR interlocked its electoral lists with PO and PSL in most provinces. Nationally, it won 358,708 votes (or 2.97% of the vote), and did not win any seats in the voivodeship assembly. However, it won 7 councillor seats (2 county councillors and 5 municipal councillors). In the 2006–2010 term, on the basis of an agreement with PO, Krystyna Pajura, an activist from the KPEiR, sat on the Pomorskie Voivodeship board (she was dismissed in January 2010 after the change of marshal; at the end of this term a councillor of the Pomeranian Voivodeship Sejmik elected from the Self-Defence of the Republic of Poland list became affiliated with the party.

In the 2007 Polish parliamentary election, KPEiR established its own electoral committee, but withdrew from the elections and did not give official support to other parties. In the 2009 European Parliament election in Poland, KPEiR candidates ran on the lists of the SLD-UP coalition, but did not win any of the 7 MEP seats that went to the committee.

In the 2010 Polish local elections, the party fielded lists to the Sejmiks in 13 provinces, receiving a total of 1.82% of the vote, which was the fifth highest result nationally. The party did not reach the electoral threshold in any province, with the best result in the provinces of Pomorskie (4.14%), Lubuskie (3.96%) and Łódzkie (3.05%). The NAPE also won fifth seats in municipal councils and 1 in city councils.

On 22 March 2011, the party signed an agreement to run jointly in the 2011 Polish parliamentary election with the Party of Regions and the Democratic Association (the Pawel Piskorski part of the Democratic Party opposing the leadership). In the end, however, a joint run-off did not take place, and the KPEiR reached an agreement with the Democratic Left Alliance. Many KPEiR members, including the party's general secretary Tadeusz Staniewski and former construction minister Andrzej Aumiller, found themselves on the party's lists. One of the vice-presidents of the KPEiR, Sławomir Słomka, in turn became a candidate of the Polska Jest Najważniejsza party. Unofficially, some KPEiR activists were also on the lists of the Polska Partia Pracy - Sierpień 80. No KPEiR member won a seat in the Sejm.

On 19 April 2012, party leader Tomasz Mamiński resigned from his position and his duties were taken over by Tadeusz Staniewski. There were also other changes in the party's top leadership. Among other things, Andrzej Pstrokoński became the general secretary of the KPEiR. On 31 May, Tadeusz Staniewski was replaced as acting chairman by Wojciech Kornowski, and elections for the new authorities were scheduled for 20 September. Tadeusz Staniewski again became party leader, and Wojciech Kornowski, together with a group of activists (including Andrzej Aumiller and former KPEiR deputy chairman Andrzej Kiselka), founded the Pensioners' Party of the Republic of Poland (formally existing until 2017). The KPEiR established close cooperation with the Democratic Left Alliance in November.

In 2014, the KPEiR signed an agreement to work closely with the Alliance of the Democratic Left, but its activists were not on the electoral lists for the European Parliament. On 7 May, Tomasz Mamiński was re-elected as head of the KPEiR. In the 2014 Polish local elections KPEiR was, together with the Democratic Left Alliance and the Union of Labour, a member of the SLD Lewica Razem coalition, for which it fielded candidates for councillors at various levels.

In the 2015 Polish parliamentary election, several KPEiR activists ran for the Sejm from the United Left lists, which did not win seats. In June 2018, the KPEiR was among the organisations reactivating the SLD Lewica Razem coalition, although it had previously (in May) joined the Civic Coalition in Podkarpacie. In September, the party tied up with the KO at the national level, declaring to run from its lists (which did not happen).

In the 2019 European Parliament election in Poland, the party did not run. In 2019 Polish parliamentary election, the party registered its own election committee, but also did not participate. In the 2020 Polish presidential election KPEiR supported Waldemar Witkowski, chairman of the UP.

== Ideology ==
The National Party of Retirees and Pensioners was called democratic socialist, social democratic and left-wing. According to Jakob Juchler, the party often ran together with left-wing parties such as the Democratic Left Alliance and Labour Union, and their program was closely aligned with these two parties. Joshua K. Dubrow argues that the party is even further left than its social-democratic allies and represents a variant of democratic socialism; according to a 2008 survey by Polish Panel Survey, the party was ranked the highest amongst the poorest and most disadvantages Polish voter groups. Polish sociologist Rafał Pankowski described the party as "left-radical".

KPEiR claims to represent not only the interests of pensioners, but every weak and disadvantaged group of Polish society at large. In its program, the party stated its intention to also stand up for people with disabilities, "poor people disadvantaged by social injustice", single parents, the unemployed and the homeless. The party not only valued common good over individualism, but also argued that "defending the most vulnerable in society" should be the priority of Polish state and the Polish economic system. KPEiR also made appeals to regionalists and regional minorities, believing that Poland should develop a strongly decentralised system of territorial self-governance that would result in "small homelands", with every region having its own identity and traditions distinct from the unitary Polish ones.

Despite its socialist orientation, the party was friendly towards the Catholic Church and stated its support for the Catholic social teaching, especially that of Pope John Paul II. According to the manifesto of the National Party of Retirees and Pensioners, the party supports the Catholic Church and subscribes to the Catholic teaching "with its principles of faith hope and charity, social justice and solidarity, compassion and assistance to those in need, with the message one alongside the other and not one against the other".
